= Carlos Aparicio =

Bolivian politician (born 1982)

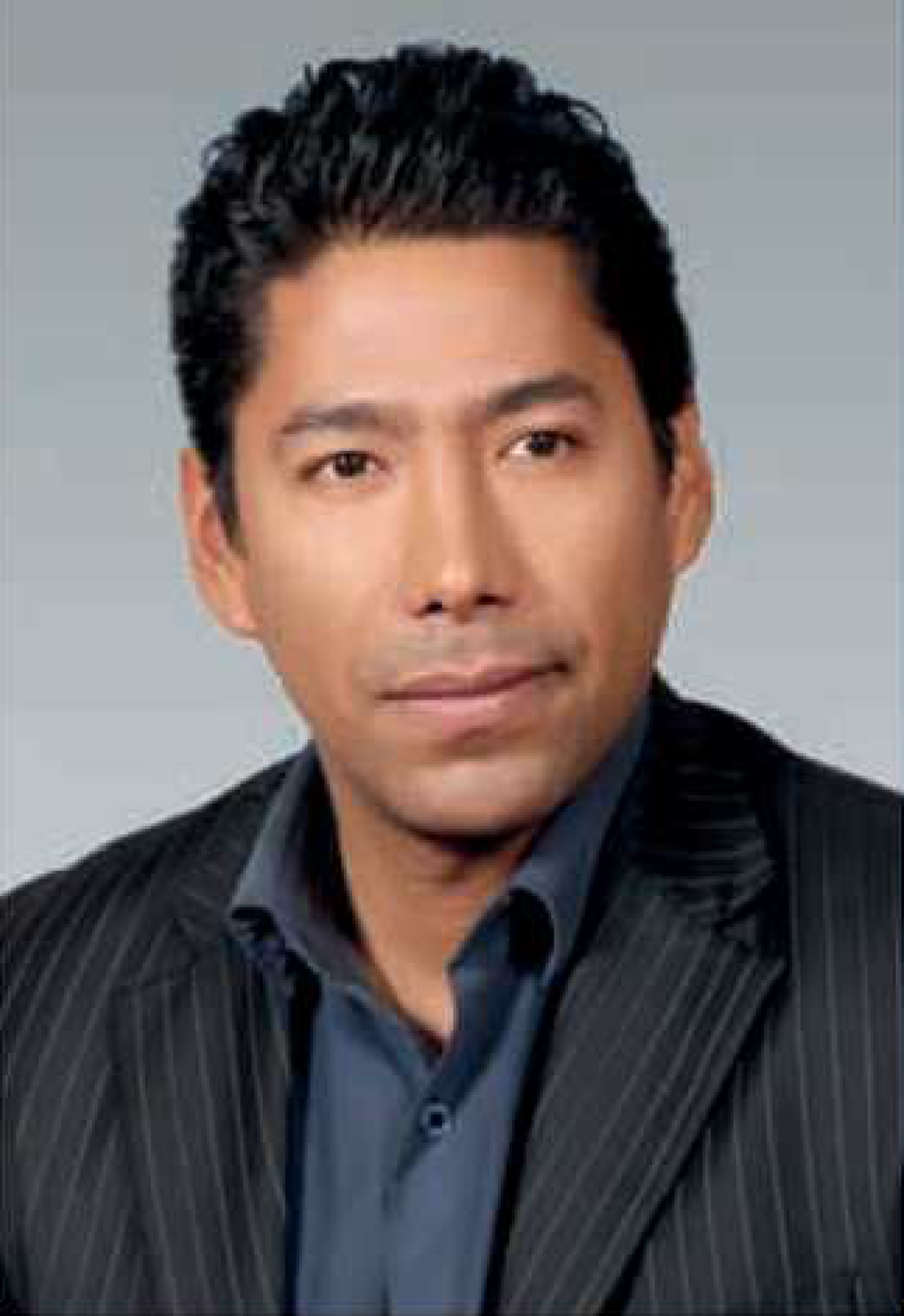
- Official portrait, 2014

Ambassador of Bolivia to Peru
- Incumbent
- Assumed office 4 February 2021
- President: Luis Arce
- Preceded by: Luis Fernando Peredo (Note: As chargé d'affaires.)

Ambassador of Bolivia to Italy
- In office 5 January 2018 – 15 November 2019
- President: Evo Morales
- Preceded by: Antolín Ayaviri
- Succeeded by: Marianne Michelle Guachalla

Vice Minister of Public Security
- In office 9 September 2015 – 1 September 2017
- President: Evo Morales
- Minister: Carlos Romero
- Preceded by: Gonzalo Lazcano
- Succeeded by: Gonzalo Trigoso

Member of the Chamber of Deputies from Chuquisaca circumscription 5
- In office 19 January 2010 – 18 January 2015
- Substitute: Vicenta Zabala
- Preceded by: Bernabé Paredes
- Succeeded by: Bacilio Velásquez (Note: Redistribution; circumscription 4.)
- Constituency: Azurduy; Calvo; Siles

Constituent of the Constituent Assembly from Chuquisaca circumscription 5
- In office 6 August 2006 – 14 December 2007
- Constituency: Azurduy; Calvo; Siles

Personal details
- Born: Carlos Aparicio Vedia; 16 January 1982 (age 44) Viña Pampa, Chuquisaca, Bolivia
- Party: Movement for Socialism
- Education: University of San Francisco Xavier
- Occupation: Diplomat; lawyer; politician

Carlos Aparicio Vedia (born 16 January 1982) is a Bolivian diplomat, lawyer, and politician serving as ambassador of Bolivia to Peru since 2021. Aparicio studied law at the University of San Francisco Xavier, during which time he became an adherent of Trotskyist political theory, leading him to join the emerging Movement for Socialism. He served as president of the party's departmental youth wing and participated in its successful 2005 general election campaign. In 2006, he obtained his first elective position, serving as a member of the Constituent Assembly from Chuquisaca, representing circumscription 5 from 2006 to 2007. Two years later, he was elected to represent the same constituency in the Chamber of Deputies, where he served from 2010 to 2015. Following the conclusion of his term, he served as vice minister of public security from 2015 to 2017 and ambassador to Italy from 2018 to 2019.

== Early life and career ==
Of Quechua descent, Carlos Aparicio was born on 16 January 1982, one of twelve children born to Modesto Aparicio and Elizabeth Vedia, a peasant family native to Viña Pampa in central Chuquisaca's Azurduy Province. Raised in rural poverty, Aparicio began his early schooling at a small institution in Puca Puca, a minor hamlet near Tarabuco, where his father worked as a teacher. He spent most of his childhood in the town, completing primary studies up to the fifth grade, at which point he moved to Tarvita, where he concluded the remainder of his education, graduating from the nearby Antonio Tovar School. Shortly thereafter, he moved to Sucre, studying law at the University of San Francisco Xavier, relying on odd jobs and the aid of his parents to make ends meet, even as he received a small scholarship to cover food expenses.

Aparicio's political ideology was heavily influenced by the injustices his family experienced as tenant farmers in the hacienda economic system. His uncle was a partisan of the Free Bolivia Movement, whose anti-landowner and pro-land reform advocacy piqued Aparicio's interest in left-wing ideals. This orientation solidified during his time in university, where he became an adherent of Trotskyist political theory. He followed that path into the ranks of the nascent Movement for Socialism (MAS-IPSP), a party whose permanent political presence was consolidated following the 2002 general election, capitalizing on discontent with the neoliberal economic system that had produced such high inequality in the country. In 2003, Aparicio was elected president of the MAS's youth wing in Chuquisaca, and in 2005, he served as the party's departmental campaign manager during that year's general elections.

== Political career ==
Aparicio attained his first elective position in 2006 when the MAS ran him to represent Chuquisaca's circumscription 5 in the Constituent Assembly. The 2006 constituent elections provided a unique opportunity for new leaders to make their political debuts due to the fact that most experienced politicians had opted to contest the 2004 municipal and 2005 general elections. This generational change meant that following the election, most elected constituents counted younger profiles, averaging between twenty-five and forty years of age. Aged twenty-four, Aparicio was the youngest male constituent and was among the ten youngest lawmakers in the entire assembly. For many constituents, the assembly offered minimal opportunity to stand out due to prolonged polarization over regional conflicts. For Chuquisaca's delegation, in particular, the inclination of the MAS against moving the seat of government from La Paz back to its historic site of Sucre caused great discontent among the department's populace, with figures like Aparicio being branded as "traitors" by opponents.

Despite the stated issues, roughly one-tenth of the assembly's constituents accrued enough political capital to continue pursuing political careers following the body's closure. Among those was Aparicio, who in 2008 was designated to serve as departmental coordinator for autonomies, charged with aiding in the implementation of Chuquisaca's newly granted political autonomy. The following year, local party bases facilitated his nomination as a candidate for a seat in the Chamber of Deputies. He was once again presented in circumscription 5, winning by a far more comfortable margin this time, a fact that reflected the MAS's rapid rise to dominance in rural areas. Aparicio spent his tenure in the lower chamber serving in mid-level roles, holding office as head of the Chuquisaca caucus in the Legislative Assembly, in addition to serving as first secretary of the Chamber of Deputies' directorate in his final year.

As with most MAS parliamentarians, Aparicio was not nominated for reelection in 2014, a fact that, in contrast to many of his colleagues, did not signify the end of his political career. In September 2015, nine months after leaving office, Aparicio was appointed to serve as vice minister of public security, aided by his experience as head of the Chamber of Deputies' Government, Defense, and Armed Forces Commission. Aparicio carried out the assigned tasks of managing police logistics and budgets for just under two years, all the while maintaining a relatively low public profile. That situation changed in early September 2017, when he was detained by police in Sucre after he accidentally hit a three-year-old girl with his car, leaving her critically injured, an event that, in a bit of tragic irony, occurred on National Pedestrian Day. The following day, Aparicio was replaced as vice minister by Gonzalo Trigoso, although government officials noted that he had already presented his resignation days before the incident, citing personal reasons. Following a three-month process, local courts closed the case after the girl's family dropped all charges, with Aparicio covering their medical expenses until the child's complete recovery.

== Diplomatic career ==
The vehicle collision scandal failed to substantially damage Aparicio's political prospects. By late November, Aparicio had already begun to profile himself as the next ambassador to Italy, a position he ultimately attained, being sworn in at the beginning of the following year. He fulfilled diplomatic functions in Rome for the ensuing two years, up until the fall of the Evo Morales administration in November 2019. Within days of its assumption, the conservative transitional government that succeeded Morales terminated eighty percent of his administration's ambassadorial staff, qualifying them as "political operators" rather than diplomatic professionals. Although the MAS under Luis Arce returned to power in late 2020, internal struggles within the party weakened Morales' national influence. Nonetheless, the former president managed to insert many of his administration's leading cadres in key diplomatic positions, including Aparicio, who was designated as ambassador to Peru in early 2021.

== Electoral history ==
Electoral history of Carlos Aparicio
Year	Office	Party	Votes			Result	Ref.
Year	Office	Party	Total	%	P.	Result	Ref.
2006	Constituent	Movement for Socialism	7,143	49.30%	1st	Won	
2009	Deputy	Movement for Socialism	11,356	59.29%	1st	Won	
Source: Plurinational Electoral Organ | Electoral Atlas

Bolivian Constituent Assembly
Seat established	Constituent of the Constituent Assembly from Chuquisaca circumscription 5; 2006–2007; Served alongside: Arminda Herrera, Edwin Velásquez	Seat dissolved
Chamber of Deputies of Bolivia
Preceded by Bernabé Paredes	Member of the Chamber of Deputies from Chuquisaca circumscription 5; 2010–2015	Succeeded by Bacilio Velásquez
Preceded by Marcelo Elío	First Secretary of the Chamber of Deputies; 2014–2015	Succeeded by Nelly Lenz
Government offices
Preceded by Gonzalo Lazcano	Vice Minister of Public Security; 2015–2017	Succeeded by Gonzalo Trigoso
Diplomatic posts
Preceded by Antolín Ayaviri	Ambassador of Bolivia to Italy; 2018–2019	Succeeded by Marianne Michelle Guachalla as chargé d'affaires
Preceded by Luis Fernando Peredo as chargé d'affaires	Ambassador of Bolivia to Peru; 2021–present	Incumbent
