= Llusk'a Qaqa =

Mountain in Bolivia

- Location within Bolivia

Highest point
- Elevation: 3,760 m (12,340 ft)
- Coordinates: 19°27′03″S 64°40′49″W

Geography
- Location: Bolivia, Chuquisaca Department
- Parent range: Andes

Llusk'a Qaqa (Quechua llusk'a polished; slippery qaqa rock, "polished (or slippery) rock", also spelled Llusca Kaka) is a mountain in the Bolivian Andes which reaches a height of approximately 3,760 m (12,340 ft). It is located in the Chuquisaca Department, Jaime Zudáñez Province, Icla Municipality. Llusk'a Qaqa lies southwest of Wisk'achayuq and southeast of P'isaqayuq. The Sankha Wayq'u flows along its southern slope.
