= Jatun Q'asa =

Jatun Q'asa or Hatun Q'asa (Quechua jatun (in Bolivia) or hatun big, q'asa mountain pass, "big mountain pass", also spelled Jatun Casa, Jatún Casa, Jatun Khasa, Jatunjasa) may refer to:

- Hatun Q'asa, a mountain in the Apurímac Region, Peru
- Hatun Q'asa (Arequipa), a mountain in the Arequipa Region
- Hatun Q'asa (Cusco), a mountain in the Cusco Region, Peru
- Jatun Q'asa (Azurduy), a mountain in the Azurduy Province, Chuquisaca Department, Bolivia
- Jatun Q'asa (Chuquisaca), a mountain in the Oropeza Province, Chuquisaca Department, Bolivia
- Jatun Q'asa (Cochabamba), a mountain in the Cochabamba Department, Bolivia
- Jatun Q'asa (Potosí), a mountain in the Potosí mountain range, Potosí Municipality, Tomás Frías Province, Potosí Department, Bolivia
- Jatun Q'asa (Umallani), a mountain near Umallani in the Potosí Municipality, Tomás Frías Province, Potosí Department, Bolivia
- Jatun Q'asa (Yocalla), a mountain in the Yocalla Municipality, Tomás Frías Province, Potosí Department, Bolivia
- Jatun Q'asa (Zudáñez), a mountain in the Jaime Zudáñez Province, Chuquisaca Department, Bolivia
