= Quchayuq (disambiguation) =

Quchayuq (Quechua qucha lake, -yuq a suffix, "the one with a lake (or lakes), also spelled Ccochayocc, Ccochayoj, Cochayoc, Cochayoj, Khochayoj, Jochayo, Jochayoi) may refer to:

- Quchayuq, a mountain in the Concepción Province, Junín Region, Peru
- Quchayuq (Apurímac), a mountain in the Apurímac Region, Peru
- Quchayuq (Bolivia), a mountain in the Potosí Department, Bolivia
- Quchayuq (Chuquisaca), a mountain in the Jaime Zudáñez Province, Chuquisaca Department, Bolivia
- Quchayuq (Oropeza), a mountain in the Oropeza Province, Chuquisaca Department, Bolivia
- Quchayuq (Yauli), a mountain in the Yauli Province, Junín Region, Peru

== See also ==
- Quchayuq Urqu, a mountain in the Ayacucho Region, Peru
