= Chhichayuq =

Mountain in Bolivia

- Location within Bolivia

Highest point
- Elevation: 3,846 m (12,618 ft)
- Coordinates: 19°36′34″S 64°36′34″W

Geography
- Location: Bolivia, Chuquisaca Department
- Parent range: Andes

Chhichayuq (Quechua chhicha thick-soled shoe, -yuq a suffix, "the one with a thick-soled shoe", also spelled Chichayoj) is a 3,846-metre-high (12,618 ft) mountain in the Bolivian Andes. It is located in the Chuquisaca Department, Azurduy Province, Tarvita Municipality. Chhichayuq lies northwest of Wisk'achani and northeast of Wallqayuq Urqu. The Qucha Mayu ("lake river"), which downstream is named San José originates northwest of the mountain. It is a left tributary of the Pillku Mayu (Quechua for "red river").
