= Wanaku =

Wanaku (Aymara and Quechua for guanaco, also spelled Guanaco, Huanaco, Huanacu) may refer to:

- Wanaku (Chuquisaca), a mountain in the Chuquisaca Department, Bolivia
- Wanaku (Peru), a mountain in the Ancash Region, Peru
- Wanaku (Potosí), a mountain in the Potosí Department, Bolivia
