= Padilla, Bolivia =

Padilla
- Town
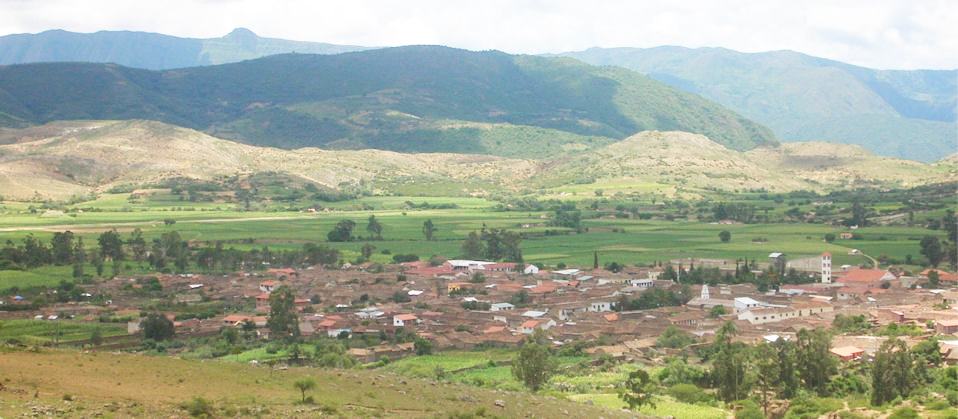

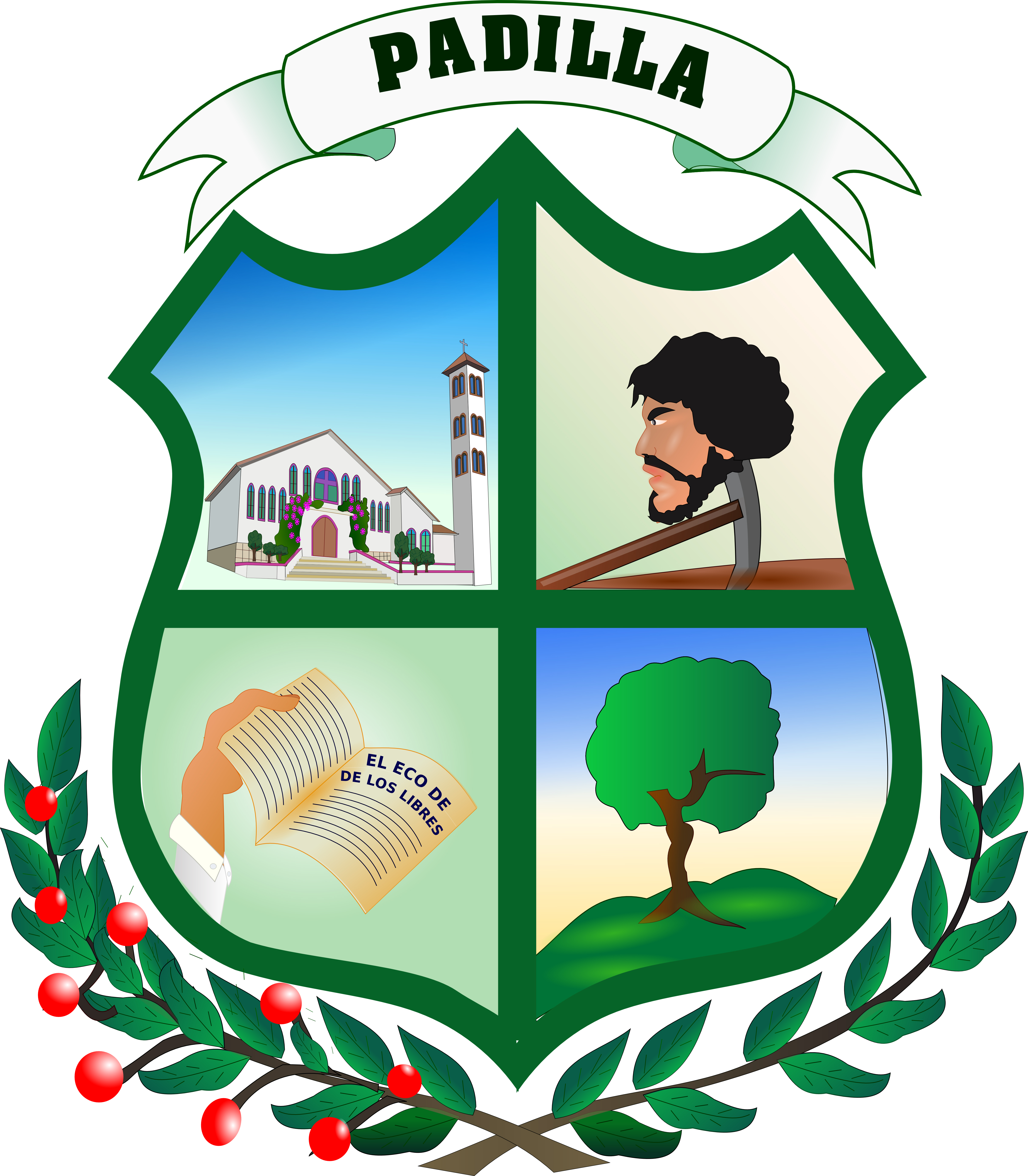
- Coat of arms

- Location within Bolivia
- Coordinates: 19°18′S 64°18′W
- Country: Bolivia
- Department: Chuquisaca
- Province: Tomina
- Municipality: Padilla
- Founded: June 23, 1583
- Elevation: 6,844 ft (2,086 m)

Population (2010)
  - Total: 3,697
- Time zone: UTC-4 (BOT)

Padilla (originally, San Miguel de La Laguna; subsequently, San Juan de Rodas, and La Laguna) is a small town and municipality in the Chuquisaca Department of Bolivia, located southeast by road from Tomina Province. It is the centre of the municipality of the same name. As of 2010, it had an estimated population of 3697, an increase on the 2001 census figure of 2714, and a decrease from ca. 1904 when its population was approximately 6,000.

== History ==
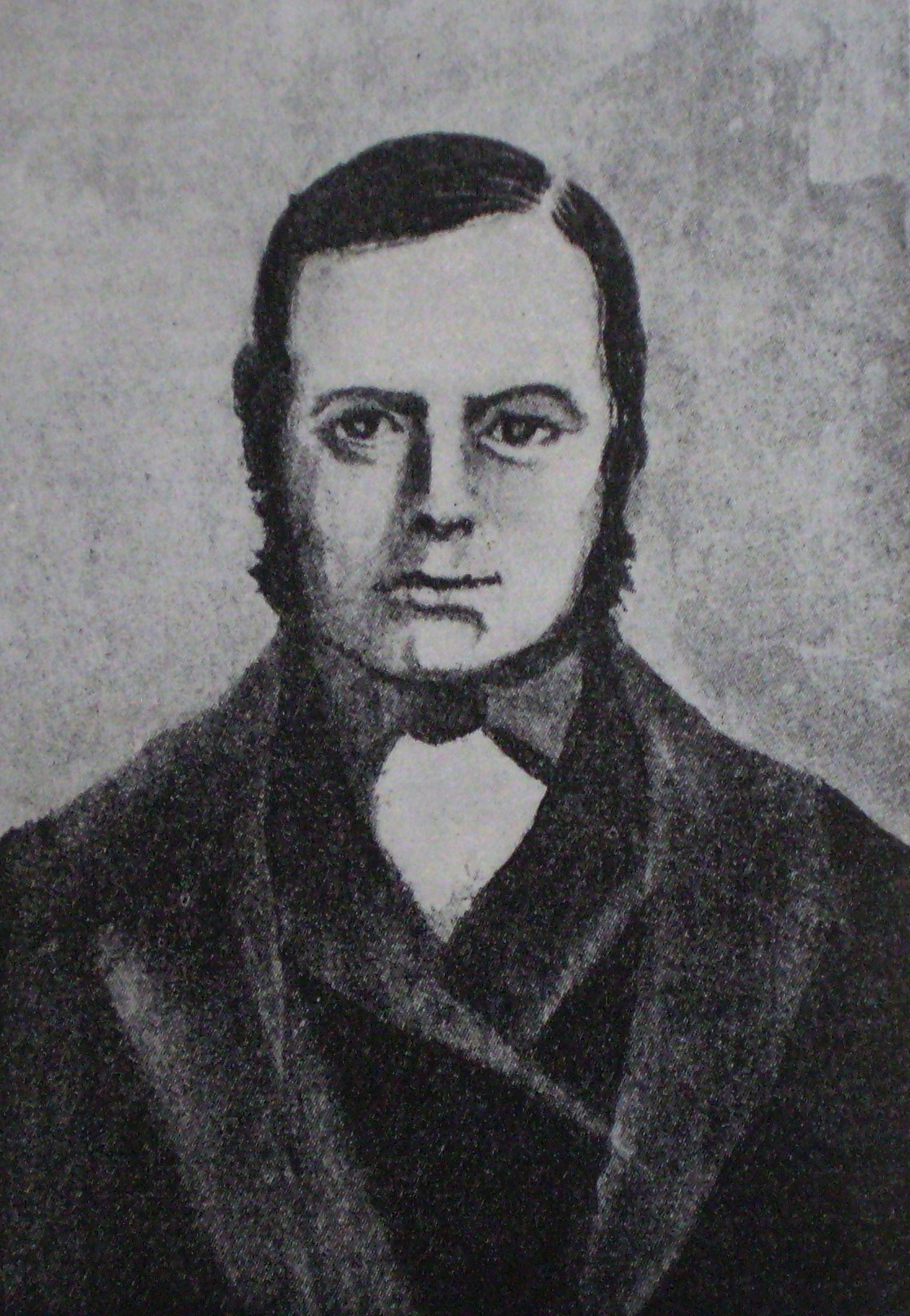
Photo of Manuael Ascencio Padilla after whom the town was renamed.

Padilla was established on June 23, 1583. Along with Tomina, Padilla was originally established as a fort against eastern Indian warriors, the Chiriguanos (Guaraní). Captain Don Miguel Martinez established the town in 1583 under the name of San Miguel de La Laguna. After it was destroyed by the Chiriguanos, the town was re-established by the Spanish Captain Melchor de Rodas who renamed it San Juan de Rodas. However, it soon reverted to La Laguna. It then played a strategic role containing invasions by the indigenous Chiriguanos. The town eventually became the seat of the military, civil authority and ecclesiastical leadership, becoming the capital of the Tomina Province.

In 1809, it became the headquarters of the guerrilla chief Manuel Ascencio Padilla (died 1816, El Villar), husband of Juana Azurduy de Padilla who shared his love of the Bolivian indigenous populations. By 1827, it was renamed Padilla in honor of the province's patriot. During the period of 1882 to 1888, Padilla's judicial archives contained 211 cases of cattle rustling and five armed attacks. By 1905, the crime rate had risen to 296 cases of cattle rustling and 28 armed attacks. Between 1910 and 1930, a steep rise in the crime rate occurred. The most common profession listed for those brought to trial was "laborer".

== Geography and climate ==
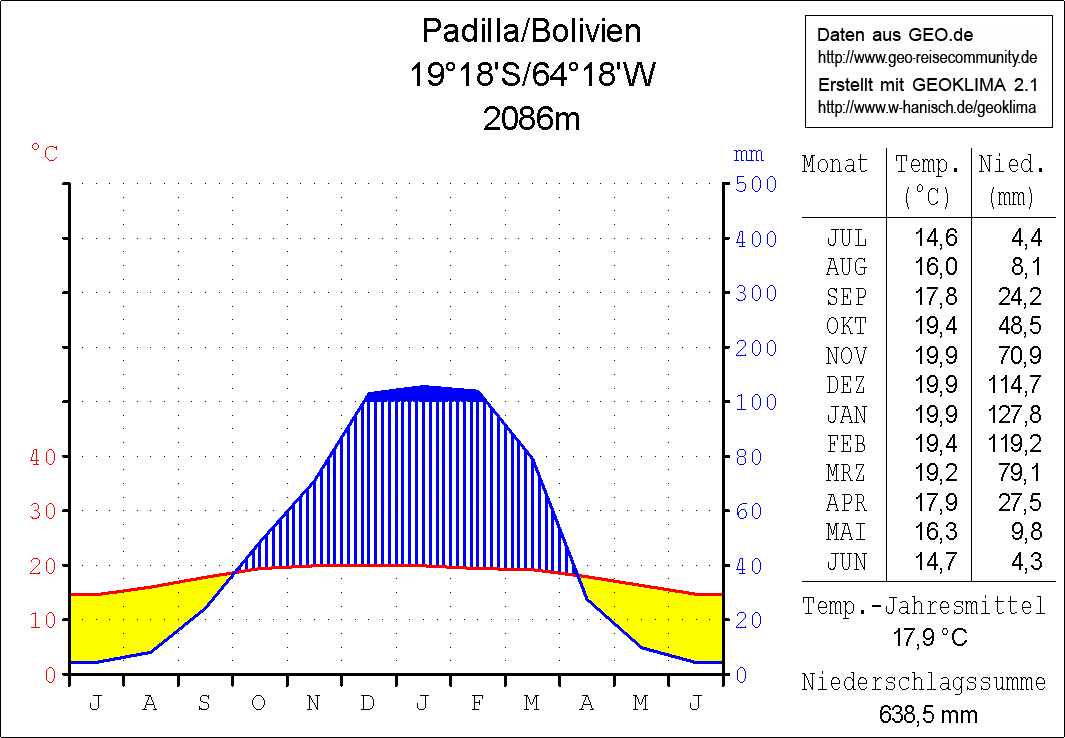

The town is located along Highway 6, southeast by road from Tomina, the provincial capital and 187 kilometres from Sucre. To the east of the town lies the Rio Grande Mascicuri Forest Reserve. The municipality of Padilla has an area of 1617 square kilometres with a population of 12,562 people. The municipality contains 9 subdistricts and 59 settlements.

Padilla is located in the transition zone between the Andean mountain range, the Cordillera Central and the Bolivian lowlands at an altitude of 2086 metres. The mean average temperature of the region is around 18 °C and varies only slightly between 14.5 °C in June and July and nearly 20 °C from November to January. The annual rainfall is about 650 mm, with a pronounced dry season from May to August.

Climate data for Padilla, elevation 2,080 m (6,820 ft), (2003–2012)
| Month | Jan | Feb | Mar | Apr | May | Jun | Jul | Aug | Sep | Oct | Nov | Dec | Year |
|---|---|---|---|---|---|---|---|---|---|---|---|---|---|
| Mean daily maximum °C (°F) | 24.8 (76.6) | 24.5 (76.1) | 24.5 (76.1) | 23.5 (74.3) | 22.3 (72.1) | 23.7 (74.7) | 23.2 (73.8) | 24.0 (75.2) | 24.4 (75.9) | 25.4 (77.7) | 25.8 (78.4) | 25.2 (77.4) | 24.3 (75.7) |
| Daily mean °C (°F) | 18.9 (66.0) | 18.6 (65.5) | 18.4 (65.1) | 17.0 (62.6) | 14.2 (57.6) | 14.2 (57.6) | 13.6 (56.5) | 14.5 (58.1) | 15.8 (60.4) | 18.2 (64.8) | 18.9 (66.0) | 19.4 (66.9) | 16.8 (62.3) |
| Mean daily minimum °C (°F) | 12.9 (55.2) | 12.8 (55.0) | 12.3 (54.1) | 10.5 (50.9) | 6.0 (42.8) | 4.8 (40.6) | 4.1 (39.4) | 5.1 (41.2) | 7.3 (45.1) | 11.0 (51.8) | 12.0 (53.6) | 13.7 (56.7) | 9.4 (48.9) |
| Average precipitation mm (inches) | 122.1 (4.81) | 101.1 (3.98) | 80.1 (3.15) | 29.0 (1.14) | 9.2 (0.36) | 2.3 (0.09) | 6.3 (0.25) | 2.6 (0.10) | 19.3 (0.76) | 36.4 (1.43) | 53.5 (2.11) | 99.6 (3.92) | 561.5 (22.1) |
| Average precipitation days | 13.0 | 11.9 | 9.6 | 7.9 | 4.8 | 3.1 | 2.1 | 1.8 | 4.2 | 9.2 | 8.0 | 12.4 | 88 |
Source: Servicio Nacional de Meteorología e Hidrología de Bolivia

== Economy ==
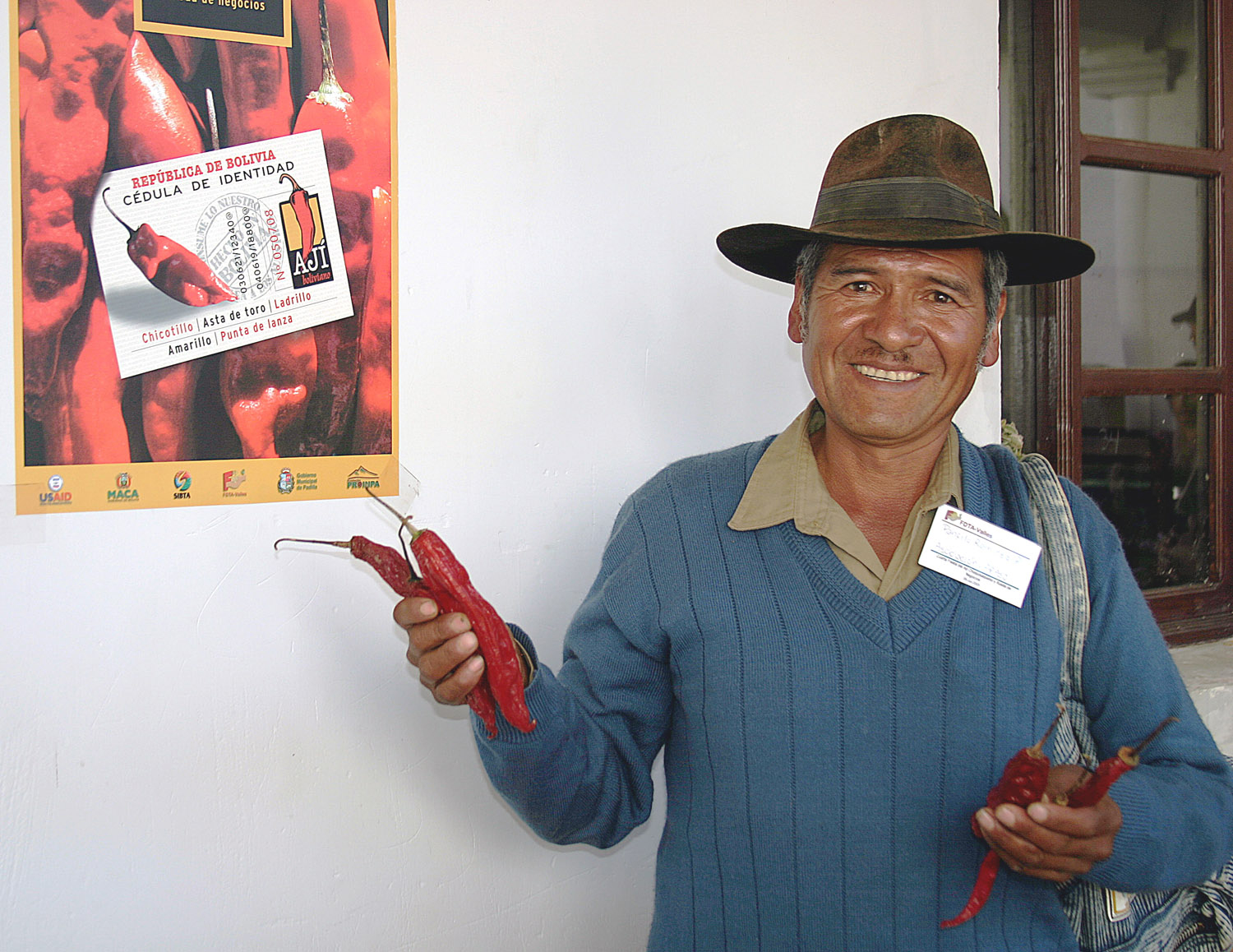
Local man holding a chili pepper in Padilla

Padilla lies in one of the poorest regions of Bolivia, with few natural resources and lacking social and economic conditions. The municipality of Padilla has an economy which is based around traditional agriculture such as the production of corn, potatoes, beans, wheat, yuca, cassava, yams, peppers, and amaranth. It is especially noted for its quality red Chili peppers and annually enters into the International Red Chili Pepper Festival. The people of Padilla rear goats.

== Culture ==
The town of Padilla is populated by a mostly mestizo population, many of which are descendants from Spaniard families who intermingled with Quechuas from nearby settlements to the West. In the eastern-most and southern areas of the municipal jurisdiction of Padilla an important Guarani population is present.

It has local utility services of water, electricity, and sewage, as well as health centers, TV signal, Entel fiber-optic internet service, cell phones, plus a radio station and tourist accommodation services.

In music, Padilla has its own composers and musical instrument performers who perform at a traditional carnival. A composer of note is Prof. Moses Avilés Palma who wrote the lyrics and music of Ode to Padilla and was the composer of Padillita.

== Notable people ==
57th President of Bolivia, Celso Torrelio, was born in Padilla.
