= Jatun Mayu =

Jatun Mayu or Hatun Mayu (Quechua hatun (jatun in Bolivia) big, mayu river, "big river", also spelled Jatun Mayo) may refer to:

- Hatun Mayu, a river in the Puno Region, Peru
- Jatun Mayu (Chuquisaca), a river in the Chuquisaca Department, Bolivia
- Jatun Mayu (Esteban Arce), a river in the Esteban Arce Province, Cochabamba Department, Bolivia
- Jatun Mayu (Linares), a river in the provinces of Antonio Quijarro, José María Linares and Tomás Frías, Potosí Department, Bolivia
- Jatun Mayu (Tomás Frías), a river in the Tomás Frías Province, Potosí Department, Bolivia
- Jatun Mayu (Tiraque), a river in the Tiraque Municipality, Cochabamba Department, Bolivia
