= Wayra Q'asa =

Wayra Q'asa (Quechua wayra wind, q'asa mountain pass, "wind pass", also spelled Huairacasa, Huayra Khasa, Huayraccasa, Huayrajasa) may refer to:

- Wayra Q'asa (Angaraes), a mountain in the Angaraes Province, Huancavelica Region, Peru
- Wayra Q'asa (Bolivia), a mountain in the Chuquisaca Department, Bolivia
- Wayra Q'asa (Huancavelica), a mountain on the border of the Castrovirreyna Province and the Huancavelica Province, Huancavelica Region, Peru
