= Puka Urqu =

Puka Urqu (Quechua puka red, urqu mountain, "red mountain", also spelled Puca Orcco, Puca Orco, Puca Orjo, Puca Orkho, Puca Urco, Pucaorcco, Pucaorco, Pucaorkho, Pucaorjo, Pucaurco, Puka Orqo) may refer to:

- Puka Urqu (Antabamba), a mountain in the Antabamba District, Antabamba Province, Apurímac Region, Peru
- Puka Urqu (Arequipa), a mountain in the Arequipa Region and in the Ayacucho Region, Peru
- Puka Urqu (Ayacucho), a mountain with an archaeological site of that name in the Ayacucho Region, Peru
- Puka Urqu (Bolivia), a mountain in the Tomás Frías Province, Potosí Department, Bolivia
- Puka Urqu (Calca), a mountain in the Calca Province, Cusco Region, Peru
- Puka Urqu (Canas-Canchis), a mountain on the border of the Canas Province and the Canchis Province, Cusco Region, Peru
- Puka Urqu (Canchis), a mountain in the Canchis Province, Cusco Region, Peru
- Puka Urqu (Charcas), a mountain in the Charcas Province, Potosí Department, Bolivia
- Puka Urqu (Chuquisaca), a mountain in the Chuquisaca Department, Bolivia
- Puka Urqu (Oropesa), a mountain in the Oropesa District, Antabamba Province, Apurímac Region, Peru
- Puka Urqu (Puno), a mountain in the Puno Region, Peru
