= Yana Qaqa (disambiguation) =

Yana Qaqa is a mountain in the Vilcanota mountain range in the Andes of Peru.

Yana Qaqa may also refer to:

- Yana Qaqa (Chayanta), a mountain in the Chayanta Province, Potosí Department, Bolivia
- Yana Qaqa (Chuquisaca), a mountain in the Chuquisaca Department, Bolivia
- Yana Qaqa (Cochabamba), a mountain in the Cochabamba Department, Bolivia
- Yana Qaqa (Nor Chichas), a mountain in the Nor Chichas Province, Potosí Department, Bolivia
- Yana Qaqa (Potosí), a mountain in the Tomás Frías Province, Potosí Department, Bolivia
