= Wayra Q'asa (Bolivia) =

Mountain in Bolivia

- Location within Bolivia

Highest point
- Elevation: 3,720 m (12,200 ft)
- Coordinates: 19°37′31″S 64°42′35″W

Geography
- Location: Bolivia, Chuquisaca Department
- Parent range: Andes

Wayra Q'asa (Quechua wayra wind, q'asa mountain pass, "wind pass", also spelled Huayra Khasa) is a mountain in the Bolivian Andes which reaches a height of approximately 3,720 m (12,200 ft). It is located in the Chuquisaca Department, Jaime Zudáñez Province, Icla Municipality. Wayra Q'asa lies southwest of Chullunkhäni. The Lampasar River originates at the mountain. It is a left tributary of the Pillku Mayu ("red river").
