= T'uru Pampa =

Mountain in Bolivia

- Location within Bolivia

Highest point
- Elevation: 3,420 m (11,220 ft)
- Coordinates: 19°46′47″S 64°37′00″W

Geography
- Location: Bolivia, Chuquisaca Department
- Parent range: Andes

T'uru Pampa (Quechua for polished, slippery, also spelled Thuru Pampa) is a mountain in the Bolivian Andes which reaches a height of approximately 3,420 m (11,220 ft). It is located in the Chuquisaca Department, Azurduy Province, Tarvita Municipality. T'uru Pampa lies at the Rumi Jich'asqa River, southwest of Llusk'a.
