= Puka Qaqa (Bolivia) =

Mountain in Bolivia

- Location within Bolivia

Highest point
- Elevation: 3,308 m (10,853 ft)
- Coordinates: 19°20′46″S 64°45′42″W

Geography
- Location: Bolivia, Chuquisaca Department
- Parent range: Andes

Puka Qaqa (Quechua puka red, qaqa rock, "red rock", also spelled Puca Khakha) is a 3,308-metre-high (10,853 ft) mountain in the Bolivian Andes. It is located in the Chuquisaca Department, Jaime Zudáñez Province, Icla Municipality, northeast of the village of Icla. The Jatun Mayu flows along its southern slope.
