= Azurduy Municipality =

- Municipality
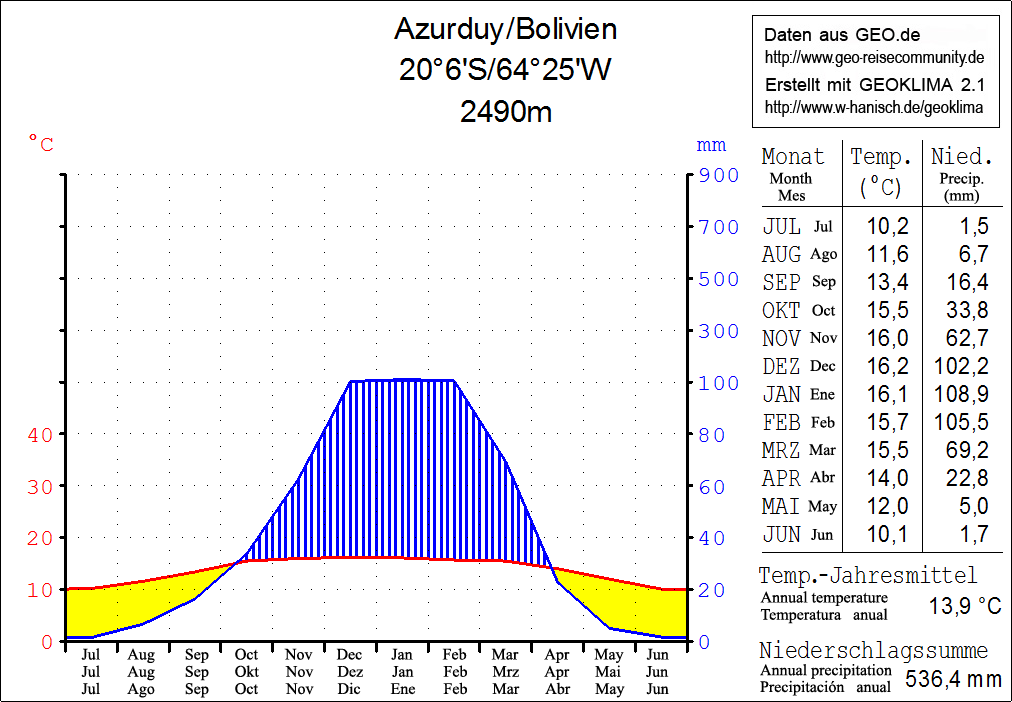
- Climate chart in the Walter and Lieth format, metric, °C und millimeters, made with Geoklima 2.1

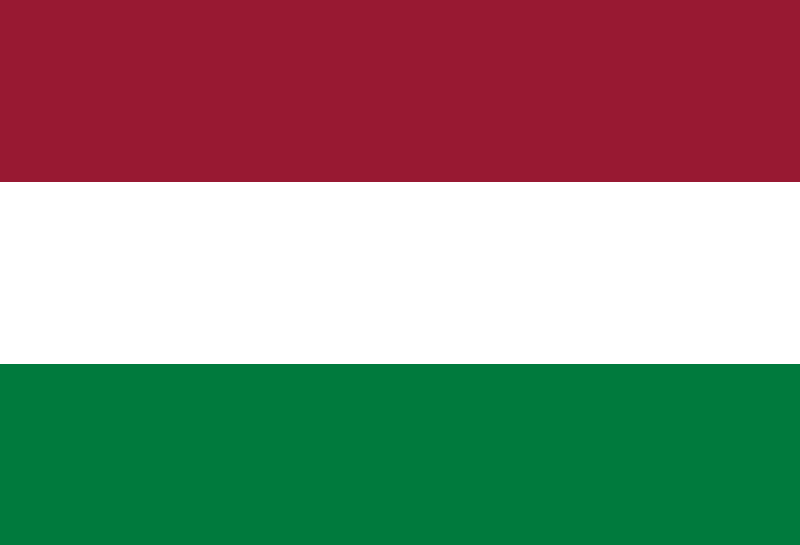
- Flag

- Location within Bolivia
- Coordinates: 20°12′S 64°26′W
- Country: Bolivia
- Department: Chuquisaca Department
- Province: Azurduy Province
- Seat: Villa Azurduy

Government
  - Mayor: Richard Cava Ferrufino
  - President: Florindo Zelaya Villalba
- Elevation: 8,200 ft (2,500 m)

Population (2012)
  - Total: 10,594
- Time zone: UTC-4 (BOT)

Azurduy Municipality (Municipio de Azurduy, Villa Azurduy Municipality) is the first municipal section of Azurduy Province in the Chuquisaca Department of Bolivia. Its seat is Villa Azurduy. In 2012 the population was 10,594 persons. The municipality is very poor; in 2010 93% were below the poverty line, and 75% were in extreme poverty. In 2001 there were seven automobiles (including trucks) in the municipality.

== Geography ==
The municipality is in the mountains of the Cordillera Oriental of the Andes, and is bordered on the west by the Pilcomayo River. The mountain ranges and the rivers are generally oriented north-south. Due to its elevation, the municipality experiences a wide range of temperatures between day and night. The average annual temperature is 14 °C (57 °F), the average monthly values varying between 10 °C (50 °F) in June and July to 16 °C (61 °F) in December and January. Annual precipitation barely reaches 550 mm (21.7 in), with less than 10 mm (0.4 in) monthly in the dry season of May to August, and with the highest rainfall, 100 to 110 mm (3.9 to 4.3 in) per month, between December and February.

To the north Azurduy Municipality is bordered by Tarvita Municipality, also of Azurduy Province, and El Villar Municipality of Tomina Province; to the east by Hernando Siles Province, and to the west and south by Nor Cinti Province. There are 132 settlements in the municipality with thirty-six villages, of which only eight are accessible by road.

=== Climate ===
Climate data for Azurduy, elevation 2,530 m (8,300 ft), (1988–2012)
Month	Jan	Feb	Mar	Apr	May	Jun	Jul	Aug	Sep	Oct	Nov	Dec	Year
Record high °C (°F)	32.5 (90.5)	31.5 (88.7)	31.5 (88.7)	32.5 (90.5)	33.0 (91.4)	32.5 (90.5)	32.0 (89.6)	33.0 (91.4)	34.5 (94.1)	36.0 (96.8)	33.0 (91.4)	32.0 (89.6)	36.0 (96.8)
Mean daily maximum °C (°F)	22.2 (72.0)	21.9 (71.4)	21.6 (70.9)	22.3 (72.1)	22.4 (72.3)	22.9 (73.2)	22.4 (72.3)	23.4 (74.1)	22.9 (73.2)	23.3 (73.9)	22.9 (73.2)	23.0 (73.4)	22.6 (72.7)
Daily mean °C (°F)	16.2 (61.2)	16.1 (61.0)	15.7 (60.3)	15.3 (59.5)	13.7 (56.7)	12.9 (55.2)	12.3 (54.1)	13.5 (56.3)	14.1 (57.4)	15.8 (60.4)	16.0 (60.8)	16.6 (61.9)	14.9 (58.7)
Mean daily minimum °C (°F)	10.3 (50.5)	10.3 (50.5)	9.7 (49.5)	8.4 (47.1)	5.0 (41.0)	2.9 (37.2)	2.2 (36.0)	3.7 (38.7)	5.2 (41.4)	8.4 (47.1)	9.2 (48.6)	10.3 (50.5)	7.1 (44.8)
Record low °C (°F)	−0.5 (31.1)	3.0 (37.4)	−3.5 (25.7)	−2.5 (27.5)	−8.0 (17.6)	−9.0 (15.8)	−12.0 (10.4)	−6.5 (20.3)	−9.5 (14.9)	−2.0 (28.4)	−1.5 (29.3)	1.2 (34.2)	−12.0 (10.4)
Average precipitation mm (inches)	156.1 (6.15)	130.5 (5.14)	107.0 (4.21)	33.7 (1.33)	9.5 (0.37)	2.2 (0.09)	3.1 (0.12)	6.6 (0.26)	22.2 (0.87)	52.3 (2.06)	68.3 (2.69)	139.1 (5.48)	730.6 (28.77)
Average precipitation days	14.1	14.2	12.3	6.9	3.7	1.7	1.6	2.4	5.0	8.9	11.1	14.0	95.9
Average relative humidity (%)	77.8	79.8	80.9	78.0	71.8	65.6	63.5	63.7	67.5	71.3	74.3	76.1	72.5
Source: Servicio Nacional de Meteorología e Hidrología de Bolivia

== Government ==
The Mayor of Azurduy is Felipe Álbarez Villarroel, who was elected in the March 2026 elections.

Azurduy has a municipal council with 5 seats, as do all municipalities with populations up to 15,000.

Seat	Type	Name	Party / Political Organization
1	Member	José Benito Rivera Martínez	AGN
1	Alternate	Dolores López Cruz	AGN
2	Member	Hugo Cruz Aguirre	MTS
2	Alternate	Mirian Vedia Álvarez	MTS
3	Member	Calixta Flores León	PATRIA-UNIDOS
3	Alternate	Manuel Pérez Velásquez	PATRIA-UNIDOS
4	Member	Cirila Ibáñez Tolavi	AGN
4	Alternate	Vicente Valdez Daza	AGN
5	Member	Margarita Muñoz	MTS
5	Alternate	Roberto Guzmán Condori	MTS
Source: Supreme Electoral Tribunal.

== Economics ==
The people are primarily employed in agriculture and livestock raising, although there is some mining. Major crops include corn, wheat, potatoes, barley and peppers. Sheep, cattle, goats, pigs, horses and poultry are raised.

== The people ==
The people are predominantly indigenous citizens of Quechuan descent.

Ethnic group	%
Quechua	62.4
Aymara	0.1
Guaraní, Chiquitos, Moxos	0.1
Not indigenous or declined to state	37.3
Other indigenous groups	0.1

=== Population ===
The population of the municipality of Azurduy has not increased from 1992 to 2012.

- 1992: 10,818 inhabitants (census)
- 2001: 11,349 inhabitants (census)
- 2012: 10,594 inhabitants (census)

At the 2001 census, the literacy rate was 61.4 percent, the life expectancy of the newborn was 57.0 years, and the infant mortality rate was 9.3 per cent. 60.9 percent of the population spoke Spanish, 55.8 percent spoke Quechua (2001). 90.3 percent of the population had access to electricity, while 89.7 percent lived without sanitation facilities.

== Cantons ==
The municipality is divided into three cantons.

- Las Casas Canton, with administrative seat in Torrecillas
- Azurduy Canton, with administrative seat in Villa Azurduy
- Antonio Lopez Canton, with administrative seat in San Antonio
