= Iñao National Park and Integrated Management Natural Area =

Iñao National Park and IMNA
- IUCN category II (national park)
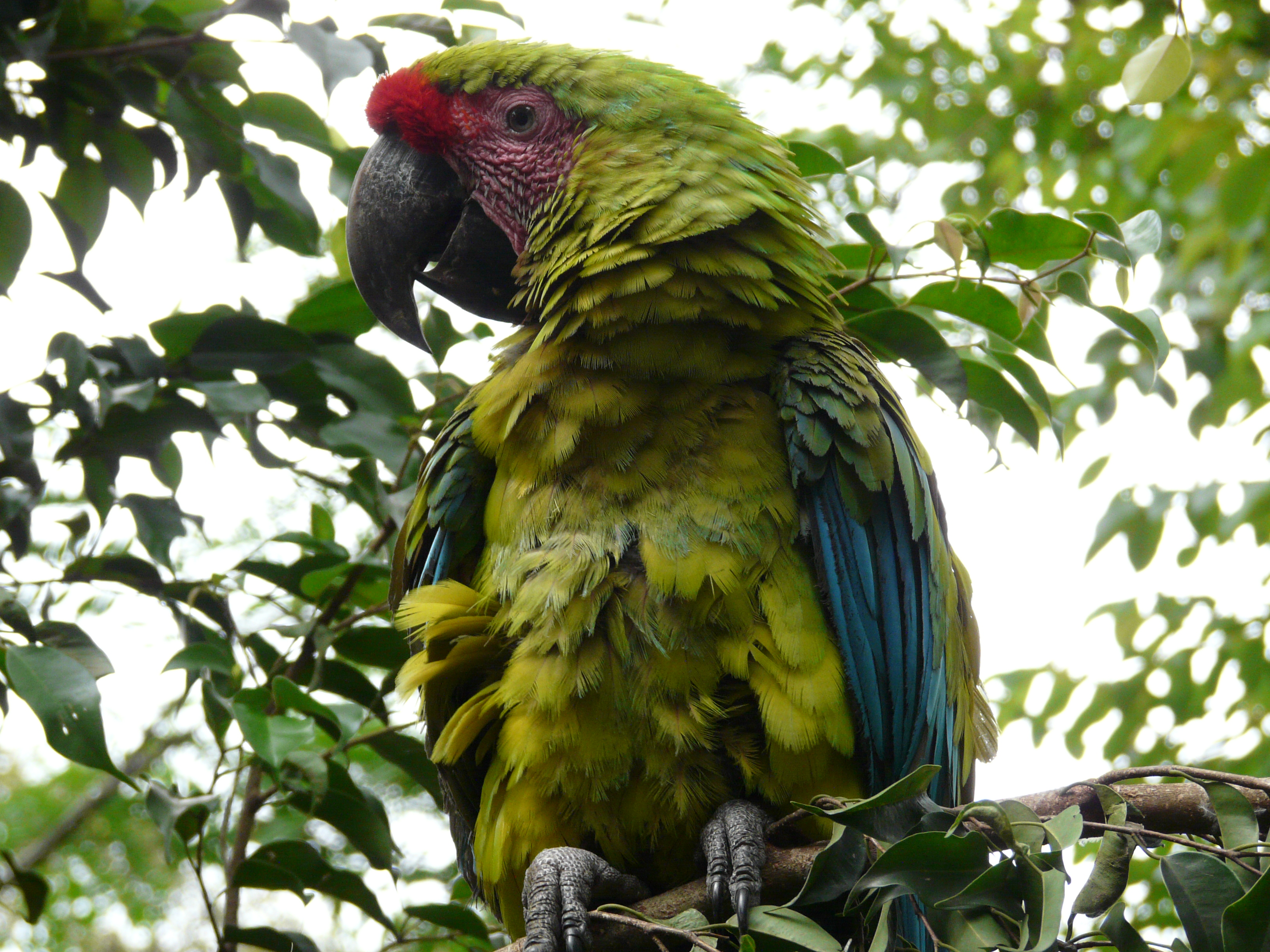
- Military macaw

- Location within Bolivia
- Location: Chuquisaca Department, Bolivia
- Coordinates: 19.425°S 63.92°W
- Area: 2,630.9 km^{2} (1,015.8 sq mi)
- Established: May 28, 2004 (L.R. Nº 2727)
- Governing body: Servicio Nacional de Áreas Protegidas (SERNAP)
- Website: web.archive.org/web/20081109013151/http://www.sernap.gov.bo/areasprotegidas/area22/index.htm

Iñao National Park and Integrated Management Natural Area (complete Spanish title: Parque Nacional y Área Natural de Manejo Integrado Serranía del Iñao) is a protected area in the Chuquisaca Department Bolivia, situated in the provinces of Belisario Boeto, Tomina (Padilla Municipality), Hernando Siles (Monteagudo Municipality) and Luis Calvo (Villa Vaca Guzmán Municipality).

Within the total area of 2,630.9 km^{2} (1,015.8 sq mi), 1,422.4 km^{2} (549.2 sq mi) correspond to the category national park and 1,208.5 km^{2} (466.6 sq mi) to the category "Integrated Management Natural Area".

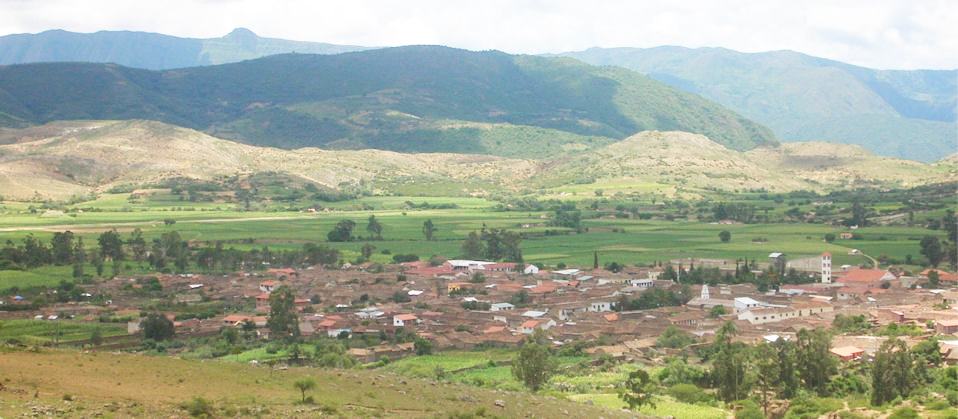
Padilla, Tomina Province
