= Yana Muqu (Chuquisaca) =

Mountain in Bolivia

- Location within Bolivia

Highest point
- Elevation: 3,422 m (11,227 ft)
- Coordinates: 19°46′59″S 64°33′35″W

Geography
- Location: Bolivia, Chuquisaca Department
- Parent range: Andes

Yana Muqu (Quechua yana black, muqu hill, "black hill", also spelled Yana Mokho) is a 3,422-metre-high (11,227 ft) mountain in the Bolivian Andes. It is located in the Chuquisaca Department, Azurduy Province, Tarvita Municipality.
