= Zudáñez =

Coordinates: 19°07′S 64°42′W

- Town
- Interactive map of Zudáñez
- Country: Bolivia
- Department: Chuquisaca
- Province: Jaime Zudáñez
- Time zone: UTC-4 (BOT)

Zudáñez is a town in Bolivia. It is also the name of the surrounding municipality.
