= Tomina Province =

- Province
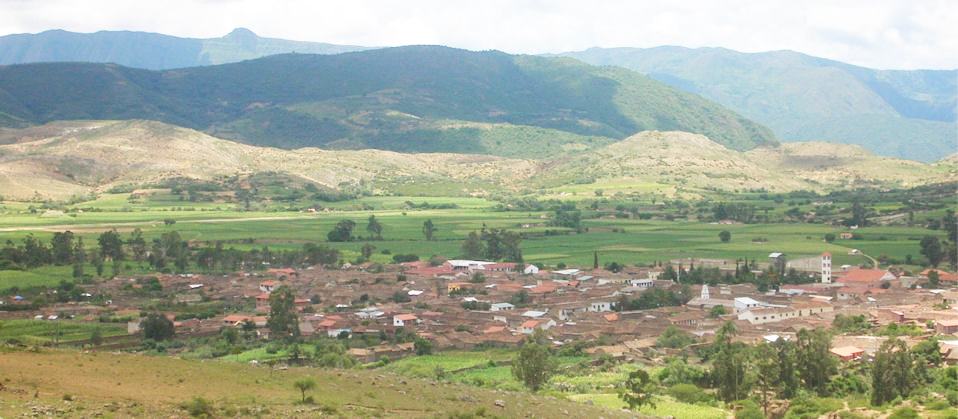
- Padilla, the province capital

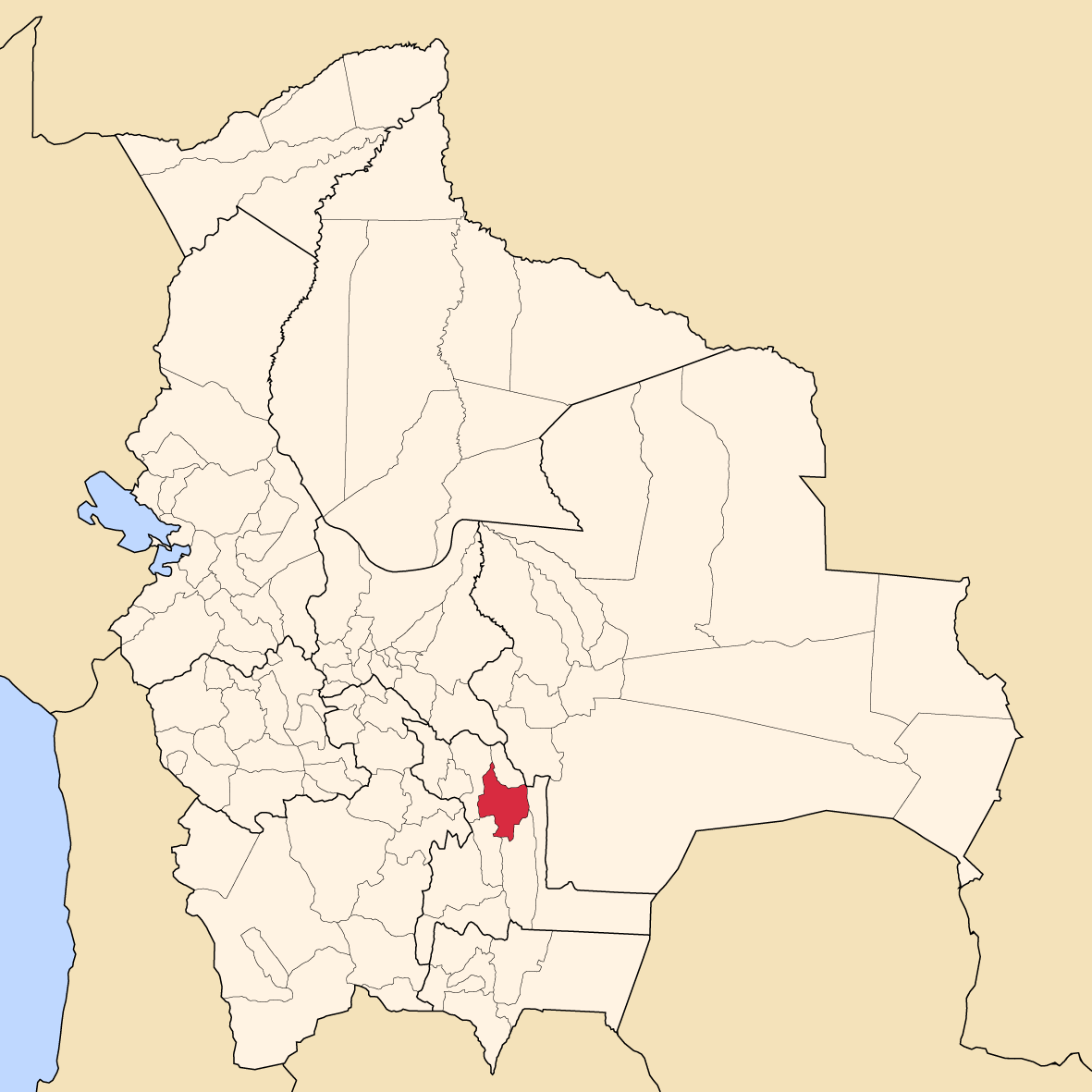
- Location of Tomina Province within Bolivia
- Coordinates: 19°30′0″S 64°15′0″W
- Country: Bolivia
- Department: Chuquisaca Department
- Capital: Padilla

Government
  - Mayor: Constancio Salazar Padilla (2007)

Area
  - Total: 1,524 sq mi (3,947 km^{2})

Population (2001)
  - Total: 37,482
  - Density: 25/sq mi (9.5/km^{2})
  - Ethnicities: Quechua
- Time zone: UTC-4 (BOT)

Tomina is a province in the Chuquisaca Department in Bolivia. Its seat is Padilla.

== Geography ==
Some of the highest mountains of the province are listed below:

- Atuq Waqana
- Ch'utu Muqu
- Jatun Punta
- Kancha Q'asa
- Liwqiyuq Punta
- Mayu Tinku
- Palta Urqu
- Qallu Urqu
- Saqra Kimray
- Sirkani Punta
- Supay Q'asa
- Wayra Urqu
- Wisk'achayuq
- Yana Qaqa Punta
- Yana Yana

== Subdivisions ==
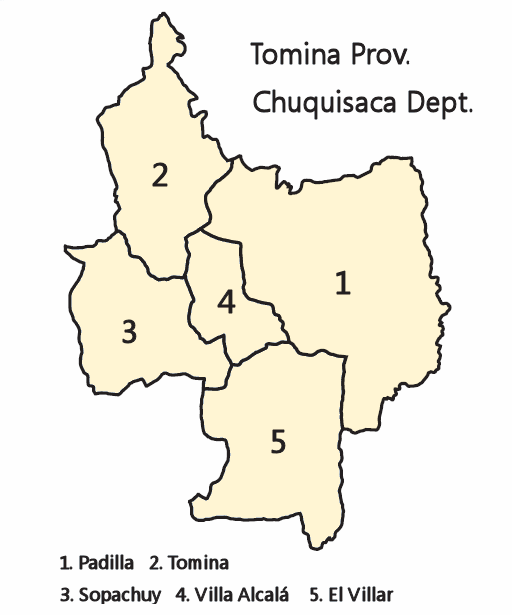

Tomina Province is divided into five municipalities which are partly further subdivided into cantons.

Section	Municipality	Inhabitants (2001)	Seat	Inhabitants (2001)
1st	Padilla Municipality	12,562	Padilla	2,714
2nd	Tomina Municipality	9,060	Tomina	983
3rd	Sopachuy Municipality	7,241	Sopachuy	1,478
4th	Villa Alcalá Municipality	4,034	Villa Alcalá	838
5th	El Villar Municipality	4,585	El Villar	486

== The people ==
The people are predominantly indigenous citizens of Quechuan descent.

Ethnic group	Padilla Municipality (%)	Tomina Municipality (%)	Sopachuy Municipality (%)	Villa Alcalá Municipality (%)	El Villar Municipality (%)
Quechua	55.1	83.8	84.5	29.9	55.2
Aymara	0.5	0.3	0.2	0.0	0.2
Guaraní, Chiquitos, Moxos	0.6	0.0	0.2	0.0	0.7
Not indigenous	43.5	15.8	147	68.5	43.3
Other indigenous groups	0.3	0.2	0.4	1.5	0.5

Ref.: obd.descentralizacion.gov.bo

== Languages ==
The languages spoken in the province are mainly Spanish and Quechua.

Language	Padilla Municipality	Tomina Municipality	Sopachuy Municipality	Villa Alcalá Municipality	El Villar Municipality
Quechua	2,181	7,831	6,261	1,167	1,264
Aymara	29	23	10	7	15
Guaraní	6	4	3	3	1
Another native	2	2	3	1	0
Spanish	11,585	4,418	3,003	3,576	4,190
Foreign	27	12	9	9	4
Only native	250	4,036	3,791	176	146
Native and Spanish	1,951	3,803	2,478	997	1,123
Only Spanish	9,635	616	526	2,579	3,067

== Tourist attractions ==
Padilla Municipality is situated within the Iñao National Park and Integrated Management Natural Area.

== See also ==
- Manuel Ascencio Padilla
