= Supay Q'asa =

Mountain in Bolivia

- Location within Bolivia

Highest point
- Elevation: 2,920 m (9,580 ft)
- Coordinates: 19°30′20″S 64°35′17″W

Geography
- Location: Bolivia, Chuquisaca Department
- Parent range: Andes

Supay Q'asa (Quechua supay devil, demon, q'asa mountain pass, "devil's pass" also spelled Supay Khasa) is a mountain in the Bolivian Andes which reaches a height of approximately 2,920 m (9,580 ft). It is located in the Chuquisaca Department, Tomina Province, Sopachuy Municipality. It lies at the Supay Q'asa River.
