= Inka Wasi (Bolivia) =

Mountain in Bolivia

- Location within Bolivia

Highest point
- Elevation: 3,146 m (10,322 ft)
- Coordinates: 19°44′12″S 64°40′26″W

Geography
- Location: Bolivia, Chuquisaca Department
- Parent range: Andes

Inka Wasi (Quechua inka Inca, wasi house, "Inca house", also spelled Inca Huasi) is a 3,146-metre-high (10,322 ft) mountain in the Bolivian Andes. It is located in the Chuquisaca Department, Azurduy Province, Tarvita Municipality. Inka Wasi lies southwest of Muyu Urqu and north of Pukara. The Laqha Mayu ("dark river") originates north of the mountain. Its waters flow to the Pillku Mayu (Quechua for "red river").
