= Quchayuq (Chuquisaca) =

Mountain in Bolivia

- Location within Bolivia

Highest point
- Elevation: 3,880 m (12,730 ft)
- Coordinates: 19°21′31″S 64°41′22″W

Geography
- Location: Bolivia, Chuquisaca Department
- Parent range: Andes

Quchayuq (Quechua qucha lake, -yuq a suffix, "the one with a lake (or lakes)", also spelled Cochayoj) is a mountain in the Bolivian Andes which reaches a height of approximately 3,880 m (12,730 ft). It is located in the Chuquisaca Department, Jaime Zudáñez Province, Icla Municipality, northeast of the village of Icla. The Jatun Mayu flows along its southern slope.
