= El Palmar Integrated Management Natural Area =

Coordinates: 18.6084°S 64.8937°W

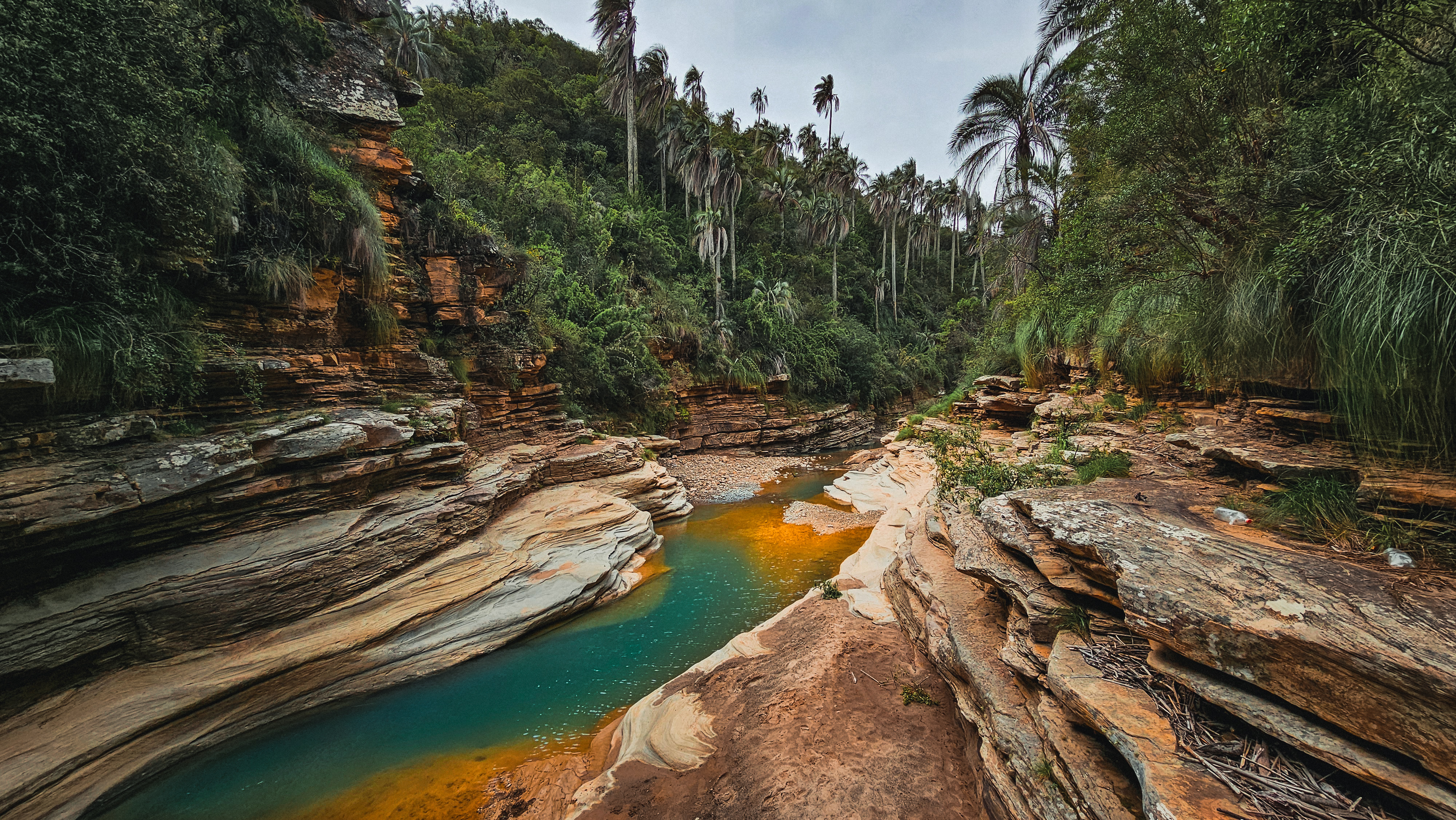
- Janchicoco palm trees along the canyons in the reserve
- Interactive map of El Palmar Integrated Management Natural Area
- Location: Bolivia; Chuquisaca Department
- Nearest city: Presto
- Area: 59,484 ha (146,990 acres)
- Established: 1997
- Governing body: Servicio Nacional de Áreas Protegidas (SERNAP)

El Palmar Integrated Management Natural Area (Área Natural de Manejo Integrado El Palmar) - not to be confused with El Palmar National Park in Argentina - is a protected area in Bolivia located in the Chuquisaca Department, Jaime Zudáñez Province.
