= Jatun Q'asa (Zudáñez) =

Mountain in Bolivia

- Location within Bolivia

Highest point
- Elevation: 3,500 m (11,500 ft)
- Coordinates: 19°38′26″S 64°42′10″W

Geography
- Location: Bolivia, Chuquisaca Department
- Parent range: Andes

Jatun Q'asa (Quechua jatun, hatun big, q'asa mountain pass, "big pass", also spelled Jatun Khasa) is a mountain in the Bolivian Andes which reaches a height of approximately 3,500 m (11,500 ft). It is located in the Chuquisaca Department, Jaime Zudáñez Province, Icla Municipality. Jatun Q'asa lies between the Lampasar River and the Warmi Wañusqa River, southwest of Chullunkhäni.
