= Villa Orias =

Villa Orias Tarvita, Taravita
- Town
- Location of Villa Orias in Bolivia
- Coordinates: 19°55′12″S 64°28′56″W
- Country: Bolivia
- Department: Chuquisaca Department
- Province: Azurduy Province
- Municipality: Tarvita Municipality
- Canton: Tarvita Canton

Population
  - Ethnicities: Quechua
- Time zone: UTC-4 (BOT)

Villa Orias (Tarvita) is a town and administrative centre in Tarvita Municipality, Azurduy Province, Chuquisaca Department of Bolivia. It is in the Cordillera Oriental of the Andes, where the Puca Mayu River and the Cruz Mayu River meet to form the Tarvita River.

== Climate ==
Climate data for Villa Orias (Tarvita), elevation 2,420 m (7,940 ft), (1973–2008)
Month	Jan	Feb	Mar	Apr	May	Jun	Jul	Aug	Sep	Oct	Nov	Dec	Year
Mean daily maximum °C (°F)	26.7 (80.1)	27.0 (80.6)	26.6 (79.9)	27.0 (80.6)	27.1 (80.8)	27.3 (81.1)	27.6 (81.7)	28.0 (82.4)	28.4 (83.1)	28.5 (83.3)	28.4 (83.1)	28.1 (82.6)	27.6 (81.6)
Daily mean °C (°F)	19.5 (67.1)	19.9 (67.8)	19.7 (67.5)	19.4 (66.9)	18.1 (64.6)	17.7 (63.9)	17.8 (64.0)	18.4 (65.1)	19.0 (66.2)	20.0 (68.0)	20.1 (68.2)	20.3 (68.5)	19.2 (66.5)
Mean daily minimum °C (°F)	12.3 (54.1)	12.9 (55.2)	12.8 (55.0)	11.9 (53.4)	9.1 (48.4)	7.9 (46.2)	8.0 (46.4)	8.8 (47.8)	9.5 (49.1)	11.5 (52.7)	11.8 (53.2)	12.5 (54.5)	10.8 (51.3)
Average precipitation mm (inches)	143.9 (5.67)	139.3 (5.48)	121.2 (4.77)	60.6 (2.39)	26.0 (1.02)	20.5 (0.81)	10.9 (0.43)	21.7 (0.85)	39.4 (1.55)	83.1 (3.27)	101.3 (3.99)	124.1 (4.89)	892 (35.12)
Average precipitation days	11.7	12.3	10.7	6.2	2.8	2.1	1.3	2.6	4.3	8.2	8.4	10.0	80.6
Average relative humidity (%)	77.0	79.9	81.3	80.7	72.3	67.4	64.9	62.8	64.4	71.5	75.7	75.1	72.8
Source: Servicio Nacional de Meteorología e Hidrología de Bolivia
