= T'ula Kimray =

Mountain in Bolivia

- Location within Bolivia

Highest point
- Elevation: 3,906 m (12,815 ft)
- Coordinates: 19°22′46″S 64°40′53″W

Geography
- Location: Bolivia, Chuquisaca Department
- Parent range: Andes

T'ula Kimray (Quechua t'ula a kind of plant (Baccharis (sp.)), kimray, kinray slope, "t'ula slope", also spelled Thola Quinray) is a 3,906-metre-high (12,815 ft) mountain in the Bolivian Andes. It is located in the Chuquisaca Department, Jaime Zudáñez Province, Icla Municipality.
