= Tawa Qucha =

Mountain in Bolivia

- Location within Bolivia

Highest point
- Elevation: 3,582 m (11,752 ft)
- Coordinates: 19°49′57″S 64°35′48″W

Geography
- Location: Bolivia, Chuquisaca Department
- Parent range: Andes

Tawa Qucha (Quechua tawa four, qucha lake, "four lakes", also spelled Tahua Khocha) is a 3,582-metre-high (11,752 ft) mountain in the Bolivian Andes. It is located in the Chuquisaca Department, Azurduy Province, Tarvita Municipality. It lies at the Tawa Quchayuq Mayu ("the river with four lakes") whose waters flow to the Pillku Mayu (Quechua for "red river"):
