= Jatun Muqu =

Mountain in Bolivia

- Location within Bolivia

Highest point
- Elevation: 3,420 m (11,220 ft)
- Coordinates: 19°44′36″S 64°34′15″W

Geography
- Location: Bolivia, Chuquisaca Department
- Parent range: Andes

Jatun Muqu (Quechua jatun, hatun big, muqu hill, "big hill", also spelled Jatun Mokho) is a mountain in the Bolivian Andes which reaches a height of approximately 3,420 m (11,220 ft). It is located in the Chuquisaca Department, Azurduy Province, Tarvita Municipality.
