= Wallqayuq Urqu =

Mountain in Bolivia

- Location within Bolivia

Highest point
- Elevation: 4,124 m (13,530 ft)
- Coordinates: 19°37′30″S 64°37′48″W

Geography
- Location: Bolivia, Chuquisaca Department
- Parent range: Andes

Wallqayuq Urqu (Quechua wallqa collar, -yuq a suffix, urqu mountain, "the mountain with a collar", also spelled Huallcayo(j) Orkho) is a 4,124-metre-high (13,530 ft) mountain in the Bolivian Andes. It is located in the Chuquisaca Department, on the border of the Azurduy Province, Tarvita Municipality, and the Jaime Zudáñez Province, Icla Municipality. Wallqayuq Kimray lies west of Wisk'achani and northeast of Wanaku Kimray. The Phaqcha Mayu ("waterfall river") originates south of the mountain. It flows to the south as an affluent of the Qucha Mayu ("lake river") which downstream is named San José. It is a left tributary of the Pillku Mayu (Quechua for "red river").
