= Manuel Ascencio Padilla =

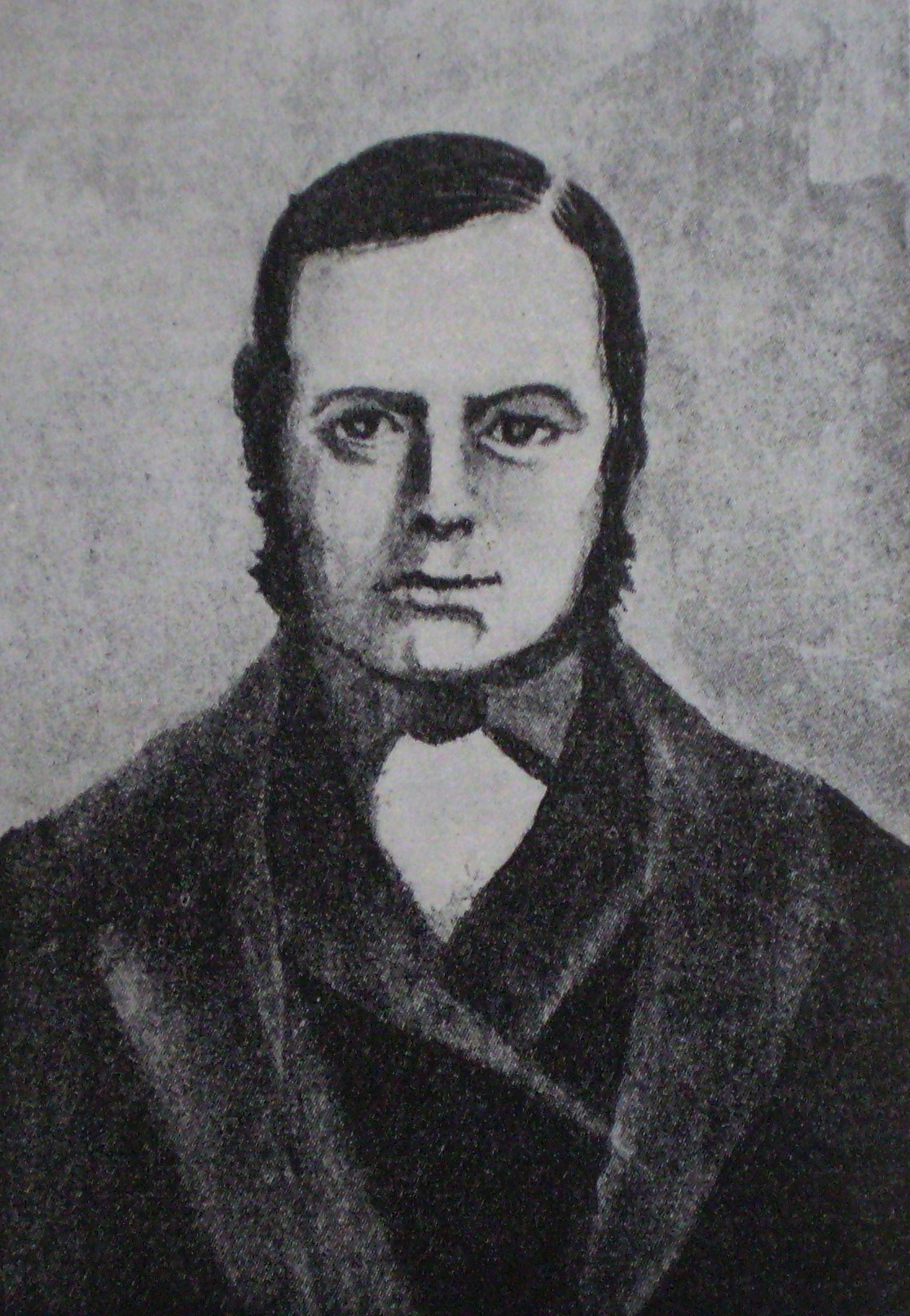
- Manuel Ascencio Padilla
- Born: September 26, 1774; Chipirina, Upper Peru (now Chipirina, Chayanta Province, Bolivia)
- Died: September 14, 1816 (aged 41); El Villar, Upper Peru, (now El Villar, Bolivia)
- Relatives: Wife, Juana Azurduy de Padilla
- Military career
- Allegiance: Revolutionaries for the Bolivian War of Independence
- Rank: Commandante

Historian, writer and diplomat Valentín Abecia Baldivieso referred to Padilla as, "a hero with the soul of a child and the heart of a lion."

—

Commandante Manuel Ascencio Padilla (or Manuel Ascensio Padilla) (September 26, 1774 – September 14, 1816) was an Upper Peruvian guerrilla chief who fought in the Bolivian War of Independence with his wife, Juana Azurduy de Padilla who shared his commitment towards Bolivian indigenous populations. The town of Padilla, Bolivia is named in his honor.

== Early years ==
A Criollo, Padilla was born in 1774 in Chipirina, Upper Peru (now part of Chayanta Province, Bolivia). He was the son of a local landowner. He spent the early years of his life near his hometown, joining the army at an early age. He participated in the enforcement and execution of Damaso Katari, Tupac Amaru's successor in La Paz.

He began studying to be a lawyer at the University of Saint Francis Xavier, but left school to marry Juana Azurduy (born 1781) in 1805. Her father was Spanish and her mother was Chola (3/4 Native, 1/4 Spaniard).

== Career ==
Padilla joined revolutionaries in the War of Independence on May 25, 1809, the day of the Chuquisaca Revolution, and briefly fled to hide in the Amerindian villages of the highlands. In 1810, when the city of Cochabamba refrained from recognizing the May Revolution, Padilla was named civil and military commander of a wide area between Chuquisaca (today Sucre), Cochabamba and Santa Cruz de la Sierra, It was referred to as the Republiqueta de La Laguna ("Republic of La Laguna"). From the town of Padilla (then La Laguna), he was supported by 2,000 Indian guerrillas from Esteban Arce Province. Padilla was highly esteemed by General Manuel Belgrano and by Esteban Arze, who conferred the title of Commandante upon Padilla. His wife was later honored by Belgrano for her bravery in 1816.

Although he won a victory in the town of Pintatora, he was defeated in Tacobamba. He retired to the south and joined the exodus from Jujuy under the orders of Belgrano. He participated in the battles of Tucuman and Salta. He returned to Upper Peru in mid-1813 and brought together a large contingent of nearly ten thousand men. This group of rebellious Indians who supported Bartolomé Mitre were part of the Republic of La Laguna. Belgrano used them as guides and for the transportation of guns across the mountains. Padilla began an effective guerrilla war against the royalists in Mojotoro, Yamparáez, Tarabuco, Tomin, La Laguna (now "Padilla"), and a neighboring village of Azurduy. Other leaders, such as Ignacio Warnes, Juan Antonio Álvarez de Arenales and Vicente Camargo, also organized guerrilla resistance. After several weeks of fighting, the enemy seized the four children of Padilla and killed the two boys. Then the girls were used as bait to catch the Padillas. The response of Padilla and his wife, followed by some soldiers, was furious, blindly attacking their enemies to kill them. Though initially rescued, the girls died days later. From that time, he became one of the most violent leaders of Upper Peru.

During the third expedition to Upper Peru, he took the city of Chuquisaca. After a series of minor battles, his forces were surrounded. Padilla was killed by the royalist Colonel (later General) Francisco Javier Aguilera in El Villar, Upper Peru, (now El Villar, Bolivia) at the Battle of La Laguna while defending his homeland after being pierced by a saber. Padilla was subsequently beheaded.

Padilla and his wife had five children, only the youngest of whom, a daughter, survived the War of Independence.

== Popular culture ==
The song "Manuel Ascencio Padilla" is included on the 1977 La marche et le drapeau album by the instrumental and vocal folk music group Quilapayún.
