= Wanaku (Chuquisaca) =

Mountain in Bolivia

- Location within Bolivia

Highest point
- Elevation: 3,844 m (12,612 ft)
- Coordinates: 19°40′32″S 64°38′45″W

Geography
- Location: Bolivia, Chuquisaca Department
- Parent range: Andes

Wanaku (Aymara and Quechua for guanaco, also spelled Huanaco) is a 3,844-metre-high (12,612 ft) mountain in the Bolivian Andes. It is located in the Chuquisaca Department, Azurduy Province, Tarvita Municipality. Wanaku lies south of Wanaku Kimray, northwest of the village of Panti Pampa.
