= Uritu Mayu =

- Location of the mouth in Bolivia
- Etymology: Quechua

Location
- Country: Bolivia
- Region: Chuquisaca Department, Jaime Zudáñez Province

Physical characteristics
- Source
  - location: Icla Municipality
- Mouth
  - location: Icla Municipality
  - coordinates: 19°30′06″S 64°49′07″W

Uritu Mayu (Quechua uritu speaking parrot, mayu river, "speking parrot river", also spelled Orito Mayu) is a Bolivian river in the Chuquisaca Department, Jaime Zudáñez Province, Icla Municipality. It is a left affluent of the Pillku Mayu.
