= Q'illu Qisqa =

Mountain in Bolivia

- Location within Bolivia

Highest point
- Elevation: 2,660 m (8,730 ft)
- Coordinates: 19°26′42″S 64°47′55″W

Geography
- Location: Bolivia, Chuquisaca Department
- Parent range: Andes

Q'illu Qisqa (Quechua q'illu yellow, qisqa, qhisqa flint, "yellow flint", also spelled Khellu Khisca) is a mountain in the Bolivian Andes which reaches a height of approximately 2,660 m (8,730 ft). It is located in the Chuquisaca Department, Jaime Zudáñez Province, Icla Municipality. Q'illu Qisqa lies at the Icla River which is a left tributary of the Pillku Mayu ("red river").
