= Qallu Urqu =

Mountain in Bolivia

- Location within Bolivia

Highest point
- Elevation: 3,580 m (11,750 ft)
- Coordinates: 19°23′45″S 64°39′30″W

Geography
- Location: Bolivia, Chuquisaca Department
- Parent range: Andes

Qallu Urqu (Quechua qallu tongue urqu mountain, "tongue mountain", also spelled Gallo Orkho) is a mountain in the Bolivian Andes which reaches a height of approximately 3,580 m (11,750 ft). It is located in the Chuquisaca Department, at the border of the Jaime Zudáñez Province, Icla Municipality, and the Tomina Province, Sopachuy Municipality.
