= Liwqiyuq Punta =

Mountain in Bolivia

- Location within Bolivia

Highest point
- Elevation: 3,546 m (11,634 ft)
- Coordinates: 19°32′06″S 64°36′47″W

Geography
- Location: Bolivia, Chuquisaca Department
- Parent range: Andes

Liwqiyuq Punta (Quechua liwqi gull, -yuq a suffix, liwqiyuq "with gulls" also spelled Leukheyoj Punta) is a 3,546-metre-high (11,634 ft) mountain in the Bolivian Andes. It is located in the Chuquisaca Department, Tomina Province, Sopachuy Municipality.
