= Phutunqu =

Mountain in Bolivia

- Location within Bolivia

Highest point
- Elevation: 3,090 m (10,140 ft)
- Coordinates: 19°55′48″S 64°35′34″W

Geography
- Location: Bolivia, Chuquisaca Department
- Parent range: Andes

Phutunqu (Aymara for a small vessel or a hole, pit, crater, also spelled Phutunkhu) is a 3,090-metre-high (10,140 ft) mountain in the Bolivian Andes. It is located in the Chuquisaca Department, Azurduy Province, Tarvita Municipality. It lies west of the San Antonio River which is a left tributary of the Pillku Mayu (Quechua for "red river").
