= Azurduy Province =

Azurduy
- Province
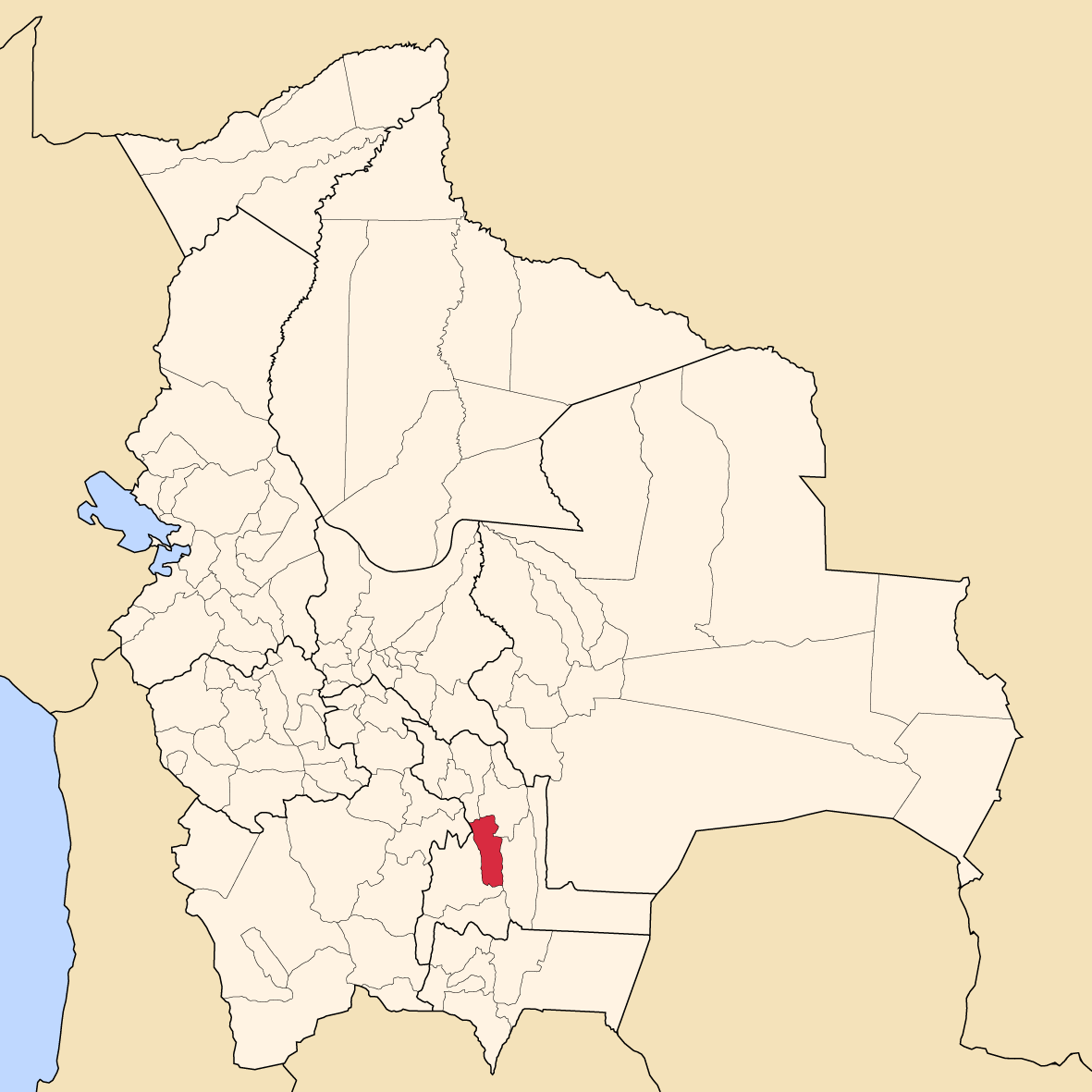
- Location of Azurduy Province within Bolivia
- Coordinates: 20°01′00″S 64°29′00″W
- Country: Bolivia
- Department: Chuquisaca Department
- Capital: Azurduy

Area
  - Total: 1,171 sq mi (3,034 km^{2})

Population (2024 census)
  - Total: 24,331
  - Density: 20.77/sq mi (8.019/km^{2})
  - Ethnicities: Quechua
- Time zone: UTC-4 (BOT)

Azurduy Province (full official name: Província de Juana Azurduy de Padilla) is a province in the Chuquisaca Department in Bolivia. Its seat is the town of Azurduy. It was named in honor of revolutionary guerrilla Juana Azurduy de Padilla. In the 2024 census it had a population of 24,331.

== Geography ==
Some of the highest mountains of the province are listed below:

- Chullunkhäni
- Chhichayuq
- Inka Wasi
- Jatun Muqu
- Jatun Pampa
- Jatun Q'asa
- Kimsa Muquyuq
- Kunturiri
- Llusk'a
- Misa Pampa
- Muyu Urqu
- Phutunqu
- Rumi Rumi
- Sunch'u Mayu
- Tawa Qucha
- T'uru Pampa
- Wallqayuq Urqu
- Wanaku
- Wanaku Kimray
- Wisk'achani
- Wisk'achayuq
- Yana Muqu

== Subdivisions ==
The province is divided into two municipalities which are further subdivided into six cantons.

Section	Municipality	Cantons	Seat
1st	Azurduy Municipality	Azurduy Canton	Azurduy
		Las Casas Canton	Torrecillas
		Antonio Lopez Canton	San Antonio
2nd	Tarvita Municipality	Tarvita Canton	Villa Orías (Tarvita)
		San Pedro Canton	San Pedro
		Mariscal Braun Canton	Mariscal Braun
