= P'isaqayuq =

Mountain in Bolivia

- Location within Bolivia

Highest point
- Elevation: 3,600 m (11,800 ft)
- Coordinates: 19°26′19″S 64°41′12″W

Geography
- Location: Bolivia, Chuquisaca Department
- Parent range: Andes

P'isaqayuq (Quechua p'isaqa Nothoprocta -yuq a suffix, "the one with Nothoprocta", also spelled Pisacayo) is a mountain in the Bolivian Andes which reaches a height of approximately 3,600 m (11,800 ft). It is located in the Chuquisaca Department, Jaime Zudáñez Province, Icla Municipality.
