= Puka Urqu (Chuquisaca) =

Mountain in Bolivia

- Location within Bolivia

Highest point
- Elevation: 3,220 m (10,560 ft)
- Coordinates: 19°21′26″S 64°51′50″W

Geography
- Location: Bolivia, Chuquisaca Department
- Parent range: Andes

Puka Urqu (Quechua puka red, urqu mountain, "red mountain", also spelled Puca Orkho) is a mountain in the Bolivian Andes which reaches a height of approximately 3,220 m (10,560 ft). It is located in the Chuquisaca Department, Jaime Zudáñez Province, Icla Municipality.
