= Tomina =

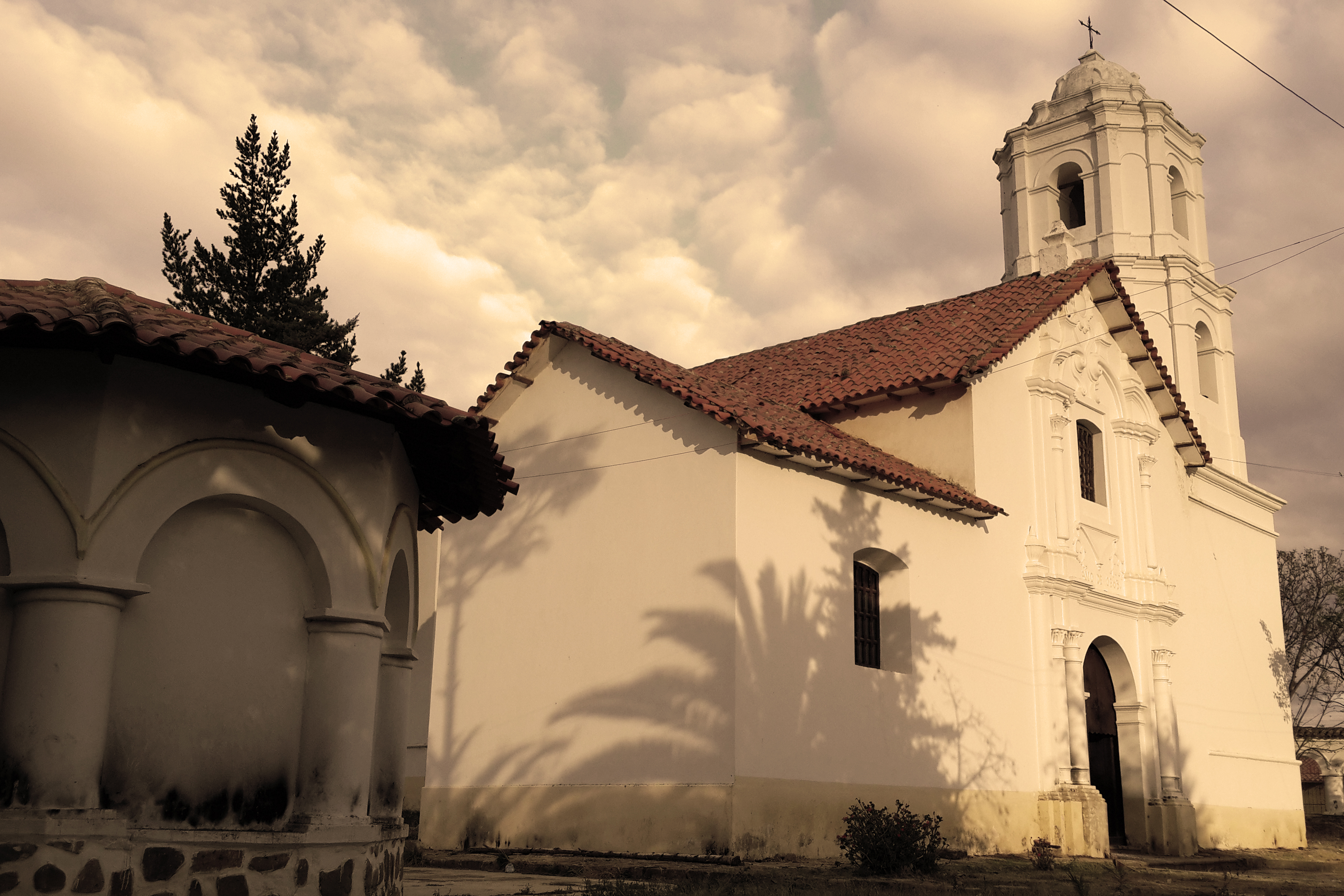
- San Mauro church in Tomina

- Location within Bolivia
- Coordinates: 19°11′S 64°28′W
- Country: Bolivia
- Department: Chuquisaca Department
- Province: Tomina Province
- Municipality: Tomina Municipality
- Canton: Tomina Canton

Government
  - Mayor: Robustiano Mejias Otalora (2007)

Population (2001)
  - Total: 983
  - Ethnicities: Quechua
- Time zone: UTC-4 (BOT)

Tomina is the seat of the homonymous municipality located in the Tomina Province in the Chuquisaca Department of Bolivia. At the time of the 2001 census it had 983 inhabitants.
