= Juana Azurduy de Padilla =

Guerrilla military leader

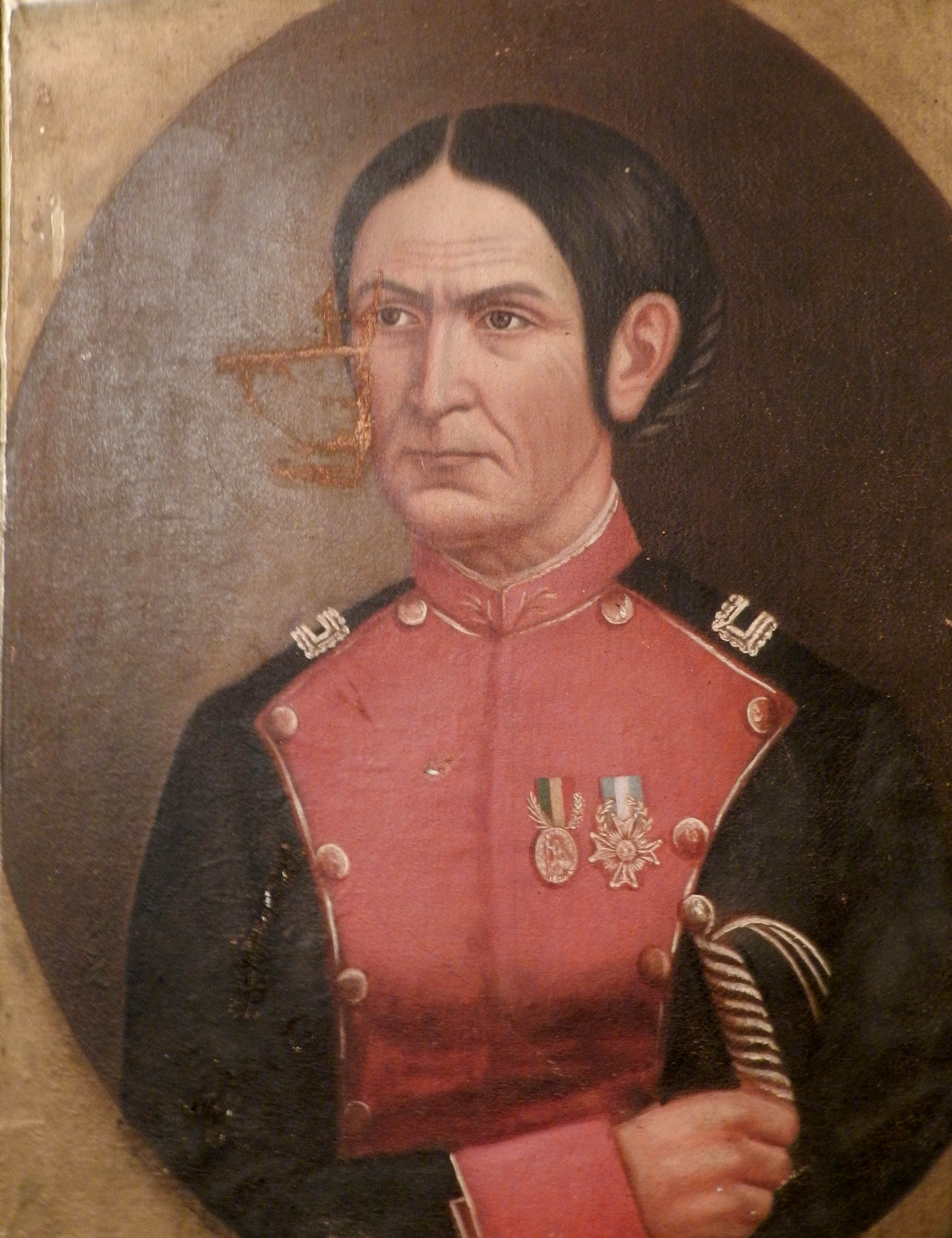
- Portrait of Juana Azurduy, circa 1857
- Born: Juana Azurduy Llanos; July 12, 1780; Chuquisaca, Viceroyalty of the Río de la Plata (modern Sucre, Bolivia)
- Died: May 25, 1862 (aged 81); Sucre, Bolivia
- Spouse: Manuel Ascencio Padilla

Juana Azurduy de Padilla (July 12, 1780 – May 25, 1862) was a guerrilla military leader from Chuquisaca, Viceroyalty of the Río de la Plata (now Sucre, Bolivia). She fought for Bolivian and Argentine independence alongside her husband, Manuel Ascencio Padilla, earning the rank of Lieutenant Colonel. She was noted for her strong support for and military leadership of the indigenous people of Upper Peru. Today, she is regarded as an independence hero in both Bolivia and Argentina.

In 2015, in Buenos Aires, Argentina, a statue of Azurduy replaced the one of Christopher Columbus in front of the Centro Cultural Kirchner, in order to recognize her work and efforts during the War of Independence.

== Biography ==
=== Early life ===
Juana Azurduy was born on July 12, 1780, in Chuquisaca, Upper Peru, a territory of the Spanish Viceroyalty of the Río de la Plata. Her father, Don Matías Azurduy, was a white Spaniard of Basque origin, patrón of an hacienda in Toroca. Her mother, Doña Eulalia Bermudez, was a chola (a woman with a mestizo and an indigenous parent) from a poor family in Chuquisaca. Her family was unusual under the strict casta system of Spanish colonial rule, under which Juana was considered mestiza. She had an older brother, Blas, who died in infancy, and a younger sister, Rosalía. After the death of her mother in 1787, she developed an especially close relationship with her father. Despite the staunchly Catholic and conservative gender roles of colonial society, Don Matías taught her to become a skilled rider and sharpshooter, and she accompanied him to work the land alongside indigenous laborers. As well as her native Spanish, she became fluent in Quechua and Aymara, the languages of the local indigenous people, and she was known to spend days at a time in their villages.

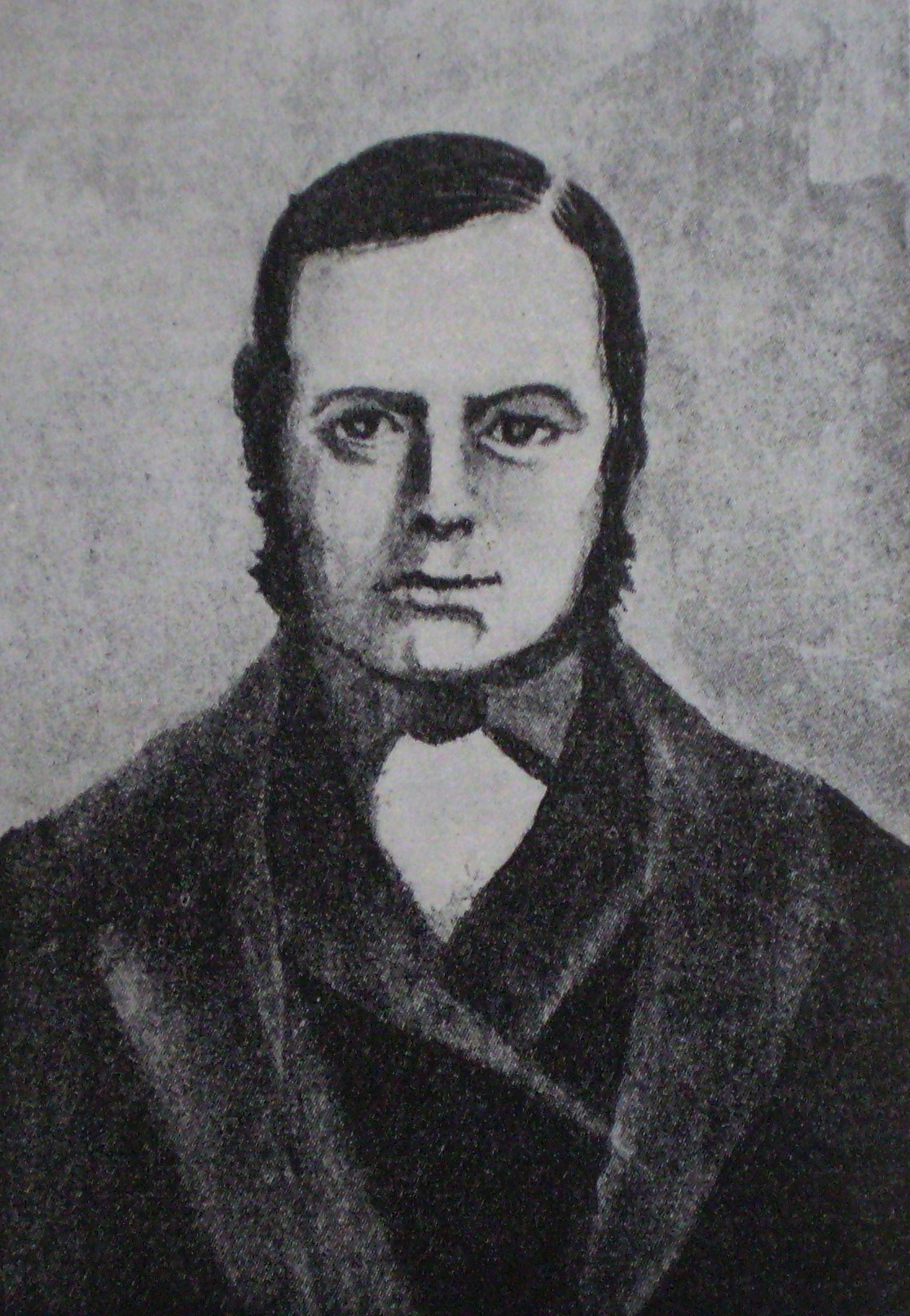
Manuel Ascensio Padilla, husband of Juana Azurduy.

In her early teens, the death of their father left the Azurduy sisters orphans. They became wards of their aunt Petrona Azurduy and her husband Francisco Días Vayo, who administered the properties left by Don Matías to the girls upon their adulthood. Doña Petrona found Juana's unconventional behavior both undesirable and difficult to control. A tutor was hired to provide her both academic and social instruction, but failed to tame Juana's frequent rebellious outbursts. When Juana rebelled against her aunt's control, she was sent away to the prestigious Convento de Santa Teresa de Chuquisaca to become a nun. During her time there, classmates remember Azurduy idolizing the warrior Saint Joan of Arc and declaring her aspirations for the battlefield. Due to her rebellious temperament and clashes with the Sisters, Azurduy was expelled from the convent at the age of 17.

In 1797, Azurduy returned to live on her father's hacienda, spending her days with the indigenous people who lived on his land. She witnessed the brutality of their work in Spanish silver mines, and became a passionate ally to the indigenous revolutionary movement. In 1805, Azurduy married her neighbor and childhood friend Manuel Ascencio Padilla, a fellow revolutionary who left a Royalist law school to join the independence movement. Their marriage was remarkably progressive, with Padilla standing alongside his wife on and off the battlefield. Before their military career began, the Padillas had two sons. Both would die tragically young due to disease and malnutrition in military camps.

=== Military life and career ===
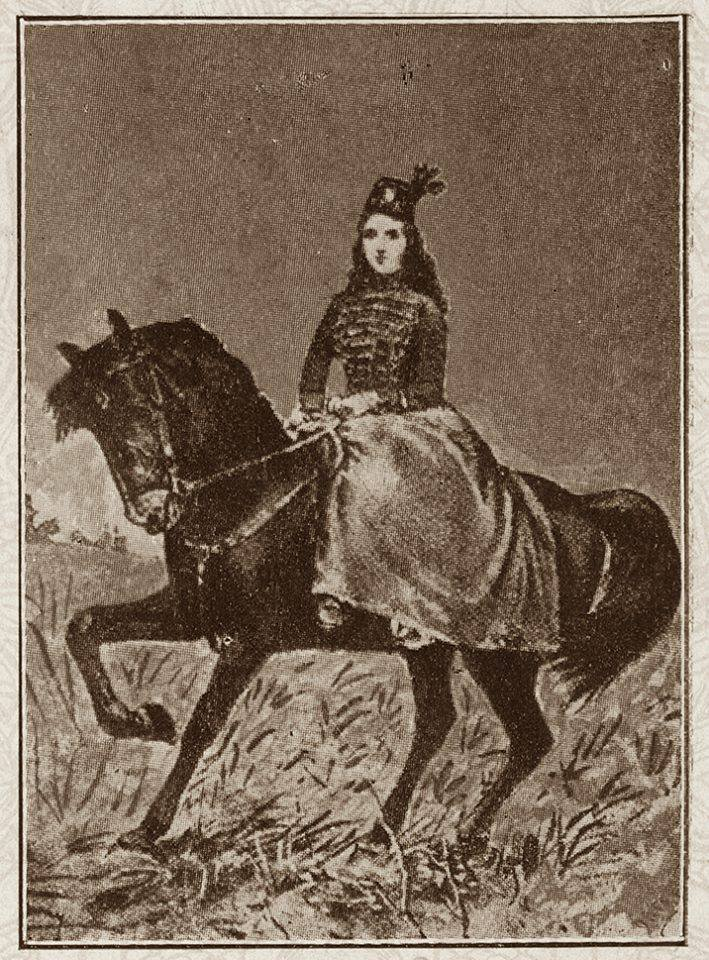
Portrait of Juana Azurduy, date unknown

On May 25, 1809, Azurduy and her husband joined the Chuquisaca Revolution, which ousted the governor of the Real Audencia of Charcas, Ramón García de León y Pizarro, and in September 1810, established a governing Junta de Buenos Aires. The revolutionary government was forced out of Chuquisaca in 1811 by royalist troops, but across the Viceroyalty, rebels maintained control of a patchwork of republiquetas, or independent territories. In the fighting, Azurduy was captured and held prisoner in her home by Spanish soldiers, but Padilla killed her guards in a successful rescue. The Padilla couple escaped Chuquisaca in 1811 to the republiqueta of La Laguna, where they continued to organize rebel forces.

In 1811, the couple joined the Army of the North under José Castelli and Antonio Balcarce, sent from newly independent Buenos Aires to fight the Spanish occupation of Upper Peru. They attempted to block invasion of Upper Peru by the Spanish army of the Viceroyalty of Peru, but were outnumbered and eventually defeated, in the June 20 Battle of Huaqui. The hacienda properties of the Padillas were confiscated and Juana Azurduy and her sons were captured, though Padilla managed to rescue them, taking refuge in the heights of Tarabuco.

In 1812 Padilla and Juana Azurduy served under General Manuel Belgrano, the new head of the Army of the North, helping him to recruit 10,000 militiamen across the republiqueta system. Azurduy was a famous recruiting force, inspiring indigenous people, criados, and other women, known as the Amazonas, to join the cause. When their mountain territories became overrun by royalist forces, their militia served as the rear guard for generals Belgrano and Eustoquio Díaz Vélez as they retreated and regrouped in independent Argentina.

Azurduy then took charge of the "Loyal Battalions," a fighting force of indigenous men and women known for their fierce loyalty to their commander. With only slingshots and wooden spears, the "Loyals" covered the retreat of the Army of the North in the Battle of Ayohuma on November 14, 1813. General Belgrano was so impressed with her leadership and the bravery of her soldiers that he gifted her his own sword, symbolic of his military power. The Argentine Army of the North, outnumbered and outgunned, was eventually beat back to their border, and the Padilla couple began a phase of guerrilla warfare.

During an 1815 battle at Pintatora, Azurduy left the battlefield to give birth to her fourth son. In an act that would become legend, she returned hours later to the front lines to rally her troops, and personally captured the standard of the defeated Spanish forces. On March 3, 1816, near Villa, Bolivia, Azurduy led 30 cavalry, including her Amazonas, to attack the La Hera Spanish forces. The women captured their standard and a valuable cache of rifles and ammunitions for their undersupplied forces. On March 8, 1816, Azurduy's cavalry forces temporarily captured the Cerro Rico of Potosí, the main source of Spanish silver, also leading a charge which captured the enemy standard. When word of these victories reached General Juan Martín de Pueyrredón of the Argentine army, he formally granted her the title of Lieutenant Colonel in an August 16, 1816, ceremony.

During the Battle of La Laguna in September 1816, Juana, who was expecting her fifth child, was injured, and her husband was shot and captured by Spanish forces while trying to rescue her. He was beheaded by Royalists on September 14, and his head was mounted on a pike in the village of Laguna. Juana found herself in a desperate situation: single, pregnant and with Royalist armies effectively controlling the territory. With the death of Padilla, the northern guerilla forces dissolved, and Juana was forced to survive in the region of Salta. She led a counterattack to recover the body of her husband.

In 1818 the Spanish temporarily took control of Chuquisaca, and she was forced to flee again with her soldiers to Northern Argentina, where she continued to fight under the command of the Argentinean General Martín Miguel de Güemes. She was appointed to the position of commander of the Northern Army of the Revolutionary Government of the United Provinces of the Rio de la Plata. She was able to establish an independent zone on the border between Argentina and Upper Peru until the Spanish forces withdrew from the area. At the highest point of her control, she commanded an army with an estimated strength of 6,000 men.

=== Later life ===
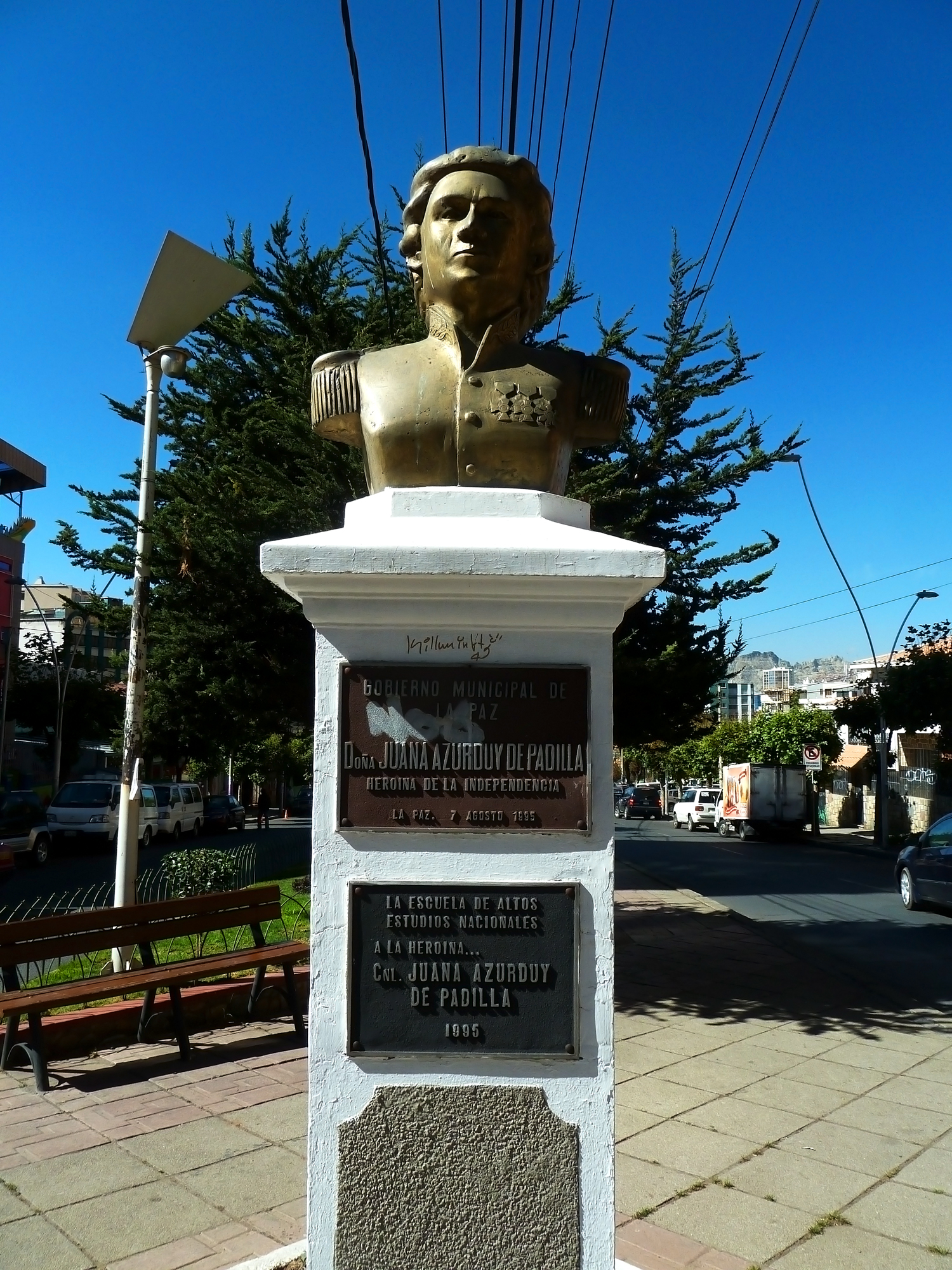
Monument to Juana Azurduy in La Paz (2013)

In 1825, upon the withdrawal of Spanish forces from Upper Peru, Azurduy petitioned the independent government for aid in returning to her hometown, newly renamed Sucre. In 1825, Azurduy was granted a Colonel's military pension by the independent government under Simón Bolívar. After visiting Azurduy to commend her service, Bolívar commented to Marshal Antonio José de Sucre: "This country should not be named Bolivia in my honor, but Padilla or Azurduy, because it was they who made it free."

In her old age, Azurduy adopted an indigenous boy named Indalecio Sandi, who cared for her. The two traveled to Salta to petition the Bolivian government for the return of her father's property, seized by the Spanish. In 1857, her pension was revoked during bureaucratic reorganization under the government of José María Linares. Azurduy died impoverished on May 25, 1862, at the age of 82, and was buried in a communal grave.

== Legacy ==
At the time of her death on May 25, 1862, the anniversary of the 1810 revolution in Argentina, she was forgotten and in poverty, but was remembered as a hero only a century later. Her remains were exhumed 100 years later and moved to a mausoleum constructed in her honor in the city of Sucre. In Bolivia, President Evo Morales named her birthday (July 12) as the Day of Argentine-Bolivian Fellowship. The air terminal at Sucre is named Juana Azurduy de Padilla International Airport. The Azurduy Province in Bolivia is also named for her.

In 2009, President Néstor Kirchner raised her posthumously to the rank of general of the Argentine Army. The National Programme for Women's Rights and Participation of Argentina named after her. Azurduy was also the subject of a children's cartoon designed to promote knowledge of Argentine history. In spring 2014, a bas relief sculpture of Azurduy was on display as part of an outdoor exhibition of famous Latin Americans in the Pan American Union Building in Washington, D.C.

=== Controversy of Azurduy statue in Buenos Aires ===
In July 2015, a 25-ton, 52-foot-high statue of Azurduy commissioned by Argentine president Cristina Fernández de Kirchner with the aid of a US$1 million donation by Bolivian president Evo Morales. Azurduy was an exemplar of the forgotten or suppressed history of the nation's indigenous populations. The Argentine sculptor and activist for indigenous rights chosen for the commission, Andrés Zerneri, said the Azurduy monument provided Argentines with "a way of seeing our identity", articulating "not just a representation of our shared past, but also a call for future action." The huge statue was inaugurated in the space where a statue of Cristopher Columbus stood, donated by the Argentine Italian community for the 1910 centennial of Argentine independence. As of December 2015, months after its inauguration, it showed weather damage. With Fernández de Kirchner succeeded by conservative Mauricio Macri in the presidency and a vote by the municipal government of Buenos Aires, and due to the construction of the Paseo del Bajo highway, the Azurduy statue was moved to the Plaza del Correo, in front of the "Palacio de Correos y Telecomunicaciones", which hosts the Kirchner Cultural Centre, and Zerneri was able to repair the statue, which had been inaugurated in a rush before Kirchner left office.

== See also ==
- History of Bolivia (1809–1920)
- Argentine War of Independence
- Women in warfare and the military in the 19th century
- Feminist history
