= Jatun Q'asa (Azurduy) =

Mountain in the Bolivian Andes

- Location within Bolivia

Highest point
- Elevation: 3,526 m (11,568 ft)
- Coordinates: 19°51′28″S 64°36′57″W

Geography
- Location: Bolivia, Chuquisaca Department
- Parent range: Andes

Jatun Q'asa (Quechua jatun, hatun big, q'asa mountain pass, "big pass", also spelled Jatun Khasa) is a 3,526-metre-high (11,568 ft) mountain in the Bolivian Andes. It is located in the Chuquisaca Department, Azurduy Province, Tarvita Municipality. Llaqta Punta is the neighboring peak to the northwest.
