= Tacobamba =

Coordinates: 16.8944°S 67.9358°W

- Town
- Interactive map of Tacobamba
- Country: Bolivia
- Department: La Paz
- Province: Loayza
- Municipality: Sapahaqui

Population (2024)
  - Total: 525
- Time zone: UTC-4 (BOT)

Tacobamba is a small town in Bolivia.
