= Wisk'achayuq (Bolivia) =

Mountain in Bolivia

- Location within Bolivia

Highest point
- Elevation: 3,800 m (12,500 ft)
- Coordinates: 19°26′47″S 64°40′04″W

Geography
- Location: Bolivia, Chuquisaca Department
- Parent range: Andes

Wisk'achayuq (Quechua wisk'acha viscacha -yuq a suffix, "the one with viscachas", also spelled Viscachayoj, Wiscachayo) is a mountain in the Bolivian Andes which reaches a height of approximately 3,800 m (12,500 ft). It is located in the Chuquisaca Department, on the border of the Jaime Zudáñez Province, Icla Municipality, and the Tomina Province, Sopachuy Municipality.
