= Llusk'a =

Mountain in Bolivia

- Location within Bolivia

Highest point
- Elevation: 3,816 m (12,520 ft)
- Coordinates: 19°45′50″S 64°35′28″W

Geography
- Location: Bolivia, Chuquisaca Department
- Parent range: Andes

Llusk'a (Quechua for polished, slippery, also spelled Lluskha) is a 3,816-metre-high (12,520 ft) mountain in the Bolivian Andes. It is located in the Chuquisaca Department, Azurduy Province, Tarvita Municipality.
