= Jaime Zudáñez Province =

Jaime Zudáñez
- Province
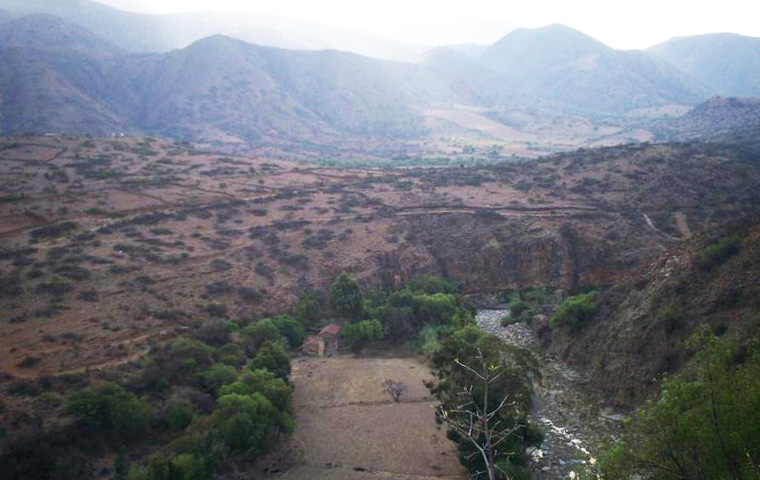
- A river valley near Presto

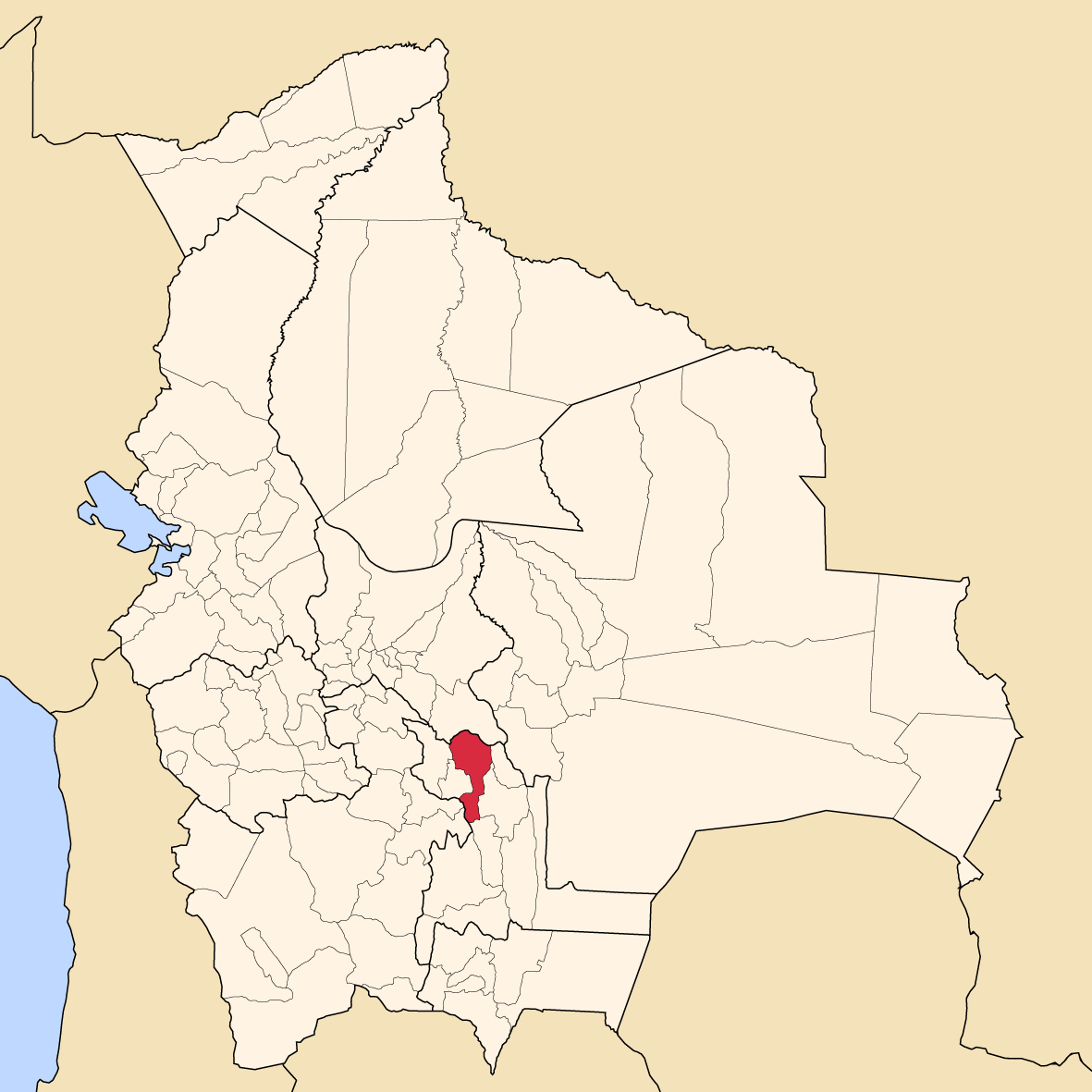
- Location of Jaime Zudáñez Province within Bolivia
- Coordinates: 19°01′00″S 64°42′00″W
- Country: Bolivia
- Department: Chuquisaca Department
- Capital: Zudáñez

Area
  - Total: 1,592 sq mi (4,124 km^{2})

Population (2024 census)
  - Total: 42,535
  - Density: 26.71/sq mi (10.31/km^{2})
  - Ethnicities: Quechua
- Time zone: UTC-4 (BOT)

Jaime Zudáñez is a province in the Bolivian department of Chuquisaca. It was named after Jaime de Zudáñez, emancipation leader born in Chuquisaca in 1772.

== Geography ==
Some of the highest mountains of the province are listed below:

- Awila Mayu
- Chullunkhäni
- Jatun Q'asa
- Llawi Q'asa
- Llusk'a Qaqa
- Muruq'uyuq
- Puka Punta
- Puka Qaqa
- Puka Urqu
- P'isaqayuq
- Qallu Urqu
- Quchayuq
- Q'illu Qisqa
- Sankha Q'asa
- Surama T'uqu
- T'ula Kimray
- Uspha T'uqu
- Wallqayuq Urqu
- Wisk'achayuq
- Yana Qaqa
- Yana Urqu

== Subdivision ==
The province is divided into four municipalities which are further subdivided into cantons.

Section	Municipality	Seat
1st	Tacopaya Municipality or Zudáñez Municipality	Tacopaya or Zudáñez
2nd	Presto Municipality	Presto
3rd	Mojocoya Municipality	Mojocoya
4th	Icla Municipality or Ricardo Mujia Municipality	Icla

== Places of interest ==
- El Palmar Integrated Management Natural Area

== See also ==
- Jatun Mayu
- Uritu Mayu
