= Yana Qaqa (Chuquisaca) =

Mountain in Bolivia

- Location within Bolivia

Highest point
- Elevation: 3,148 m (10,328 ft)
- Coordinates: 19°23′50″S 64°49′40″W

Geography
- Location: Bolivia, Chuquisaca Department
- Parent range: Andes

Yana Qaqa (Quechua yana black, qaqa rock, "black rock", also spelled Yana Khakha) is a 3,148-metre-high (10,328 ft) mountain in the Bolivian Andes. It is located in the Chuquisaca Department, Jaime Zudáñez Province, Icla Municipality. Yana Qaqa lies north of Uspha T'uqu.
