= Tarvita Municipality =

Tarvita
- Municipality
- Location of the Tarvita Municipality within Bolivia
- Country: Bolivia
- Department: Chuquisaca
- Province: Azurduy

Government
  - Mayor: Antonio Vidales Quispe (MTS, 2026)

Area
  - Total: 1,354 km^{2} (523 sq mi)

Population (2024)
  - Total: 16,812
  - Density: 12/km^{2} (31/sq mi)
  - Ethnicities: Quechua
- 2024 Bolivian census
- Time zone: UTC-4 (BOT)

Tarvita Municipality is the second municipal section of the Azurduy Province in the Chuquisaca Department in Bolivia. Tarvita Municipality is the more populous of the two municipalities in Azurduy Province, but it covers a smaller area.

== Government ==
The Mayor of Tarvita is Antonio Vidales Quispe, who was elected in the March 2026 elections.

Tarvita has a municipal council with seven seats, as do all municipalities with populations between 15,001 and 50,000.

Seat	Type	Name	Party / Political Organization
1	Member	Francisco Aramayo Meléndrez	MTS
1	Alternate	Amalia Peñaranda Mendoza	MTS
2	Member	Gregoria Rocha Cáceres	LIBRE
2	Alternate	Nicanor Baldivieso Cáceres	LIBRE
3	Member	Vicente Soto Rivera	AGN
3	Alternate	Jhanine Carla Rivera	AGN
4	Member	Serafín Ballejos Santos	XS-CH
4	Alternate	Guillermina Oropeza León	XS-CH
5	Member	Margarita Ángelo Medina	MTS
5	Alternate	Antonio Montero Flores	MTS
6	Member	Wálter León Zamudio	LIBRE
6	Alternate	Rosalía Flores Vargas	LIBRE
7	Member	Javier Castro Arancibia	PATRIA-UNIDOS
7	Alternate	Sunilda Heredia Rendón	PATRIA-UNIDOS
Source: Supreme Electoral Tribunal.

== Population ==
Population in Recent Censuses
1992	2001	2012	2024
12,674	16,230	14,261	16,812

Population pyramid 2024
%	Males	Age	Females	%
0.8		85+		0.9
0.8		80–84		0.8
1.0		75–79		1.0
1.3		70–74		1.4
1.4		65–69		1.4
1.9		60–64		2.0
1.9		55–59		1.9
2.4		50–54		2.1
2.5		45–49		2.6
2.8		40–44		2.5
2.8		35–39		2.9
3.0		30–34		3.1
3.7		25–29		3.9
3.7		20–24		4.5
5.0		15–19		5.6
5.1		10–14		5.0
5.0		5–9		4.9
4.3		0–4		4.4
- Source: 2024 Bolivian Census

== Languages and Indigenous identification ==
Ethnic identification (2024)
Group	Population	%
Quechua	12,363	73.5%
Unspecified Indigenous	275	1.6%
Campesino	200	1.2%
Source: 2024 Bolivian Census

Languages spoken
Language	2024 speakers	2024%	2012 speakers	2012%
Quechua	13,198	78.5%	11,071	77.6%
Spanish	11,037	65.6%	7,073	49.6%
Source: 2024 Bolivian Census

== Communities ==
The following communities are located within the municipality:

- Cruz Mayu
- Pucamayu
- Thacos
- Cuñuri Pampa
- El Salto
- Katari Pampa
- Molleni
- Tarvita
- Kollpa Pampa
- Yerba Buena
- Thaco Pampa
- Sumala
- Guitarrani
- Tranquitas
- La Muralla
- Abra Ckasa
- Capactala
- Inca Pampa
- La Sillada
- Mara Pampa
- Mosoj Llajta
- Pampa Grande
- Pujyini
- Quinua Chacra
- San Isidro de Marcavi
- San Jose de Alisos
- San Luis
- San Miguel de Marcavi
- El Chaco
- Granizos
- Molle Cancha
- Horcani
- San Jose de Troje
- Visanche
- Chunca Kancha
- Pampa Huasi
- Manzanayoj
- Molle Pampa
- Pampas de Leque
- Huachaca
- Torre Pampa
- La Muralla
- San Juan de los Pinos
- Rio Grande
- San Pedro
- Tarea Pampa
- Trigo Loma
- Villa Pampa
- El Bañado
- Cruz Qasa
- Trancas
- Kollpa Pampa
