= Chullunkhäni (Chuquisaca) =

Mountain in Bolivia

- Location within Bolivia

Highest point
- Elevation: 4,168 m (13,675 ft)
- Coordinates: 19°37′04″S 64°41′19″W

Geography
- Location: Bolivia, Chuquisaca Department
- Parent range: Andes

Chullunkhäni (Aymara chullunkhä ('ä' stands for a long 'a') icicle, -ni a suffix, "the one with icicles", also spelled Chulluncani) is a 4,168-metre-high (13,675 ft) mountain in the Bolivian Andes. It is located in the Chuquisaca Department, Azurduy Province, Tarvita Municipality, and in the Jaime Zudáñez Province, Icla Municipality.
