= Wanaku Kimray =

Mountain in Bolivia

- Location within Bolivia

Highest point
- Elevation: 4,084 m (13,399 ft)
- Coordinates: 19°38′15″S 64°38′32″W

Geography
- Location: Bolivia, Chuquisaca Department
- Parent range: Andes

Wanaku Kimray (Quechua wanaku guanaco, kimray slope, "guanaco slope", also spelled Huanaco Quimray) is a 4,084-metre-high (13,399 ft) mountain in the Bolivian Andes. It is located in the Chuquisaca Department, Azurduy Province, Tarvita Municipality. Wanaku Kimray lies southwest of Wallqayuq Urqu and north of Muyu Urqu.
