= Jatun Mayu (Chuquisaca) =

- Etymology: Quechua

Location
- Country: Bolivia
- Region: Chuquisaca Department, Jaime Zudáñez Province

Physical characteristics
- Source
  - location: Icla Municipality
  - coordinates: 19°24′27″S 64°41′50″W
- Mouth
  - location: Icla Municipality
  - coordinates: 19°21′55″S 64°47′34″W

Jatun Mayu (Quechua hatun, jatun great, mayu river, "great river") is a Bolivian river in the Chuquisaca Department, Jaime Zudáñez Province, Icla Municipality. It is a left affluent of the Icla River. It belongs to the watershed of the Pillku Mayu.
