= Churumatas =

Indigenous group of South America of Arawakan origin

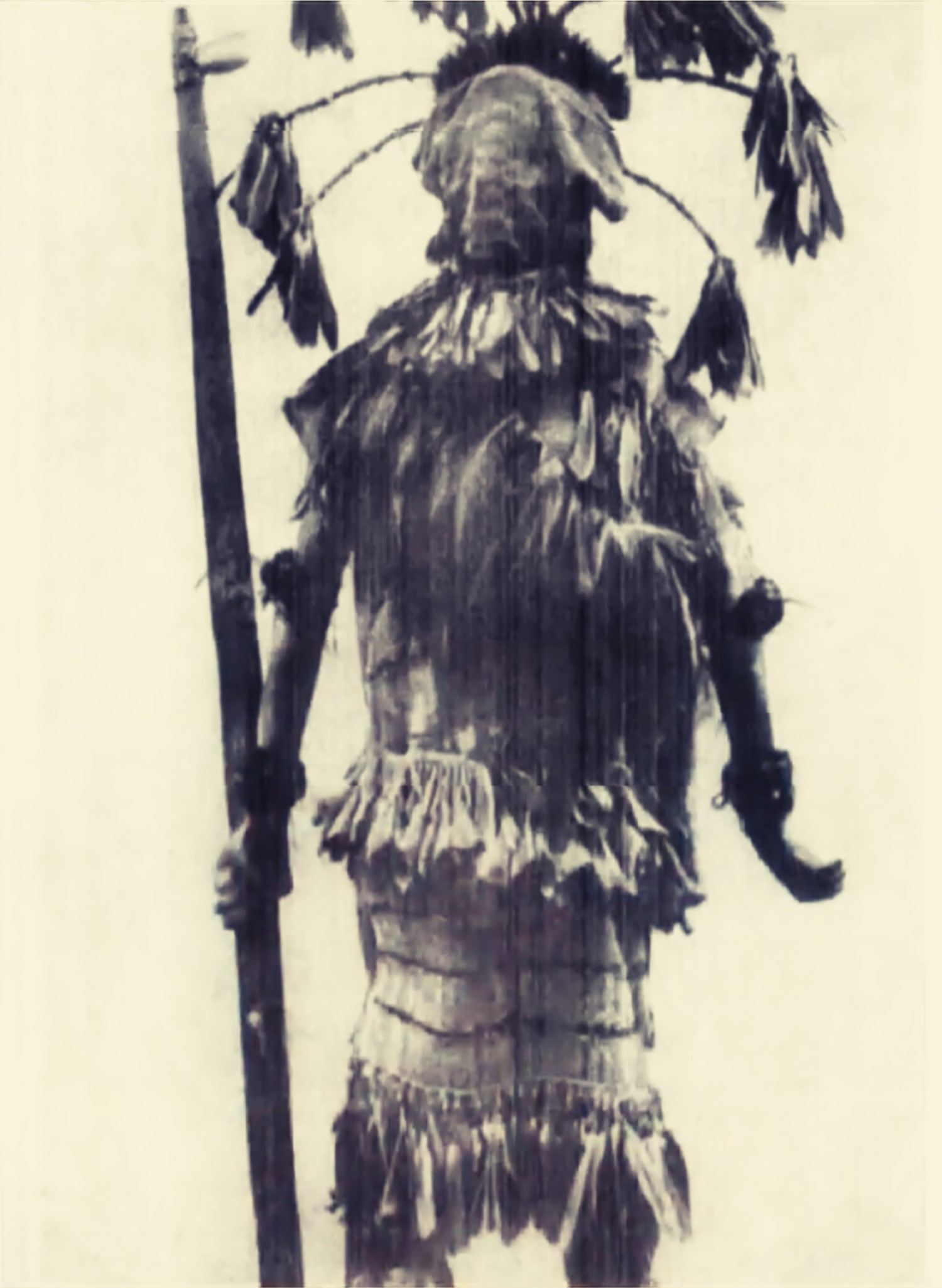
Illustration of a Churumata

The locations were Churumatas are known from colonial-era records. Their possible origin in Tarija is also marked.

The Churumatas were various indigenous populations in present-day Bolivia, Chile and Argentina whose existence was recorded in the early colonial period. In Bolivia Churumatas inhabited mesothermal valleys south of Cochabamba (areas of Tomina, Chuquisaca, Oroncota, Colpavilque, Tarabuco, valle de la Concepción, Santiago del Paso and Tarija). In Chile the Churumatas are reported from Spanish colonial era sources in Elqui Valley. Near Andacollo, which lies about 25 km south of Elqui River, a gold mine had the name of "Churumata" as known from historic documents. In Argentina, the choromatas are listed in sources among the groups inhabiting the Argentine Northwest and in particular Jujuy in 1595 and Tucumán.

In 1596 Churumatas and Moyos Moyos in Colpavilque rebelled against the Spanish.

One view held by historians is that the Churumatas were natives of the valley of Tarija in southern Bolivia but had a diaspora in areas where they, as inferred by Spanish documents, did not own land. Reportedly the Churumatas were dispersed as mitmas aimed to garrison Inca fortresses during the Inca conquest of Qullasuyu in the 1470s during the reign of Tupac Yupanqui. The Tomatas (Copiapóes) are thought to have had a similar history except they were moved the other way round, from their homeland in present-day Chile to the valley of Tarija.

The Churumatas are mentioned in sources as having a homeland immediately southeast of Tarija in the valleys around the rivers of Guadalquivir and Camacho. Possibly they were a partiality of the Chichas.

According to the 2022 census 47 persons identify as Churumata in Argentina while there is no Churumata entry in the prior 2010 census.
