= Tarija =

- City & Municipality
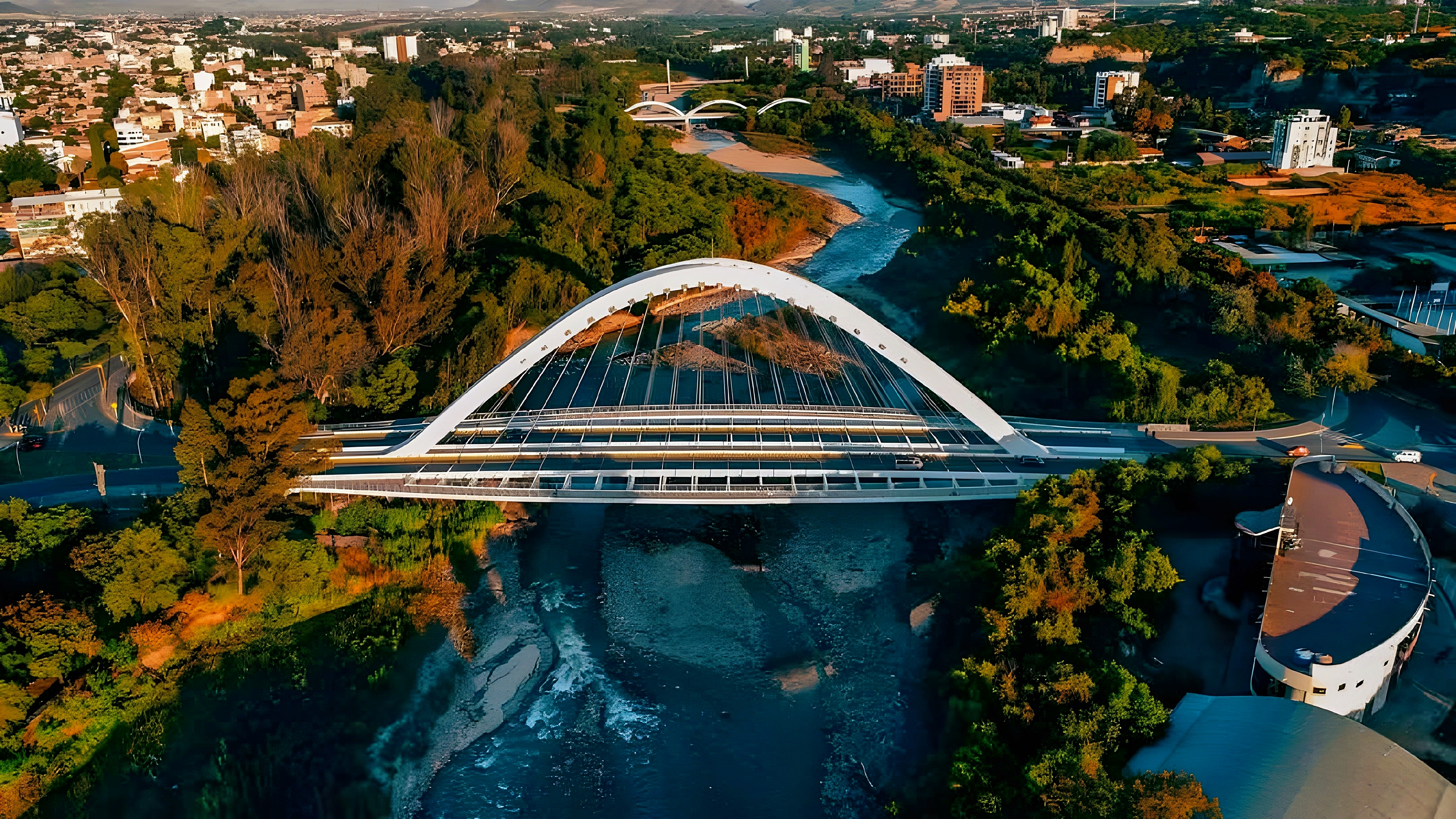
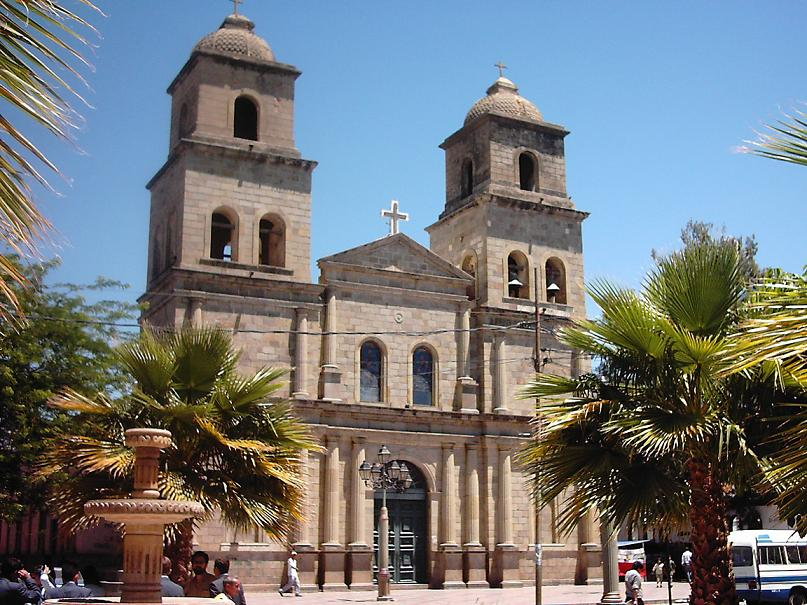
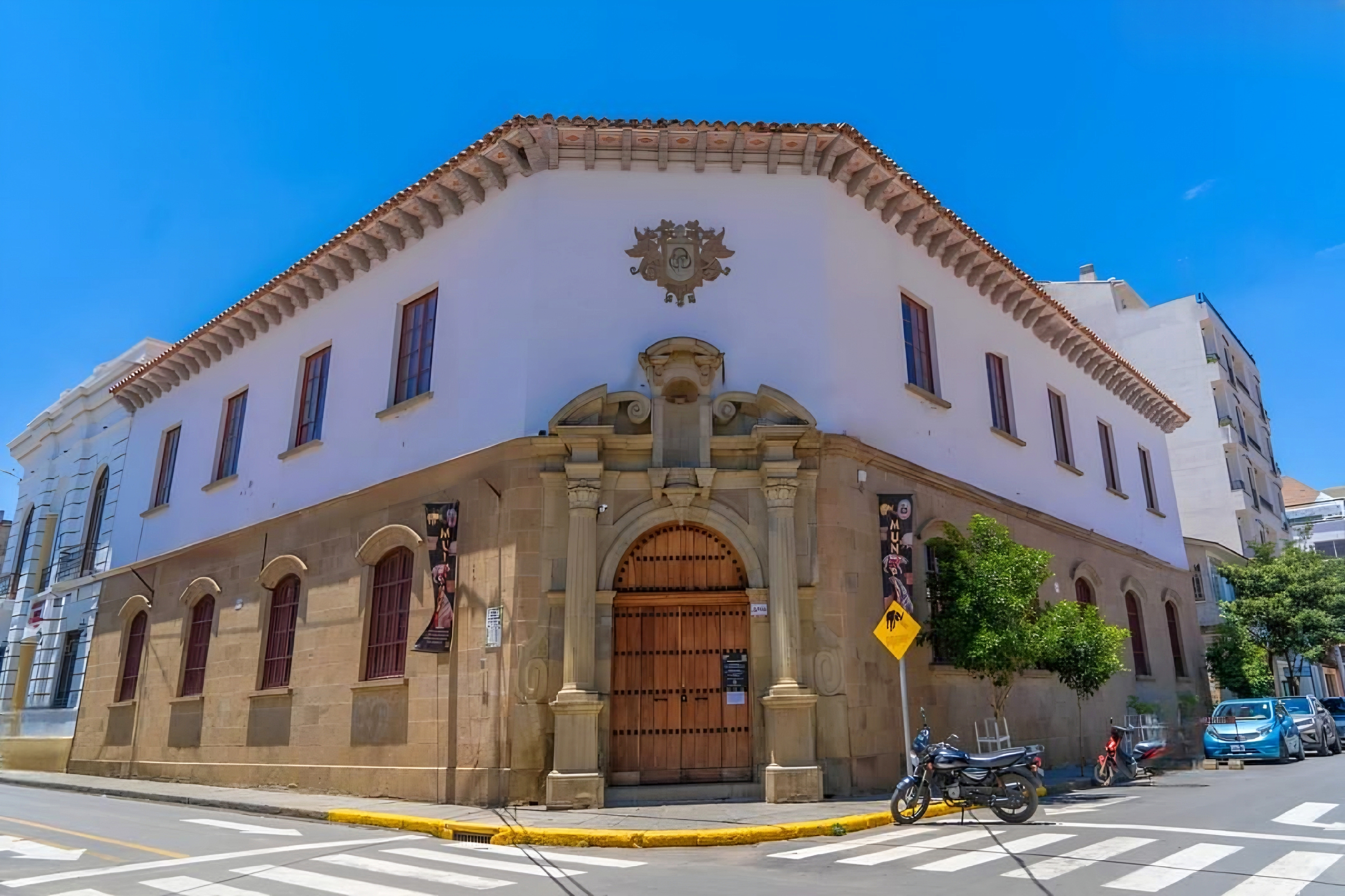
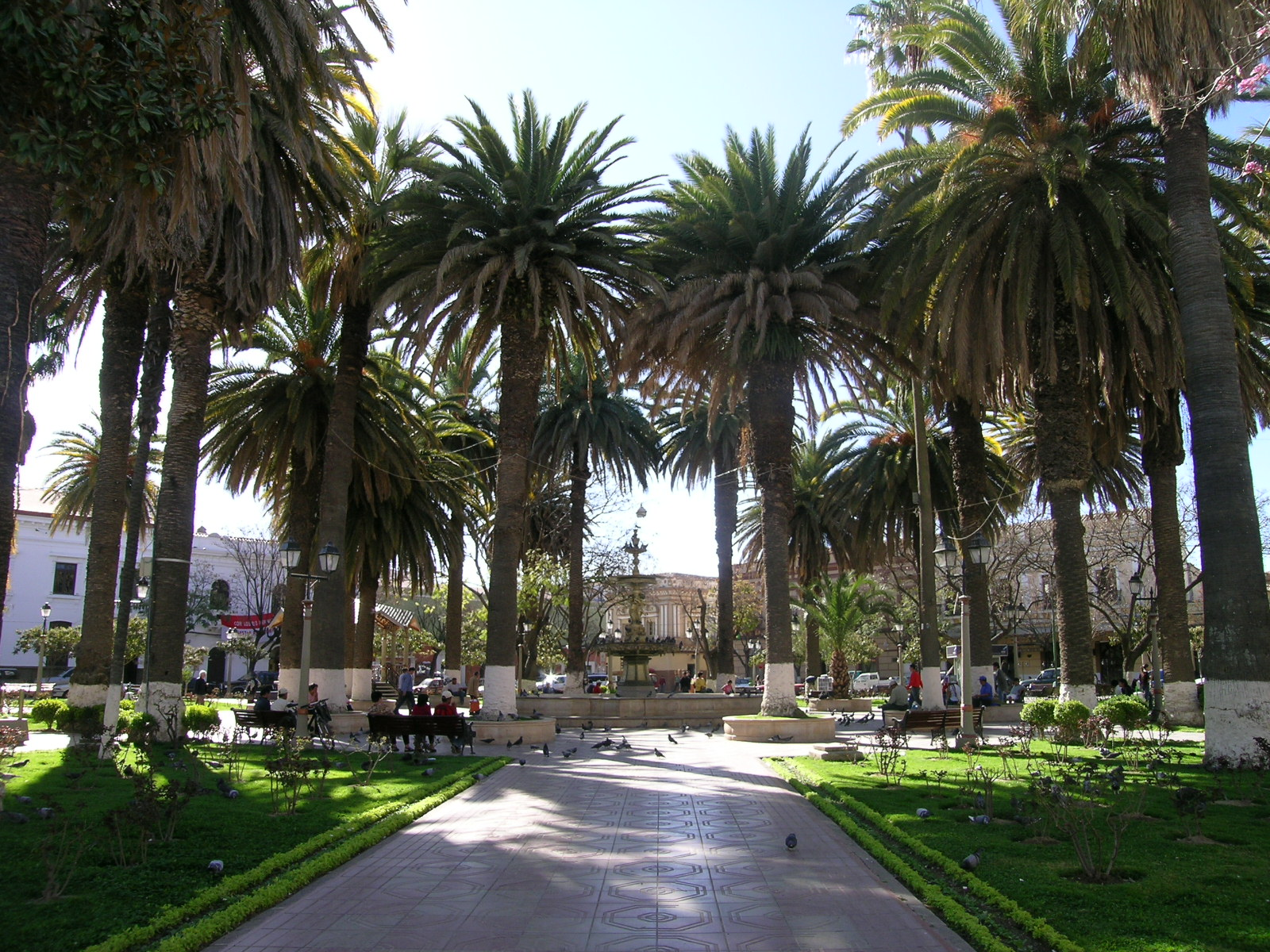
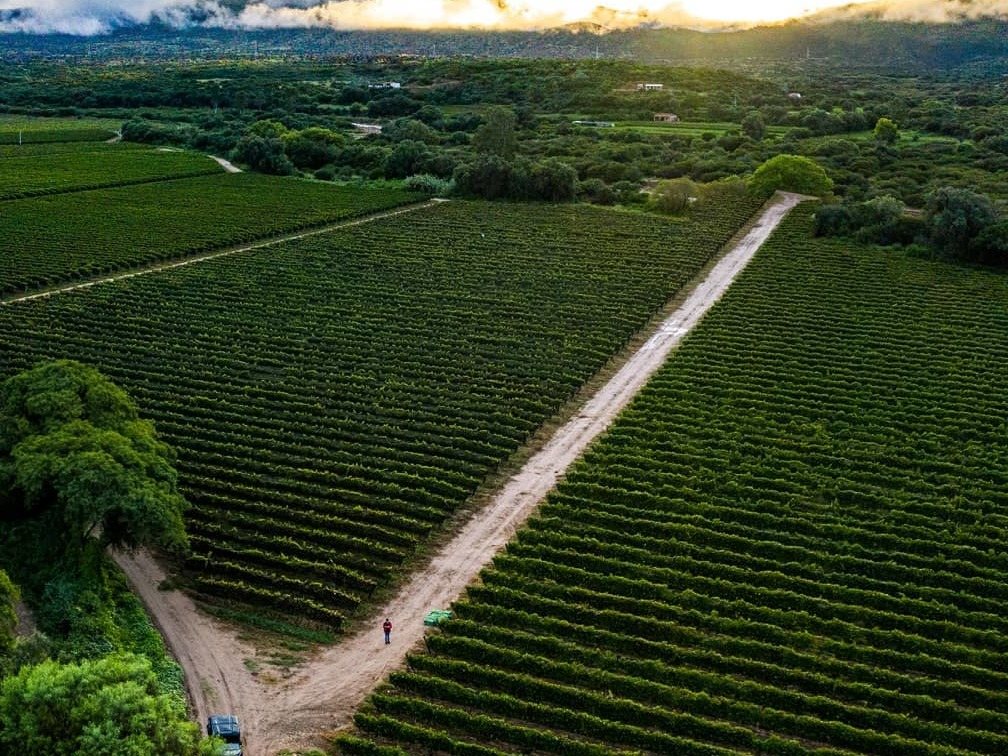
- Aerial view of Tarija Metropolitan Cathedral of Tarija National Museum of Tarija Luis de Fuentes y Vargas Main Square Vineyards in the Tarija Valley

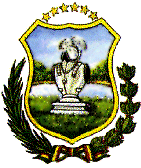
- Coat of arms Flag

- Location in Bolivia Tarija (South America)
- Coordinates: 21°32′S 64°44′W
- Country: Bolivia
- Department: Tarija
- Province: Cercado
- Founded: July 4, 1574

Government
  - Mayor: Johnny Marcell Torres Terzo
- Elevation: 1,854 m (6,083 ft)

Population (2012 Census)
  - Urban: 268,000
  - Metro: 330,000
- Time zone: UTC-4 (BOT)
- Area code: 4
- Website: Official website

Tarija or San Bernardo de la Frontera de Tarixa is a city in southern Bolivia. Founded in 1574, Tarija is the largest city and capital and municipality within the Tarija Department, with an airport offering regular service to primary Bolivian cities, like Bolivia capital La Paz, as well as a regional bus terminal with domestic and international connections. Its climate is semi-arid (BSh) with generally mild temperatures in contrast to the harsh cold of the Altiplano (e.g., La Paz) and the year-round humid heat of the Amazon Basin (e.g., Santa Cruz de la Sierra). Tarija has a population of 234,442 as of 2013.

The cities lies in a depression in the eastern Andes known as the Central Valley of Tarija.

== Toponymy and etymology ==
The name of Tarija is said to come from Francisco de Tarija or Tarifa. This group did not include anyone by the name of Francisco de Tarija. Similar-sounding toponyms exist for surrounding places, such as Tariquia and Taxara.

== History ==
=== Pre-Inca era ===
Traditional history holds that the Tomatas were the indigenous population of the valley of Tarija prior to Spanish conquest, but some documents suggest that early Spanish conquereors encountered Tomatas in the Cinti region of Bolivia, in particular around San Juan del Oro River, and brought them to Tarija.

The prior to Inca rule the valley of Tarija was mainly inhabited by Churumatas and Moyos Moyos.

=== Inca period ===
The Inca Empire – administered by the Quechua civilization – conquered the land and dispersed the Churumatas and other local groups over wide territories of the Andes. Mitimaes is the Quechuan name that the Incas used for the resisting ethnic groups they uprooted and then dispersed geographically. The Tomatas are thought to have been brought to San Juan del Oro River in the vicinities of Tarija from Norte Chico, Chile. The Tomatas appear to have given place names from their old lands to their new area of settlement thus explaining the existence of "Chilean" place names such as Loa, Calama, and Erqui (Elqui) in Bolivia.

In contrast, the native Churumatas were dispersed into what is today Chile and Argentina as mitmas to garrison Inca fortresses during Topa Inca Yupanqui's conquest of Collasuyu in the 1470s.

When the Spanish first arrived to the valley of Tarija they encountered several stone roads, most likely the remnants of pre-Incaic cultures, such as that of the Churumatas. However, during that period, the presence of indigenous peoples remained sparse within the valley. Several of the pre-Incaic roads and trails have been preserved, and currently function as a walking trail for Tarijeños.

=== Spanish arrival ===
The first Spanish expedition to reach Tarija was that of Pedro de Candia who came with 200 men and stayed in the area from September 1539 to February 1540. Other expeditions arrived to the valley of Tarija in 1540 and 1548 and first permanent Spanish settlement was finally established in the 1570s as the city of Tarija. Soon after the Spanish contacts in the late 1530s and 1540s the "Suares" tribe in Tarija Valley fled to Paiquito which appear to have been their homeland. Historical records mention they fled the "Chiriguanae", but an alternative interpretation is that this was a mere excuse to flee an area that was being settled by the Spanish and that they preferred to endure Spanish rule in their homeland than in Tarija. Therefore before the establishment of the Spanish city of Tarija the area was largely depopulated. To resettle the area in 1574 conquistador Luis de Fuentes brought Tomatas from San Juan del Oro River to the area of Tarija.

For long time a frontier existed east of Tarija in southeastern Bolivia. Starting in the late 16th century the Spanish saw the tribes inhabiting the eastern jungles, and the "Chiriguanos" in particular, as a threat.

In colonial times Franciscans planted the first vines in Tarija.

=== Bolivian era ===
In 1826 the citizens of Tarija voted to become part of Bolivia. In 1807, Tarija had become separated from Upper Peru to become part of the jurisdiction of Salta (part of Argentina), but because of its close ties to what became Bolivia, it returned to its original jurisdiction. In 1899, Argentina renounced its claims in exchange for the Puna de Atacama.

== Facilities and tourism ==
Tarija's main plaza is surrounded by restaurants of various cuisines, local handicraft shops, and internet cafes. Within immediate walking distance is the public market, a university campus, and a number of tourist sights including the Paleontology Museum of Tarija City. The city includes higher-end restaurants as well as fast food restaurants and dance clubs.

From Tarija, primary destinations and land routes coincide with the cardinal directions: Paraguay/the Gran Chaco, to the east via Yacuiba; Argentina, to the south via Bermejo, Yacuiba or Villazón; Tupiza/the Salar de Uyuni, to the west via Villazón; and the central cities of Bolivia, to the north via Potosí. The route to the altiplano and Potosí is much safer, as of December 2012. A new tunnel bypasses Sama, the mountain just west of the city of Tarija.

The San Jacinto Dam is located a few kilometers south of Tarija, and the Chorros de Jurina falls is located a few kilometers northwest from the city.

Tarija's land and climate are adequate for grape and wine production. The Festival of Wine is held annually in Tarija.

== Climate ==
Tarija has a semi-arid climate (Köppen BSh/BSk), bordering on a subtropical highland climate (Cwb). The summers are warm and generally humid, while winters are dry, with barely any rainfall, and temperatures warm during the day and cooler at night. Almost all the annual precipitation is received during the southern-hemisphere summer months. Frosts occasionally occur from May to October. On July 25, 2019, the most intense snowfall in Tarija since 1954 was recorded.

Climate data for Tarija Airport, elevation: 1,875 metres (6,152 ft), 1981–2010 normals, extremes 1962–present)
Month	Jan	Feb	Mar	Apr	May	Jun	Jul	Aug	Sep	Oct	Nov	Dec	Year
Record high °C (°F)	36.5 (97.7)	37.4 (99.3)	37.5 (99.5)	37.3 (99.1)	36.9 (98.4)	35.1 (95.2)	36.0 (96.8)	37.4 (99.3)	39.5 (103.1)	39.7 (103.5)	37.8 (100.0)	38.8 (101.8)	39.7 (103.5)
Mean daily maximum °C (°F)	27.1 (80.8)	26.6 (79.9)	26.6 (79.9)	25.9 (78.6)	24.8 (76.6)	24.4 (75.9)	23.9 (75.0)	25.6 (78.1)	26.1 (79.0)	27.5 (81.5)	27.4 (81.3)	27.5 (81.5)	26.1 (79.0)
Daily mean °C (°F)	20.8 (69.4)	20.3 (68.5)	20.2 (68.4)	18.6 (65.5)	15.5 (59.9)	13.6 (56.5)	13.2 (55.8)	15.4 (59.7)	17.0 (62.6)	19.7 (67.5)	20.3 (68.5)	21.0 (69.8)	18.0 (64.4)
Mean daily minimum °C (°F)	14.7 (58.5)	14.1 (57.4)	13.8 (56.8)	11.3 (52.3)	6.3 (43.3)	2.7 (36.9)	2.5 (36.5)	5.2 (41.4)	7.9 (46.2)	11.9 (53.4)	13.3 (55.9)	14.4 (57.9)	9.8 (49.6)
Record low °C (°F)	6.0 (42.8)	4.0 (39.2)	4.8 (40.6)	−2.0 (28.4)	−3.0 (26.6)	−7.7 (18.1)	−9.2 (15.4)	−8.0 (17.6)	−4.2 (24.4)	0.0 (32.0)	3.0 (37.4)	0.0 (32.0)	−9.2 (15.4)
Average precipitation mm (inches)	130.2 (5.13)	100.4 (3.95)	90.3 (3.56)	16.1 (0.63)	1.7 (0.07)	0.2 (0.01)	0.3 (0.01)	1.9 (0.07)	7.0 (0.28)	37.1 (1.46)	73.2 (2.88)	125.9 (4.96)	584.3 (23.00)
Average precipitation days	14.8	12.5	11.2	4.0	1.1	0.3	0.3	0.9	2.6	6.8	10.4	12.8	77.6
Average relative humidity (%)	67.1	68.9	68.6	65.6	58.9	53.0	51.9	50.0	50.8	54.6	59.6	64.1	59.2
Source: Servicio Nacional de Meteorología e Hidrología de Bolivia

Climate data for Tarija
Month	Jan	Feb	Mar	Apr	May	Jun	Jul	Aug	Sep	Oct	Nov	Dec	Year
Mean daily maximum °C (°F)	28.5 (83.3)	27.2 (81.0)	26.3 (79.3)	25.5 (77.9)	24.3 (75.7)	21.6 (70.9)	23.3 (73.9)	24.9 (76.8)	27.2 (81.0)	27.8 (82.0)	27.5 (81.5)	28.8 (83.8)	26.1 (78.9)
Daily mean °C (°F)	21.8 (71.2)	20.7 (69.3)	19.6 (67.3)	17.9 (64.2)	15.4 (59.7)	12.2 (54.0)	12.6 (54.7)	14.5 (58.1)	17.4 (63.3)	19.5 (67.1)	20.0 (68.0)	21.3 (70.3)	17.7 (63.9)
Mean daily minimum °C (°F)	15.0 (59.0)	14.2 (57.6)	12.9 (55.2)	10.4 (50.7)	6.6 (43.9)	2.8 (37.0)	2.0 (35.6)	4.1 (39.4)	7.7 (45.9)	11.3 (52.3)	12.6 (54.7)	13.8 (56.8)	9.5 (49.0)
Average rainfall mm (inches)	125 (4.9)	107 (4.2)	75 (3.0)	24 (0.9)	2 (0.1)	2 (0.1)	0 (0)	3 (0.1)	6 (0.2)	34 (1.3)	65 (2.6)	113 (4.4)	556 (21.8)
Source: Climate-Data.org

== Gallery ==
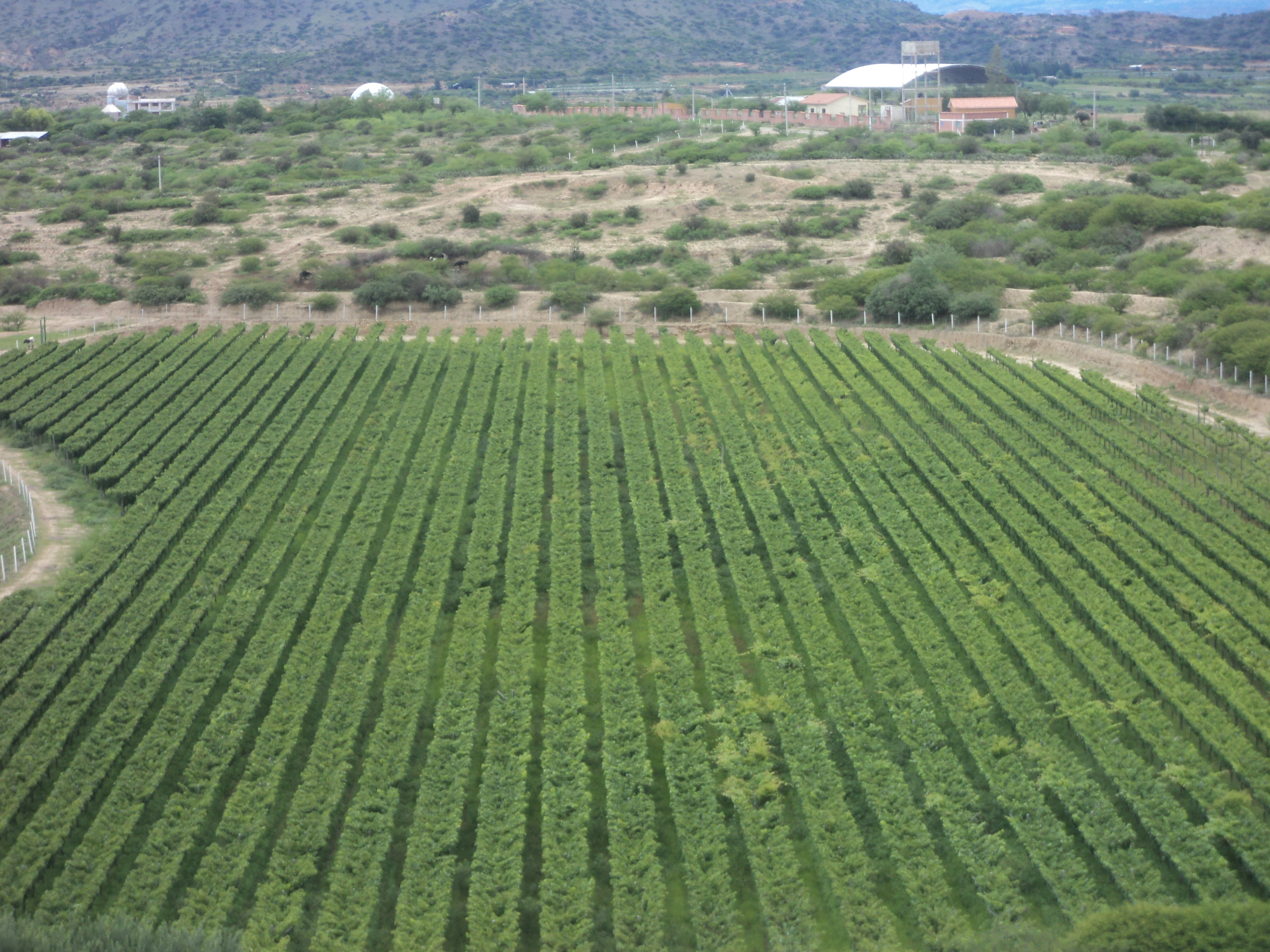
Vineyards in Tarija, Bolivia

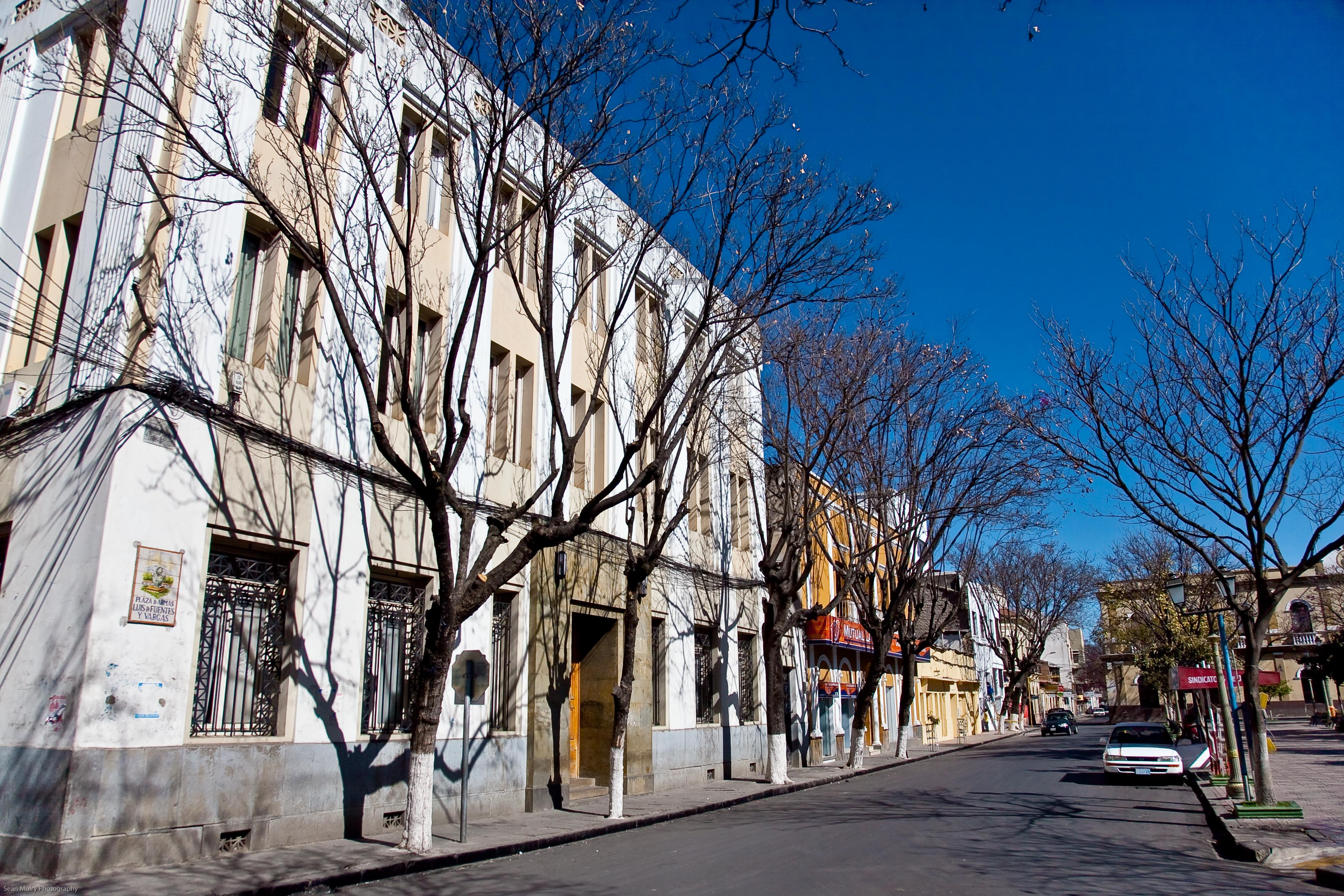
Plaza de Armas, Tarija

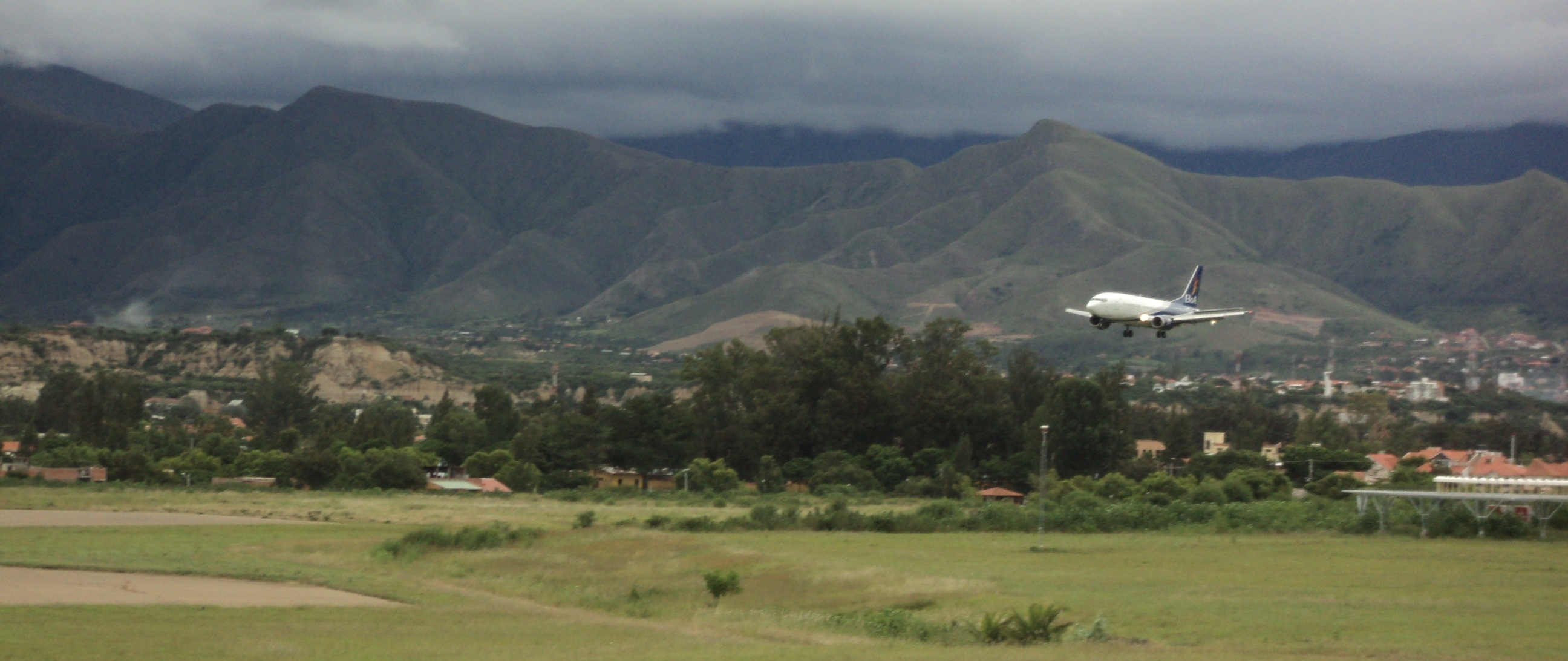
Capitán Oriel Lea Plaza Airport

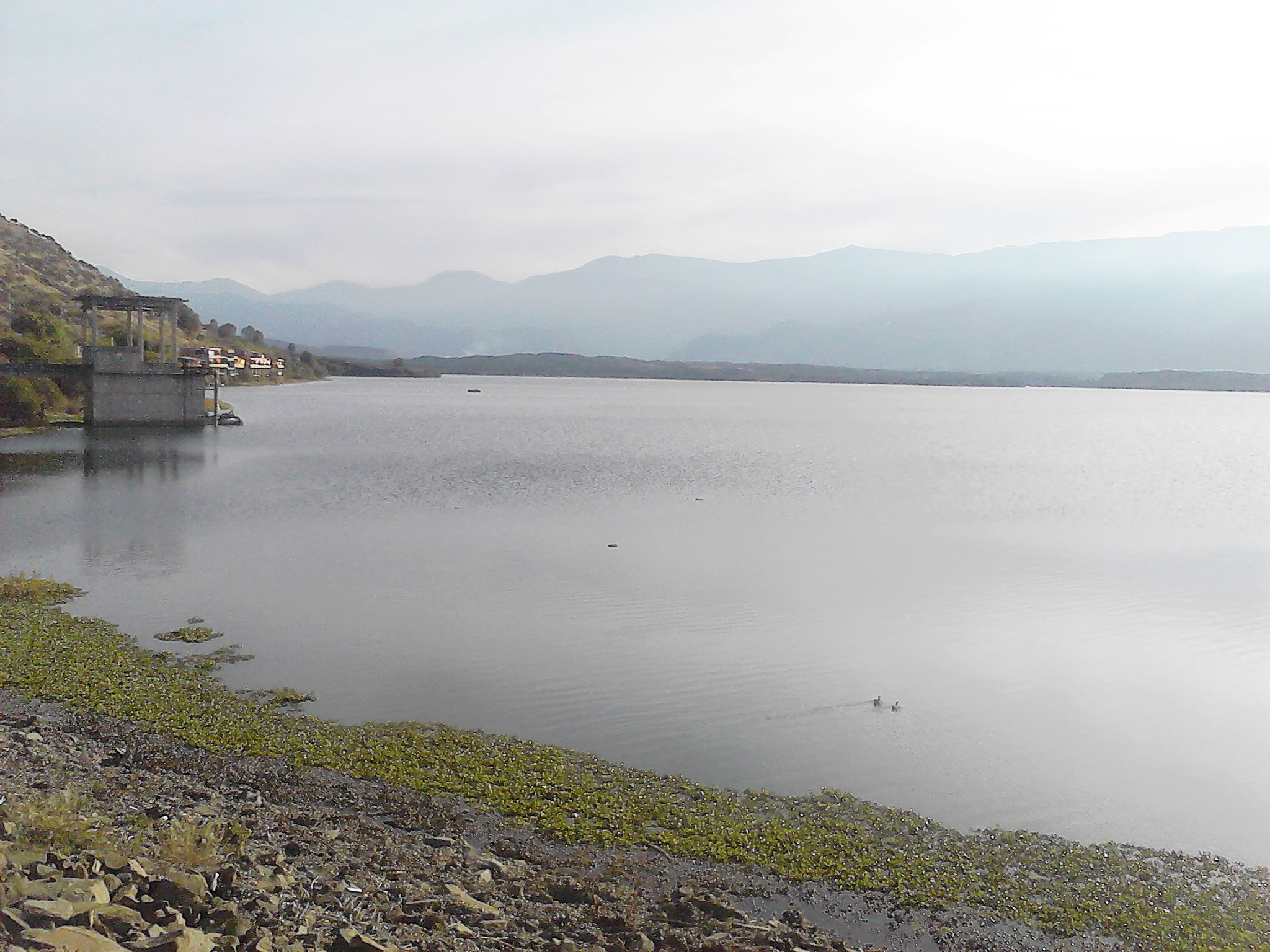
San Jacinto Lake, Tarija

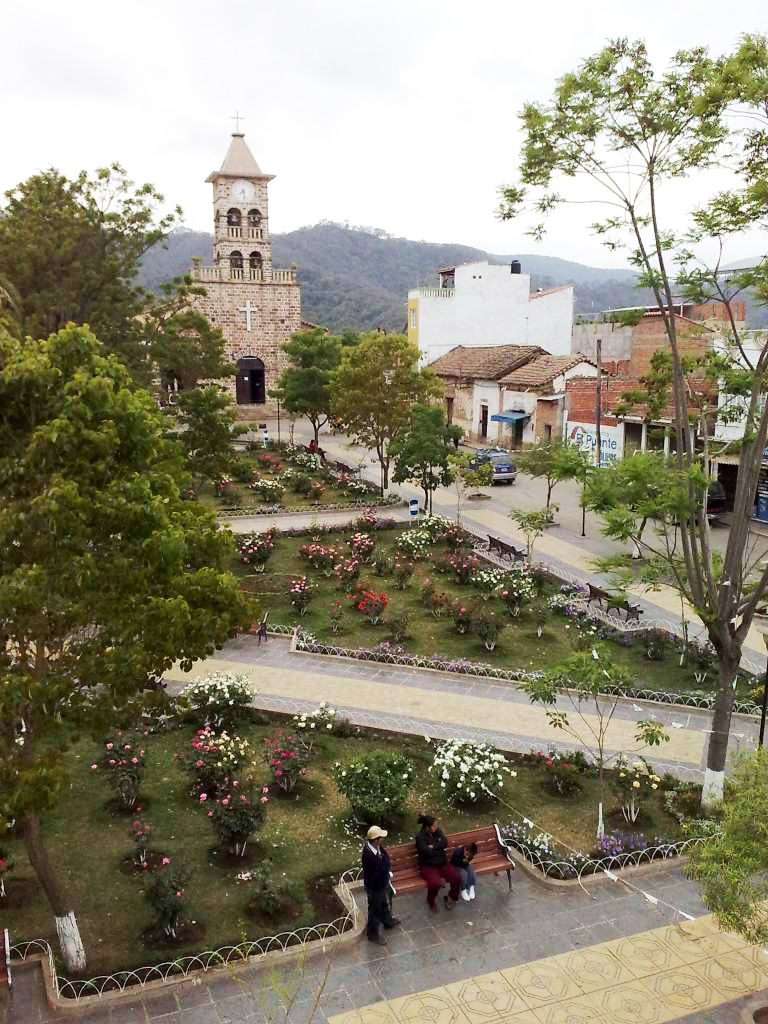
Entre Rios Square, Tarija

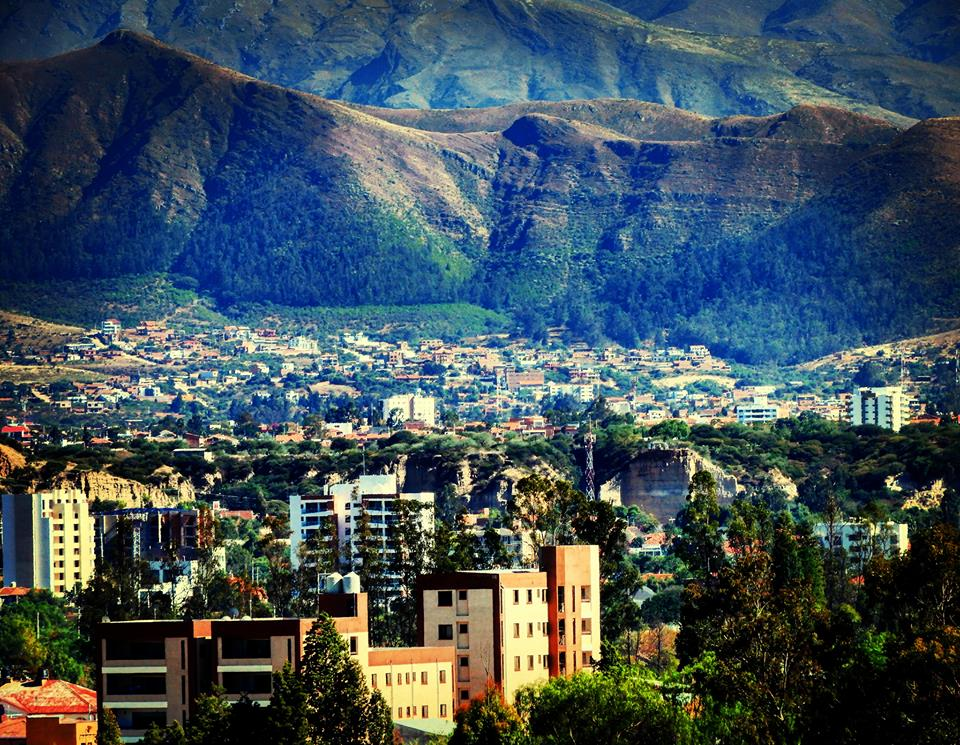
Tarija, Bolivia

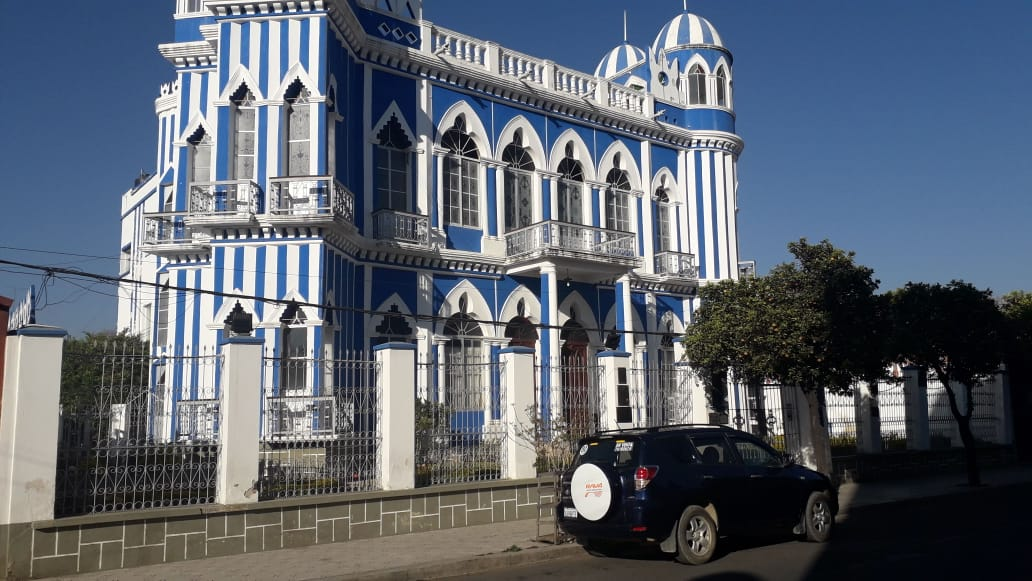
Tarija, Bolivia

== Lifestyle ==
Tarija is commonly regarded by Bolivian nationals and tourists alike as the "Bolivian Andalusia". The Guadalquivir River that borders the city was named after the Spanish river of the same name. Residents of Tarija call themselves Chapacos, regardless of social class and ethnic background. Although the origin of the name is uncertain, there is a hypothesis that it is a variation of chacapa, the name of an indigenous settlement in the region during early colonial times.

During Bolivia's post-revolutionary period, the Chapacos voted in favor of being annexed by Bolivia instead of Argentina. For that reason, Tarijeños have been included among Bolivia's most loyal and patriotic people. However, the modern culture is slightly isolated from the rest of urban Bolivia, and in recent times, many Tarijeñans feel much more connected to Tarija itself than to the rest of Bolivia. Their local creed is reflected in a famous, folkloric Cueca song, titled "Chapaco Soy".

== Sports ==
The city's Guadalquivir Coliseum has hosted games of Bolivia's national basketball team.

== Twin towns – sister cities ==
- Mejillones, Chile
- Brasschaat, Belgium
- Tournai, Belgium
- Iniesta, Spain
- Salta, Argentina
- Villa Carlos Paz, Argentina
- Mendoza, Argentina
- Asunción, Paraguay
- San Bernardino, Paraguay
