= Cueca =

Family of musical styles

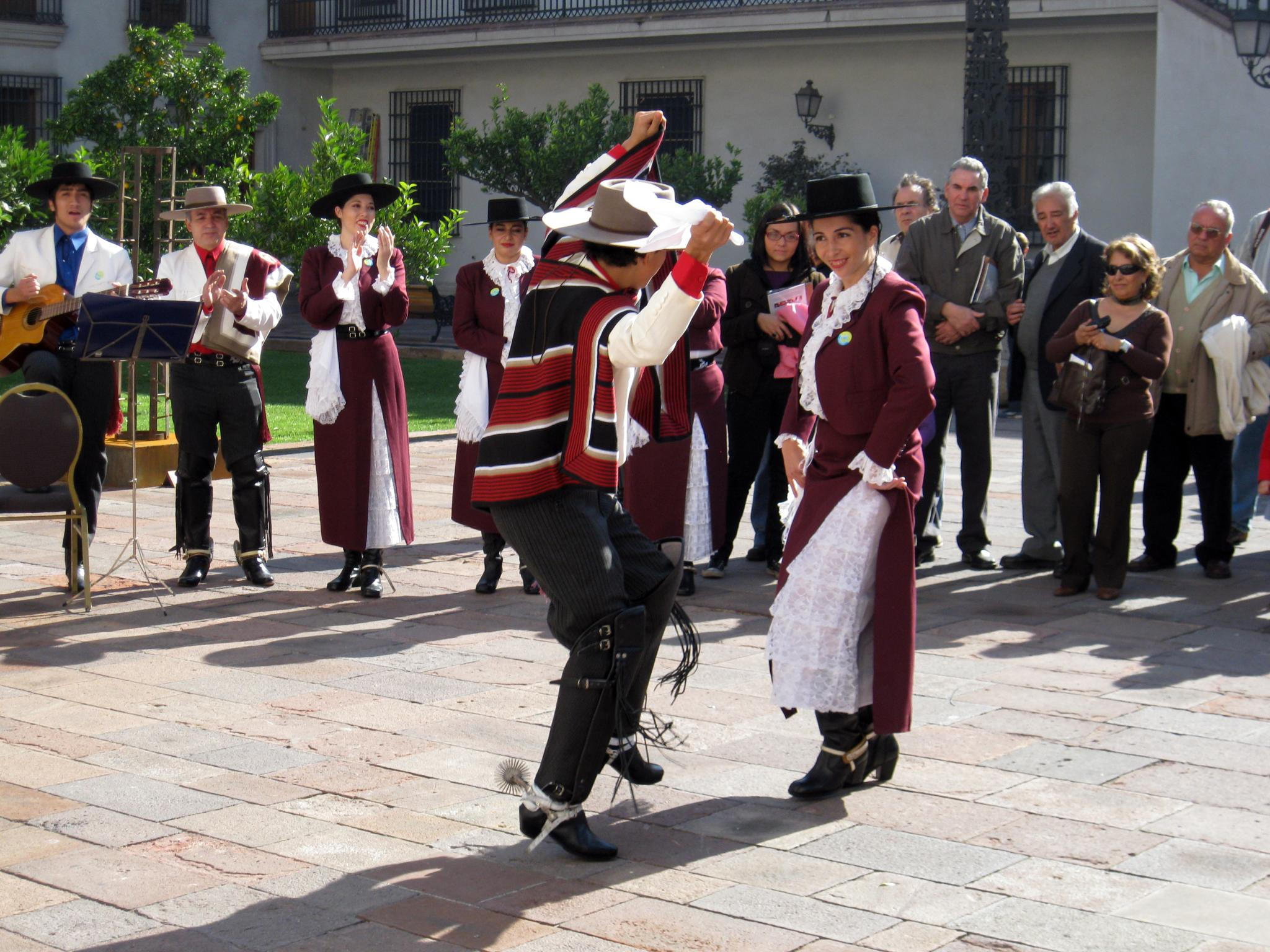
A couple dancing Cueca at Palacio de La Moneda during El Dieciocho

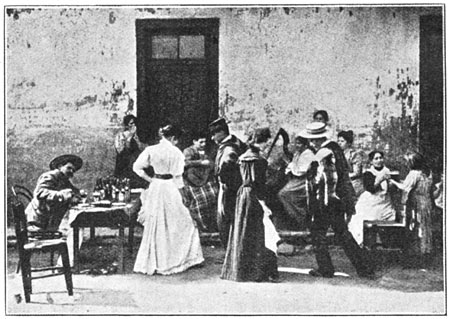
People dancing Cueca in 1906

Cueca (Spanish pronunciation: [ˈkweka]) is a family of musical styles and associated dances in which 'the dancers, who carry a handkerchief in their right hand, trace circular figures, with turns and half-turns, interrupted by various flourishes.' It dates back to the late 18th century, and its origin is disputed; there are various theories or schools of thought regarding its provenance and evolution.

It is danced "under more or less different names", from Colombia to Argentina, Chile, and Bolivia, and it has different varieties, both in rhythm and choreography, depending on the regions and the periods; "the only thing that differentiates them is the local color they acquire in different places, as well as the number of measures, which varies from one to another."

The Chilean government officially declared the cueca the "national dance of Chile" through Decree No. 23 of November 6, 1979, issued by the Ministry of the General Secretariat of Government, and designated September 17 as the "National Cueca Day" through Decree No. 54 of October 28, 1989, issued by the same ministry. Likewise, the Bolivian government declared the Bolivian cueca an intangible cultural heritage of the country on November 30, 2015, and established the first Sunday of October as the "Day of the Bolivian Cueca".

== Origins ==
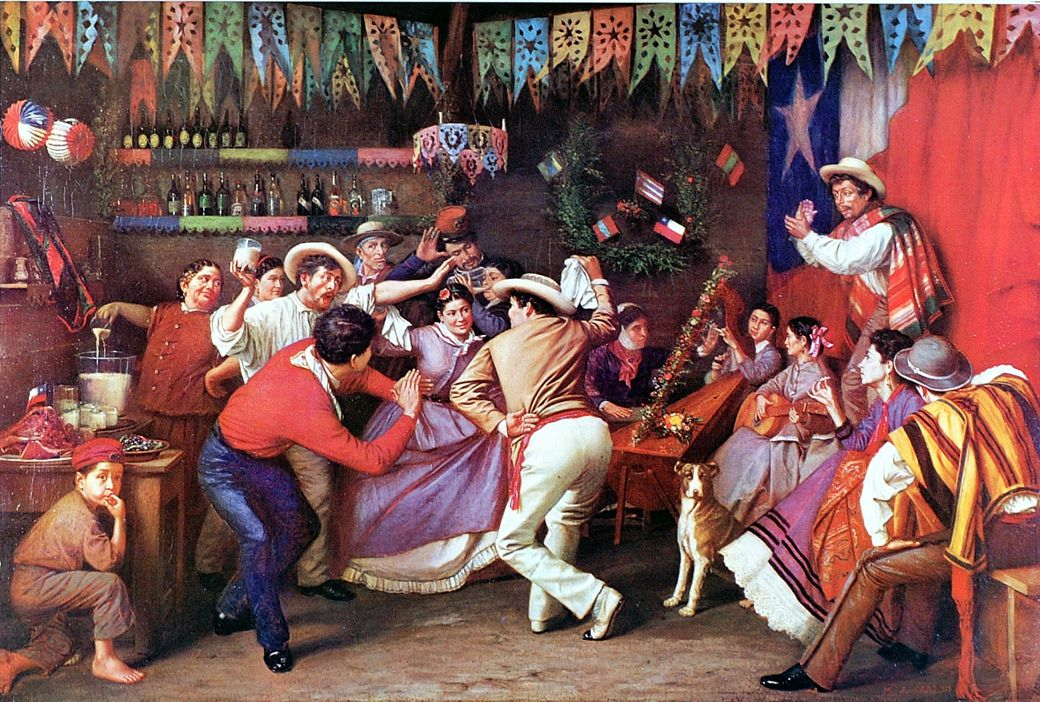
La Zamacueca, by Manuel Antonio Caro

While cueca's origins are not clearly defined, it is considered to have mostly European Spanish and arguably indigenous influences. The most widespread version of its origins relates it with the zamacueca which arose in Peru as a variation of Spanish Fandango dancing with criollo. The dance is then thought to have passed to Chile and Bolivia, where its name was shortened and where it continued to evolve. Due to the dance's popularity in the region, the Peruvian evolution of the zamacueca was nicknamed "la chilena", "the Chilean", due to similarities between the dances. Later, after the Pacific War, the term marinera, in honor of Peru's naval combatants and because of hostile attitude towards Chile, was used in place of "la chilena". In March 1879 the writer and musician Abelardo Gamarra renamed the "chilena" as the "marinera". The Marinera, Zamba and the Cueca styles are distinct from each other and from their root dance, the zamacueca.

Another theory is that Cueca originated in the early nineteenth century bordellos of South America, as a pas de deux facilitating partner finding.

The usual interpretation of this courting dance is zoomorphic: it tries to reenact the courting ritual of a rooster and a hen. The male displays a quite enthusiastic and at times even aggressive attitude while attempting to court the female, who is elusive, defensive and demure. The dance often finishes with the man kneeling on one knee, with the woman placing her foot triumphantly on his raised knee.

In Bolivia, there are many variations throughout the different regions. Cueca styles of La Paz, Potosí and Sucre are the elegant and static versions, whereas in Cochabamba and Tarija the style is much livelier and free. The same could be said with the music where in different regions rhythm and speed slightly differ amongst the regions. While dancing, handkerchiefs are used by both male and female dancers by twirling over the head. It is said the twirling of the handkerchief is a way to lure the woman.

== History in Chile ==
In Chile, the cueca developed and spread in bars and taverns, which were popular centers of entertainment and parties in the nineteenth century. During Fred Warpole's stay in Chile between 1844 and 1848, he described some characteristics of the dance: guitar or harp accompaniment, hand drumming or tambourine for rhythm, high-pitched singing, and a unique strumming pattern where the guitarist strums all the strings, punctuated by a slap on the guitar body.

The Chilean cueca is not just Zamacueca; it is a blend of different dances of the time, with Zamacueca being just one influential aspect. The Chilean cueca is highly structured in terms of dance, lyrics, and music, akin to early European dances from colonial times. While the genre does incorporate some Afro-oriented aspects like Zamacueca, cueca represents a fusion of various genres. To understand its evolution, one should observe the different Spanish, European, and popular dances of the era. The Arab-Andalusian influence is considered the most significant contribution to cueca in all aspects—dancing, singing, and tempo—and is regarded as its primary root.

During the second half of the nineteenth century, cueca spread to various Latin American countries, where the dance became known simply as the "chilena" (Chilean). In Argentina, cueca first appeared in Cuyo, in the central west of the country near the Chilean border, documented as early as around 1840. Unlike the northeast and central west, in Buenos Aires the dance was known as "cueca" rather than "chilena", with documented presence from the 1850s onward. Similarly, in Bolivia, like much of Argentina, the dance was referred to as "chilena". Chilean sailors and adventurers carried cueca to the Mexican coast, specifically in Guerrero and Oaxaca, where the dance was also called "chilena". In Peru, the dance became immensely popular during the 1860s and 1870s and was also known as the "chilena".

=== Twentieth century ===
During the twentieth century, cueca became associated with the common man in Chile, and through them, the dance spread to pre-industrialized urban areas such as La Vega, Estación, and Matadero, which were on the outskirts of Santiago at the time. In the 1970s, cueca and Mexican music enjoyed similar levels of popularity in the Chilean countryside. Due to being distinctly Chilean, cueca was chosen by Pinochet's military dictatorship to be promoted.

Cueca was officially declared the national dance of Chile due to its significant presence throughout the country's history, announced via a public decree in the Official Journal (Diario Oficial) on November 6, 1979. Emilio Ignacio Santana, a cueca specialist, argues that the dictatorship's appropriation and promotion of cueca had negative effects on the genre. According to Santana, the dictatorship's endorsement resulted in the wealthy landlord (huaso) becoming the icon associated with cueca, rather than the rural laborer.

=== Cueca sola ===
Cueca sola is a solo variant of the cueca created in 1978 by Violeta Zúñiga and other members of the Association of Families of the Detained-Disappeared (AFDD) as a non-violent protest against the Pinochet dictatorship. In this form of cueca, a woman (arpillerista) dances alone while holding a photograph of her disappeared loved one.

During the television campaign advertising the "No" option in the 1988 Chilean national plebiscite, a group of women (played by real-life relatives of the disappeared) performed the cueca sola. This powerful display of resistance was later re-enacted by surviving members of the group for the 2012 Academy Award-nominated film No, directed by Pablo Larraín.

The symbolic gesture of cueca sola inspired the 1987 song "They Dance Alone (Cueca Solo)" by Sting.

== Clothing and dance ==
The clothing worn during the cueca dance is traditional Chilean attire. Men typically wear a huaso's hat, shirts, a flannel poncho, riding pants, short jacket, riding boots, and spurs. Women wear flowered dresses.

The cueca dance itself symbolizes a rooster-chicken relationship. The man initiates the dance by approaching the woman and offering his arm. The woman then accompanies him, and together they walk around the room. They eventually face each other, each holding a handkerchief in the air, and begin dancing. Although they do not touch physically, they maintain contact through facial expressions and movements that convey flirtation and courtship.

Throughout the dance, it is customary for the pair to wave a white handkerchief, which is an essential element of the cueca.

== Basic structure ==
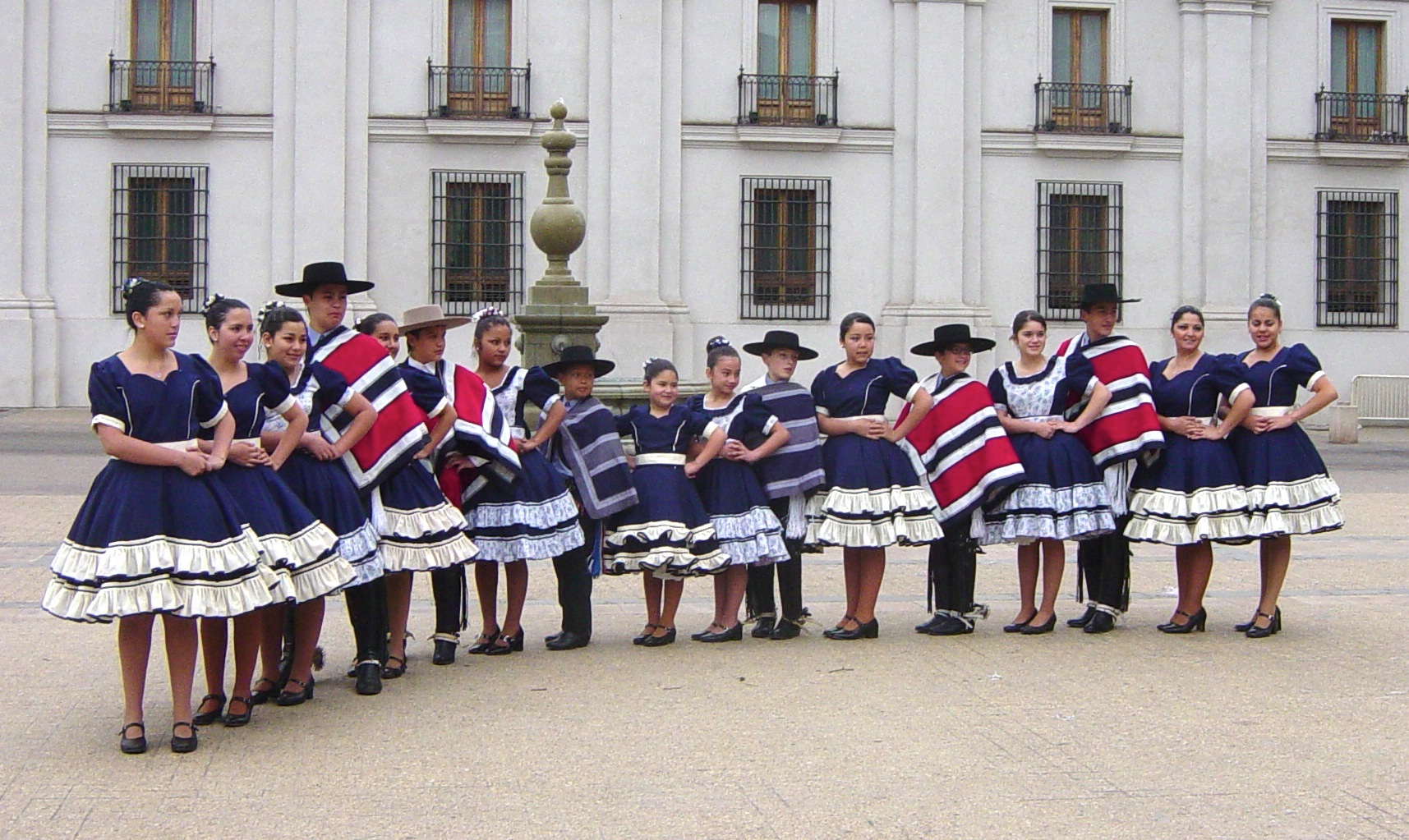
Youth dance group, Santiago

The basic structure of the cueca is that it is a compound meter in 6/8 or 3/4 and is divided into three sections.

Some differences can be noticed depending on geographical location. There are three distinct variants in addition to the traditional cueca:

- The northern cueca: The main difference with this version is that there is no singing in the accompanying music which is played with only sicus, zamponas, and brass. trumpets, tubas. Also, both the music and the dance are slower. This dance is done during religious ceremonies and carnival.
- The cueca from the central region: This genre is mostly seen in Chile. The guitar, accordion, guitarron, and percussion are the prevailing instruments.
- The Chiloé cueca: This form has the absence of the cuarteta. The seguidilla are repeated and there is a greater emphasis on the way the lyrics are presented by the vocalist.

== Interpretation ==
=== Practice ===
Cuequear (meaning 'to perform a cueca') traditionally takes place during the Fiestas Patrias in September, when cueca academies fill up and cuecódromos (cueca dance spaces) are set up for learning. Cuequeo (meaning 'the dancing of one or several cuecas') takes place with live music, mainly at the fondas (festival venues) of O’Higgins Park in downtown Santiago since 2016. It is customary for authorities to inaugurate the September national celebrations with a pie de cueca —each of its three dances—. There are places in the Chilean capital where cueca is danced year-round, chiefly at La Casa de la Cueca since 1983.

Ruedas cuequeras are a way of singing, playing, and composing Chilean cueca. They consist of singers and instrumentalists forming a circle and singing por mano (in turns), that is, dividing the song into copla, first seguidilla, second seguidilla, and remate, with each part assigned to a different singer, passing the singing to the right. First and second voices are performed while the instruments are played.

Esquinazos (tributes to people in public places with Chilean folk music and dances) are common for authorities and foreigners, mainly at the Military Parade since 1969. Cuecadas are simultaneous exhibitions by numerous couples from groups with live music, schools, folk ensembles, or cueca clubs, notably the Saludo Folklórico in Los Ángeles since 2008. Cuecazos are organized in public places on any date, when cueca is danced massively, continuously, and for long periods with live music. Notable examples include Cuecas Mil for more than 36 hours in San Bernardo since 1992—known as the largest “cueca gathering” (relating to cueca or to a person who dances or enjoys it) in Chile—, the Cuecatón during the Teletón in Maipú since 2002, and The Longest Cueca in Chile, stretching more than one kilometer, in Villarrica.

=== Competitions ===
In Chile, national championships of the dance are held annually with one representative couple from each region, selected through regional and municipal championships, mainly:

- National Cueca Championship (Campeonato Nacional de Cueca), since 1968 in Arica, Arica and Parinacota Region;
- National School Cueca Championship (Campeonato Nacional de Cueca Escolar), since 1980 in Mulchén, Biobío Region;
- National Children’s Cueca Championship (Campeonato Nacional de Cueca Infantil), since 1996 in Iquique, Tarapacá Region;
- National Youth Cueca Championship (Campeonato Nacional de Cueca Juvenil), since 1997 in the Magallanes and Chilean Antarctic Region;
- National Senior Citizens’ Cueca Championship (Campeonato Nacional de Cueca del Adulto), since 1999 in Tomé, Biobío Region;
- National Free Expression Cueca Championship (Campeonato Nacional de Cueca Libre Expresión), since 2001 in Rancagua, O’Higgins Region;
- National Championship of Cueca and Folklore Clubs (Campeonato Ncionales de Clubes de Cueca y Folclor), since 2006 in Río Negro, Los Lagos Region;
- National Adolescent Cueca Championship (Campeonato Nacional de Cueca Adolescente), since 2006 in San Clemente, Maule Region; and
- National Inclusive Cueca Championship (Campeonato Nacional de Cueca Inclusiva), since 2019 in Peumo, O’Higgins Region.

Cueca is not only danced throughout Chile, but also by members of Chilean communities abroad, where championships of this dance are likewise held:

- World Championship of Chilean Cueca (Campeonato Mundial de la Cueca Chilena), since 2003 in Toronto, Canada;
- Cofochilex World Cueca Championship (Campeonato Mundial de Cueca Cofochilex), since 2005 in various international cities;
- International Cueca Championship (Campeonato Internacional de Cuecas), since 2014 in Miami, United States.

Likewise, since 1980 the National Competition of Unpublished Cueca Compositions (Concurso Nacional de Composiciones Inéditas de Cueca) has been held annually in Santa Cruz, and since 1986 the National Festival of Unpublished Cueca and Tonada (Festival Nacional de Cueca y Tonada Inédita) in Valparaíso. In 1994, the Exhibition of National Cueca Champions (Muestra de Campeones Nacionales de Cueca) was established in Los Ángeles, and in 2004, the National Exhibition of Cueca Bearers (cultores) in Olmué.

In 2009, “Doscientas primaveras,” composed by Ricardo de la Fuente, was selected as the Bicentennial Cueca.

== In other countries ==
Throughout the 19th century, this dance spread successfully across various Hispanic American countries simply under the name chilena.

=== In Mexico ===
In 1822, through sailors of the Chilean squadron sent by General Bernardo O’Higgins to support the insurgents in the Mexican War of Independence, and later between 1848 and 1855 with Chilean immigrants and adventurers during the California Gold Rush, cueca arrived at the ports of Acapulco (Guerrero), Huatulco, and Puerto Ángel (Oaxaca). There it blended with the mestizo traditions of the southern coastal region (región suriana) and in Mexico gave rise to a new musical genre known as chilena.

This musical genre emerged specifically in what is now the state of Guerrero and very quickly spread throughout the area known as the Costa Chica, which includes the states of Guerrero and Oaxaca. In other states of the Mexican Republic and in the United States, chilena came to be adopted as an additional musical genre due to the mass migrations of people from coastal regions during the 1980s and 1990s.

=== In Peru ===
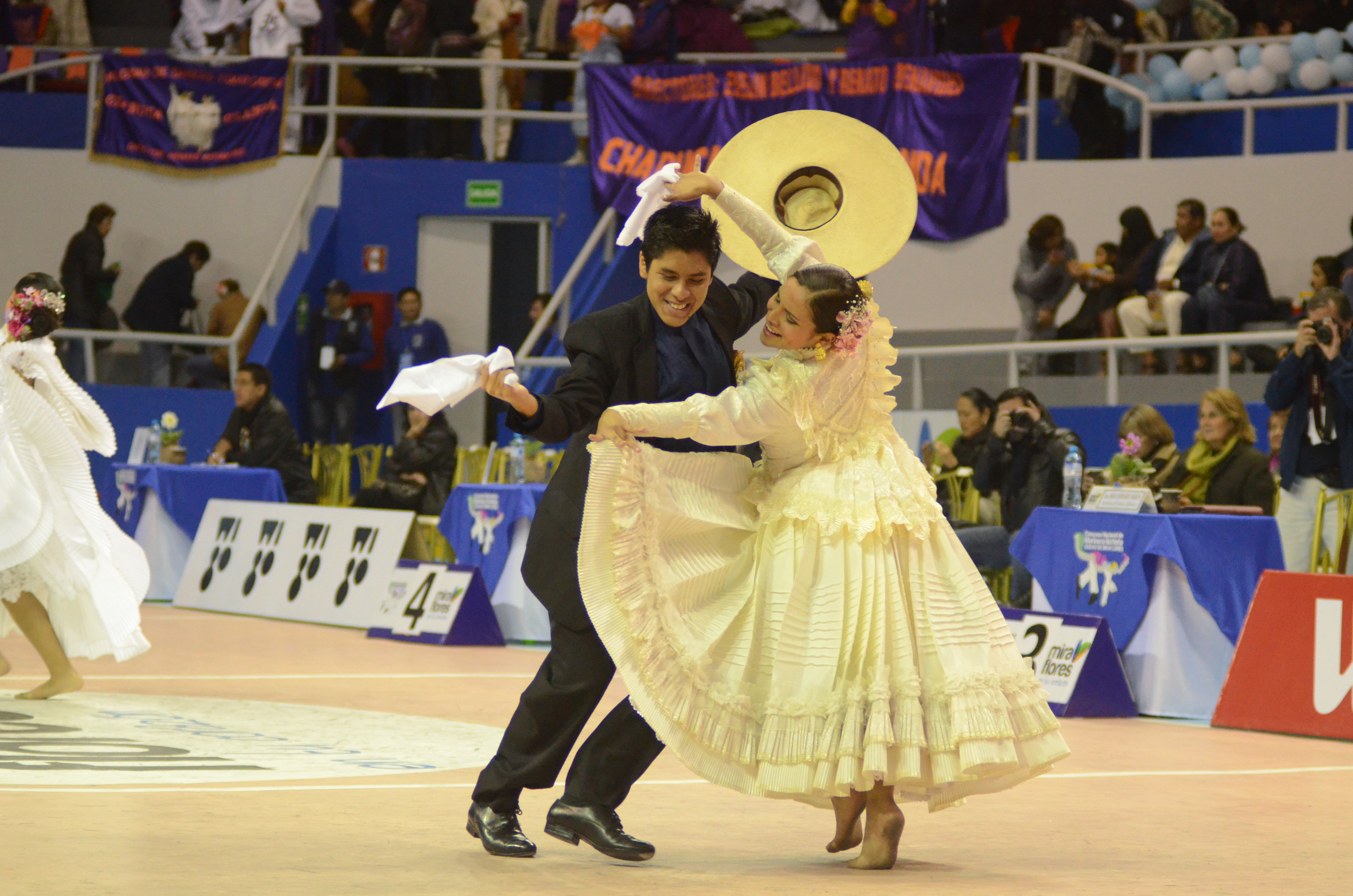
A couple dancing marinera in a competition in Miraflores, Lima, Peru

Toward the end of the War against the Peru–Bolivian Confederation (1836–1839), along with Chilean troops of the United Restoration Army, the “Chilean zamacueca” arrived in Peru. There it became the most popular form during the 1860s and 1870s and came to be known as chilena. In March 1879, the dance called chilena was renamed marinera by the Peruvian writer and musician Abelardo Gamarra, known as El Tunante.

The first marineras were published in the newspaper El Nacional in March 1879: on the 8th, “La Antofagasta”, a Bolivian port occupied by Chile at the time—written by El Tunante with music by Nicanor Núñez del Prado; and on the 15th, “Ciruelas de Chile,” written and set to music by José Alvarado, known as Alvaradito.

Some sources state that marinera “comes from the Aragonese jota, the zamacueca, and the chilena; it breaks away from its former name (chilena) as a consequence of the war with Chile and adopts a nationalist connotation, becoming a version of Peruvian music with its own distinct identity”.

=== In Argentina ===
Cueca entered Argentina from Chile through the Cuyo region—first as zamacueca and later as cueca chilena (Chilean cueca)—where it retained the name cueca. Its presence is documented in the Cuyo region around 1840 and in the province of Buenos Aires in 1850.

The Cuyan cueca (cueca cuyana) is essentially sung, accompanied by guitar—historically, the harp was also used—and can reach a length of 40 or 48 measures. It presents musical and choreographic differences from the current “Chilean cueca”; musically, it retains the bimodality of the old zamacueca, but in a minor mode.

There is also the “northern cueca” (cueca norteña), or simply chilena as it is known by inhabitants of northwestern Argentine provinces and Bolivia. This variant entered the province of Jujuy via Bolivia, directly from Peru—where, until March 1879, it was more commonly called chilena, and after that became known as marinera. In the last quarter of the 19th century, it reached the provinces of Salta and Tucumán. Since 1974, the National Cueca and Damasco Festival (Festival Nacional de la Cueca y el Damasco) has been held annually in Santa Rosa. Among the subgenres of this variant are:

- Cuyan cueca (cueca cuyana)
- Malargüina cueca (cueca malargüina)
- Neuquina cueca (cueca neuquina)
- Northern cueca (cueca norteña, called chilena in the Argentine Northwest)
- Riojana cueca (cueca riojana)
- Cuequita

Among the ten most famous Cuyan cuecas are:

- “Cochero ’e plaza” (Hilario Cuadros)
- “La del Parral” (Hilario Cuadros and Benjamín Miranda)
- “La juguetona” (Buenaventura Luna)
- “La yerba mora” (Hilario Cuadros)
- “Las dos puntas” (Osvaldo Vicente Rocha and Carlos Montbrun Ocampo, 1946)
- “Las tres donosas” (Hilario Cuadros)
- “Los sesenta granaderos” (Hilario Cuadros and Félix Pérez Cardozo)
- “Póngale por las hileras” (Félix Dardo Palorma)
- “¿Por qué será?” (Hernán Videla Flores and Carlos Montbrun Ocampo)
- “Vinito patero” (Coletti and Alberto Rodríguez)

=== In Bolivia ===
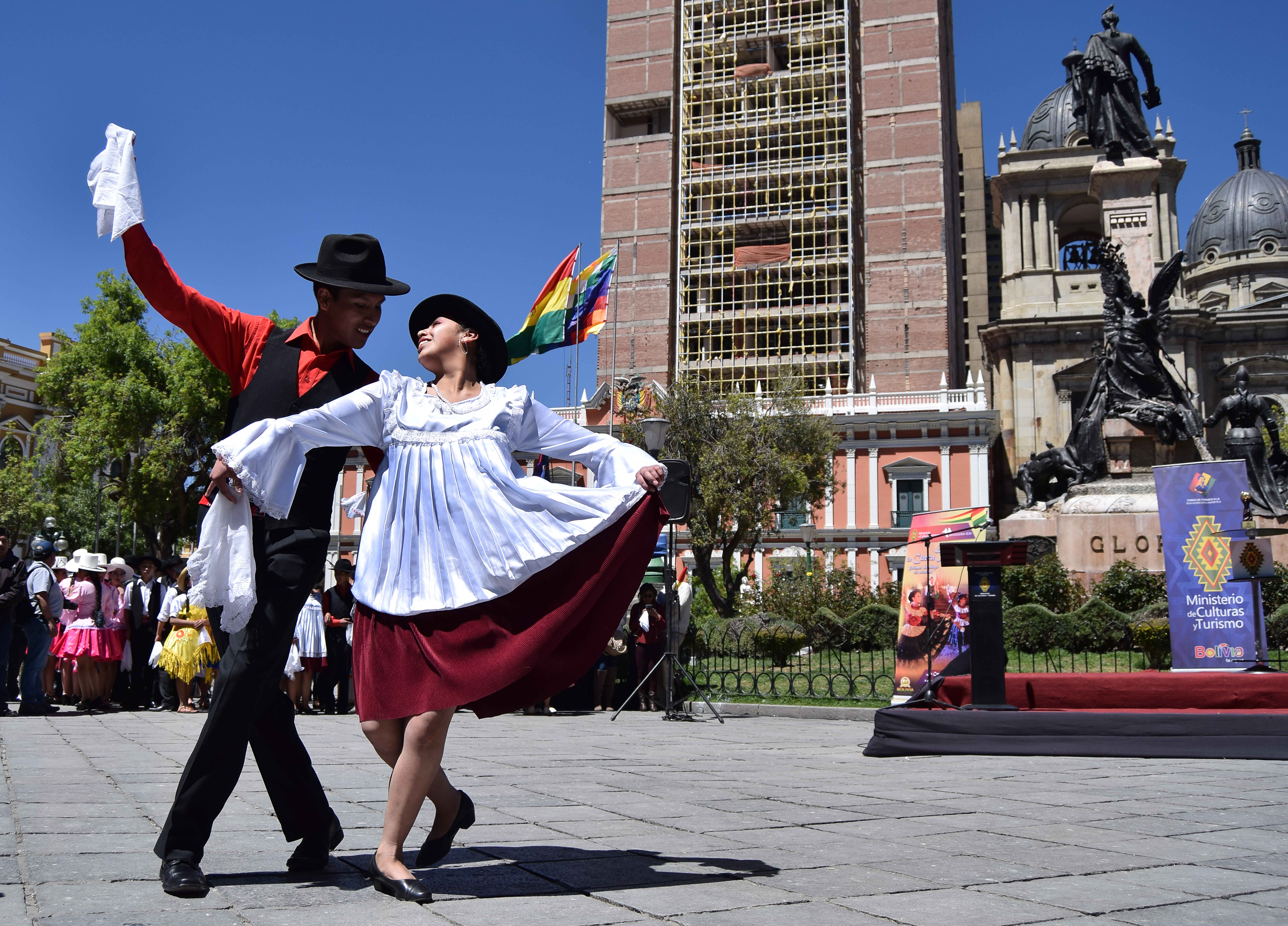
A couple dancing cueca during the celebration of Cueca Day in Plaza Murillo, La Paz, Bolivia

In 1865, cueca entered Bolivia from Peru. In that country, the “Chilean zamacueca” became the most popular form during the 1860s and 1870s and came to be known as the “chilena”. In March 1879, the dance called “chilena” was renamed “marinera” by the Peruvian writer and musician Abelardo Gamarra, known as El Tunante. In general, it can be stated that in Bolivian cueca is a dance performed at social events, especially family gatherings, as well as at patron saint celebrations such as the Oruro Carnival, the Urkupiña festival, and the Gran Poder festival.

Since 2004, the International Cueca Festival has been held annually in El Alto. In 2016, the Bolivian Cueca Cultural Foundation – Willy Claure was created, with the objective of carrying out actions that promote its development, revaluation, safeguarding, promotion, and dissemination. Since 2017, the Cuecoteca has been frequently organized at the Municipal House of Culture in Sucre, and since 2018 in La Paz’s Plaza 25 de Mayo, for learning and practice with live music.

On November 30, 2015, the Bolivian government declared Bolivian cueca to be the country’s “cultural and intangible heritage” through Law 764, stating that “cueca is the principal rhythm that has succeeded in articulating the spirit of a homeland and a nation”. Likewise, the first Sunday of October was declared “Bolivian Cueca Day.” This initiative was promoted by national artists, folkloric dance academies, and the general public.

The Plurinational Legislative Assembly decrees:

Article 1. Se declara Patrimonio Cultural Inmaterial del Estado Plurinacional de Bolivia, a la Cueca Boliviana, por la diversidad de sus expresiones musicales, poéticas, coreográficas y de indumentaria, para la salvaguarda de los valores culturales, tradicionales y populares, que le otorgan identidad nacional.

(Bolivian Cueca is declared Intangible Cultural Heritage of the Plurinational State of Bolivia, due to the diversity of its musical, poetic, choreographic, and costume expressions, in order to safeguard the cultural, traditional, and popular values that grant it national identity.)

Article 2. Se declara “Día Nacional de la Cueca Boliviana”, el primer domingo de octubre de cada año.

(The first Sunday of October of each year is declared “National Day of Bolivian Cueca.”)

Among the subgenres of this variant are:

- Chapaca cueca (cueca chapaca) is coquettish, more or less fast, with zapateo (footwork), and is characterized by elegance and gallantry.
- Chaqueña cueca is bouncy and fast; the clothing is from the Chaco region and it is danced with a more upright posture, especially by women.
- Chuquisaqueña cueca has a “waltz-like” character; the arrangement in rows of ladies and gentlemen, the strict timing, the proud gaze, formal attire and high heels, the pleated skirt below the knees, the embroidered blouse adorned with ruffles, the silk mantilla, and the white handkerchief are some of the details that make up the oldest and best-preserved expression to this day of the colonial ballroom dances of the old city of La Plata, today the city of Sucre.
- Cochabambina cueca has more popular and simple yet cheerful characteristics; it is danced at social, patronal, and chichería events.
- Oruro and La Paz cuecas are similar in structure: both have melancholic minor modes and are danced at various social events, festivities, and occasions such as prestes and others.
- Potosina cueca combines sad and joyful parts and is danced very elegantly, although with attire different from the Chuquisaqueña; for example, the pleated skirt is longer and high heels are not used.

Depending on the type of cueca performed, the costume varies: women wear the dress of the Bolivian chola from Oruro, La Paz, or Potosí, while Chuquisaqueña and Cochabambina women wear a relatively long pleated skirt and ankle boots. In the south, the Chapaca woman wears a shorter skirt, while the Chaqueña uses a long, flowered skirt. Men wear trousers, a shirt, a vest, and a hat. Cueca in Tupiza (Sud Chichas) is also cheerful and bouncy; women wear a short skirt and a wide-brimmed white hat, while men wear trousers, a shirt, a red poncho, and a wide-brimmed white hat.

Among the ten most popular and renowned Bolivian cuecas are:

- “Así es Tarija” (Huáscar Aparicio)
- “Cómo extraño a mi tierra” (Ernesto Mealla)
- “El regreso” (Matilde Casazola)
- “Huérfana Virginia” (Simeón Roncal)
- “La bolivianita” (Huáscar Aparicio)
- “La de Moto Méndez” (Chapaca cueca, Nilo Soruco; sung by Tamara Castro)
- “La tarijeñita” (Rigoberto Rojas Suárez; sung by Los Fronterizos)
- “Morir cantando” (Chapaca cueca, Hugo Monzón)
- “Rojo, amarillo y verde” (Chaqueña cueca, Juan Enrique Jurado)
- “Viva mi patria Bolivia” (originally “A Bolivia,” by Apolinar Camacho and Ricardo Cabrera; recognized as the second national anthem).

== See also ==
- Chinchinero

== Bibliography ==
- Salas, Samuel J. A.; Pauletto, Pedro I.; Salas, Pedro J. S. (1938). Historia de la Música (in Spanish). Vol. 2: América Latina. Buenos Aires: Editorial José Joaquín de Araujo.
- Vicuña Mackenna, Benjamín (1 August 1882). "La zamacueca y la zanguaraña (Juicio crítico sobre esta cuestión internacional)". El Mercurio de Valparaíso. Vol. LV, no. 16630. pp. 2, c. 6-7.
- Tompkins, William David (1998). "Afro-Peruvian Traditions". In Sheehy, Daniel E.; Olsen, Dale A. (eds.). The Garland Encyclopedia of World Music. Vol. 2: South America, Mexico, Central America, and the Caribbean (1st ed.). Routledge. "Probably the most important new national musical genre of the nineteenth century was the zamacueca (or zambacueca), which appeared in coastal Peru not long after 1800. Its choreographic theme, shared with dances derived from it, was a courtship pantomime performed by a man and a woman amid a crowd that accompanied them with rhythmic clapping and supportive shouting. As the dancers advanced and retreated from each other, they rhythmically and provocatively flipped a handkerchief about. The instrumentation varied, but frequently consisted of plucked stringed instruments and a percussive instrument such as the cajon. [...] The zamacueca became popular in many Latin American countries during the mid-1800s, and numerous regional and national variations developed. In the 1860s and 1870s, the zamacueca chilena, a Chilean version of it, was the most popular form in Peru."
- León, Javier F. (2014). "Marinera". In Horn, David; Shepherd, John (eds.). Bloomsbury Encyclopedia of Popular Music of the World. Vol. 9: Genres: Caribbean and Latin America (1st ed.). Bloomsbury Publishing. "By the 1860s, a Chilean variant [of the zamacueca] known as the chilena or cueca was the most prevalent type of zamacueca in Peru. After the War of the Pacific (1879-83) and the Chilean occupation of the city of Lima, the name of the dance was changed to marinera in honor of the Peruvian navy and it was declared the national dance of Peru."
- Ochoa Campos, Moisés (1987). La chilena guerrerense. Ediciones del Gobierno del Estado. p. 140.
- Starr, Kevin (2000). Orsi, Richard J. (ed.). Rooted in barbarous soil: people, culture, and community in Gold Rush California. Berkeley, Los Angeles: University of California Press. ISBN 0-520-22496-5.
- Brands, H. W. (2003). The age of gold: the California Gold Rush and the new American dream. New York: Anchor. ISBN 0-385-72088-2.
- Vega, Carlos (1986). "La zamacueca (cueca, zamba, chilena, marinera)". Las Danzas Populares Argentinas (in Spanish). 2. Buenos Aires: Instituto Nacional de Musicología 'Carlos Vega'. ISBN 978-950-9726-03-1.
