= Huáscar (disambiguation) =

Huáscar was Sapa Inca of the Inca Empire from 1527 to 1532. Huáscar may refer to:

- Huáscar (given name), people named Huáscar
- Huáscar (ironclad), ship
- Raids of Huáscar, series of raids by the Peruvian ironclad Huáscar
