= Tarabuco Municipality =

Tarabuco Municipality Tarapuku munisipyu Municipio de Tarabuco
- Municipality
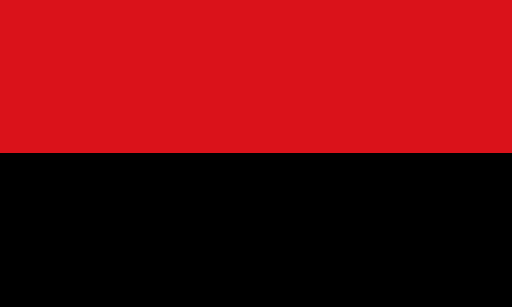
- Flag

- Location of the Tarabuco Municipality within Bolivia
- Coordinates: 19°10′S 64°55′W
- Country: Bolivia
- Department: Chuquisaca Department
- Province: Yamparáez Province
- Incorporated (municipality): 18 November 1912
- Seat: Tarabuco

Government
  - Mayor: election on April 4, 2010

Area
  - Total: 397 sq mi (1,029 km^{2})
- Elevation: 11,500 ft (3,500 m)

Population (2024)
  - Total: 13,323
  - Density: 33.5/sq mi (12.95/km^{2})
  - Ethnicities: Quechua Aymara Guaraní other indigenous
- Time zone: UTC-4 (BOT)
- INE: 010601

Tarabuco Municipality is the first municipal section of the Yamparáez Province in the Chuquisaca Department, Bolivia. Its seat is Tarabuco and its population is overwhelmingly indigenous and rural. On 6 December 2009, the residents voted in favor of indigenous autonomy for the municipality, with a vote of 90.8%.

== Demographics ==
According to the 2024 Bolivian census conducted by the National Institute of Statistics of Bolivia, the Tarabuco Municipality had a population of 13,323 people. The municipality has experienced a consistent population decline over two decades, decreasing from 19,554 counted in the 2001 Bolivian census to 16,944 counted in the 2012 Bolivian census, with an annual population change decrease of -2.1% between 2012 and 2024. The municipality's area is 1,029 km² and the population density stands at 12.95 per km² as of 2024.

The gender distribution of Tarabuco is nearly balanced, with a slight female majority. As of 2024, there are 6,731 women (50.5%) and 6,592 men (49.5%). The age distribution shows that a majority of the population are of working age, with 60% (7,996 people) aged between 15 and 64. Children aged 0 to 14 make up 24.7% (3,289) of the population, while the elderly account for 15.3% (2,038).

Tarabuco is a rural area, with a majority of the population (77.6%) residing in rural areas, while only 22.4% live in urban centers. The population identifies overwhelmingly as indigenous. In the 2024 census, a majority of residents identified as Quechua (51.9%), while 16.1% identified with other indigenous groups and 3% as Campesino peasants. A segment of 28.3% reported no specific indigenous identification. There were also a few who identified as Aymara, Guaraní, or Chiquitano. The indigenous majority is also shown in the language spoken, with Quechua being the most widley spoken (by 75.3% of the municipality). Spanish is the second most spoken language with 23.1% the rest of the population speaking other languages, including a few who speak Aymara and German.

== Culture ==
The Pukllay festival, which means "game" in Quechua, is a historical celebration held annually on March 19 and 20 in the Tarabuco Municipality. Together with the Ayarichi dance, the festival represents the Yampara culture and was submitted by Elizabeth Salguero, the Bolivian Minister of Cultures, to UNESCO for consideration as intangible cultural heritage. The festival also includes a recreation of the Battle of Jumbate, in which the local natives attempted to defend themselves from the Spaniard attack in March 1816.
