= Mitma =

Inca forced resettlement policy

Mitma was a policy of forced resettlement employed by the Incas. It involved the forceful migration of groups of extended families or ethnic groups from their home territory to lands recently conquered by the Incas. The objective was to transfer both loyalty to the state and a cultural baggage of Inca culture such as language, technology, economic and other resources into areas that were in transition.

This policy moved entire communities hundreds of kilometers to create enclaves of settlers called mitmaqkuna. This policy was used over a long period of time in all border regions of the empire.

Modern anthropological and linguistic studies suggest that about a quarter to a third of the population of the empire was resettled and is probably the largest single element of the Inca domination.

The strategic and political use of this policy might have also been related to transhumance, when large herds of llamas, alpacas and vicuñas were managed by the state. The element of political stability is obvious as the new settlements depended on the Incas for defense, supplies and governance.

== Etymology ==
The Spanish word mitimae is derived from the Quechua word mitamaq, meaning settler or newcomer. A mitimae, plural mitimaes, is a person whose group was resettled by the Inca for political reasons from their original area.

The term mitma is a Quechua word meaning "sprinkle, distribute, spread". The term comes from the Quechua word "mitmat", which meant "man moved, transported" or "outsider". It is related to another Inca word, "mit'a", which means labor taken in turns and is descended from the Quechua verb "mitmay". The Spanish also adopted the term "mit'a", and adapted the word to mean forced native labor during the Spanish colonial rule.

== Political use ==
Because the ethnic Inca were outnumbered by the population they ruled over by 100 to 1, there were many political systems they employed to control their conquered people. The mitma policy was one method that involved planned transfers of entire populations to regions that were less developed or had a high degree of rebellions or uprisings. Inhabitants of provinces that were loyal were moved and resettled in new or hostile territories, while rebellious villages were moved to consolidated regions. By using such methods, the ethnic Inca were able to help diminish resistance to the Inca nobility. Outside of Cuzco, much of the Inca government consisted of Inca officials that supervised a hierarchy of hereditary ethnic lords who were drafted into state service. The mitma system was effective because instead of trying to invent new governments, they just shuffled about existing ethnic groups.

The Inca kept great tabs on their populace in order to ensure that challenges to their authority did not occur. This included keeping detailed documentation, such as a census of the population, once they had been resettled. Once in their new settlement places, the mitmas participants were given full access to state storehouses for a period of two years, and native populations were expected to provide for them. By doing this, the Inca provided the means for mitma populations to achieve economic self sufficiency, andallowed mitma populations to reproduce their original social and production structure. Another way they kept the population in check was by having strict punishments for lawbreakers. If a resettled person tried to return to his native home, he was tortured. If he attempted to do so a second-time, the offender was executed. In addition, the Inca kept resettled elites in check by promoting them to bureaucratic positions in order to keep them dependent on imperial systems and ideologies for their own prestige and status.

== Inca control ==
In order to show their domination, the Inca required newly captured groups to adopt practices that would distinguish them from neighboring groups. For example, members of the Huancavelicas extracted six of each settlers' front teeth. To further perpetuate local differences, settlers were required to retain their traditional garb and practices after they were relocated.

These policies allowed the state to monitor the movement of its subjects, and officials could easily determine who belonged in a particular region and who was not supposed to be there. As mentioned, being found out of place had severe repercussions. However, even not wearing traditional costumes were crimes against the state punishable by torture or death.

== Areas affected ==
The Inca imperial state was established at the beginning of the fifteenth century. Before that time, the Inca state only sporadically attacked its neighbors in the Cuzco Valley, but it was still a weak, tribute-based state.

The Inca conquest began in the 1420s by reconstructing Cuzco after driving out the warriors of a powerful rival dominion, the Chancas. These were inhabitants of the territory northeast of Cuzco. The Tawantinsuyu (the realm of the Inca centered on Cuzco) originated from this transformation. After imposing rule over their neighbors, the Incas seized an opportunity to intervene in the internal affairs of those living further south in the Urubamba Valley and the Titicaca Basin.

The mitma policy has been well documented on the Altiplano plateau, specifically the Titicaca Basin. Under Inca administration, the coast and western slope between today's Peru and Chile were considered a distinct administrative region populated by enclaves of Altiplano settlers.

In addition to the Titicaca Basin, the Inca forces went north and stormed Cajamarca, capturing it and leaving a small garrison there. The Inca then returned to Cajamarca later in order to reinforce the isolated garrison.

Before returning to the capital, the Inca extended imperial control northward into the Ecuadorian highlands. The Inca forces then pushed the southern frontier of the empire into Northwest Argentina and Central Chile. It is thought that the existence of "Chilean" placenames such as Loa, Calama, and Erqui (Elqui) in southern Bolivia reflect Inca population transfers.

Population swaps were also used in the territory of present-day Ecuador and had a large impact in the population mix of the region. In the area of Tumipamba, the transition was almost complete.

== Ethnic groups subject to mitma transfers ==
- Argentina
  - Chichas
  - Churumatas
  - Chuyes
  - Moyos Moyos
  - Paypayas
- Bolivia
  - Churumatas
  - Moyos Moyos
  - Qulla people
  - Tomatas
- Chile
  - Churumatas
  - Moyos Moyos
- Ecuador

- Cañaris
- Saraguros
- Salasacas
- Puruhaes

- Peru
  - Moyos Moyos

== See also ==
- Mitimaes, Peruvian folk group

== Sources ==
- Covey, Alan R. (June 2000). "Inka Administration of the Far South Coast of Peru". Latin American Antiquity. 11 (2). Society for American Archaeology: 119–138. doi:10.2307/971851. JSTOR 971851. S2CID 164195422.
- D'Altroy, Terence (2003). The Incas. Malden, MA: Blackwell Publishing.
- de Freitas, Luiz Carlos de Carvalho Teixeira (2009). Who Were the Inca?. Sao Paulo, Brazil: Cerqueira Cesar.
- Mannheim, Bruce (1991). The Language of the Inka Since the European Invasion. Austin, Texas: University of Texas Press.
- Moseley, Michael (1992). The Inca and their Ancestors. London: Thames & Hudson Ltd.
- Patterson, Thomas (1987). Tribes, Chiefdoms, and Kingdoms. Washington D.C.: American Anthropology.
- Pease, Franklin (1981). The Inka and Political Power in the Andes. Mexico, D.F.: Colegio de Mexico.
