= Mesothermal valley =

In the Andes a mesothermal valley (Spanish: valle mesotérmico) is a valley characterized by its temperate or mesothermal climate. The term is typically applied to broad agricultural valleys in Bolivia and the Argentine Northwest. These valleys lies at altitudes above tropical and subtropical lowlands of the Amazon and Paraná basins but below colder highlands such as the Altiplano and the Puna de Atacama.

Examples of mesothermal valleys are:

- Central Valley of Cochabamba (c. 2500 m a.s.l.), Bolivia
- Valle de la Concepción (c. 1750 m a.s.l.), Bolivia
- Tafí del Valle (c. 2000 m a.s.l.), Argentina
- Bolsón de Fiambalá (c. 1500 m a.s.l.) in Abaucán Valley, Argentina
