= Moyos Moyos =

Indigenous people of Bolivia, Argentina and Peru

The locations were Moyos Moyos are known from colonial-era records. Their possible origin in Tarija is also marked.

The Moyos Moyos or Mayos Mayos were a historical Indigenous people in Bolivia, Argentina, and Peru.

Historically, Spanish chroniclers contrasted the Moyos Moyos have with "civilized" Andean tribes, and they considered them to be warlike, savage and ignorant of agriculture. There are historial records of Moyos Moyos in disparate regions of the former Inca Empire during its absorption into the Spanish Empire.

In the north, Moyos Moyos lived near the Inca capital of Cusco, to the east some Moyos Moyos inhabited the valleys of Cochabamba and Yamparáez and in the south there are mention of Moyos Moyos populations in Jujuy and Atacama Desert. Historian Barragán posits the Moyos Moyos are indigenous to Tarija Valley in southern Bolivia.

In 1596, the Moyos Moyos and Churumatas in Colpavilque (between Cochabamba and Yamparáez) rebelled against the Spanish.
