= Huáscar Aparicio =

Huáscar Aparicio Gonzales
- Born: June 1, 1972; Sucre, Bolivia
- Died: June 22, 2013 (aged 41); Chuquisaca Department, Bolivia
- Occupation: Folk singer

Huáscar Aparicio Gonzales (June 1, 1972, in Sucre – June 21, 2013, in Tomina) was a Bolivian folk singer.

== Biography ==
During his childhood he lived a long time in Tarija, where he finished his schooling at the historical and prestigious Colegio San Luis. He represented this school on numerous regional, departmental and national singing and folklore competitions which included different musical rhythms. During his student years Huáscar won several awards and recognitions due to the quality of his acting and compositions. For this reason, this school has honoured him and has adorned their glass cabinets with its awards among which songs dedicated to his mother and to a Bolivian teacher. His musical interest and enthusiasm led him to further expand his musical knowledge on the acoustic guitar and folk dances. He joined the local regional music school Achá Martinez directed by Prof. Nilo Soruco Arancibia. Thereafter, the first award he won was the 1st place in the Festival del Canto y la Aloja in 1993 with the unreleased cueca La fiesta de San Roque.

A year later he obtained at the same festival the 2nd place next to Guido Medinaceli and, also, the 3rd place together with Edna Aparicio in the duet category. By obtaining the 1st place as soloist and performer in the Festival Internacional del Lapacho of Bermejo with his theme Bolivia sin fronteras, Huáscar was further confirmed as musician in October of that year. At this same festival, he also won the 1st pase of cueca rhythm with the theme "Sufriendo". He represented Tarija in the culture festival in his native Sucre, capital of Bolivia. Huáscar also went to Argentina where he did concert tours in the city of Salta and also in La Mendieta, Province of Jujuy.

Years later he returned to Sucre where he continued their higher education but without neglecting his artistic career. In 1998 he recorded with a group called Querencia in Sucre. In 2004, Huáscar participated in a competition based on the exhibition of precious stones known as bolivianitas, which inspired him to compose the song entitled La bolivianita. This song was presented in a musical event attended by important Bolivian composers in which Húascar won the 1st place with his composition. This event marked the beginning of a series of international tours. He visited 80 countries to present their music and this gemstone.

== Death ==
He died on June 21, 2013, in the T'iyumayu, Tomina, town of Padilla, Bolivia, Chuquisaca Department, Bolivia at the age 41 years old due to a car accident. Huáscar was going to give a concert in Villamontes, Tarija with his sons Rolando Aparicio López (14 years old), Gustavo Aparicio López (13 years old) and two other members of his band, Rimber Callejas Brito (violin) and Fernando Anibarro Cruz (guitar). Due to the bad weather conditions and to an intense mist, the vehicle fell off a cliff of 250 meters. It happened at noon at a place called T'iyumayu, about 270 kilometers east of Sucre, close to the town of Monteagudo, in the Chaco area. In addition to the artist and his son Gustavo, who played drums, the guitarist Fernando Anibarro Limbert Cruz and the violinist Limbert Callejas Brito also died. Rolando, the other son who was traveling with Huascar Aparicio, was injured and received medical treatment on the town of Monteagudo.

== Records ==
=== Albums ===
- Recorded in 2005.
- Recorded and mixed in Estudio Geminis Records, Sucre – Bolivia.
- Artistic producer: Huascar G. Aparicio G.
- Recording technician: Yamil Patzi.
- Mixing and mastering: Yamil Patzi.
- Photography: Huascar G. Aparicio G.
- Design and layout: Huascar G. Aparicio G.
- Interactive design: Daniel Patzi.
- Promotion advertising: No te vayas.
- All songs were composed by Huascar G. Aparicio G. with the exception of "Vuelo enamorado" and "Solo pa bailarla".
- Grito de Libertad.
- Madre Amor.
- Añoranza.
- Barrio San Martín.
- No te Vayas.
- Vuelo Enamorado.
- La Vida del Profesor.
- Amor sin Cadenas.
- Que lindo Amarte.
- Camargo.
- Querer sin ser Querido.
- Por ti Villamontes.
- Solo pa Bailarla.
- Ay ay Amor.
