= Huáscar (given name) =

Huáscar or Huascar is a Spanish-language masculine given name. Notable people with the given name include:

- Huáscar (died 1532), Sapa Inca of the Inca Empire
- Huáscar Aparicio (1972–2013), Bolivian folk singer
- Huáscar Barradas (born 1964), Venezuelan flautist
- Huascar Brazobán (born 1989), Dominican baseball player
- Huascar Ynoa (born 1998), Dominican baseball player
