= San Juan del Oro River =

River in Bolivia

- Etymology: Spanish

Location
- Country: Bolivia
- Region: Potosí Department
- Municipality: Sur Lípez Province

Physical characteristics
- Mouth
  - coordinates: 21°43′14″S 66°02′05″W

The San Juan del Oro River is a river in the Potosí Department in Bolivia.

The indigenous tribe of Tomatas had settlements near this river in the 15th century before they were resettled by the Spanish in Tarija in 1574.

== See also ==
- Cinti Valley
- Río Grande de San Juan
- List of rivers of Bolivia
