= Oroncota =

Archaeological site in Bolivia

Coordinates: 19°30′34″S 64°51′03″W

Oroncota or Huruncuta was an Inca provincial center or capital on the border of Chuquisaca and Potosí Departments of Bolivia. Oroncota was captured by the Incas during the reign of Topa Inca Yupanqui (1471-1493) and served as a defensive outpost protecting the eastern frontiers of the Inca empire. The primary residents of the Oroncota area for more than 1,500 years have been the Yampara people. In the 16th century, during the last years of the Inca Empire and the early Spanish Empire, Oroncota and its region were under heavy attack by the Ava Guarani people (Chiriguanos) ethnic group who eventually gained control of the area.

Extensive and scattered ruins of the Inca and Yampara have been excavated by archaeologists.

== Setting ==
The Oroncota area on the eastern slopes of the Andes consists of the narrow valleys of the Pilcomayo River and its tributary the Inkapampa River for a distance of 20 kilometres (12 miles), at an elevation of about 2,000 metres (6,600 ft). Agriculture was feasible near the river and on alluvial fans. Unlike many other Andean prehistoric sites, the inhabitants of Oroncota did not build stone terraces for agriculture.

On the western side of the Pilcomayo River the Pukara or Fortress Plateau rises steeply above the river valleys. The plateau is triangle shaped, about 5 kilometres (3.1 miles) east to west at its widest point and 10 kilometres (6.2 miles) north to south. The average elevation of the plateau is about 2,900 metres (9,500 ft). Although the climate is semi-arid, in prehistoric and early historic times parts of the plateau were cultivated. In the 21st century, the plateau is uninhabited and the river valleys only sparsely populated.

Oroncota is located 70 kilometres (43 miles) southeast of the city of Sucre and 95 kilometres (59 miles) east of the city of Potosí, the site of the richest silver mines in the Americas in the 16th century. Thus, to protect the highlands and the mines, the control of the Oroncota region was of defensive importance for both the Inca and their Spanish successors.

Based on the land suitable for agriculture, archaeologist Sonia Alconini has calculated that the population of Oroncota was between 1,442 and 4,122 during its existence as a settlement. About two-thirds of the population lived in the valleys and one third on the plateau. The most extensive ruins, and presumably the highest population, are from the Inca period.

== Yampara ==
The Yampara or Tarabuco are the primary ethnic group occupying the Oroncota region. Oroncota was near the southern edge of Yampara territory and other lesser-known ethnic groups such as the Chui and Chicha may have been mixed in with them. The origin of the Yampara is uncertain, although they may have migrated into the area from the east. Although probably speakers of Pukina, an extinct language, in prehistoric times, by the 16th century they spoke Aymara in common with the peoples living on the high altiplano of present-day Bolivia. The Aymara drew a distinction between themselves and the "bow and arrow" (e.g. less civilized) people of the eastern mountains and forests. The Yampara seemed to have inhabited a middle ground between the "civilized" highlanders and the "less-civilized" lowlanders.

Alconini divides the prehistory and early history of Oroncota into four periods: Early Yampara (400-800 CE), Classic Yampara (800-1300 CE), Late Yampara-Inca (1300-1536 CE), and Colonial (1536-1700 CE). The different periods are distinguished by pottery styles. The early Yampara at Oroncota primarily lived in the Pilcomayo valley, but during the Classical Yampara and subsequent times, the plateau became more important for residence. Factors encouraging settlement on the plateau probably included defense.

By the time of the Incas it appears that the Yampara were allied with a number of other Aymara kingdoms in the Charcas confederation. During Inca, and possibly earlier times, and in common with other Andean peoples, the Yampara were organized into an upper and lower moiety. The center of the upper moiety was in Yotala about 18 kilometres (11 miles) south of Sucre and the lower moiety was centered in Quilaquila, 16 kilometres (9.9 mi) southwest of Sucre. Each moiety had 10 ayllus (territorial clans).

Illustrating that the Yampara at Oroncota remained some independence from the Incas is the archaeological site of Yoroma, 4 kilometres (2.5 miles) north of Oroncota near the junction of the Pilcomayo and Incapampa rivers. Yoroma was a center for lithic tool-making and ceremonial feasting for both the Yampara and Inca. However, Yoroma retained its Yampara character during Inca times and its leaders and elites prospered. The Yampara of Yoroma retained autonomy and functioned more as allies than subjects of the Inca—perhaps united by a common enemy, the Chiriguanos.

== Incas and Spanish ==
The Yampara and other people of the eastern Andes came under the influence of the Inca Empire in the 15th century. The Spanish chronicler, Bernabé Cobo, said that during the reign of emperor Tupac Yupanqui (1471-1493) the Inca attempted to incorporate the Aymara kingdoms and the eastern Andes into their empire. 20,000 people fled the invading Inca army and took refuge on the plateau at Oroncota. Unable to overcome the defenses of the plateau, Tupac Yupanqui staged fiestas and offered beautiful women to lure the defenders out of their fortress plateau, then sent his army forward to capture Oroncota and incorporate it into the empire as part of Inca Collasuyu.

This story has fanciful elements, but may be in essence true. In whatever case, the Incas established a presence in Oroncota. They built three complexes mixed in among the Yampara settlements. The first and largest, called Oroncota, was near the center of the plateau and covered an area of 6 hectares (15 acres). It featured a main plaza, surrounded by buildings and qullqas for storage. The stonework was characteristic of high-prestige Inca architecture, indicating that the buildings symbolized Inca administration and control. A second site on the plateau, El Pedregal, about 4 kilometres (2.5 miles) south, was a defensive outpost in an unpopulated area covering .8 hectares (2.0 acres). The third Inca complex, Inkarry Moqo, was located near the Inkapampa River about 5 kilometres (3.1 miles) north of Oroncota, covered 2 hectares (4.9 acres), and was apparently dedicated to collecting and storing agricultural products. The Inca facilities at Oroncota were small compared to those of other provincial settlements.

The Incas interest and control of Oroncota illustrates the oft-cited principle of the vertical archipelago attributed to the Incas and their predecessors who lived on the austere Altiplano of Peru and Bolivia. Needing the agricultural products grown at lower altitudes, especially maize, coca, and cotton, the Incas established colonies or gained control in areas of lower elevations and warmer climates. Oroncota also had the function of frontier defense, protecting the empire from the raids of the Guarani people derisively called Chiriguanaes by the Incas and Chiriguanos by the Spanish. About 100 kilometres (62 mi) east of Oroncota the Incas established a chain of defensive outposts to defend Oroncota and the transportation corridor to the Andes highlands. The outposts from north to south were Incaprica, Cuzcotoro, Iñao, and Incahuasi.

Beginning about 1520, Chiriguano raids threatened the eastern Andes frontier of the Incas (and later the Spanish). Two Yampara officials, Aymoro and his son, Francisco Aymoro, led the effort to retain Inca control. The Incas sent officials (Ojejones) and mitma (highland populations forced to move to recently conquered areas) to bolster the defenses by staffing and provisioning Oroncota and other Inca settlements. The Aymoros, Yampara, Orejones, and mitma probably held Oroncota for a time against the Chiriguanos.

After their conquest of the Inca Empire in the 1530s, the Spanish continued to face a military challenge from the Chiriguanos in the eastern Andes. Viceroy Francisco de Toledo visited Oroncota or passed nearby in 1574 during a failed Spanish military operation against the Chiriguanos. He made an apparent reference to Oroncota when he mentioned that the "final Inca fortresses" had been captured by the Chiriguanos.

Spanish records mention Churumata people inhabiting the area in 1621, albeit this group was not indigenous to the area but to the Central Valley of Tarija. In Chile the Churumatas are reported from Spanish colonial era sources in Elqui Valley.
