= Nilo Soruco =

Bolivian singer-songwriter (1927–2004)

Nilo Rixio Soruco Arancibia (6 July 1927, Tarija, Bolivia – 31 March 2004, Tarija, Bolivia) was a Bolivian singer-songwriter.

Soruco wrote more than 300 songs. A communist, he was banned under the Bolivian leadership of the 1970s. Soruco was in exile in Caracas, Venezuela until 1978.

Among his tunes are "La vida es linda", "Ya la pagarán", "Duraznero", "Instantánea", and particularly "Caraqueña", composed in his Venezuelan exile, which are sung at Bolivia's popular celebrations.

Soruco won Bolivia's National Culture Prize in 2003.

Discography:

Album	Song	Rithm
CANTARES DE BOLIVIA EN TIEMPO DE HISTORIA	LA TRAGEDIA DEL CHAPACO	Tonada-Canción
	CUBA NO CAERA	Cueca
	ROMPIERON RELACIONES	Huayño
