= Yamparáez Province =

- Province
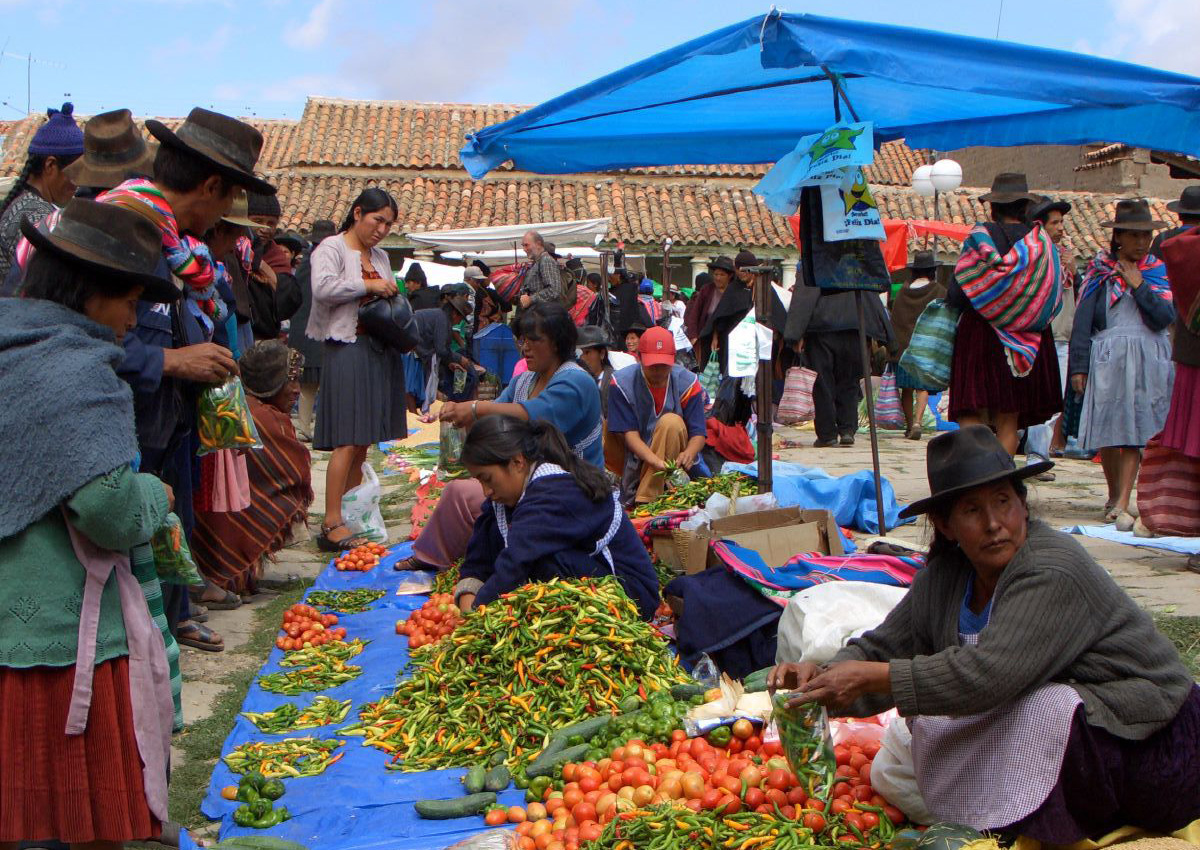
- Market in Tarabuco

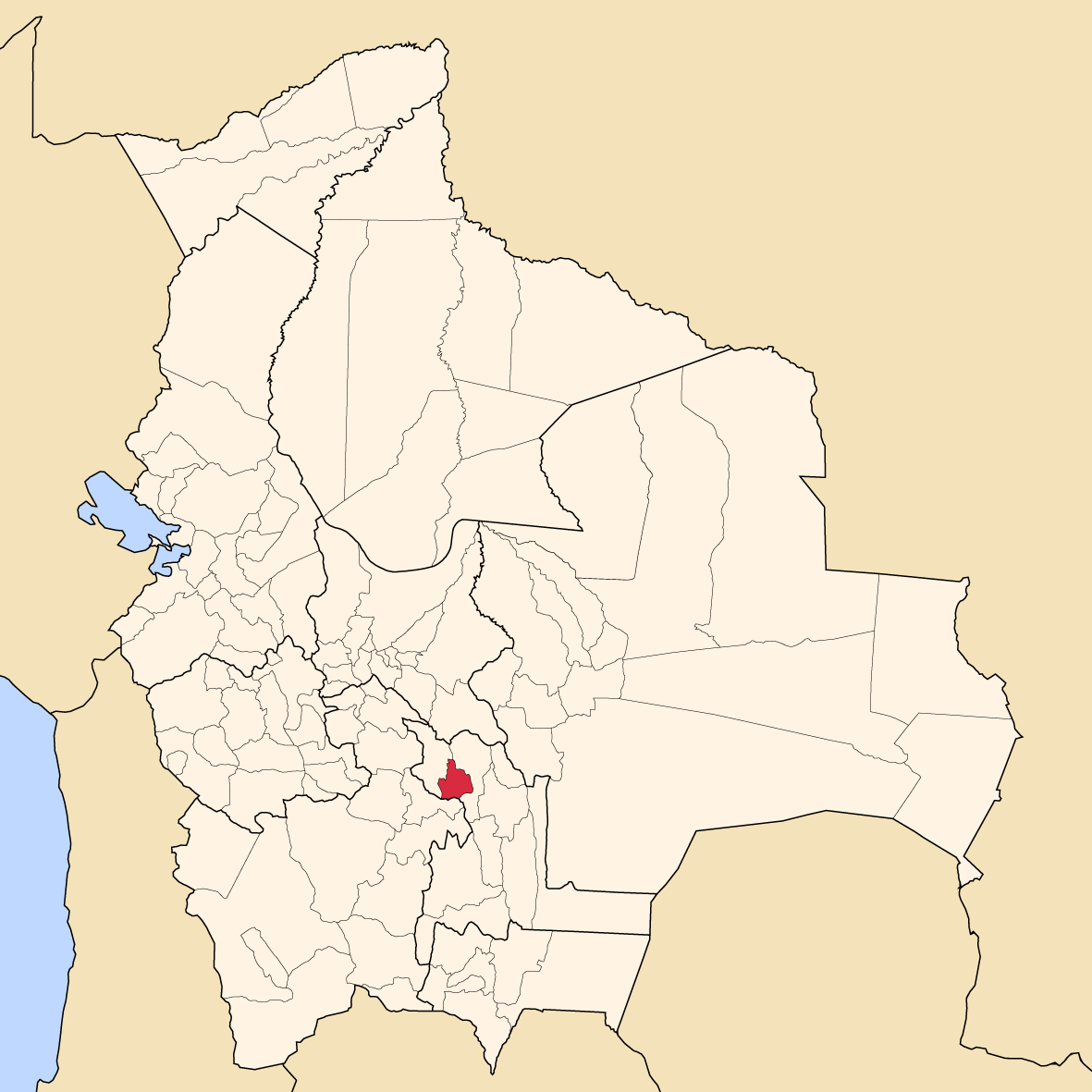
- Location of Yamparáez Province within Bolivia
- Coordinates: 19°10′S 64°58′W
- Country: Bolivia
- Department: Chuquisaca Department
- Capital: Tarabuco

Area
  - Total: 627 sq mi (1,625 km^{2})

Population (2024 census)
  - Total: 21,788
  - Density: 34.73/sq mi (13.41/km^{2})
  - Ethnicities: Quechuas
- Time zone: UTC-4 (BOT)

Yamparáez is a province in the Bolivian department of Chuquisaca. It is divided in two sections: first section with head in the town of Tarabuco, and the second section with its head in Yamparáez.

== Subdivision ==
The province is divided into two municipalities which are further subdivided into cantons.

Section	Municipality	Seat
1st	Tarabuco Municipality	Tarabuco
2nd	Yamparáez Municipality	Yamparáez

== The people ==
The people are predominantly indigenous citizens of Quechuan descent.

Ethnic group	Tarabuco Municipality (%)	Yamparáez Municipality (%)
Quechua	92.9	96.5
Aymara	0.3	0.3
Guaraní, Chiquitos, Moxos	0.1	0.1
Not indigenous	6.6	3.0
Other indigenous groups	0.1	0.1

Ref.: obd.descentralizacion.gov.bo

== Languages ==
The languages spoken in the province are mainly Quechua and Spanish.

Language	Tarabuco Municipality	Yamparáez Municipality
Quechua	17,850	9,222
Aymara	52	21
Guaraní	1	0
Another native	2	4
Spanish	5,605	4,138
Foreign	17	6
Only native	12,592	5,287
Native and Spanish	5,271	3,938
Only Spanish	334	200

Ref.: obd.descentralizacion.gov.bo
