= Valle de la Concepción =

Valley in Bolivia

Coordinates: 21.695015°S 64.656327°W

Valle de la Concepción is a mesothermal valley in the far south of the Bolivian Andes. It is a wine region of Bolivia. Relative to other areas of vineyards in Bolivia valle de la Concepción is prone to experience hail.

The valley, alongside other areas southeast of Tarija, was the homeland of the Churumatas tribe which was otherwise greatly scattered during the times of the Inca and Spanish empires.
