= Mitimaes =

Peruvian folk music group

- Origin: Arequipa, Peru
- Genres: Folk music
- Years active: 1983–present
- Members: Clinio Maldonado Mercado; Plinio Maldonado Mercado; José Roberto Huayta Quispe; Bede Maldonado Mercado; Dino Maldonado Mercado; Edward Maldonado Mercado
- Past members: Aquiles Delgado Argote; Guillermo Delgado Argote

Mitimaes is a folk music group from Peru. The group dates from 1983, having its first public performance in March in the Festival of the Zampoñas of Gold, organized by Department of Education in Arequipa winning first place in Peruvian folk music. Towards the end of the same year they became recognized as one of the better folk groups that year; and they undertook a tour by Europe. In May 1984 they recorded their first album in Germany with the title of Hopes of Liberty and they set to music the movie Mister Tourist: a documentary on the islands of Taquile in Lake Titicaca (Puno), besides appearing on television and radio in Spain and Germany. During that year they toured throughout Europe.

In March 1985 they began the recording of their second production in Spain finishing it in Germany under the title Huaukey (brother). That same year they set to music a story for children and themes on the Peruvian folklore, next to a teaching material called Eine Brücke nach Peru (A bridge toward Peru) for the Institution Misereor of Germany, finishing with this work their tour by Europe.

In 1986, in covenant with the Region Education Department Arequipa, they carry out a series of free concerts in schools during all the year. In 1987 they returned to Europe to carry out another artistic tour. In 1990 while on another tour by Europe they recorded their third musical production in Germany with the title Light of Hope. In 1992 they travelled to Japan representing Peru in the International Festival of Okayama. In the same year they carried out their last tour in Europe, thereafter deciding to work in their native land Peru.

== Origin of the name ==
Mitimaes comes from the Quechua word mitma meaning "resettlement". These were originally groups of families taken from their communities by the Inca State and transferred to loyal or conquered towns to perform political, cultural, social, and economic functions.

== Membership ==
The founding members:

- Clinio Maldonado Mercado
- Plinio Maldonado Mercado
- Bede Maldonado Mercado
- Dino Maldonado Mercado
- Aquiles Delgado Argote
- Guillermo Delgado Argote

Present members:

- Clinio Maldonado Mercado
- Plinio Maldonado Mercado
- José Roberto Huayta Quispe
- Bede Maldonado Mercado
- Dino Maldonado Mercado
- Edward Maldonado Mercado

== Discography ==
- Mitimaes live - Alemania (1983)
- Esperanzas de Libertad (1984)
- Huaukey (hermano) (1985)
- Luz de Esperanza (1990)
- Mitimaes en vivo - Perú (1991)
