= Guadalquivir River (Bolivia) =

River in Bolivia

Coordinates: 21°24′S 64°45′W

The Guadalquivir River (Spanish, Río Guadalquivir) is a river in Bolivia. It is a tributary of the Río Grande de Tarija, which flows into the Bermejo River and the Paraguay River. The river flows by the city of Tarija. The river was named after the Guadalquivir river in Andalusia, Spain.

== See also ==
- List of rivers of Bolivia
