= Abelardo Gamarra Rondó =

Peruvian writer, composer and journalist

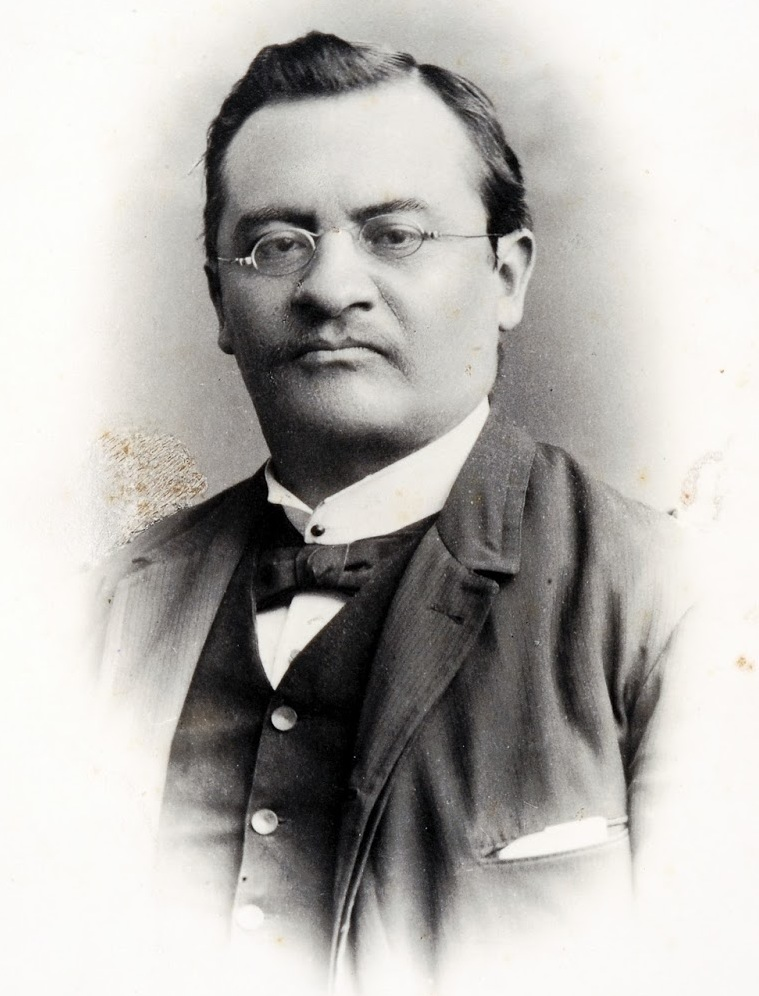
- Abelardo Gamarra Rondó
- Born: August 31, 1852; Sarín District, Huamachuco, Peru
- Died: 9 July 1924 (aged 71); Lima, Peru
- Occupations: writer, composer and journalist
- Known for: Marinera

Abelardo Gamarra Rondó (August 31, 1852 – July 9, 1924) was a Peruvian writer, composer and journalist. He coined the name of marinera, a typical dance in Peru. He composed the first marinera song called La Concheperla.

Son of Manuel Guillermo Gamarra and Rondo Jacoba, began his studies at the Colegio San Nicolas, in his hometown, and, when he moved to Lima, he attended high school at the National College of Our Lady of Guadalupe between 1866 and 1870.

== Works ==
- The Rogue in over my head (1876)
- Behind the Cross of the Devil (1877)
- Lima Carnival Scenes (1879)
- The novena of Rogue (1885)
- Here come the Chileans (1886)
- Traits Pen (1902)
- Heresy (1902)
- Something of Peru and many ragamuffins (1905)
- Lima (1907)
- One hundred years of life perdularia (1921)
- Manco Capac (1923)
