= Tarabuco =

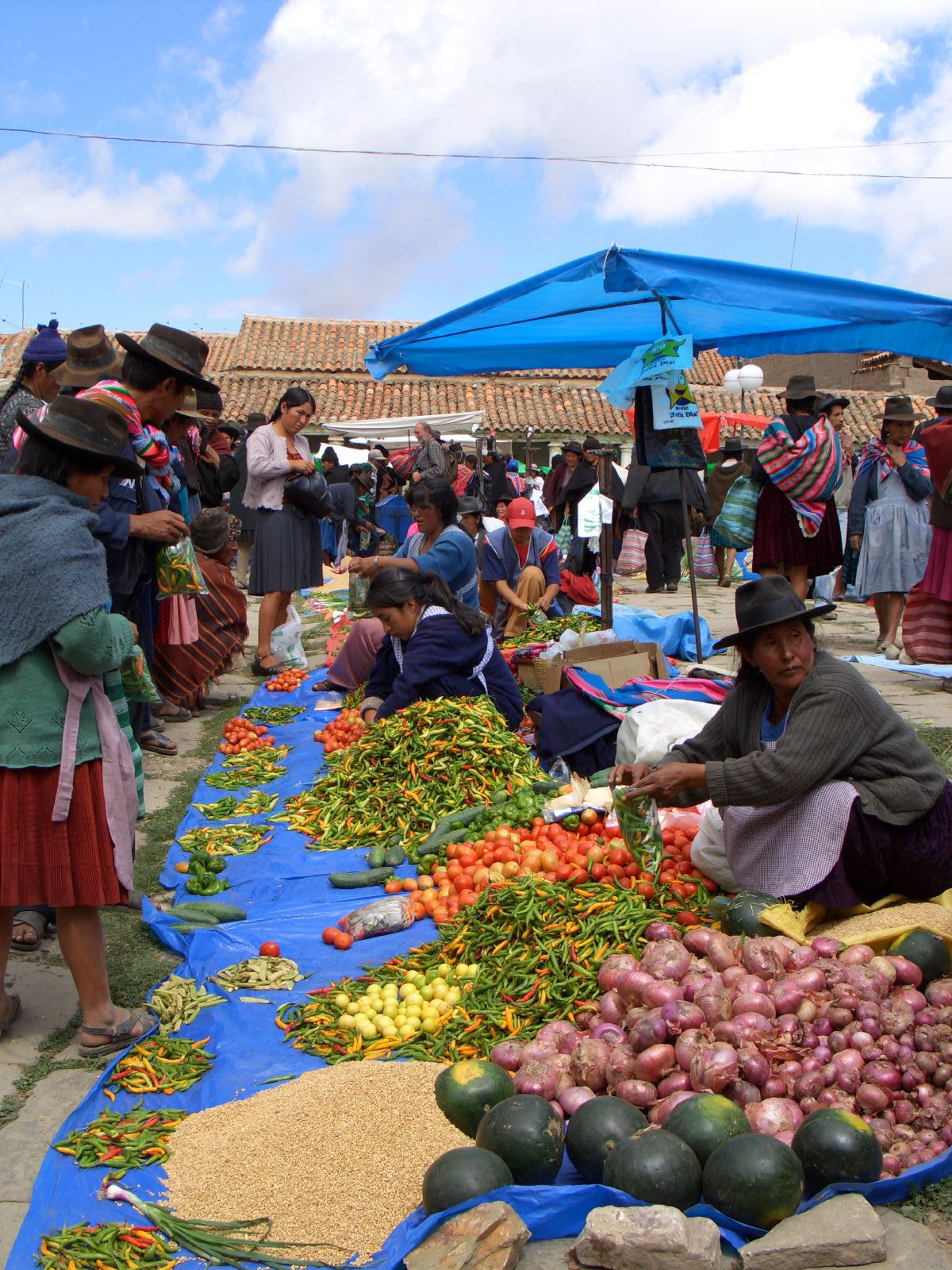
- Fresh products at the market in Tarabuco.

- Location in Bolivia
- Coordinates: 19°10′S 64°55′W
- Country: Bolivia
- Department: Chuquisaca Department
- Province: Yamparáez Province
- Municipality: Tarabuco Municipality
- Elevation: 10,790 ft (3,290 m)

Population (2001)
  - Total: 2,442
- Time zone: UTC-4 (BOT)

Tarabuco is a Bolivian town in the department of Chuquisaca, capital of the Yamparáez Province and seat of Tarabuco Municipality. It is best known as the home of the Yampara culture. Its people host the Pujllay festival in March each year. Members of the local indigenous community gather for Mass, parade in their colorful traditional costumes, drink plenty of chicha, and celebrate.

Each Sunday, the held open-air market attracts locals and tourists alike. Many people wear traditional Yampara costumes, which not only preserve their identity but also advertise their location of origin within the area to others within the Tarabuco area.

== Climate ==
Climate data for Tarabuco, elevation 3,284 m (10,774 ft)
Month	Jan	Feb	Mar	Apr	May	Jun	Jul	Aug	Sep	Oct	Nov	Dec	Year
Mean daily maximum °C (°F)	18.3 (64.9)	18.4 (65.1)	18.6 (65.5)	19.0 (66.2)	19.6 (67.3)	18.7 (65.7)	18.5 (65.3)	19.5 (67.1)	20.1 (68.2)	20.5 (68.9)	20.1 (68.2)	19.5 (67.1)	19.2 (66.6)
Daily mean °C (°F)	12.9 (55.2)	12.9 (55.2)	13.0 (55.4)	12.7 (54.9)	12.3 (54.1)	11.3 (52.3)	10.6 (51.1)	11.7 (53.1)	12.6 (54.7)	13.4 (56.1)	13.6 (56.5)	13.5 (56.3)	12.5 (54.6)
Mean daily minimum °C (°F)	7.6 (45.7)	7.5 (45.5)	7.4 (45.3)	6.5 (43.7)	5.0 (41.0)	3.8 (38.8)	2.7 (36.9)	4.0 (39.2)	5.0 (41.0)	6.4 (43.5)	7.0 (44.6)	7.4 (45.3)	5.9 (42.5)
Average precipitation mm (inches)	131.2 (5.17)	95.5 (3.76)	62.5 (2.46)	20.2 (0.80)	4.2 (0.17)	2.1 (0.08)	3.4 (0.13)	6.0 (0.24)	19.1 (0.75)	32.6 (1.28)	49.2 (1.94)	91.0 (3.58)	517 (20.36)
Average precipitation days	13.7	11.1	8.0	2.9	0.7	0.4	0.5	1.1	2.9	4.4	6.1	10.0	61.8
Average relative humidity (%)	80.0	81.2	80.0	74.0	59.2	52.9	52.2	54.8	60.4	65.9	70.3	74.2	67.1
Source: Servicio Nacional de Meteorología e Hidrología de Bolivia

== See also ==
- Oroncota, Yampara settlement and Inca fortress.
