= Yamparáez =

Coordinates: 19°11′S 65°08′W

- Interactive map of Yamparáez
- Country: Bolivia
- Department: Chuquisaca Department
- Province: Yamparáez Province
- Municipality: Yamparáez Municipality
- Canton: Yamparáez Canton

Government
  - Mayor: Anastacio Tango Duarte (2008)

Population (2001)
  - Total: 903
- Time zone: UTC-4 (BOT)

Yamparáez is the seat of Yamparáez Municipality located in the Yamparáez Province in the Chuquisaca Department of Bolivia. At the time of census 2001 it had 903 inhabitants.
