= Tomatas =

Extinct Chilean-tarijeño Indigenous group

The locations associated with the Tomatas. In red known historic Tomata settlements in the Inca Empire. In yellow the Spanish resettlement of Tomatas in Tarija Valley. In grey tentative Pre-Inca homelands of the Tomatas.

The Tomatas are an extinct Indigenous people that inhabited parts of parts of present-day southern Bolivia at the time of Spanish arrival in the 15th century. The Tomatas appear to have originated in the area of Copiapó in the Chilean Norte Chico as attested in the designation "tomatas copiapoes" found in early Spanish manuscripts. This group was likely uprooted from their homelands in Chile as part of the population transfers of the Inca Empire. Based on archaeological remains, the Elqui Valley, about 240 km south of Copiapó Valley, has also been proposed as a possible origin. Conquistador Luis de Fuentes, moved this group again by a much shorter distance than the Incas did and resettled the Tomatas near his new city Tarija. The Tomatas appear to have given placenames from their old lands to their new area of settlement thus explaining the existence of "Chilean" placenames such as Loa, Calama, and Erqui (Elqui) in Bolivia.

Early Spanish conquerors encountered Tomatas in the Cinti region of Bolivia, in particular around San Juan del Oro River, and brought them to the depopulated area of Tarija to assist a new Spanish settlement.
