= Villa Abecia Municipality =

Coordinates: 20°58′33″S 65°13′52″W

Villa Abecia s a town and municipality in Bolivia, capital of the province of Sud Cinti in the department of Chuquisaca. The town of Villa Abecia is located on Bolivia's National Route 1.

== History ==
Spanish presence in Villa Abecia dates back to at least 1588, when the priory of “Pilaya and Pazpaya” (or Paspaya) was founded on January 13. The priory's formal objective was the indoctrination of the “unfaithful Indians.” The Dominicans and Augustinians were the first to establish their churches, In later years, the Jesuits and Franciscans arrived to consolidate Spanish colonization. The lands became vineyards and olive plantations. The Spanish established the province of Pilaya and Pazpaya.

In the early nineteenth century, after several secessionist calls across South America, residents of Chuquisaca rose up against the Spanish royal government. Vicente Camargo arrived from the north to become head of the guerrillas of Cinti, organized by himself and participated in several battles and combats, such as the combat of Culpina.

The province of Cinti was created by Supreme Decree on January 23, 1826, during the government of the Marshal of Ayacucho, Antonio José de Sucre. Camataquí, as a municipality, was created by Supreme Decree of November 20, 1879.

By Law of November 5, 1886, the second judicial and municipal section of the province of Cinti was created, consisting of two cantons: Camataquí and San Juan, the first divided by the vice-cantons Tárcana and La Torre, and the second by the vice-cantons of Impora and Taraya.

In 1944, during the government of Col. Gualberto Villarroel, the province was divided in two, thus creating the province of Sud Cinti according to the Supreme Decree of March 22 and 23 with its head or capital in “Camataquí”, which was renamed in the instant “Villa General Germán Busch”, in homage to Germán Busch Becerra. The province was constituted by two municipal sections, the first section by the municipality of Camataquí and the second section by the municipality of Culpina.

By Supreme Decree No. 679 of January 9, 1947, Villa General Germán Busch, municipality and head of Sud Cinti, was renamed “Villa Abecia”, in honor of Dr. Valentín Abecia Ayllón.

During the history of Villa Abecia it was known as: Camataquí, Villa Rosario, Villa Carlos V. Romero, Villa Nicolás Ortiz, Villa General Germán Busch and finally Villa Abecia.

== Demography ==
La población de la localidad ha aumentado en un 30% durante las dos últimas décadas, mientras que la población del municipio ha aumentado solo marginalmente:

| Año | Population (town) | Population (municipality) | Fuente |
|---|---|---|---|
| 1992 | 730 | 3,160 | Census |
| 2001 | 733 | 3,195 | Census |
| 2012 | 1,022 | 3,514 | Census |
| 2024 | | 5,371 | Census |

The municipal population growth in 2024 was due in part to a concerted campaign by the mayor to encourage migrants from Villa Abecia with dual residency to return to the municipality during the 2024 Census.

The municipality comprises 65 communities (localities), with the capital of the municipality being the town of Villa Abecia with 1,211 inhabitants (2012 Census) in the eastern part of the municipality.
