= Santa Elena River =

Santa Elena
- Etymology: Spanish

Location
- Country: Bolivia
- Region: Chuquisaca Department
- Municipality: Nor Cinti Province

Basin features
- Tributaries
  - right: Kunturiri, Emeterio, Quemado Mayu

The Santa Elena River is a river of Bolivia in the Chuquisaca Department, Nor Cinti Province, partly on the border of Inka Wasi Municipality and San Lucas Municipality. It is a right affluent of the upper Pillku Mayu.

== See also ==
- List of rivers of Bolivia
- Inka Wasi River
- Puka Pampa River
