= Tumusla River =

Location
- Country: Bolivia
- Region: Chuquisaca Department, Potosí Department

Physical characteristics
- Mouth
  - coordinates: 20°57′48″S 65°11′10″W

Basin features
- Tributaries
  - left: Qaysa, Vitichi, Jilche, Camargo, Las Lagunas
  - right: Wayrani, Tocla Vichacla, Cotagaita, Río Chico

The Tumusla River is a river of Bolivia in the Potosí Department (Antonio Quijarro Province, Nor Chichas Province) as well as in the Chuquisaca Department (Nor Cinti Province and Sud Cinti Province). It gets waters from the Los Frailes and Chichas mountain ranges. Upstream the river is named Yura and Toropalca. Cotagaita, a right affluent, is its most important tributary.

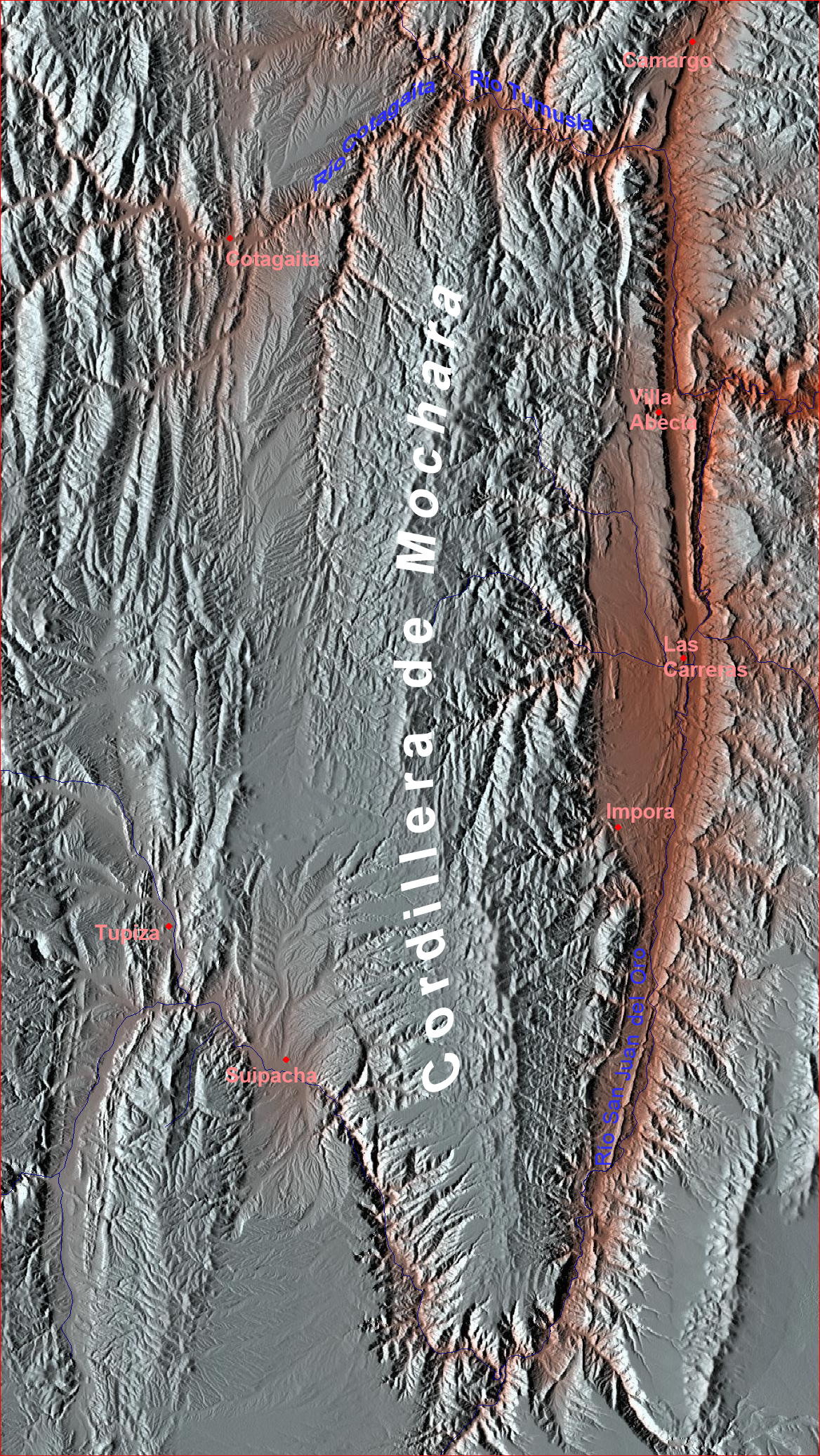
Confluence of Cotagaita River with Tumusla River and confluence of Tumusla River with San Juan del Oro River

Tumusla River flows towards the Pillku Mayu while the river successively receives the names Camblaya (at the confluence with San Juan del Oro River) and Pilaya. The Pilaya River is a right tributary of Pillku Mayu.

== See also ==
- Inka Wasi River
- Jatun Mayu
- List of rivers of Bolivia

== Sources ==
- Rand McNally, The New International Atlas, 1993.
