= La Laguna Lake =

Lake in Sud Cinti, Chuquisaca, Bolivia

- Laguna de Culpina
- Location within Bolivia Location within South America
- Interactive map of La Laguna Lake
- Location: Chuquisaca Department
- Coordinates: 20°52′00″S 64°59′50″W
- Basin countries: Bolivia
- Surface area: 7.8 km^{2} (3.0 sq mi)
- Surface elevation: 2,926 m (9,600 ft)
- Settlements: Culpina

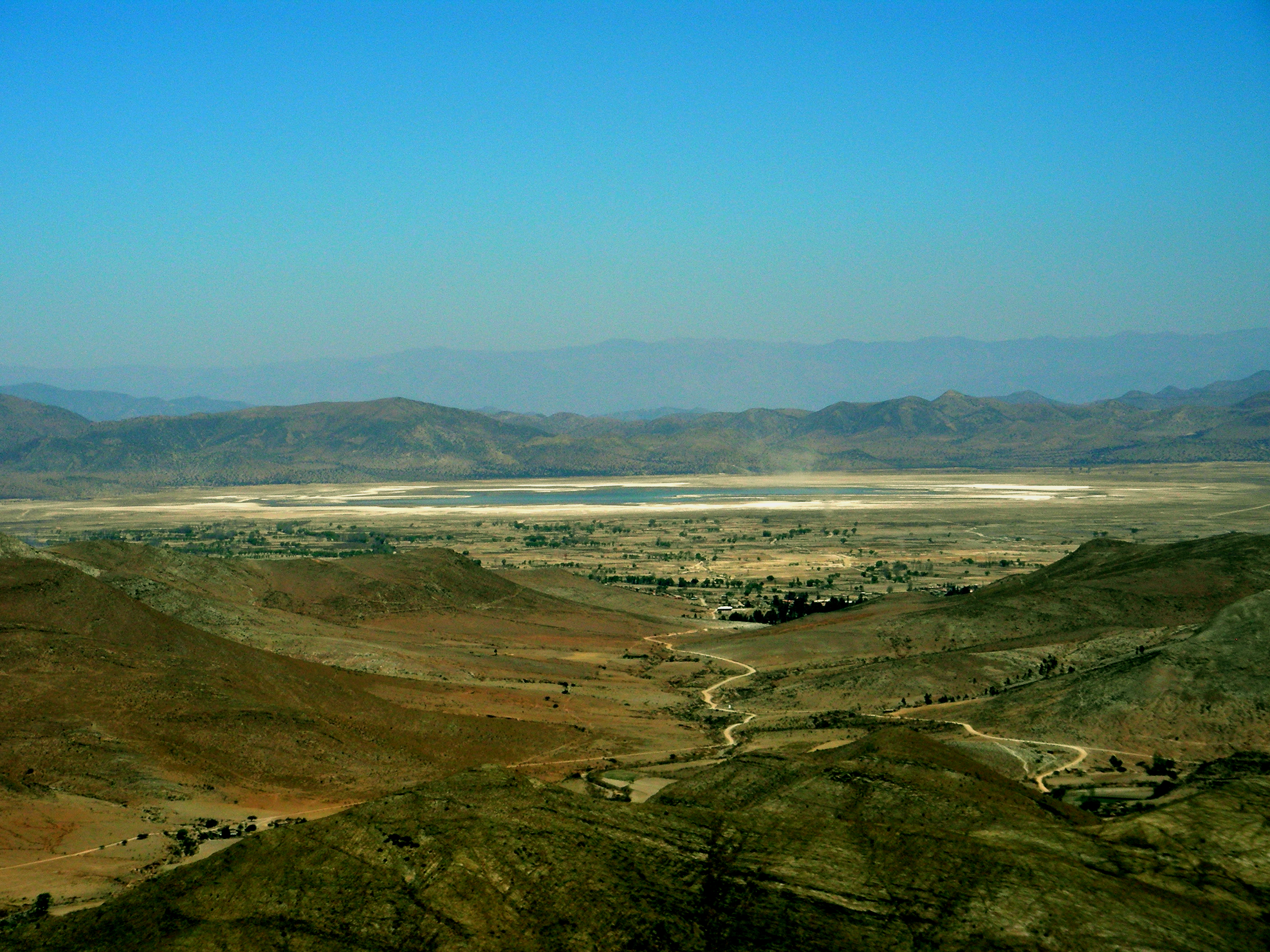
View of La Laguna Lake

La Laguna Lake is a lake in the Sud Cinti Province, Chuquisaca Department, Bolivia. Lying at an elevation of 2,926 metres (9,600 ft), it has a surface area is 7.8 square kilometres (3.0 sq mi).
