= List of Bolivian drinks =

The following is a list of alcoholic and non-alcoholic beverages that are popular among the people of Bolivia. Singani ( the Bolivian national drink) is the main liquor used to produce some of these mixed drinks. Pisco is another liquor that is easily found in Bolivia, and is the main component of another branch of beverages listed here.

== Singani-based ==
- Chuflay
- Coctel de Tumbo
- Yungueño

== Pisco-based ==
- Pisco Sour – Also very popular in Peru, made from grapes and matured in wooden barrels.

== Somewhat Illegal ==
- Casquito – A mix of pure alcohol and soft drink, mostly cola. It is often associated with poor people and prohibited due to its usage of pure alcohol.

== Non-alcoholic ==
- Mocochinchi – Dehydrated peach cider
- Api (Morado) – A maize drink, generally using purple maize but often mixed with white maize, one of them being hot.
- Somó – Made from maize called “frangollo”.

 Not forgetting Chive (pron. chivay) very popular in Oriente Bolivia - made from fermented yuca/manioc/cassava then dried, mixed with sugar and broken down to a coarse powder and mixed with water to drink
