= Q'illu Apachita =

Mountain in Bolivia

- Location within Bolivia

Highest point
- Elevation: 4,440 m (14,570 ft)
- Coordinates: 20°07′15″S 64°47′35″W

Geography
- Location: Bolivia, Chuquisaca Department
- Parent range: Andes

Q'illu Apachita (Aymara and Quechua q'illu yellow, apachita the place of transit of an important pass in the principal routes of the Andes; name for a stone cairn in the Andes, a little pile of rocks built along the trail in the high mountains, also spelled Khellu Apacheta) is a mountain in the Bolivian Andes which reaches a height of approximately 4,440 m (14,570 ft). It is located in the Chuquisaca Department, Nor Cinti Province, San Lucas Municipality. It lies northeast of Llaqta Pampa.
