= Allqamari =

Mountain in Bolivia

- Location within Bolivia

Highest point
- Elevation: 4,026 m (13,209 ft)
- Coordinates: 19°59′57″S 64°54′13″W

Geography
- Location: Bolivia, Chuquisaca Department
- Parent range: Andes

Allqamari (Quechua for mountain caracara, also spelled Alcamari) is a 4,026-metre-high (13,209 ft) mountain in the Bolivian Andes. It is located in the Chuquisaca Department, Nor Cinti Province, San Lucas Municipality. It lies near the Waylla Mayu.
