= Kunturiri (Chuquisaca) =

Mountain in Bolivia

- Location within Bolivia

Highest point
- Elevation: 4,604 m (15,105 ft)
- Coordinates: 20°03′55″S 64°45′01″W

Geography
- Location: Bolivia, Chuquisaca Department
- Parent range: Andes

Kunturiri (Aymara kunturi condor, -(i)ri a suffix, also spelled Condoriri) is a 4,604-metre-high (15,105 ft) mountain in the Bolivian Andes. It is located in the Chuquisaca Department, Nor Cinti Province, San Lucas Municipality. It lies northwest of Turu Punta.
