= Chiñi Mayu =

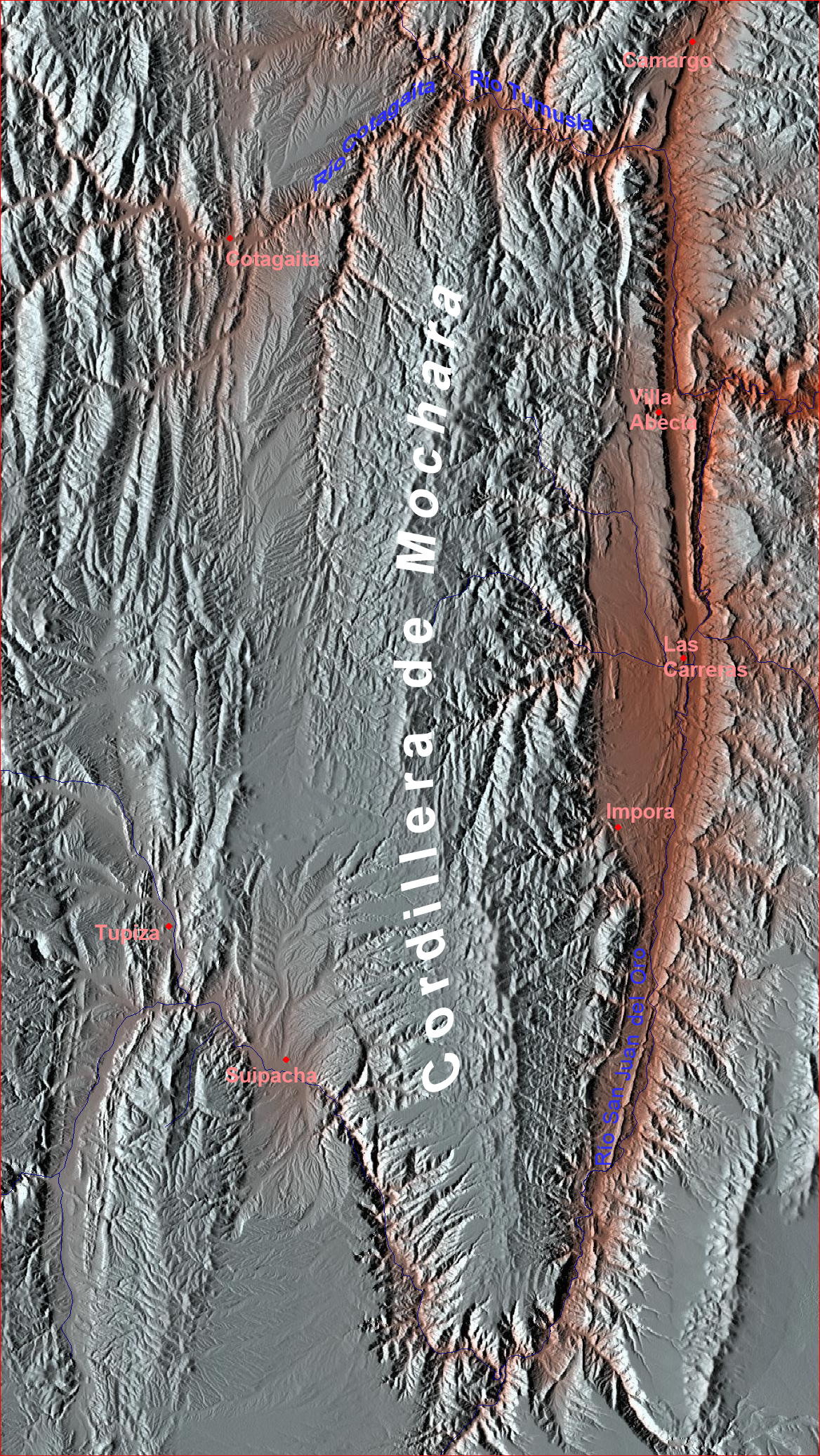
- Etymology: Quechua

Location
- Country: Bolivia
- Region: Chuquisaca Department
- Municipality: Nor Cinti Province

Physical characteristics
- Mouth: Tumusla River

Basin features
- Tributaries
  - left: Parintaca, Nasa Q'ara, Ch'uru, San Pedro

Chiñi Mayu (Quechua chiñi bat, mayu river, "bat river", hispanicized spellings Chiñimayu, Chini Mayu) is a Bolivian river in the Chuquisaca Department, Nor Cinti Province, San Lucas Municipality and Camargo Municipality. It belongs to the Pillku Mayu river basin.

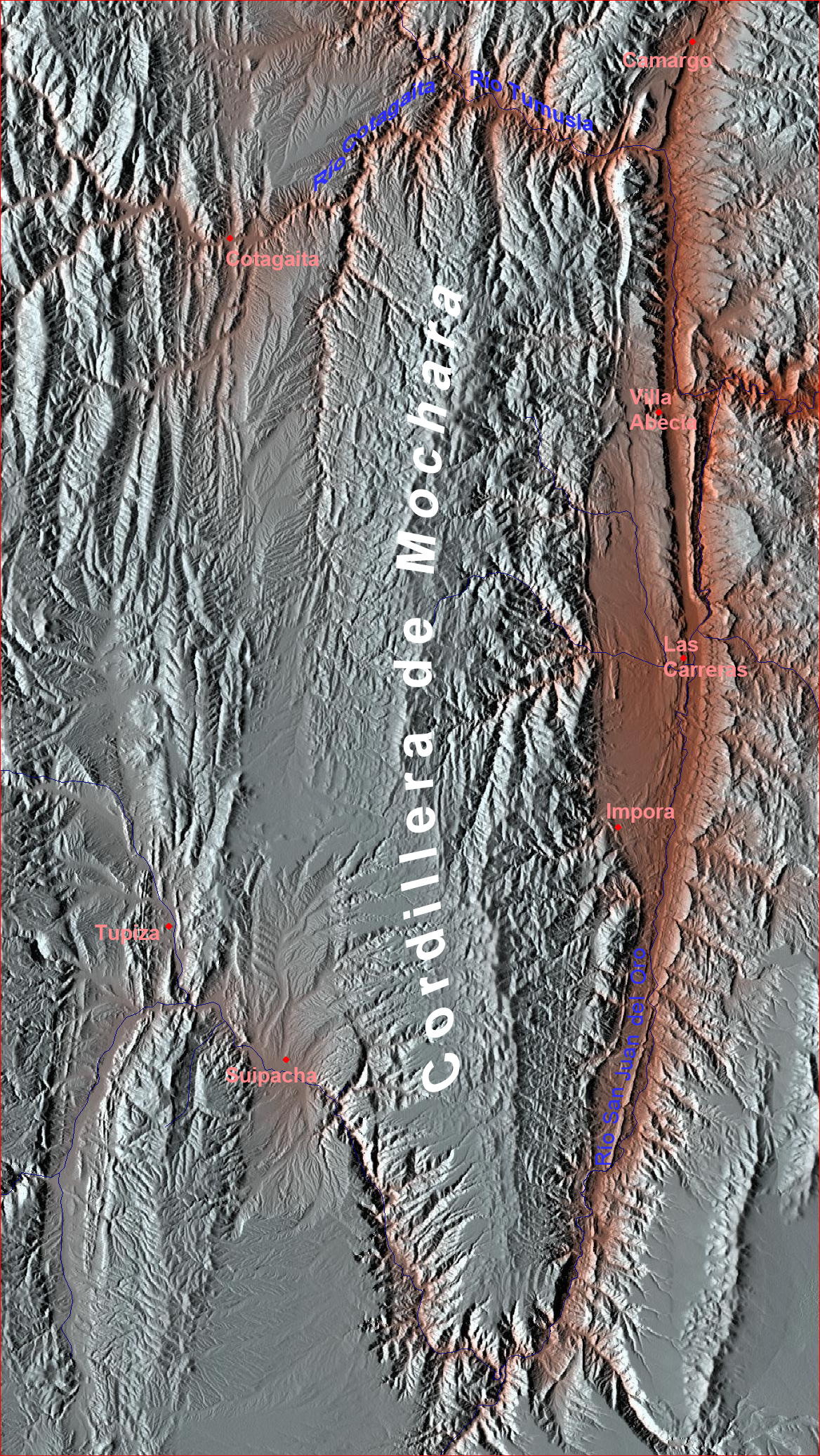
Confluence of the river with Tumusla River south of Camargo

Upstream in the Ocuri Canton, the river is called Churki. Its direction is mainly south west. Chiñi Mayu flows along the village of the same name. After having passed the town Camargo, it receives the name Camargo before joining Tumusla River as a left tributary.

== See also ==
- Cinti Valley
