= Incahuasi, Bolivia =

Incahuasi
- Town
- Location within Bolivia
- Coordinates: 20°35′S 64°55′W
- Country: Bolivia
- Department: Chuquisaca Department
- Province: Nor Cinti Province
- Municipality: Incahuasi Municipality
- Elevation: 9,740 ft (2,970 m)

Population (2024)
  - Total: 16,311
- Time zone: UTC−04:00 (BOT)

Incahuasi is a town and municipality in Bolivia, located in the Nor Cinti Province in the southwest of the Chuquisaca Department. The municipality covers an area of 1,598.03 km² and has a population of 16,311 (according to the 2024 INE Census). The town is 426 km from Sucre, the country's capital, and is connected by road.

The municipality of Incahuasi was created on January 26, 1970, during the government of Alfredo Ovando Candia.

== See also ==
- Cinti Valley
