= Muruq'u (Chuquisaca) =

Mountain in Bolivia

- Location within Bolivia

Highest point
- Elevation: 4,206 m (13,799 ft)
- Coordinates: 20°01′51″S 64°45′54″W

Geography
- Location: Bolivia, Chuquisaca Department
- Parent range: Andes

Muruq'u (Quechua for ball (of yarn, wool), also spelled Morokho) is a 4,206-metre-high (13,799 ft) mountain in the Bolivian Andes. It is located in the Chuquisaca Department, Nor Cinti Province, San Lucas Municipality, east of the village of Canchas Blancas. It lies northwest of Kunturiri.
