= Kimsaqucha =

Kimsaqucha or Kimsa Qucha (Quechua kimsa three, qucha lake, "three lakes", also spelled Quimsacocha, also Kimsacocha, Kimsaqocha, Kinsa Qocha, Kinsaccocha, Kinsacocha, Kinsaqocha, Quimsa Ccocha, Quimsa Khocha, Quimsaccocha, Quimsacocha, Quinsa Khocha, Quinsa Kocha) may refer to:

== Lakes ==
- Kimsaqucha (Lamay), a lake in the Lamay District, Calca Province, Cusco Region, Peru
- Kimsaqucha (Pisac), a lake in the Pisac District, Calca Province, Cusco Region, Peru
- Kimsaqucha (Puno), a lake in the Puno Region, Peru

== Mountain ==
- Kimsa Qucha (Bolivia), a mountain in Bolivia
- Kimsaqucha (Apurímac), a mountain in the Apurímac Region, Peru
