= Qillqata =

Qillqata (Aymara for "written" or "something written", other spellings Kelkhata, Khelkhata, Khellkhata, Killkata, Quelcata, Qellqata, Quellcata, Quellqata, Quelcata, Queljata, Quilcata) may refer to:

- Qillqata or Qala Qala, an archaeological site in the Oruro Department, Bolivia
- Qillqata (Arequipa-Moquegua), a mountain in the Arequipa Region and the Moquegua Region, Peru
- Qillqata (Chuquisaca), a mountain in the Chuquisaca Department, Bolivia
- Qillqata (Cochabamba), a mountain in the Quillacollo Province, Cochabamba Department, Bolivia
- Qillqata (Condesuyos-La Unión), a mountain in the Condesuyos Province and the La Unión Province, Arequipa Region, Peru
- Qillqata (Cusco), a mountain in the Cusco Region, Peru
- Qillqata (La Paz), a mountain in the La Paz Department, Bolivia
- Qillqata (Tapacarí), a mountain in the Tapacarí Province, Cochabamba Department, Bolivia
