= T'uruchipa River =

T'uruchipa
- Etymology: Quechua

Location
- Country: Bolivia
- Region: Potosí Department
- Municipality: José María Linares Province

Physical characteristics
- Mouth: Pillku Mayu
  - location: T'uruchipa Canton

Basin features
- Tributaries
  - left: Q'inqu
  - right: Anawayu

T'uruchipa (Quechua t'uru mud, chipa trap, hispanicized spelling Turuchipa) is a Bolivian river in the Potosí Department, José María Linares Province, Ckochas Municipality, T'uruchipa Canton. It is a right tributary to the Pillku Mayu.

Upstream in the Nor Cinti Province, San Lucas Municipality, the river is called San Lucas. The direction is mainly north east as it flows along the town San Lucas, Uruchini and T'uruchipa until reaching the Pillku Mayu between the villages Urunkuta and Ruphasqa.

== See also ==
- Chiñi Mayu
- Ch'aki Mayu
