= Qillqata (Chuquisaca) =

Mountain in Bolivia

- Location within Bolivia

Highest point
- Elevation: 3,794 m (12,448 ft)
- Coordinates: 20°03′36″S 65°17′00″W

Geography
- Location: Bolivia, Chuquisaca Department
- Parent range: Andes

Qillqata (Aymara qillqaña to write, -ta a suffix, "written" or "something written", also spelled Khelkhata) is a 3,794-metre-high (12,448 ft) mountain in the Bolivian Andes. It is located in the Chuquisaca Department, Nor Cinti Province, San Lucas Municipality, near the border to the Potosí Department, José María Linares Province, Puna Municipality. It lies southeast of Otavi (Utawi).
