= Cotagaita River =

Location
- Country: Bolivia
- Region: Potosí Department, Nor Chichas Province

Physical characteristics
- Source
  - coordinates: 20°36′14″S 65°53′52″W
- Mouth: Tumusla River
  - coordinates: 20°41′28″S 65°25′48″W

The Cotagaita River is a river of Bolivia in the Potosí Department, Nor Chichas Province, Cotagaita Municipality. It is a right affluent of Tumusla River and belongs to the Pillku Mayu river basin..

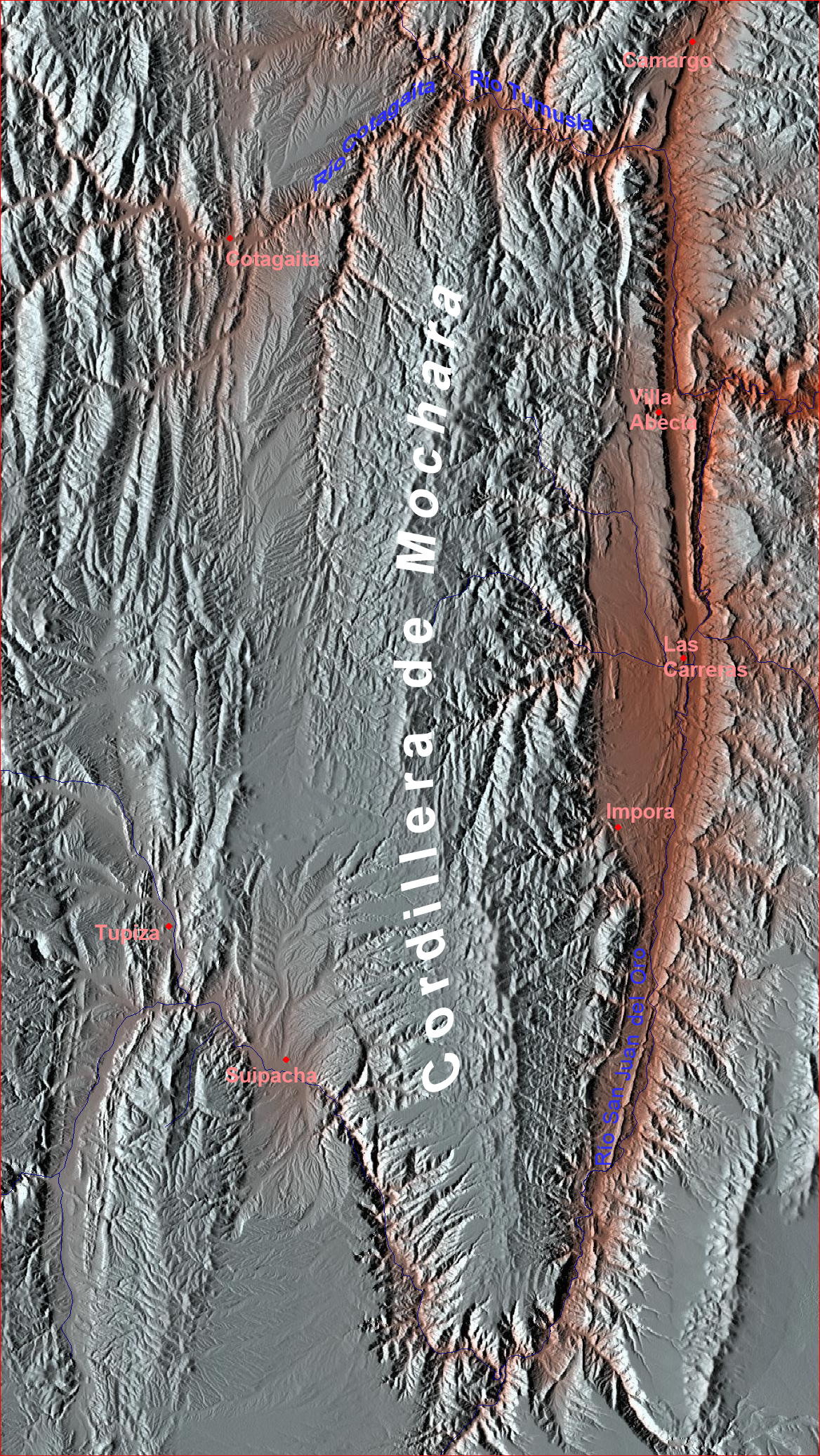
Confluence of Cotagaita River with Tumusla River and confluence of Tumusla River with San Juan del Oro River

== See also ==
- List of rivers of Bolivia
