= Flag of Chuquisaca and Sucre =

Chuquisaca & Sucre
- Use: Civil and state flag
- Adopted: October 1945, 30; 81 years ago (Chuquisaca Department); 2020; 6 years ago (Sucre)

The Bolivian department of Chuquisacau and its capital city, Sucre, use the same flag. It is derived from the colonial banner of the Real Audiencia of Charcas and the Intendancy of Chuquisaca, which later inspired the design of the flag of the Department of Chuquisaca. The flag's design consists of a red Cross of Burgundy, with the Spanish royal crown in its medieval version in the center.The flag's design depicts a red cross of Burgundy, with the Spanish royal crown in its medieval version used by the House of Trastámara in the center.

The flag replaces the national flag in schools in Sucre on the first Monday of September, to commemorate the founding of the city.

== History ==
Old flag of Sucre

Sucre, then called La Plata, received its coat of arms from the viceroy of Peru in 3 March 1559. The original coat of arms featured a white banner with the Jerusalem cross. Although the coat of arms was formally retained after Bolivia's independence, the cross depicted on it has been depicted in various forms over the centuries, and the flag has been used as the city's flag.

The flag with the Burgundy cross was established as the flag of the department of Chuquisaca by prefectural decree on 30 October 1945. In 2019, the city of Sucre passed a symbols law that discontinued the use of the Jerusalem Cross flag. In 2020, another municipal law mandated the use of the existing departmental flag as the city flag.
