= Yungueño =

Bolivian mixed drink

The yungueño is a traditional mixed drink in Bolivia. It is made from a jigger of singani, simple syrup or sugar, and orange juice. The name means that the drink comes from the Yungas, a tropical and very humid region in the valleys of Bolivia inhabited by Afro-Bolivians who created this mix.

Before the arrival of "cocktail culture" in Bolivia, the yungueño was a drink for special occasions among the poor in the Beni, the Bolivian Amazon. It was made with uncut cane alcohol and fresh grapefruit juice, plus as much singani (a Bolivian pomace brandy) as the host of the party could afford. The mix was put into glass gallon jugs and buried to "añejar" (age) it. The result is a surprisingly smooth drink, given the rude nature of its major component, the straight alcohol.

== See also ==
- List of Bolivian Drinks
