= Redención Pampa =

- Town
- Location within Bolivia
- Coordinates: 18°50′S 64°37′W
- Country: Bolivia
- Department: Chuquisaca Department
- Province: Jaime Zudáñez Province
- Municipality: Mojocoya Municipality

Population (2012)
  - Total: 1,966
- Time zone: UTC-4 (BOT)

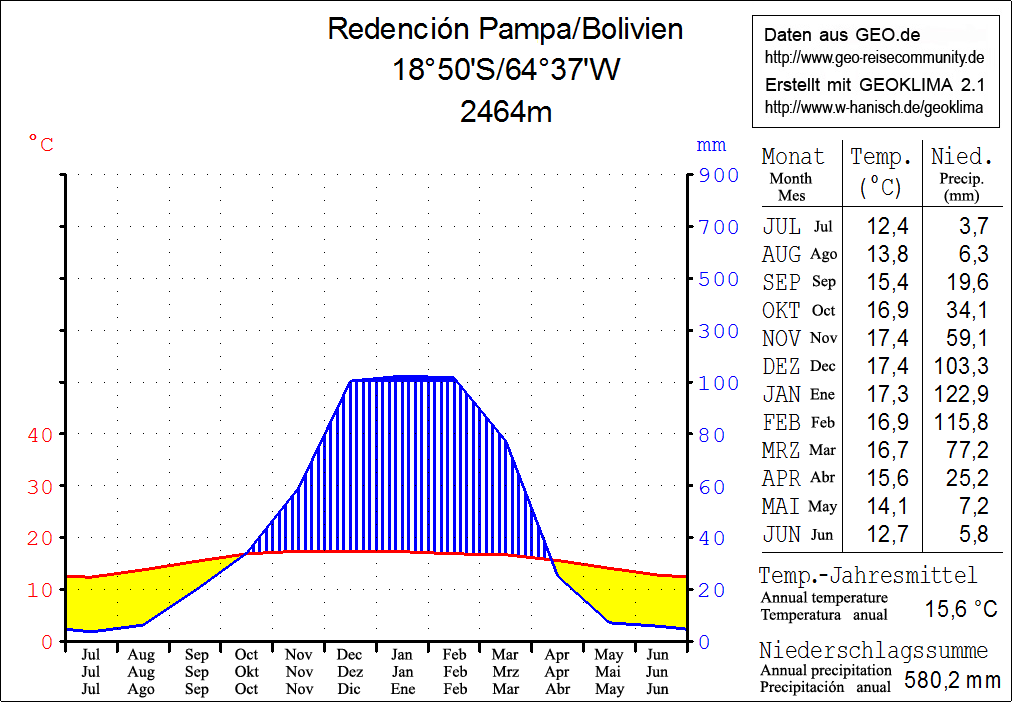
Redencion Pampa climate chart

Redención Pampa is a small town in the Chuquisaca Department of Bolivia.

== Climate ==
Climate data for Redención Pampa, elevation 2,437 m (7,995 ft)
Month	Jan	Feb	Mar	Apr	May	Jun	Jul	Aug	Sep	Oct	Nov	Dec	Year
Mean daily maximum °C (°F)	23.7 (74.7)	23.4 (74.1)	23.5 (74.3)	23.2 (73.8)	23.3 (73.9)	22.9 (73.2)	22.5 (72.5)	23.3 (73.9)	23.8 (74.8)	24.7 (76.5)	24.8 (76.6)	24.3 (75.7)	23.6 (74.5)
Daily mean °C (°F)	17.6 (63.7)	17.5 (63.5)	17.2 (63.0)	16.2 (61.2)	15.2 (59.4)	14.2 (57.6)	13.9 (57.0)	14.6 (58.3)	15.8 (60.4)	17.4 (63.3)	17.9 (64.2)	17.8 (64.0)	16.3 (61.3)
Mean daily minimum °C (°F)	11.6 (52.9)	11.5 (52.7)	10.9 (51.6)	9.3 (48.7)	7.1 (44.8)	5.5 (41.9)	5.3 (41.5)	5.9 (42.6)	7.9 (46.2)	10.0 (50.0)	11.0 (51.8)	11.4 (52.5)	9.0 (48.1)
Average precipitation mm (inches)	116.4 (4.58)	108.3 (4.26)	69.8 (2.75)	25.4 (1.00)	5.0 (0.20)	2.6 (0.10)	1.8 (0.07)	5.2 (0.20)	18.8 (0.74)	27.6 (1.09)	41.4 (1.63)	80.9 (3.19)	503.2 (19.81)
Average precipitation days	10.3	9.3	6.8	2.5	0.6	0.6	0.7	1.1	2.3	3.7	4.6	7.5	50
Average relative humidity (%)	71.9	71.7	73.7	72.7	63.6	59.8	59.4	57.6	61.0	62.8	62.7	70.1	65.6
Source: Servicio Nacional de Meteorología e Hidrología de Bolivia
