= Puka Pampa River =

Puka Pampa
- Etymology: Quechua

Location
- Country: Bolivia
- Region: Chuquisaca Department
- Municipality: Sud Cinti Province

Physical characteristics
- Mouth: Pilaya River
  - coordinates: 21°0′S 64°35′W

Basin features
- Tributaries
  - right: Agua y Castilla River

Puka Pampa River (Quechua puka red, pampa plain, "red plain", also spelled Puca Pampa) is a Bolivian river in the Chuquisaca Department, Sud Cinti Province, Culpina Municipality. It is a left tributary of the Pilaya River, an important right affluent of the Pillku Mayu.

The river flows along the villages of Sala Mayu, Puka Pampa and Taruka Kancha. Its main direction is to the south. About 17 km southeast of the village of Pilaya the Puka Pampa River empties into the Pilaya River which is a natural border between the departments of Chuquisaca and Tarija.

== See also ==
- Cinti Valley
- Inka Wasi River
- List of rivers of Bolivia
