= Yura River (Bolivia) =

Coordinates: 20.1894°S 65.8717°W

- Location within Bolivia

Location
- Country: Bolivia
- Region: Potosí Department, Antonio Quijarro Province

Basin features
- Tributaries
  - left: Tacora, Charara, San Juan
  - right: Tica Tica

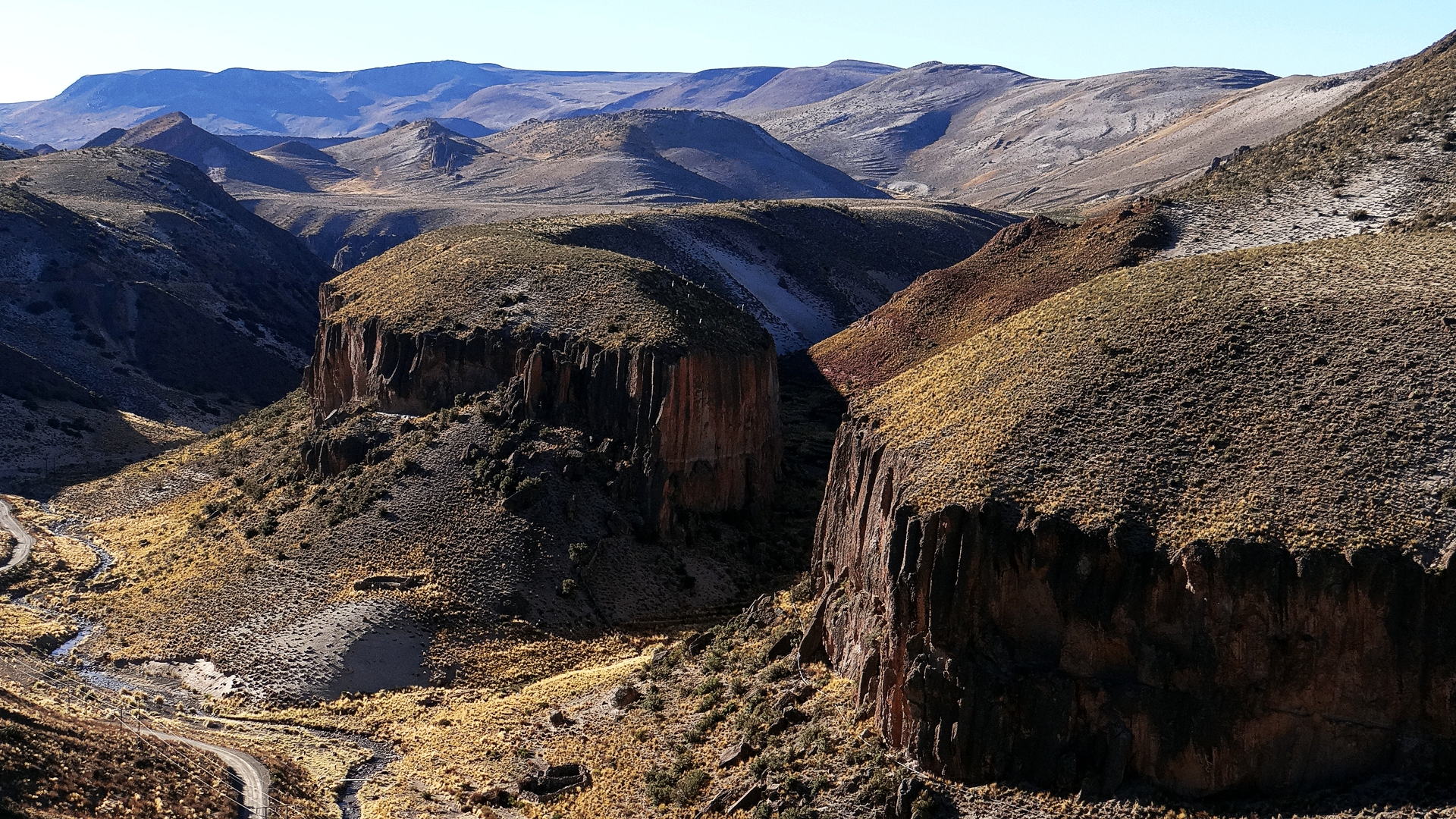

The Yura River is a river of Bolivia in the Potosí Department, Antonio Quijarro Province. Its waters flow to the Pillku Mayu while the river successively receives the names Toropalca, Tumusla, Camblaya and Pilaya. Pilaya River is a right tributary of Pillku Mayu.

The Yura river is dubbed as "Rio Eléctrico" (Electric river) because its importance for hydroelectric generation. Power stations include Kilpani (11,5 MW), Landara (5,2 MW) y Punutuma (2,4 MW) with a total of 19.05 MW. Electric generation started already in 1902 in Landara.

== See also ==
- List of rivers of Bolivia
