= Kimsa Qucha (Bolivia) =

Mountain in Bolivia

- Location within Bolivia

Highest point
- Elevation: 4,040 m (13,250 ft)
- Coordinates: 20°02′33″S 64°56′05″W

Geography
- Location: Bolivia, Chuquisaca Department
- Parent range: Andes

Kimsa Qucha (Quechua kimsa three, qucha lake, "three lakes", also spelled Quimsa Khocha) is a mountain in the Bolivian Andes which reaches a height of approximately 4,040 m (13,250 ft). It is located in the Chuquisaca Department, Nor Cinti Province, San Lucas Municipality.
