= Chuflay =

Bolivian mixed drink

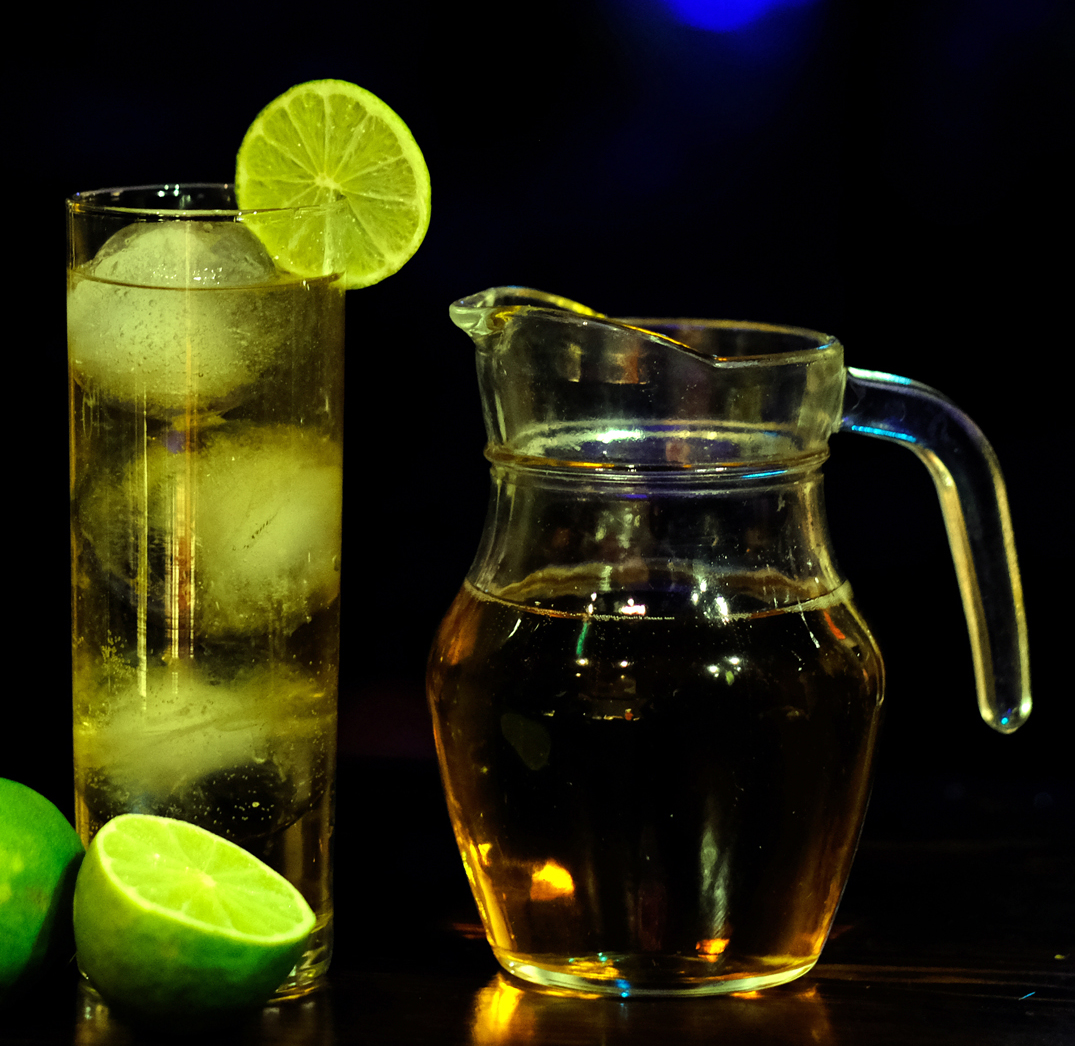
Chuflay

Chuflay is the name of a traditional Bolivian mixed drink. The drink is made on the rocks in a tall glass, such as a Collins glass, with a jigger of singani and filled with either ginger ale, 7-Up, or Sprite and often garnished with a slice of lime. Chuflay is used in special events, i.e. weddings, promotions, etc. This drink is very affordable in most places and is served frequently.

This new combination of singani and ginger ale was called "short fly", a term that in railway slang gives its name to "a temporary rail, usually built around a flooded area, a breakdown or other obstacle". The term used by the English engineers was "Short Fly", a railroad term used to refer to shortcuts, and it was called that way because the drink made them drunk quickly. When the Bolivians heard "Short Fly" they transformed it into "Chuflay".

This analogy was because singani was a temporary replacement for the gin shortage. The name was later Spanishized as "chuflay" by the local populations that came into contact with this drink, which gradually became an emblematic Bolivian beverage.

It is commonly associated with the dice game called cacho. It is consumed in several regions of Bolivia, such as the departments of La Paz, Potosí, Oruro, Cochabamba, Chuquisaca, Santa Cruz and Tarija.

== See also ==
- List of Bolivian Drinks

== Sources ==
Murphy, Alan. Footprint: Bolivia Handbook, Third Edition. Bath: Footprint Handbooks, 2002.
