= Inka Wasi River =

Inka Wasi
- Etymology: Quechua

Location
- Country: Bolivia
- Region: Chuquisaca Department
- Municipality: Nor Cinti Province

Physical characteristics
- Mouth: Pilaya River

Inka Wasi (Quechua inka Inca, wasi house, "Inca house", hispanicized spellings Inca Huasi, Incahuasi) is a Bolivian river in the Chuquisaca Department, Nor Cinti Province. It is a left tributary of the Pilaya River, an important right affluent of the Pillku Mayu.

== See also ==
- List of rivers of Bolivia
- Puka Pampa River
- Tumusla River
