= Culpina =

- Town
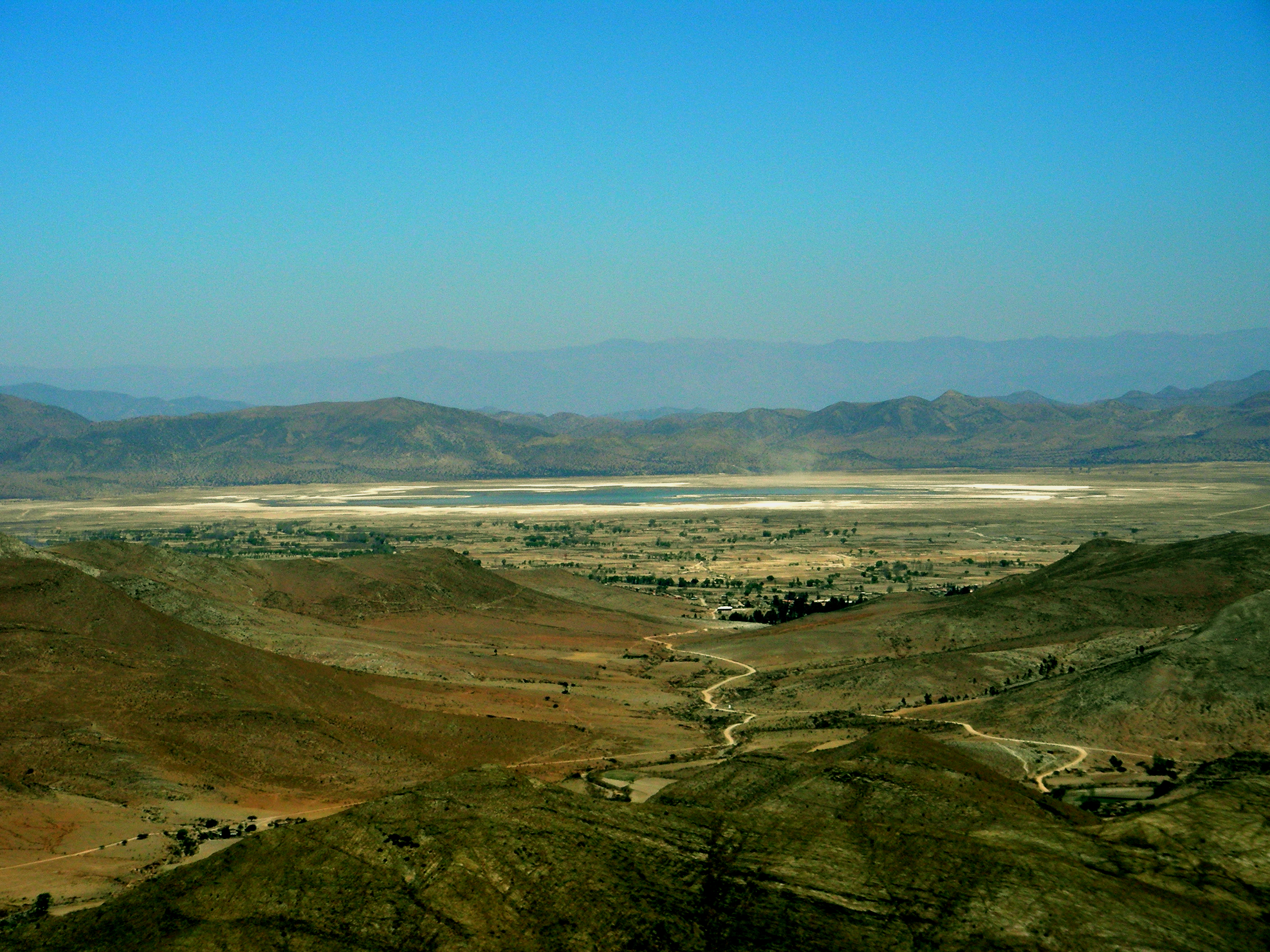
- Interactive map of Culpina
- Coordinates: 20°50′S 64°57′W
- Country: Bolivia
- Department: Chuquisaca Department
- Province: Sud Cinti Province
- Municipality: Culpina Municipality

Population (2001)
  - Total: 2,103
  - Ethnicities: Quechua
- Time zone: UTC-4 (BOT)

Culpina is a small town in Bolivia. In 2010 it had an estimated population of 2,747.

== Climate ==
Climate data for Culpina, elevation 2,970 m (9,740 ft), (1973–2015)
Month	Jan	Feb	Mar	Apr	May	Jun	Jul	Aug	Sep	Oct	Nov	Dec	Year
Record high °C (°F)	31.6 (88.9)	29.5 (85.1)	31.8 (89.2)	30.0 (86.0)	28.0 (82.4)	27.0 (80.6)	29.5 (85.1)	29.0 (84.2)	29.0 (84.2)	31.0 (87.8)	31.0 (87.8)	31.5 (88.7)	31.8 (89.2)
Mean daily maximum °C (°F)	20.6 (69.1)	20.3 (68.5)	20.8 (69.4)	21.5 (70.7)	21.0 (69.8)	20.0 (68.0)	19.8 (67.6)	20.8 (69.4)	21.4 (70.5)	22.0 (71.6)	21.7 (71.1)	21.2 (70.2)	20.9 (69.7)
Daily mean °C (°F)	14.1 (57.4)	13.8 (56.8)	13.8 (56.8)	13.1 (55.6)	10.9 (51.6)	9.7 (49.5)	9.2 (48.6)	10.4 (50.7)	11.6 (52.9)	13.5 (56.3)	13.9 (57.0)	14.2 (57.6)	12.4 (54.2)
Mean daily minimum °C (°F)	7.4 (45.3)	7.0 (44.6)	6.6 (43.9)	4.6 (40.3)	0.9 (33.6)	−0.6 (30.9)	−1.3 (29.7)	0.1 (32.2)	1.8 (35.2)	5.0 (41.0)	6.2 (43.2)	7.1 (44.8)	3.7 (38.7)
Record low °C (°F)	0.0 (32.0)	0.0 (32.0)	−4.0 (24.8)	−12.0 (10.4)	−11.5 (11.3)	−14.0 (6.8)	−15.5 (4.1)	−13.0 (8.6)	−13.8 (7.2)	−8.5 (16.7)	−5.0 (23.0)	−0.5 (31.1)	−15.5 (4.1)
Average precipitation mm (inches)	70.3 (2.77)	62.3 (2.45)	43.1 (1.70)	11.2 (0.44)	1.2 (0.05)	0.7 (0.03)	0.2 (0.01)	1.7 (0.07)	4.7 (0.19)	14.8 (0.58)	20.3 (0.80)	57.1 (2.25)	287.6 (11.34)
Average precipitation days	11.4	10.4	8.2	2.6	0.4	0.2	0.1	0.5	1.1	3.1	5.0	8.4	51.4
Average relative humidity (%)	70.0	69.6	69.8	69.2	69.8	69.8	68.6	68.8	69.5	69.6	69.4	69.8	69.5
Source: Servicio Nacional de Meteorología e Hidrología de Bolivia
