= Villa Abecia =

Coordinates: 20.9744°S 65.2306°W

Villa Abecia / Camataqui
- Town
- Interactive map of Villa Abecia / Camataqui
- Country: Bolivia
- Department: Chuquisaca Department
- Province: Sud Cinti Province
- Municipality: Camataqui Municipality
- Canton: Camataqui Canton

Government
  - Mayor: Adhemar Castro Taborga (2007)

Population (2001)
  - Total: 733
- Time zone: UTC-4 (BOT)

Villa Abecia, also Camataqui, is a small town in Bolivia.
