= Camargo, Chuquisaca =

Camargo
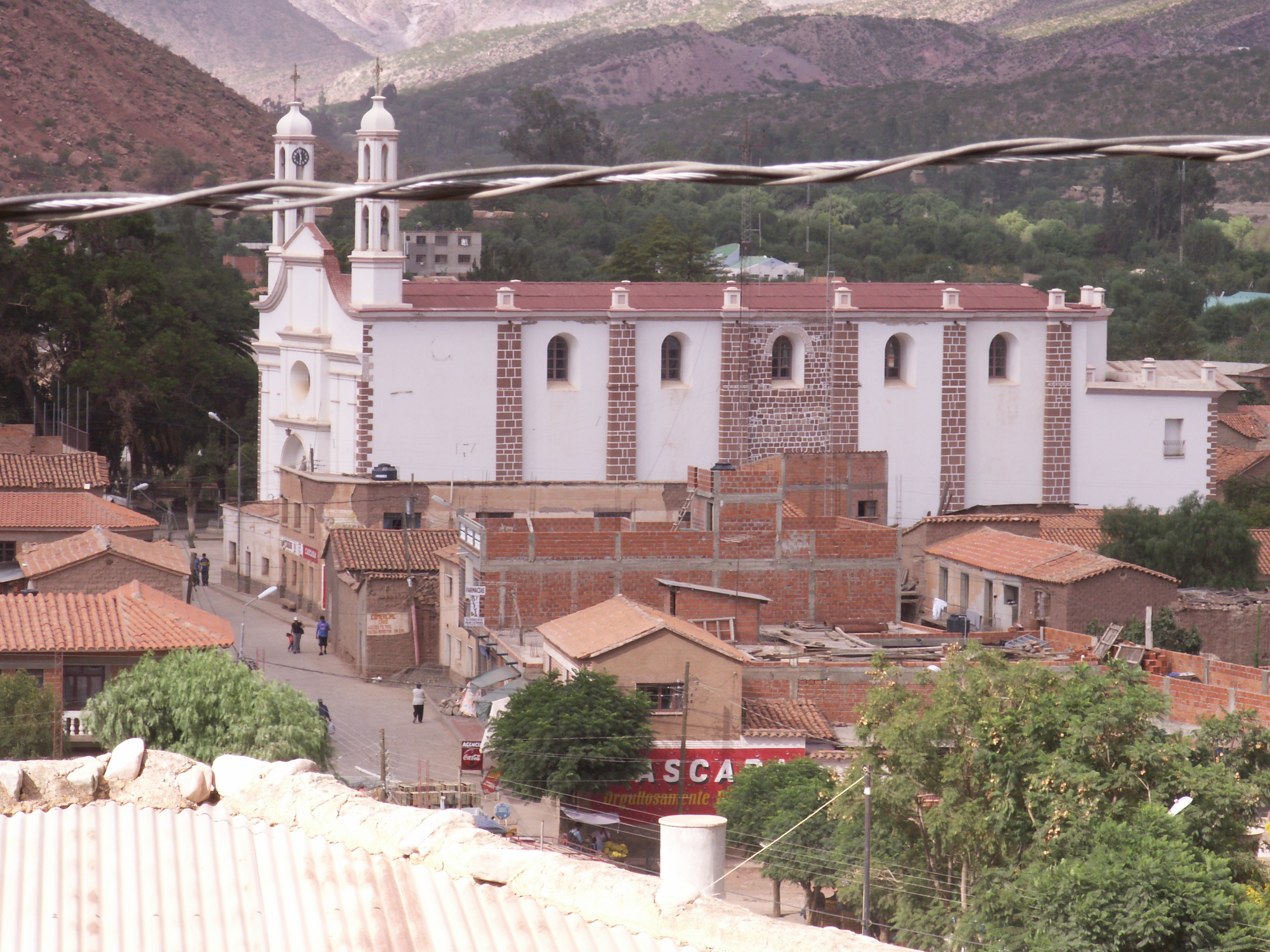

- Location in Bolivia
- Coordinates: 20°38′25″S 65°12′37″W
- Country: Bolivia
- Department: Chuquisaca Department
- Province: Nor Cinti Province

Population (2008)
  - Total: 5,685
- Time zone: UTC-4 (BOT)

Camargo is a small town in the Chuquisaca Department of Bolivia in the South American Andes.

== Location ==
Camargo is the capital of Nor Cinti Province and is situated in Camargo Municipio, embedded between north-southerly mountain ridges, at an elevation of 2,414 m, on the banks of Río Chico which later becomes Río Pilaya.

Camargo is located 350 km south of the department capital Sucre, along Ruta 1, one of Bolivia's major roads which is 1,215 km long and goes from the Peruvian border in the north to the Argentine border in the south. The Camargo family comes from here.

== Population ==
The population of the town has increased by 50% over the past two decades, from 3,789 inhabitants (1992 census) to 4,502 (2001 census) and 5,685 (2008 estimation).

== Climate ==
Climate data for Camargo (San Roque), elevation 2,300 m (7,500 ft), (1975–1999)
Month	Jan	Feb	Mar	Apr	May	Jun	Jul	Aug	Sep	Oct	Nov	Dec	Year
Mean daily maximum °C (°F)	28.0 (82.4)	27.7 (81.9)	27.7 (81.9)	27.2 (81.0)	25.8 (78.4)	24.2 (75.6)	23.5 (74.3)	25.3 (77.5)	26.5 (79.7)	29.3 (84.7)	29.6 (85.3)	29.0 (84.2)	27.0 (80.6)
Daily mean °C (°F)	20.4 (68.7)	20.0 (68.0)	19.8 (67.6)	18.0 (64.4)	14.7 (58.5)	12.7 (54.9)	12.6 (54.7)	14.6 (58.3)	16.7 (62.1)	20.0 (68.0)	21.0 (69.8)	21.2 (70.2)	17.6 (63.8)
Mean daily minimum °C (°F)	12.9 (55.2)	12.4 (54.3)	12.0 (53.6)	8.6 (47.5)	3.6 (38.5)	1.2 (34.2)	1.8 (35.2)	3.9 (39.0)	7.0 (44.6)	10.7 (51.3)	12.5 (54.5)	13.4 (56.1)	8.3 (47.0)
Average precipitation mm (inches)	59.1 (2.33)	67.1 (2.64)	49.4 (1.94)	5.9 (0.23)	0.0 (0.0)	0.1 (0.00)	0.0 (0.0)	2.2 (0.09)	4.5 (0.18)	15.3 (0.60)	32.3 (1.27)	50.7 (2.00)	286.6 (11.28)
Average precipitation days	8.2	8.0	6.4	0.9	0.0	0.0	0.0	0.4	0.6	2.0	4.4	6.4	37.3
Average relative humidity (%)	62.1	61.6	60.5	56.3	50.3	50.0	53.4	53.5	47.6	49.8	53.7	55.6	54.5
Source: Servicio Nacional de Meteorología e Hidrología de Bolivia
