= Nor Cinti Province =

Nor Cinti
- Province
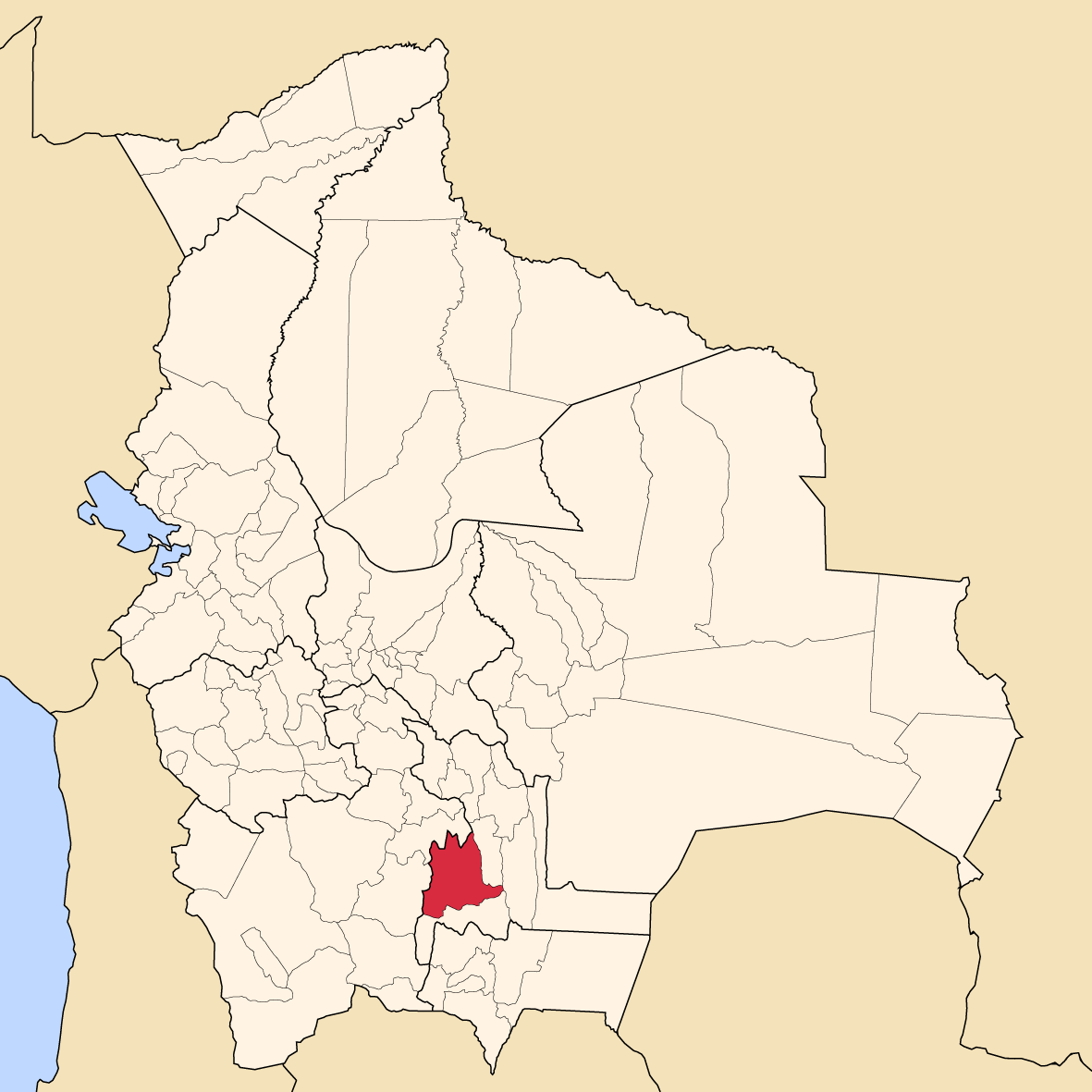
- Location of Nor Cinti Province within Bolivia
- Coordinates: 20°20′00″S 64°55′00″W
- Country: Bolivia
- Department: Chuquisaca Department
- Capital: Camargo

Area
  - Total: 2,962 sq mi (7,671 km^{2})

Population (2024 census)
  - Total: 71,433
  - Density: 24.12/sq mi (9.312/km^{2})
  - Ethnicities: Quechua
- Time zone: UTC-4 (BOT)

Nor Cinti is a province in the Bolivian department of Chuquisaca. Its capital is Camargo.

== Geography ==
One of the highest mountains of the province is Kunturiri at 4,604 m (15,105 ft). Other mountains are listed below:

- Allqamari
- Chawpi Qullu
- Ch'ankha Punta
- Ch'illka
- Inka Kancha
- Jatun Q'asa
- Jatun Urqu
- Kimsa Qucha
- Lara Punta
- Layqa Qucha
- Llaqta Pampa
- Muruq'u
- Puka Urqu
- Qallu Urqu
- Qillqata
- Q'illu Apachita
- Sirka Punta
- Tarujani
- Tarujiri
- Turu Wañusqa
- Wayllaw Q'asa
- Wisk'achani

== Subdivision ==
The province is divided into four municipalities which are further subdivided into cantons.

Section	Municipality	Seat
1st	Camargo Municipality	Camargo
2nd	San Lucas Municipality	San Lucas
3rd	Incahuasi Municipality	Incahuasi
4th	Villa Charcas Municipality	Villa Charcas

== See also ==
- Chiñi Mayu
- Inka Wasi River
- Santa Elena River
- T'uruchipa River
