= Sud Cinti Province =

Sud Cinti
- Province
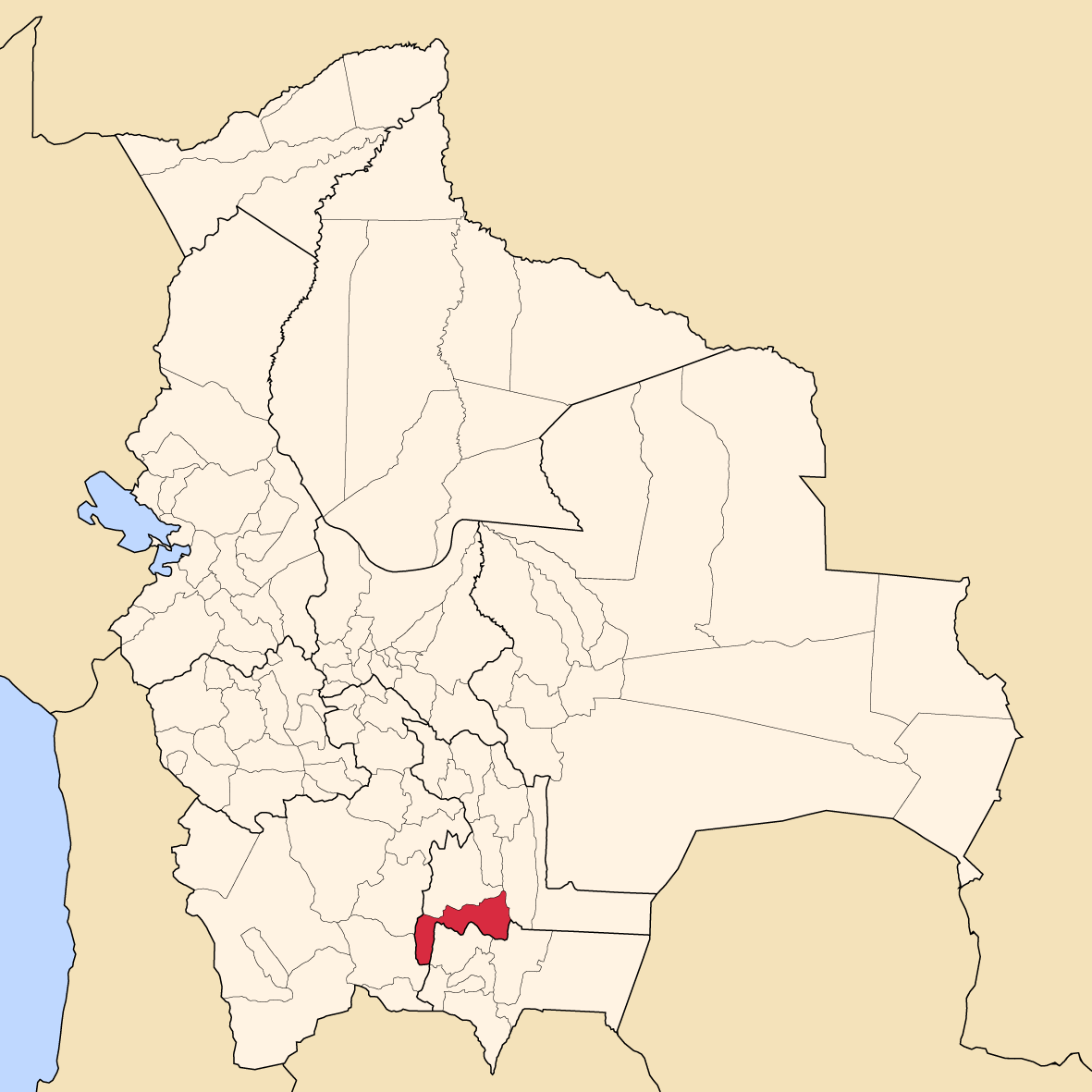
- Location of Sud Cinti Province within Bolivia
- Coordinates: 20.917°S 64.833°W
- Country: Bolivia
- Department: Chuquisaca

Area
  - Total: 5,650 km^{2} (2,180 sq mi)

Population (2024)
  - Total: 25,246
  - Density: 4.47/km^{2} (11.6/sq mi)
- Time zone: UTC-4 (Bolivia Time)

Sud Cinti (also Sur Cinti) is a province in the Bolivian department of Chuquisaca.

== Subdivision ==
The province is divided into three municipalities which are further subdivided into cantons. The municipalities with their seats are:

Section	Municipality	Seat
1st	Camataqui Municipality / Villa Abecia Municipality	Villa Abecia
2nd	Culpina Municipality	Culpina
3rd	Las Carreras Municipality	Las Carreras

== See also ==
- Puka Pampa River
