= Chuquisaca Department =

Department of Bolivia

Coordinates: 20°00′S 64°25′W

Chuquisaca Departamento de Chuquisaca (Spanish) Tetãvore Chuquisaca (Guarani) Chuqichaka suyu (Quechua)
- Department
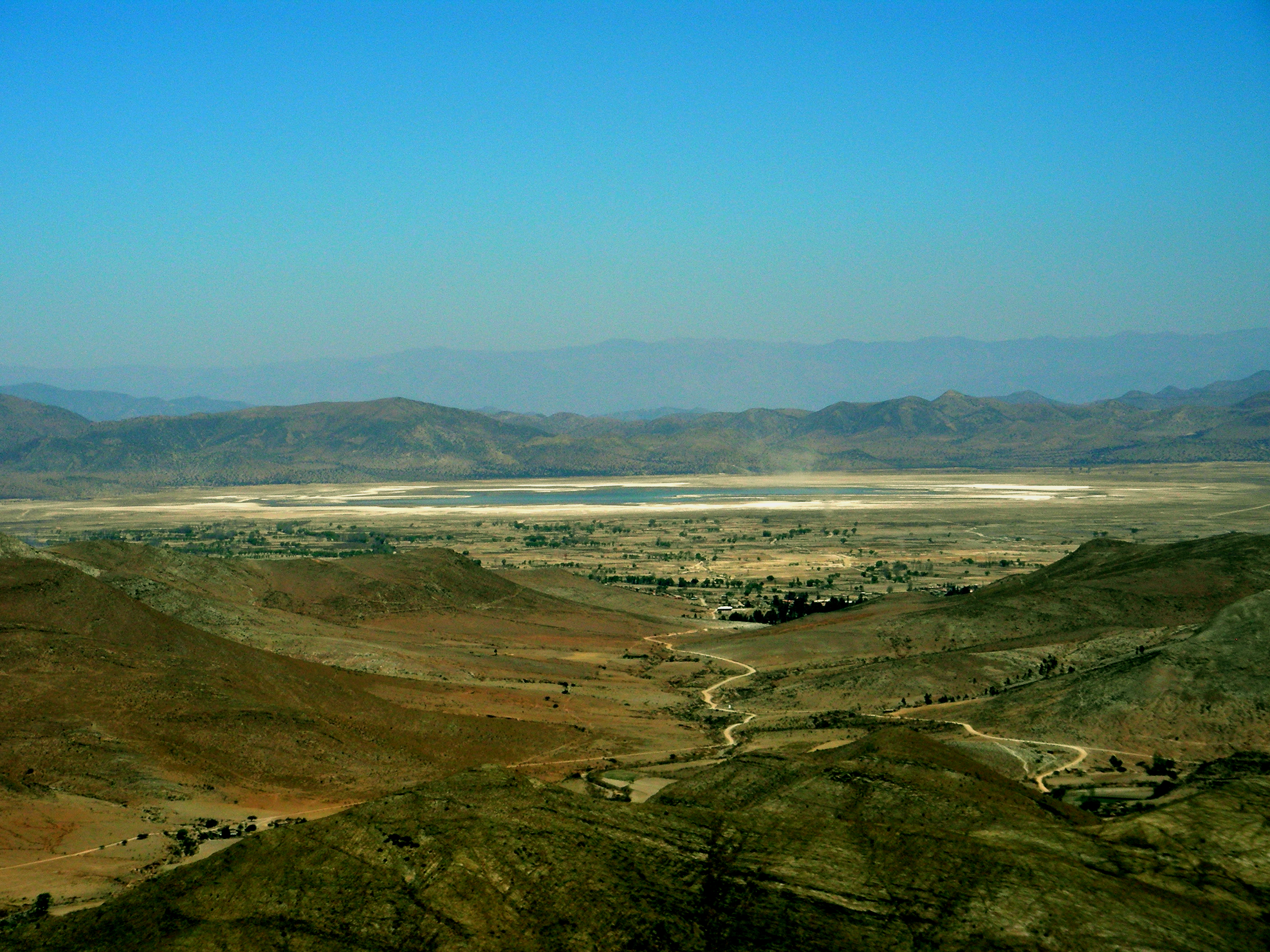
- View of La Laguna Lake

- Flag Coat of arms

- Location within Bolivia
- Country: Bolivia
- Capital: Sucre

Government
  - Body: Departmental Legislative Assembly of Chuquisaca
  - Governor: Damián Condori (CST)

Area
  - Total: 51,524 km^{2} (19,894 sq mi)

Population (2024 census)
  - Total: 600,132
  - Density: 11.648/km^{2} (30.167/sq mi)
- Time zone: UTC-4 (BOT)
- HDI (2019): 0.690 medium · 8th of 9
- ISO 3166-2: BO-H
- GDP (2023): in constant Dollar of 2015
- Total: US$ 1.4 billion Int$ 3.3 billion (PPP)
- Per capita: US$ 2,100; Int$ 5,000 (PPP)
- Website: www.chuquisaca.gob.bo

Chuquisaca (Spanish pronunciation: [tʃukiˈsaka]; Guarani: Chuquisaca; Quechua: Chuqichaka; Aymara: Chuqisaka) is a department of Bolivia located in the center south. It borders on the departments of Cochabamba, Tarija, Potosí, and Santa Cruz. The departmental capital is Sucre, which is also the constitutional capital of Bolivia.

== Geography ==
The department is traversed by the main cordillera of the Andes mountain range and lesser cordilleras. Parts of it lay within the basin of the Amazon River, and other parts within the basin of the Río de La Plata. The surface area of the department is 51,524 square kilometers. The topography of central Chuquisaca consists of a series of ridges rising up to 1500 m that run north and south with flat valleys between the ridges. To the west of these ridges abruptly rise the Andes Mountains to 3000 m forming a prepuna landmass that is cut into by large river valleys that drain into the Amazon or Rio de la Plata river basins. To the east of the central ridges lies a stretch of territory containing low elevation flat Chaco topography. 90% of the land in the department of Chuquisaca has an inclination of 70% or more.

== Demographics ==
Historical population
| Year | Pop. | ±% p.a. |
|---|---|---|
| 1976 | 358,516 | — |
| 1992 | 453,756 | +1.48% |
| 2001 | 531,522 | +1.77% |
| 2012 | 581,347 | +0.82% |
| 2024 | 600,132 | +0.27% |
Source: Citypopulation

== Ecological and vegetation zones ==
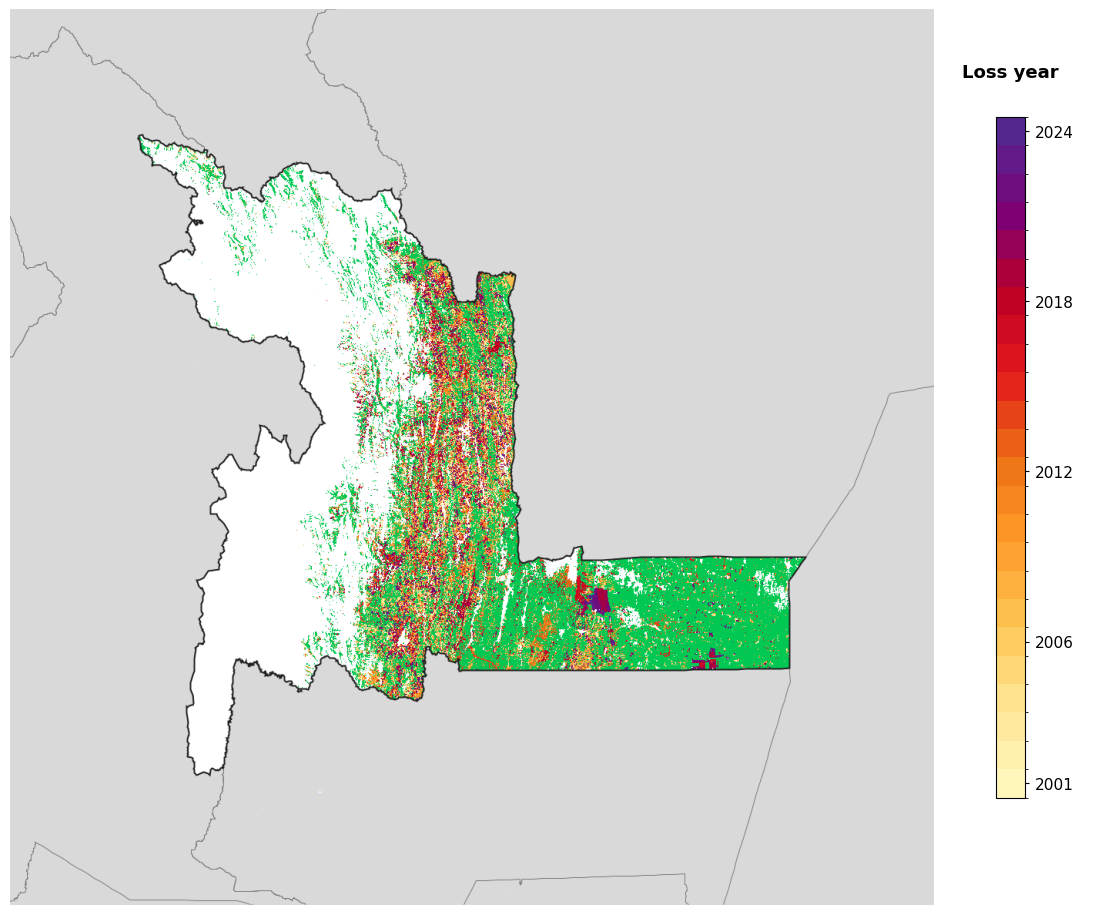
Tree-cover loss year in Chuquisaca, 2001-2024, from the Global Forest Change dataset.

Ecological and vegetation zones in the department of Chuquisaca vary widely according to a diversity of abiotic factors including soil formation and textures, rainfall patterns, and mineral and salinity content of water. Elevation plays an important role in the dispersion of vegetation species and wider ecosystems as they respond to microclimates. As the Andes Mountains became uplifted, plants adapted to dryer and higher microclimates resulting in a high level of speciation especially in the dry forest river valleys of the Bolivian-Tucuman formation. colder and drier air from more austral parts of South America have resulted in migration of plant communities with a floristic connection to those in Argentina, Paraguay and Southern Brazil as opposed to more tropical plant communities that result from warm and moist northern climates. Navarro and Ferreira have developed a database of plant species in Bolivia and identified 39 separate vegetation zones in Bolivia within twelve general physiographic-biogeographical units of which four fall in the boundaries of Chuquisaca Department including: Cordillera Oriental Central y Meridional, Prepuna or High Interandean Valleys, Bolivian-Tucuman Formation, and Chaco. Using Navarro and Ferreira's categories and descriptions based on vegetation zones, the geographical and ecological characteristics of the Chuquisaca Department can be described as follows.

Cordillera Oriental Central y Meridional. From an elevation of 3200m in Chuquisaca to nearly 6000 meters in Potosi, this zone is characterized by the puna, altoandean, and subnival and nival ecological zones with a pluviestacional subhumid bioclimate.

Prepuna or High Interandean Valley. From 2300m to 3200m, this zone is characterized by a mesotropical dry xeric bioclimatic zone. Seasonally torrential waters and salinity levels affect regional vegetation patterns in this zone.

Bolivian-Tucuman Formation. With a wide elevation range between 600m to 3900m this zone contains pluviestacional subhumid and locally humid bioclimatic zones. The high elevation Rio Grande and Pilcomayo river valleys transect this unit and are characterized by dry xeric vegetation zones with endemic and varied speciation especially in the Rio Grande river valley and vegetation influence from the Chaco in the Pilcomayo river valley. Wet forest ecosystems like those found in more northern Yungas valleys are found on high ridges where clouds form.

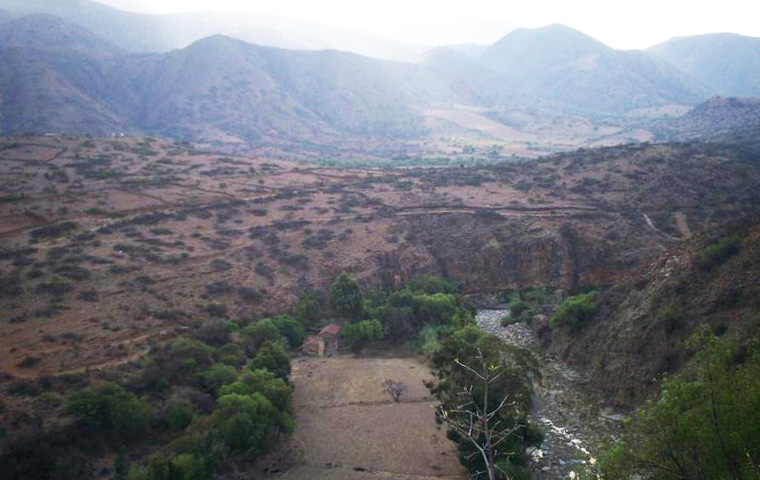
Xeric River Valley near Presto, Bolivia

Chaco: from 400 to 900 m this unit is characterized by a xeric bioclimate. Sandy soils in this unit were formed from alluvial processes from the Parapeti and Grande rivers. Soil drainage affects vegetation dispersion within this unit.

== Human Ecological Impacts ==
With a human population of 631,000 people humans are a part of the ecology of Chuquisaca. The grazing of cattle and introduction of invasive feral citrus trees has affected the native plant populations in the department. Native forests and ecosystems have contracted as land has been converted to pasture and erosion is widespread as a result of human agricultural activities on steep slopes.

== Government ==
=== Executive offices ===
The chief executive office of Bolivia departments (since May 2010) is the governor; until then, the office was called the prefect, and until 2006 the prefect was appointed by the president of Bolivia. The current governor, Damián Condori Herrera, member of the CST, was elected on 7 March 2021.

| Took office | Office expired | Prefect/Governor | Party | Notes |
|---|---|---|---|---|
| 23 Jan 2006 | 30 Aug 2007 | David Sánchez Heredia | MAS-IPSP | First elected prefect. Elected in Bolivian general election, December 2005; Resigns temporarily amid city-countryside tensions. |
| 30 Aug 2007 | 20 Sep 2007 | Adrián Valeriano (acting) | MAS-IPSP | |
| 20 Sep 2007 | 18 Dec 2007 | David Sanchez Heredia | MAS-IPSP | Fled the department (24 Nov), and later the country (4 Dec), following the deaths of three civic movement protesters during a disputed session of the Bolivian Constituent Assembly. Resigned in exile. |
| 18 Dec 2007 | 11 Jul 2008 | Ariel Iriarte (interim) | MAS-IPSP | |
| 11 Jul 2008 | 30 May 2010 | Sabina Cuéllar Leaños | ACI | Elected in special election on 29 June 2008; final prefect |
| 30 May 2010 | 26 Dec 2014 | Esteban Urquizu Cuéllar | MAS-IPSP | Elected in the regional election on 4 April 2010; first governor. |
| 26 Dec 2014 | 31 May 2015 | Jaime Cárdenas Mendieta (interim) | MAS-IPSP | |
| 31 May 2015 | 23 Nov 2019 | Esteban Urquizu Cuéllar | MAS-IPSP | Re-elected in the regional election on 29 March 2015. |
| 23 Nov 2019 | 2 Jan 2020 | Efraín Balderas Chávez (acting) | MAS-IPSP | |
| 2 Jan 2020 | 25 Mar 2020 | Víctor Hugo Sánchez Morales (acting) | MAS-IPSP | |
| 25 Mar 2020 | 3 May 2021 | Efraín Balderas Chávez (interim) | MAS-IPSP | |
| 3 May 2021 | | Damián Condori Herrera | CST | Elected in the regional election on 7 March 2021. |
Source: worldstatesmen.org

=== Legislative Assembly ===
Under the 2009 Constitution, each Bolivian department has an elected Departmental Legislative Assembly. The first elections were held 4 April 2010. The majority party in the twenty-one member assembly after the first election was held by the Movement towards Socialism (MAS-IPSP) with 15 seats. Four seats were held by We Are All Chuquisaca. Two seats were selected by the Guaraní people through usos y costumbres.

The last elections to the Departmental Legislative Assembly took place on 1 March 2021 for seats reserved for the Guaraní people and 7 March for the regular seats. The current executive committee, elected on 28 April 2022, consists of Santos Ricardo Carnicel Serrano as president, Evert Cruz Quiroga as first vice-president, Janeth Rocio Blanco Martínez as second vice-president, Juan Cuellar as first secretary and Anastacio Flores Pinto as second secretary.

=== Provinces ===
The department is divided into 10 provinces which are further subdivided into municipalities and cantons.

| Name | Population (2012 census) | Area km^{2} | Capital | |
|---|---|---|---|---|
| Oropeza | 286,140 | 3.943 | Sucre | 1 |
| Azurduy | 23,872 | 4,185 | Azurduy | 6 |
| Zudáñez | 39,992 | 3,738 | Presto | 3 |
| Tomina | 35,192 | 3,947 | Padilla | 5 |
| Hernando Siles | 32,398 | 5,473 | Monteagudo | 9 |
| Yamparáez | 26,577 | 1,472 | Tarabuco | 2 |
| Nor Cinti | 76,477 | 7,983 | Camargo | 7 |
| Sud Cinti | 25,207 | 5,484 | Villa Abecia | 8 |
| Belisario Boeto | 11,159 | 2,000 | Villa Serrano | 4 |
| Luis Calvo | 19,139 | 13,299 | Villa Vaca Guzmán (Muyupampa) | 10 |

== History ==
The native inhabitants were the Charcas, who were dispersed along riverbanks and lowlands. Their leaders, jampiris, sorcerers, and priests resided in the capital, Choque-Chaca, which according to 17th century chronicles had a population of several thousand.

The eastern lowlands of the department, where the autonomous Ava Guarani resided, started a gradual but forcefull incorporation to the Bolivian state in the 1850s. The non-indigenous settlement in eastern Chuquisaca was motivated by an expansion of cattle ranching leading contributing to the conflict between settlers and the maize-farming Ava Guaraní to assume aspects of a farmer–herder conflict. A major Ava Guaraní uprising took place in 1874 and a final military defeat came in 1892. Aniceto Arce and other wealthy Bolivians gained control of lands of the defeated Ava Guaraní in the late 19th century establsining large cattle farming operations. Much of the cattle raised in eastern Chuquisaca was exported to Salta in Argentina and then across the Andes to the saltpeter works in Chile's Atacama Desert. Given the massivity of the cattle estates established Franciscan friar Angélico Martarelli argued around 1890 that the Chiriguano lands had been colonized by cattle rather than by settlers.

=== Sucre ===
Sucre (elev. 2750 m) is called the city of the four names, each name corresponding to a different period of its history. It was founded by the Spaniard Pedro de Anzures in 1538. It thrived due to its regional proximity to the famous silver mines of Potosi, and as Charcas served as capital of the Real Audiencia de Charcas, encompassing all of current Bolivia's territory and more. Reverting to its native name of Chuquisaca, it was the Upper Peru's chief administrative center and largest city. It was there that the first public call for independence from Spain took place, on May 25, 1809, and where the Act of Independence from Spanish rule was signed on August 6, 1825. It was immediately designated the capital of independent Bolivia, under the auspices of Simon Bolivar and Antonio Jose de Sucre. Years later, the city of Chuquisaca was renamed Sucre in honor of the Venezuelan-born hero of South America's independence, who had served as the first effective administrator of the country (and second president).

When the center of political and economic power shifted north, to the tin-producing regions of Oruro and La Paz, Sucre's importance waned, leading to the displacement of the legislative and executive powers to La Paz. However, in honor of Sucre's historical preponderance, the judicial branch (Supreme Court) continues to operate there, and the city's official status as capital of the country was never revoked.

== Languages ==
The languages spoken in the department are mainly Spanish and Quechua. The following table shows the number of those belonging to the recognized group of speakers.

| Language | Department | Bolivia |
|---|---|---|
| Quechua | 298,050 | 2,281,198 |
| Aymara | 4,308 | 1,525,321 |
| Guaraní | 8,330 | 62,575 |
| Another native | 145 | 49,432 |
| Spanish | 376,071 | 6,821,626 |
| Foreign | 8,840 | 250,754 |
| Only native | 122,401 | 960,491 |
| Native and Spanish | 185,598 | 2,739,407 |
| Spanish and foreign | 190,599 | 4,115,751 |

== Places of interest ==
- El Palmar Integrated Management Natural Area

== Villages and towns ==
- Alcalá, Tomina
- Redención Pampa

== Notable people ==
- Isabel Calvimontes (1790-1855), one of the Patricias Argentinas
- María Guadalupe Cuenca (1790-1854), 19th-century letter writer

== See also ==
- Provinces of Bolivia
- Oroncota, Yampara settlement and Inca fortress
