= Yana Urqu =

Yana Urqu or Yana Urku (Quechua yana black, urqu mountain, Kichwa urku, "black mountain", also spelled Yana Orcco, Yana Orco, Yana Orjo, Yana Orkho, Yanahurco, Yanaorcco, Yanaorco, Yanaorjo, Yanaorgo, Yanaurco, Yanaurcu, Yana-Urcu, Yana-urcu) may refer to:

- Yana Urqu (Alis-Laraos), a mountain on the border of the districts of Alis and Laraos in the Yauyos Province, Lima Region, Peru
- Yana Urqu (Apurímac), a mountain in the Apurímac Region, Peru
- Yana Urqu (Calca), a mountain in the Calca District, Calca Province, Cusco Region, Peru
- Yana Urqu (Canas-Canchis), a mountain on the border of the Canas Province and the Canchis Province, Cusco Region, Peru
- Yana Urqu (Canchis), a mountain in the Canchis Province, Cusco Region, Peru
- Yana Urqu (Carrasco), a mountain in the Carrasco Province, Cochabamba Department, Bolivia
- Yana Urqu (Castrovirreyna), a mountain in the Castrovirreyna Province, Huancavelica Region, Peru
- Yana Urqu (Chapi Urqu), a mountain near Chapi Urqu in the Huachocolpa District, Huancavelica Province, Huancavelica Region, Peru
- Yana Urqu (Chayanta), a mountain in the Potosí Department, Chayanta Province, Ravelo Municipality, Bolivia
- Yana Urqu (Chinchihuasi-Cosme), a mountain on the border of the districts of Chinchihuasi and Cosme, Churcampa Province, Huancavelica Region, Peru
- Yana Urqu (Coris-Locroja), a mountain on the border of the districts of Coris and Locroja, Churcampa Province, Huancavelica Region, Peru
- Yanaurcu (Ecuador), a volcano in Ecuador
- Yana Urqu (Hapu Punta), a mountain near Hapu Punta in the Marcapata District, Quispicanchi Province, Cusco Region, Peru
- Yana Urqu (Huancavelica), a mountain in the Huachocolpa District, Huancavelica Province, Huancavelica Region, Peru
- Yana Urqu (Jaqhichuwa), a mountain near Jaqhichuwa in the Marcapata District, Quispicanchi Province, Cusco Region, Peru
- Yana Urqu (Junín), a mountain in the Junín Region, Peru
- Yana Urqu (Lares), a mountain in the Lares District, Calca Province, Cusco Region, Peru
- Yana Urqu (Lima), a mountain in the Laraos District, Yauyos Province, Lima Region, Peru
- Yana Urqu (Linares), a mountain in the José María Linares Province, Potosí Department, Bolivia
- Yana Urqu (Mizque), a mountain in the Mizque Province, Cochabamba Department, Bolivia
- Yana Urqu (Mullu P'unqu), a mountain near Mullu P'unqu in the Marcapata District, Quispicanchi Province, Cusco Region, Peru
- Yana Urqu (Ocongate-Quiquijana), a mountain on the border of the Ocongate District and the Quiquijana District, Quispicanchi Province, Cusco Region, Peru
- Yana Urqu (Puno), a mountain in the Puno Region
- Yana Urqu (Q'umirqucha), a mountain near Q'umirqucha in the Marcapata District, Quispicanchi Province, Cusco Region, Peru
- Yana Urqu (Sud Lípez), a mountain in the Sud Lípez Province, Potosí Department, Bolivia
- Yana Urqu (Urubamba), a mountain in the Urubamba Province, Cusco Region, Peru
- Yana Urqu (Yayamari), a mountain near Yayamari in the Marcapata District, Quispicanchi Province, Cusco Region, Peru
