= Q'umir Qucha (disambiguation) =

Q'umir Qucha or Q'umirqucha (Quechua q'umir green, qucha lake, "green lake", also spelled Ccomer Cocha, Ccomer Ccocha, Ccomercocha, Ccomerccocha, Comer Cocha, Comerccocha, Comercocha, Jomer Cocha, Jomercocha, Jomerjocha, Khomer Khocha, Qomerqocha) may refer to:

== Lakes ==
- Q'umir Qucha (Bolivia), a lake in Bolivia
- Q'umirqucha (Camanti), a lake in the Camanti District, Quispicanchi Province, Cusco Region, Peru.
- Q'umirqucha (Ocongate), a lake in the Ocongate District, Quispicanchi Province, Cusco Region, Peru
- Q'umirqucha (Q'umir Qucha), a lake near Q'umir Qucha in the Marcapata District, Quispicanchi Province, Cusco Region, Peru
- Q'umirqucha (Yanaq Qusqu K'uchu), a lake near Yanaq Qusqu K'uchu in the Marcapata District, Quispicanchi Province, Cusco Region, Peru

== Mountains ==
- Mount Q'umir Qucha (Bolivia), a mountain in Bolivia
- Q'umirqucha (Canchis), a mountain in the Pitumarca District, Canchis Province, Cusco Region, Peru
- Q'umirqucha (Checacupe), a mountain in the Checacupe District, Canchis Province, Cusco Region, Peru
