= Wak'ani (Potosí) =

Mountain in Bolivia

- Location within Bolivia

Highest point
- Coordinates: 19°37′11″S 65°40′28″W

Geography
- Location: Bolivia; Potosí Department
- Parent range: Andes, Khari Khari mountain range

Wak'ani (Aymara wak'a girdle, -ni a suffix to indicate ownership, "the one with a girdle", hispanicized spelling Huacani) is a mountain in the Khari Khari mountain range in the Andes of Bolivia. It is situated in the Potosí Department, Tomás Frías Province, east of Potosí. Wak'ani lies south and south-west of the mountains Khari Khari and Kimsa Waylla, north-west of the mountain Illimani and south-east of the Khari Khari Lakes.
