= Queljata (Cusco) =

Mountain in Peru

- Location within Peru

Highest point
- Elevation: 4,800 m (15,700 ft)
- Coordinates: 13°37′59″S 71°02′42″W

Geography
- Location: Peru, Cusco Region
- Parent range: Andes, Vilcanota

Queljata (possibly from Aymara qillqaña to write, -ta a suffix to indicate the participle, "written" or "something written") is a mountain in the eastern extensions Vilcanota mountain range in the Andes of Peru, about 4,800 metres (15,748 ft) high. It is located in the Cusco Region, Quispicanchi Province, Marcapata District. Queljata lies northeast of the peaks of Quinsachata, Quehuesiri and Huayruruni.
