= Jatun Q'asa (Potosí) =

Mountain in Bolivia

- Location within Bolivia

Highest point
- Elevation: 5,023 m (16,480 ft)
- Coordinates: 19°39′56″S 65°39′26″W

Geography
- Location: Bolivia, Potosí Department
- Parent range: Andes, Khari Khari mountain range

Jatun Q'asa (Quechua jatun, hatun big, great, q'asa mountain pass, "great mountain pass", Hispanicized spelling Jatún Casa) is a mountain in the Khari Khari mountain range of the Bolivian Andes, about 5,023 m (16,480 ft) high. It is located in the Potosí Department, Tomás Frías Province, Potosí Municipality. It lies north of the plain called Jatun Molino Pampa and the Sip'uruni River. Jatun Q'asa lies near Q'illu Q'asa, Q'illu Urqu and Yuraq Yuraq.
