= Chiriunuyoc =

Mountain in Peru

- Location within Peru

Highest point
- Elevation: 4,800 m (15,700 ft)
- Coordinates: 13°39′11″S 71°04′51″W

Naming
- Language of name: Quechua

Geography
- Location: Peru, Cusco Region, Quispicanchi Province
- Parent range: Andes, Vilcanota

Chiriunuyoc (possibly from Quechua chiri cold, unu water, -yuq a suffix to indicate ownership, "the one with cold water") is a mountain in the Vilcanota mountain range in the Andes of Peru, about 4,800 metres (15,748 ft) high. It is situated in the Cusco Region, Quispicanchi Province, Marcapata District, east of the lake Singrenacocha. Chiriunuyoc lies northwest of the mountains Aquichua, Quinsachata and Quehuesiri.
