= Ch'aki Qucha =

Mountain in Bolivia

- Location within Bolivia

Highest point
- Elevation: 4,628 m (15,184 ft)
- Coordinates: 19°44′08″S 65°35′30″W

Geography
- Location: Bolivia, Potosí Department, José María Linares Province
- Parent range: Andes, Potosí mountain range

Ch'aki Qucha (Quechua ch'aki dry, qucha lake, "dry lake", also spelled Chaqui Khocha) is a 4,628-metre-high (15,184 ft) mountain in the Potosí mountain range in the Bolivian Andes at a lake of the same name. It is located in the Potosí Department, José María Linares Province, in the west of the Puna Municipality. Ch'aki Qucha lies south of the mountain Kuntur Ikiña, northeast of Kunturiri and a lake named T'ala Qucha and southeast of Jatun Kunturiri.

The lake named Ch'aki Qucha is northwest of the mountain at 19°43′52″S 65°36′20″W.
