= P'ukru (Bolivia) =

Mountain in Bolivia

- Location within Bolivia

Highest point
- Elevation: 4,768 m (15,643 ft)
- Coordinates: 19°49′38″S 65°41′35″W

Geography
- Location: Bolivia, Potosí Department
- Parent range: Andes, Potosí mountain range

P'ukru (Quechua for hole, pit, gap in a surface, also spelled Phujro) or Phujru (Aymara for hole or pit in the earth without water, not very deep) is a 4,768-metre-high (15,643 ft) mountain in the Potosí mountain range in the Bolivian Andes. It is situated in the Potosí Department, Tomás Frías Province, in the south of the Potosí Municipality. P'ukru lies southwest of Khunurana and a mountain named Q'umir Qucha.
