= Qullpa Qaqa (disambiguation) =

Qullpa Qaqa (Quechua qullpa salty, salpeter, qaqa rock, "salpeter rock", hispanicized spellings Collpacaca, Collpacaja, Colpajaja, Jollpajaja, Jolpajaja) may refer to:

- Qullpa Qaqa, a mountain in the Melgar Province, Puno Region, Peru
- Qullpa Qaqa (Cusco-Puno), a mountain on the border of the Cusco Region and the Puno Region, Peru
- Qullpa Qaqa (Huch'uy Ananta), a mountain near Huch'uy Ananta in the Marcapata District, Quispicanchi Province, Cusco Region, Peru
- Qullpa Qaqa (Marcapata), a mountain in the Marcapata District, Quispicanchi Province, Cusco Region, Peru
