= Quri Pukara =

Mountain in Peru

- Location within Peru

Highest point
- Elevation: 4,605 m (15,108 ft)
- Coordinates: 13°38′47″S 70°46′12″W

Geography
- Location: Peru, Cusco Region
- Parent range: Andes

Quri Pukara (Quechua quri gold, pukara fortress, "gold fortress", Hispanicized spelling Jori Pucara) is a 4,605-metre-high (15,108 ft) mountain in the Andes of Peru. It is situated in the Cusco Region, Quispicanchi Province, Marcapata District. Quri Pukara lies south of Wisk'achani.
