= Chachacumani (Quispicanchi) =

Mountain in Peru

- Location within Peru

Highest point
- Elevation: 5,100 m (16,700 ft)
- Coordinates: 13°45′20″S 70°50′29″W

Geography
- Location: Peru, Cusco Region
- Parent range: Andes, Vilcanota

Chachacumani (possibly from Quechua chachakuma a medical plant, -ni an Aymara suffix to indicate ownership, "the one with the chachakuma plant) is a mountain in the Vilcanota mountain range in the Andes of Peru, about 5,100 metres (16,732 ft) high. It is located in the Cusco Region, Quispicanchi Province, Marcapata District. It lies northeast of Ananta. The Pucamayu (possibly from Quechua for "red river") which downstream is named Sayapata flows along its western slope.
