= Q'umir Qucha (Bolivia) =

Lake in Bolivia

- Location within Bolivia Location within South America
- Interactive map of Q'umir Qucha
- Location: Bolivia, Potosí Department
- Coordinates: 19°47′20″S 65°39′35″W
- Primary outflows: Q'umir Qucha River
- Max. length: 0.24 km (0.15 mi)
- Max. width: 0.17 km (0.11 mi)

Q'umir Qucha (Quechua q'umir green, qucha lake, "green lake", hispanicized spelling Khomer Khocha) is a small artificial lake in Bolivia south east of Potosí. It is about 0.24 km long and 0.17 km at its widest point. The lake is part of the river basin of the upper Pillku Mayu.

Q'umir Qucha is situated in the Anta Q'awa mountain range, the southern part of the Potosí mountain range in the Potosí Department in the north of the José María Linares Province. It lies east of the mountain Q'umir Qucha, north-west of Khunurana and north-east of the larger lake Santa Catalina.

Near Q'umir Qucha in the east there is a slightly smaller lake named Muyu Qucha. Both lakes drain to Santa Catalina Lake, Q'umir Qucha via Q'umir Qucha River and Muyu Qucha via Muyu Qucha River. Santa Catalina Lake drains to Juk'ucha River. This river flows in a mainly south-eastern direction towards the village Tuktapari. Here the river is called Pila Mayu. About 10 km south-east of Tuktapari Pila Mayu empties into Witichi River, a left tributary of Tumusla River.

== See also ==
- Yana Urqu
