= Pisquioc =

Mountain in Peru

- Location within Peru

Highest point
- Elevation: 5,000 m (16,000 ft)
- Coordinates: 13°42′07″S 70°59′17″W

Geography
- Location: Peru, Cusco Region, Quispicanchi Province, Marcapata District
- Parent range: Andes, Vilcanota

Pisquioc (possibly from Aymara p'isqi white quinoa, Quechua p'isqi a stew or purée of quinoa, -yuq a suffix, "the one with white quinoa") is a mountain in the Vilcanota mountain range in the Andes of Peru, about 5,000 m (16,000 ft) high. It is located in the Cusco Region, Quispicanchi Province, Marcapata District, south of Aquichua.
