= Mawk'a Tampu =

Mountain in Bolivia

- Location within Bolivia

Highest point
- Elevation: 4,940 m (16,210 ft)
- Coordinates: 19°35′S 65°40′W

Geography
- Location: Bolivia, Potosí Department
- Parent range: Andes, Khari Khari mountain range

Mawk'a Tampu (Quechua mawk'a old, tampu inn, "old tampu", hispanicized spelling Maucatambo) is a mountain in the Andes of Bolivia. It lies in the Potosí Department at the border of the provinces Tomás Frías and Cornelio Saavedra. Its summit reaches a height of about 4,940 metres (16,207 ft) above sea level. Mawk'a Tampu is situated in the Khari Khari mountain range east of Potosí. It lies east of the Khari Khari and the Kimsa Kunturiri group and southeast of the Jatun Tiyu Lakes.
