= Yuraq Kancha =

Yuraq Kancha (Quechua yuraq white, kancha enclosure, enclosed place, yard, a frame, or wall that encloses, also spelled Yurac Cancha, Yuracc Cancha, Yuraj Cancha, Yuraccancha, Yurajcancha) may refer to:

- Yuraq Kancha (Bolivia), a mountain in Bolivia
- Yuraq Kancha (Cusco), a mountain in the Cusco Region, Peru
- Yuraq Kancha (Junín), a mountain in the Junín Region, Peru
