= Yanaqucha (Quispicanchi) =

Mountain in Peru

- Location within Peru

Highest point
- Elevation: 4,800 m (15,700 ft)
- Coordinates: 13°38′55″S 70°44′01″W

Geography
- Location: Peru, Cusco Region, Quispicanchi Province
- Parent range: Andes

Yanaqucha (Quechua yana black, qucha lake, "black lake", hispanicized spelling Yana Cocha) is a mountain in the Andes of Peru, about 4,800 metres (15,748 ft) high. It is situated on the border of the districts of Marcapata and Camanti in Quispicanchi Province, Cusco Region. It lies northeast of Piki Mach'ay.

The mountain is named after a little lake northeast of it at 13°38′31″S 70°43′52″W.
