= Yana Mayu (Potosí) =

Mountain in Bolivia

- Location within Bolivia

Highest point
- Elevation: 4,797 m (15,738 ft)
- Coordinates: 19°42′30″S 65°36′50″W

Geography
- Location: Bolivia, Potosí Department
- Parent range: Andes, Potosí mountain range

Yana Mayu (Quechua yana black, mayu river, "black river") is a 4,797-metre-high (15,738 ft) mountain in the Potosí mountain range of the Bolivian Andes. It is located in the Potosí Department, on the border of the Cornelio Saavedra Province, Chaqui Municipality, and the José María Linares Province, Puna Municipality. It is situated northeast of Jatun Kunturiri. The lakes named Kimsa Qucha ("three lakes", Quimsa Khocha) and Q'ara Qucha ("bare lake", Khara Khocha) lie at its feet.
