= Yuraq Qaqa =

Yuraq Qaqa (Quechua yuraq white, qaqa rock, "white rock", also spelled Yurac Caca, Yurac Ccaca, Yurac Ccacca, Yurac Jaja, Yuraj Kaka, Yuraj Khakha, Yuraq Ccaca, Yuraccacca, Yuracgaga, Yuracjaja, Yurajgaga) may refer to:

- Yuraq Qaqa (Apurímac), a mountain in the Apurímac Region, Peru
- Yuraq Qaqa (Bolivia), a mountain in the Potosí Department, Bolivia
- Yuraq Qaqa (Cochabamba), a mountain in the Cochabamba Department, Bolivia
- Yuraq Qaqa (Cusco), a mountain in the Cusco Region, Peru
- Yuraq Qaqa (Lima), a mountain in the Lima Region, Peru
