= Piqui Machay (Cusco) =

Mountain in Peru

- Location within Peru

Highest point
- Elevation: 4,800 m (15,700 ft)
- Coordinates: 13°39′38″S 70°44′21″W

Naming
- Language of name: Quechua

Geography
- Location: Peru, Cusco Region, Quispicanchi Province
- Parent range: Andes

Piqui Machay (possibly from Quechua piki flea, mach'ay cave, "flea cave") is a mountain in the Andes of Peru, about 4,800 metres (15,748 ft) high. It is situated in the Cusco Region, Quispicanchi Province, Marcapata District. It lies southeast of the mountains Vizcachani, Allincapac and Huanacune. At the northern slopes of Piqui Machay there is a little lake named Jomercocha.
