= Wanakuni (Quispicanchi) =

Mountain in Peru

- Location within Peru

Highest point
- Elevation: 4,800 m (15,700 ft)
- Coordinates: 13°38′41″S 70°44′57″W

Geography
- Location: Peru, Cusco Region, Quispicanchi Province
- Parent range: Andes

Wanakuni (Aymara wanaku, wanaqu guanaco, -ni Aymara suffix to indicate ownership, "the one with the guanaco", Hispanicized spelling Huanacune) is a mountain in the Andes of Peru, about 4,800 metres (15,748 ft) high. It is situated in the Cusco Region, Quispicanchi Province, Marcapata District. Wanakuni lies southwest of Machu Apachita and northwest of Piki Mach'ay. The little lake of the mountain is named Q'umirqucha.
