= T'ala Qucha =

Lake in Bolivia

- Location within Bolivia Location within South America
- Interactive map of T'ala Qucha
- Location: Bolivia, Potosí Department, José María Linares Province
- Coordinates: 19°44′30″S 65°36′52″W

T'ala Qucha (Quechua t'ala muddy, qucha lake, "muddy lake", also spelled Tala Khocha) is a lake in the Potosí mountain range in the Andes of Bolivia. It is located in the Potosí Department, José María Linares Province, in the west of the Puna Municipality. T'ala Qucha lies south-east of the mountain Jatun Kunturiri, between the mountains Ch'aki Qucha in the north-east and Kunturiri in the south-west.
