= Pukayuq =

Mountain in Peru

- Location within Peru

Highest point
- Elevation: 5,000 m (16,000 ft)
- Coordinates: 13°45′20″S 70°57′31″W

Naming
- Language of name: Quechua

Geography
- Location: Peru, Cusco Region, Quispicanchi Province
- Parent range: Andes, Willkanuta

Pukayuq (Quechua puka red, -yuq a suffix, "the one with red color", hispanicized spelling Pucayoc) is a mountain in the Willkanuta mountain range in the Andes of Peru, about 5,000 metres (16,404 ft) high. It is situated in the Cusco Region, Quispicanchi Province, Marcapata District. Pukayuq lies south of Q'illu Wallayuq, northeast of Wila Jaqhi and Yayamari and southeast of Yana Urqu.
