= Kuntur Tuqlla =

Mountain in Bolivia

- Location within Bolivia

Highest point
- Elevation: 4,120 m (13,520 ft)
- Coordinates: 19°54′35″S 65°51′43″W

Geography
- Location: Bolivia, Potosí Department
- Parent range: Andes

Kuntur Tuqlla (Quechua kuntur condor, tuqlla trap, "condor trap", also spelled Condortojlla) is a mountain in the Bolivian Andes which reaches a height of approximately 4,120 m (13,520 ft). It is located in the Potosí Department, on the border of the Antonio Quijarro Province, Porco Municipality, and the José María Linares Province, Caiza "D" Municipality. Kuntur Tuqlla lies north of Qanchis Kancha, west of the village of Libruni. The Uqururu Mayu flows along its slopes.
