= Yuraq Yuraq =

Mountain in Bolivia

- Location within Bolivia

Highest point
- Elevation: 4,920 m (16,140 ft)
- Coordinates: 19°38′33″S 65°39′12″W

Geography
- Location: Bolivia; Potosí Department
- Parent range: Andes, Khari Khari mountain range

Yuraq Yuraq (Quechua yuraq white, the reduplication indicates there is a complex or a group of something, "white complex", or yuraq yuraq common name of Gochnatia boliviana, also spelled Yuraj Yuraj) is a mountain in the Khari Khari mountain range of the Bolivian Andes, about 4,920 m (16,142 ft) high. It is situated southeast of Potosí in the Potosí Department. Yuraq Yuraq lies southeast of Illimani and northeast of Q'illu Urqu.
