= Huayruruni =

Mountain in Peru

- Location within Peru

Highest point
- Elevation: 4,900 m (16,100 ft)
- Coordinates: 13°39′01″S 71°04′01″W

Geography
- Location: Peru, Cusco Region
- Parent range: Andes, Vilcanota

Huayruruni (possibly from Aymara wayruru red and black seeds of a plant (Abrus precatorius, Ormosia coccinea and Ormosia minor); also meaning something very beautiful, -ni a suffix to indicate ownership) is a mountain in the Vilcanota mountain range in the Andes of Peru, about 4,900 metres (16,076 ft) high. It is located in the Cusco Region, Quispicanchi Province, Marcapata District. It lies northwest of the peaks of Quinsachata and Quehuesiri.
