= Kura Puñusqa =

Mountain in the Bolivian Andes

- Location within Bolivia

Highest point
- Elevation: 4,562 m (14,967 ft)
- Coordinates: 19°50′50″S 65°45′23″W

Geography
- Location: Bolivia, Potosí Department
- Parent range: Andes

Kura Puñusqa (Quechua kura priest, puñuy to sleep, -sqa a suffix, 'a priest who fell asleep', also spelled Cura Puñuskha) is a 4,562-metre-high (14,967 ft) mountain in the Bolivian Andes. It is located in the Potosí Department, José María Linares Province, Caiza "D" Municipality. The Jalsuri River originates near the mountain. Its waters flow to the Jatun Mayu.
