= K'illi Mayu Punta =

Mountain in Bolivia

- Location within Bolivia

Highest point
- Elevation: 4,588 m (15,052 ft)
- Coordinates: 19°58′49″S 65°52′46″W

Geography
- Location: Bolivia, Potosí Department
- Parent range: Andes

K'illi Mayu Punta (Quechua k'illi American kestrel (Falco sparverius); fringe, mayu river, also spelled Quillimayu Punta) is a 4,588-metre-high (15,052 ft) mountain in the Bolivian Andes. It is located in the Potosí Department, José María Linares Province, Caiza "D" Municipality. It lies southwest of Yuraq Kancha. The K'illi Mayu originates west of K'illi Mayu Punta. It flows to the Uqururu Mayu in the northeast.
