= Camanti District =

Coordinates: 13.1684°S 70.6060°W

Camanti
- District
- Interactive map of Camanti
- Country: Peru
- Region: Cusco
- Province: Quispicanchi
- Founded: October 2, 1951
- Capital: Quince Mil

Government
  - Mayor: Mario Samanez Yáñez

Area
  - Total: 3,174.93 km^{2} (1,225.85 sq mi)
- Elevation: 643 m (2,110 ft)

Population (2005 census)
  - Total: 1,700
  - Density: 0.54/km^{2} (1.4/sq mi)
- Time zone: UTC-5 (PET)
- UBIGEO: 081203

The Camanti District is one of the twelve districts in the Quispicanchi Province in Peru. Created by Law No. 11624 on January 2, 1857, its capital is the town of Quince Mil.

== Geography ==
Some of the highest peaks of the district are listed below:

- Anka Wachana
- Apachita
- Aqu Kunka
- Hatun Machaq Marka Urqu
- Inka Urqu
- Inti Pukllana
- Kimsaqucha
- Machaq Marka Apachita
- Mach'aypata
- Machu Apachita
- Ñañu Wayq'u
- Qanchis Kancha
- Qullpa Qaqa
- Qullpaqucha Urqu
- Sach'ayuq
- Sallaqucha
- Sirk'iyuq
- Wisk'achani
- Wiskana
- Yanaqucha
- Yuraq Unu

== Climate ==
Climate data for Quincemil, elevation 651 m (2,136 ft), (1991–2020)
Month	Jan	Feb	Mar	Apr	May	Jun	Jul	Aug	Sep	Oct	Nov	Dec	Year
Mean daily maximum °C (°F)	29.0 (84.2)	28.7 (83.7)	29.0 (84.2)	29.0 (84.2)	27.4 (81.3)	26.8 (80.2)	27.1 (80.8)	28.6 (83.5)	29.9 (85.8)	29.7 (85.5)	29.0 (84.2)	28.6 (83.5)	28.6 (83.4)
Mean daily minimum °C (°F)	20.0 (68.0)	20.0 (68.0)	19.9 (67.8)	19.6 (67.3)	18.7 (65.7)	18.0 (64.4)	17.3 (63.1)	17.7 (63.9)	18.5 (65.3)	19.4 (66.9)	19.6 (67.3)	19.9 (67.8)	19.1 (66.3)
Average precipitation mm (inches)	675.8 (26.61)	618.8 (24.36)	578.7 (22.78)	366.1 (14.41)	256.3 (10.09)	318.5 (12.54)	328.5 (12.93)	203.4 (8.01)	241.4 (9.50)	410.4 (16.16)	448.2 (17.65)	634.7 (24.99)	5,080.8 (200.03)
Source: National Meteorology and Hydrology Service of Peru

== See also ==
- Q'umirqucha
