= Caiza "D" =

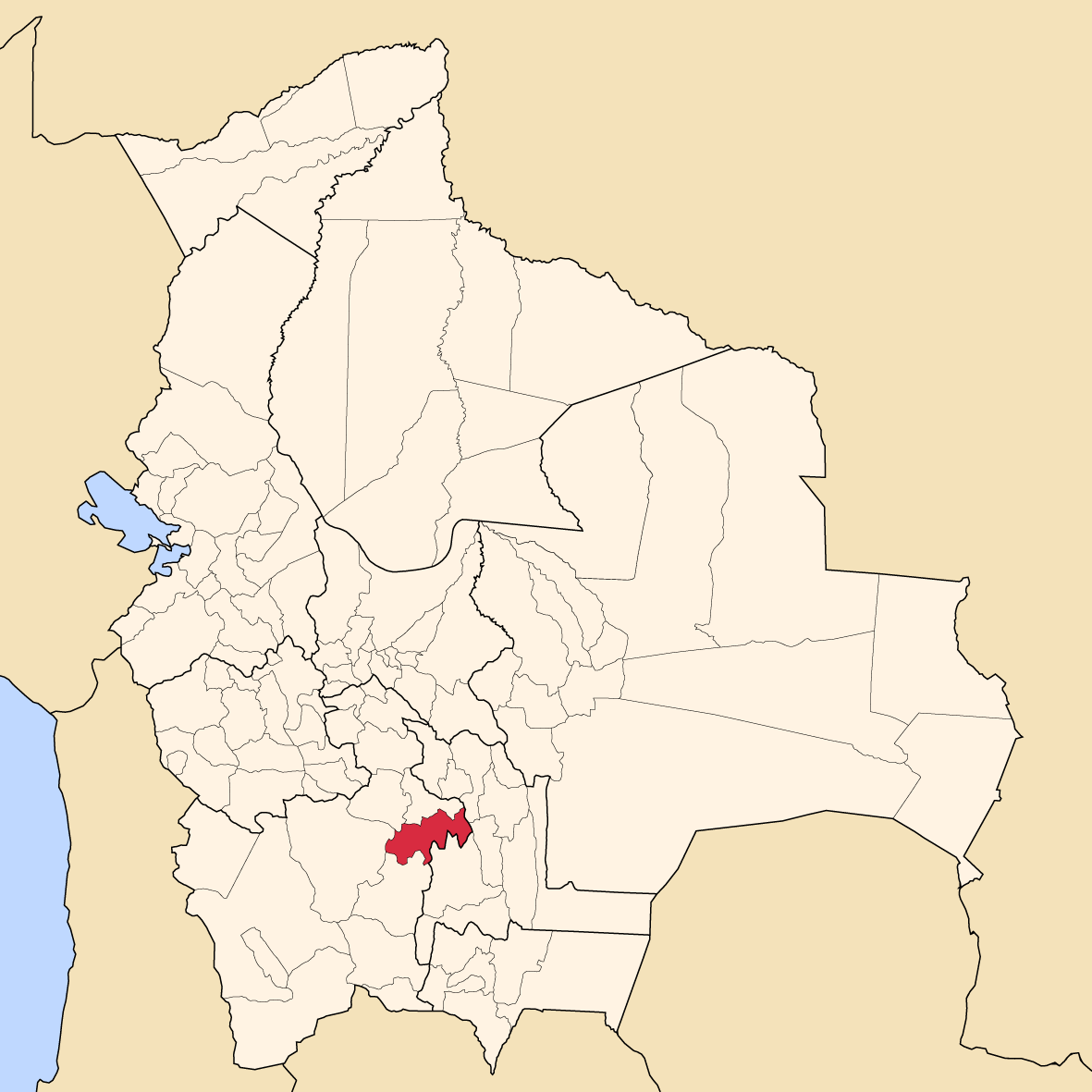
- Map of Bolivia, with José María Linares province in red

- Location in Bolivia
- Coordinates: 20°0′25″S 65°39′14″W
- Country: Bolivia
- Department: Potosí Department
- Province: José María Linares Province
- Municipality: Caiza "D" Municipality
- Canton: Caiza "D" Canton

Population (2012)
  - Total: 1,324
- Time zone: UTC-4 (BOT)

Caiza "D" is a village located in the José María Linares Province in the Potosí Department of Bolivia.
