= Jatun Ch'utu =

Mountain in Bolivia

- Location within Bolivia

Highest point
- Elevation: 4,220 m (13,850 ft)
- Coordinates: 19°42′11″S 65°49′34″W

Geography
- Location: Bolivia, Potosí Department
- Parent range: Andes

Jatun Ch'utu (Quechua jatun big, ch'utu cone, "big cone", also spelled Jatun Chutu) is a mountain in the Bolivian Andes which reaches a height of approximately 4,220 m (13,850 ft). It is located in the Potosí Department, Tomás Frías Province, Potosí Municipality. It lies southeast of the village of Juch'uy Wasi (Juchuy Huasi). The Jatun Mayu flows along its southern slopes.
