= Potosí mountain range =

Mountain range in Bolivia

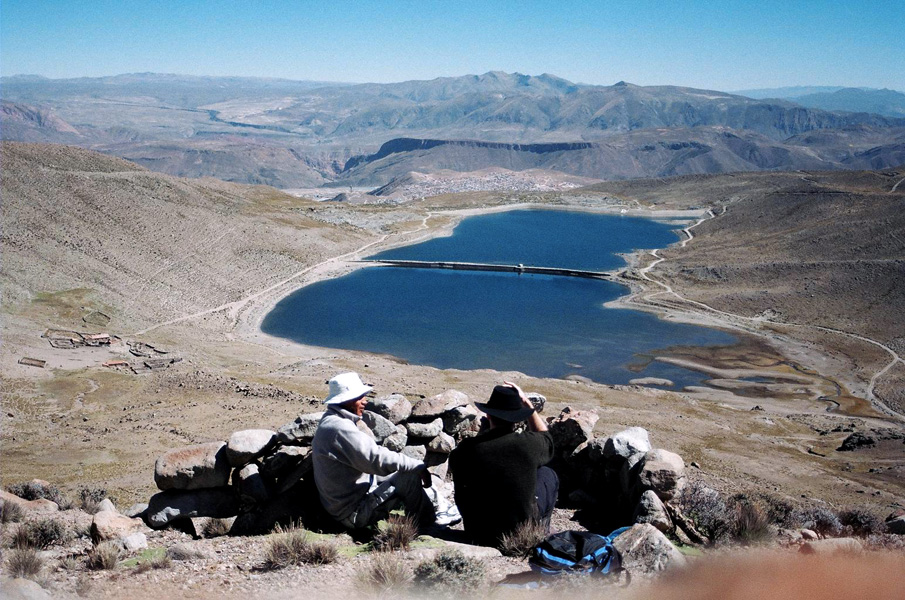
- Looking northwest from the Khari Khari range, the northern part of the Potosí mountain range, across the Khari Khari Lakes towards Potosí in the background

Highest point
- Peak: Khunurana
- Elevation: 16,637 ft (5,071 m)
- Coordinates: 19°41′S 65°38′W

Geography
- Country: Bolivia
- Parent range: Andes

The Potosí mountain range in Bolivia is situated east and southeast of the city of Potosí. It is at least 25 km long stretching from north to south. Its highest mountain is Khunurana (Anaruyu) rising up to 5,071 m (16,637 ft). The features of the range are considered the product of volcanic activity known as the Khari Khari caldera (19º43'S; 65º38'W). The caldera is about 40 km long and 25 km at its widest point.

The range was named Cordillera de Potosí by the German alpinist Henry Hoek in 1903. He collected information about the range like the local names and published several papers about it. The inhabitants of the area, however, use the names Khari Khari for the northern part and Anta Q'awa for the southern one. The two sections are separated by a depression, the Jach'a Molino Pampa.

== Mountains ==
=== Khari Khari range ===
The Khari Khari range contains a number of mountains which are more than 4,900 m high, the highest elevation being Khari Khari (5,040 m). Other mountains are listed below:

- Allqamari, 4,280 m (14,040 ft)
- Cerro del Abra*, 4,960 m (16,270 ft)
- Cóndor Negro*, 5,000 m (16,000 ft)
- Illimani, 5,030 m (16,500 ft)
- Jatun Q'asa, 5,023 m (16,480 ft)
- Jatun T'ira, 4,740 m (15,550 ft)
- Jayu Jayu, 4,264 m (13,990 ft)
- Juch'uy T'ira, 4,580 m (15,030 ft)
- Juqhuni, 4,920 m (16,140 ft)
- Kimsa Chata, 4,680 m (15,350 ft)
- Kimsa Kunturiri group, 5,020 m (16,470 ft), 4,980 m (16,340 ft), 4,960 m (16,270 ft)
- Kimsa Waylla, 4,980 m (16,340 ft)
- Kiwuta K'iña, 4,800 m (15,700 ft)
- K'allampani, 4,720 m (15,490 ft)
- Llallawa, 3,740 m (12,270 ft)
- Masuni, 4,980 m (16,340 ft)
- Mawk'a Tampu, 4,940 m (16,210 ft)
- Muqun Punta, 4,520 metres (14,830 ft)
- Muqun Urqu, 4,958 m (16,266 ft)
- Murmuntani, 4,840 m (15,880 ft)
- Puka Punta*, 5,020 m (16,470 ft)
- Qucha Qucha, 4,440 m (14,570 ft)
- Qhispi Llaqta, 4,780 m (15,680 ft)
- Q'asiri, 4,880 m (16,010 ft)
- Q'illu Urqu, 4,960 m (16,270 ft)
- Q'illu Q'asa, 4,960 m (16,270 ft)
- Sip'uruni*, 4,966 m (16,293 ft)
- Suchu Suchu Punta, 4,960 m (16,270 ft)
- Tani Tani, 4,649 m (15,253 ft)
- Tani Tani, 4,465 m (14,649 ft)
- Uma Jalanta, 4,760 m (15,620 ft)
- Wak'ani, 4,960 m (16,270 ft)
- Wich'u Qullu, 4,440 m (14,570 ft)
- Yana Punta*, 4,920 m (16,140 ft)
- Yana Urqu, 4,660 m (15,290 ft)
- Yana Urqu, 4,640 m (15,220 ft)
- Yana Salla, 4,620 m (15,160 ft)
- Yuraq Apachita, 4,610 m (15,120 ft)
- Yuraq Laq'a, 3,740 m (12,270 ft)
- Yuraq Yuraq, 4,920 m (16,140 ft)

Cerro Rico (4,824 m (15,827 ft)) lies west of the main range.

=== Anta Q'awa range ===
South of Jach'a Molino Pampa, in the Anta Q'awa range, there are:

- Anta Q'awa, 4,980 m (16,340 ft)
- Cerro de la Mina*, 4,940 m (16,210 ft)
- Ch'aki Qucha, 4,628 m (15,184 ft)
- Hundimiento, 5,002 m (16,411 ft)
- Jatun Kunturiri, 5,008 m (16,430 ft)
- Juch'uy Lip'ichi, 4,840 m (15,880 ft)
- Kimsa Qullu, 4,500 m (14,800 ft)
- Kinwa Qullu, 4,900 m (16,100 ft)
- Khunurana (Anaruyu), 5,071 m (16,637 ft)
- Kuntur Ikiña, 4,661 m (15,292 ft)
- Kuntur Sayana, 4,322 m (14,180 ft)
- Kunturiri, 4,867 m (15,968 ft)
- Kunturiri, 4,600 m (15,100 ft)
- Link'u, 4,700 m (15,400 ft)
- Lip'ichi, 4,840 m (15,880 ft)
- Mach'a Anta Q'awa, 5,042 m (16,542 ft)
- Machu, 5,042 m (16,542 ft)
- Mulli P'unqu, 4,892 m (16,050 ft)
- Muru Urqu, 4,760 m (15,620 ft)
- Muyu Q'asa, 4,240 m (13,910 ft)
- Phina Urqu, 4,860 m (15,940 ft)
- P'allta Urqu, 4,840 m (15,880 ft)
- P'isaqana, 4,502 m (14,770 ft)
- P'ukru, 4,768 m (15,643 ft)
- Q'asiri, 4,900 m (16,100 ft)
- Q'umir Qucha, 5,020 m (16,470 ft)
- Satari, 4,588 m (15,052 ft)
- Uma Chhukuta, 4,902 m (16,083 ft)
- Warawara ridge, 4,900 m (16,100 ft)
- Wisk'achani, 4,416 m (14,488 ft)
- Yana Mayu, 4,797 m (15,738 ft)
- Yana Urqu group, 4,860 m (15,940 ft)
- Yana Urqu, 4,840 m (15,880 ft)

== Lakes ==
During the colonial epoch artificial lakes were built in the Khari Khari range, finally up to 32 lakes. The main purpose was to produce hydroelectric power to run the smelters of the mines. Some of these lakes are still used today for the water supply of the city. Today there are 22 lakes of the Khari Khari range belonging to six systems:

- the Pati Pati system with 3 lakes: Atucha, Santa Lucía, Candelaria
- the San José system with 7 lakes: Llama Mikhu, San José I, San José II, Buena Ventura, Llama Kunka, Wak'ani, Providencia
- the Suras or Calderón system with 1 lake: Calderón
- the San Ildefonso system with 3 lakes: Khari Khari Lakes (San Ildefonso, San Pablo, now integrated into San Ildefonso), San Fernando
- the San Sebastián system with 6 lakes: Muñisa, Masuni, Criciza, San Lázaro, San Sebastián, Planilla (now integrated into San Sebastián)
- the Challwiri system with 2 lakes: Illimani, Tawaqu Ñuñu or Challwiri.

South of Jach'a Molino Pampa there are two more systems:

- the Lakha Ch'akha system with one lake: Lakha Ch'akha
- the Ch'alluma system with Ch'alluma (I and II) and Turina.

Other notable lakes are T'ala Qucha and Q'umir Qucha.

== See also ==
- Cordillera de los Frailes

== Notes ==
- Names with a star (*) stand for mountain names by Evelio Echevarría used in a paper about his expeditions to the range because the original local names were not available
