= Caiza "D" Municipality =

- Municipality
- Flag

- Location within Bolivia
- Coordinates: 20°0′0″S 65°40′0″W
- Country: Bolivia
- Department: Potosí Department
- Province: José María Linares Province
- Seat: Caiza "D"
- Elevation: 11,200 ft (3,400 m)

Population (2012)
  - Total: 12,067
  - Ethnicities: Quechua
- Time zone: UTC-4 (BOT)

Caiza "D" Municipality is the second municipal section of the José María Linares Province in the Potosí Department in Bolivia.
