= Muru Wasi =

Mountain in Bolivia

- Location within Bolivia

Highest point
- Elevation: 4,180 m (13,710 ft)
- Coordinates: 19°53′30″S 65°50′07″W

Geography
- Location: Bolivia, Potosí Department
- Parent range: Andes

Muru Wasi (Quechua muru seed, wasi house, "seed house", also spelled Muru Huasi) is a mountain in the Bolivian Andes which reaches a height of approximately 4,180 m (13,710 ft). It is located in the Potosí Department, José María Linares Province, Caiza "D" Municipality, near the border to the Antonio Quijarro Province, Porco Municipality. Muru Wasi lies southwest of Lluqu LLuqu. The Uqururu Mayu flows along its southern slope.
