= Khari Khari =

Mountain in Bolivia

- Location within Bolivia

Highest point
- Elevation: 5,040 m (16,540 ft)
- Coordinates: 19°35′08″S 65°41′08″W

Geography
- Location: Bolivia, Potosí Department
- Parent range: Andes, Potosí mountain range

Khari Khari (Quechua, a thorny medical plant, a species of rubus, hispanicized spellings Cari Cari, Kari Kari, Kari-Kari) is a mountain in the Andes in the Potosí Department of Bolivia. It is the second highest elevation in the Potosí mountain range rising up to (5,040 m (16,535 ft). It is also the highest mountain in the Khari Khari mountain range, the northern part of the Potosí mountain range.

Khari Khari lies east of Potosí and north-east of the Khari Khari Lakes.

== See also ==
- Kari-Kari (caldera)
- Kimsa Kunturiri
- Mawk'a Tampu
