= Puna, Potosí =

Puna
- Location in Bolivia
- Coordinates: 19°47′41″S 65°30′21″W
- Country: Bolivia
- Department: Potosí Department
- Province: José María Linares Province
- Municipality: Puna Municipality
- Canton: Puna Canton

Population (2012)
  - Total: 1,525
- Time zone: UTC-4 (BOT)

Puna is a village and the capital of the José María Linares Province in the Potosí Department of Bolivia.

== Climate ==
Climate data for Puna, elevation 3,420 m (11,220 ft), (1973–2013)
Month	Jan	Feb	Mar	Apr	May	Jun	Jul	Aug	Sep	Oct	Nov	Dec	Year
Mean daily maximum °C (°F)	20.3 (68.5)	19.8 (67.6)	20.2 (68.4)	20.9 (69.6)	21.1 (70.0)	20.3 (68.5)	19.7 (67.5)	20.7 (69.3)	21.3 (70.3)	21.7 (71.1)	21.7 (71.1)	21.4 (70.5)	20.8 (69.4)
Daily mean °C (°F)	14.2 (57.6)	13.9 (57.0)	13.4 (56.1)	12.6 (54.7)	10.6 (51.1)	9.2 (48.6)	8.8 (47.8)	10.2 (50.4)	11.9 (53.4)	13.3 (55.9)	14.1 (57.4)	14.6 (58.3)	12.2 (54.0)
Mean daily minimum °C (°F)	8.2 (46.8)	8.0 (46.4)	8.0 (46.4)	6.5 (43.7)	4.4 (39.9)	0.1 (32.2)	−1.8 (28.8)	−2.1 (28.2)	−0.2 (31.6)	2.4 (36.3)	4.9 (40.8)	6.5 (43.7)	7.8 (46.0)
Average precipitation mm (inches)	94.7 (3.73)	83.9 (3.30)	73.1 (2.88)	24.9 (0.98)	2.9 (0.11)	0.6 (0.02)	1.1 (0.04)	4.3 (0.17)	10.5 (0.41)	27.9 (1.10)	35.2 (1.39)	76.8 (3.02)	435.9 (17.15)
Average precipitation days	13.1	11.4	10.4	4.4	0.6	0.3	0.4	0.9	2.3	5.0	6.3	10.9	66
Average relative humidity (%)	68.7	69.1	66.6	60.5	49.4	44.7	43.1	47.2	53.6	60.1	62.0	64.5	57.5
Source: Servicio Nacional de Meteorología e Hidrología de Bolivia
