= Yuraq Qaqa (Bolivia) =

Mountain in Bolivia

- Location within Bolivia

Highest point
- Elevation: 4,340 m (14,240 ft)
- Coordinates: 19°57′03″S 65°53′54″W

Geography
- Location: Bolivia, Potosí Department
- Parent range: Andes

Yuraq Qaqa (Quechua yuraq white, qaqa rock, "white rock", also spelled Yuraj Kaka) is a mountain in the Bolivian Andes which reaches a height of approximately 4,340 m (14,240 ft). It is located in the Potosí Department, at the border of the Antonio Quijarro Province, Porco Municipality, and the José María Linares Province, Caiza "D" Municipality. It lies at the Tapial Mayu, southwest of Qanchis Kancha.
