= Machu Apachita =

Mountain in Peru

- Location within Peru

Highest point
- Elevation: 4,800 m (15,700 ft)
- Coordinates: 13°37′44″S 70°44′36″W

Geography
- Location: Peru, Cusco Region
- Parent range: Andes

Machu Apachita (Quechua machu old, old person, Aymara apachita the place of transit of an important pass in the principal routes of the Andes; name in the Andes for a stone cairn, a little pile of rocks built along the trail in the high mountains, also spelled Machu Apacheta) is a mountain in the Andes of Peru, about 4,800 m (15,700 ft) high. It is located in the Cusco Region, Quispicanchi Province, on the border of the districts of Camanti and Marcapata. It is situated southeast of Wisk'achani.
