= Chojorusi =

Mountain in Peru

- Location within Peru

Highest point
- Elevation: 5,000 m (16,000 ft)
- Coordinates: 13°41′58″S 70°44′50″W

Geography
- Location: Peru, Cusco Region
- Parent range: Andes, Vilcanota

Chojorusi (possibly from Aymara for a colored clay used to paint houses) is a mountain in the Vilcanota mountain range in the Andes of Peru, about 5,000 metres (16,404 ft) high. It is located in the Cusco Region, Quispicanchi Province, Marcapata District. Chojorusi lies southwest of Puicutuni and northwest of Llusca Ritti and Sullulluni.
