= Marcapata District =

Coordinates: 13.5897°S 70.9764°W

Marcapata Markapata
- District
- Interactive map of Marcapata
- Country: Peru
- Region: Cusco
- Province: Quispicanchi
- Founded: January 20, 1869
- Capital: Marcapata

Government
  - Mayor: Francisco Herencia Chusi

Area
  - Total: 1,687.91 km^{2} (651.71 sq mi)
- Elevation: 3,150 m (10,330 ft)

Population (2005 census)
  - Total: 5,141
  - Density: 3.046/km^{2} (7.889/sq mi)
- Time zone: UTC-5 (PET)
- UBIGEO: 081209

The Marcapata District is one of the twelve districts in the Quispicanchi Province in Peru. Created on January 20, 1869, its capital is Marcapata.

== Geography ==
The Willkanuta mountain range traverses the province. Some of the highest peaks of the district are Chumpi, Hatun Ñañu Punta, Wila Jaqhi and Yayamari. Other mountains are listed below:

- Allin Qhapaq
- Ananta
- Anka Wachana
- Antaymarka
- Apu K'uchu
- Chachakumani
- Chiri Unuyuq
- Chuqurusi
- Chhuxlluni
- Ch'uñuna
- Hatun Allpapata
- Hapu Punta
- Huch'uy Ananta
- Istalla
- Jach'a Sira
- Jaqhichuwa
- Kimsachata
- Kiswarniyuq
- Kuntur Ikiña
- Llusk'a Rit'i
- Machu Apachita
- Piki Mach'ay
- Pararani
- Puka Salla
- Pukaqucha
- Pukayuq
- Phaq'u
- P'isqiyuq
- P'uykutuni
- Qanchis Kancha
- Qillqata
- Qullpa Qaqa (Cusco-Puno)
- Qullpa Qaqa (Huch'uy Ananta)
- Qullpa Qaqa (Marcapata)
- Quri Pukara
- Q'illu Kunka
- Q'illu Wallayuq
- Q'iwisiri
- Sanimayu
- Saqsa Ananta
- Sullulluni
- Suyu Parina
- Tuqllayuq
- Urqu Puñuna
- Wanakuni
- Waracha
- Wari Sayana
- Wayruruni
- Wilaquta
- Willulluni
- Wisk'achani (Camanti-Marcapata)
- Wisk'achani (Cusco-Puno)
- Wisk'achani (Marcapata-Ocongate)
- Yanaqucha
- Yana Q'asa
- Yana Urqu (Hapu Punta)
- Yana Urqu (Jaqhichuwa)
- Yana Urqu (Mullu P'unqu)
- Yana Urqu (Q'umirqucha)
- Yana Urqu (Yayamari)
- Yuraq Kancha
- Yuraq Kunka

== Ethnic groups ==
The people in the district are mainly indigenous citizens of Quechua descent. Quechua is the language which the majority of the population (87.29%) learnt to speak in childhood, 12.33% of the residents started speaking using the Spanish language (2007 Peru Census).

== See also ==
- Q'umirqucha (Q'umir Qucha)
- Q'umirqucha (Yanaq Qusqu K'uchu)
