= Uma Jalanta (Potosí) =

Mountain in Bolivia

- Location within Bolivia

Highest point
- Elevation: 4,760 m (15,620 ft)
- Coordinates: 19°36′51″S 65°38′26″W

Geography
- Location: Bolivia; Potosí Department
- Parent range: Andes, Khari Khari mountain range

Uma Jalanta (Aymara uma water, jalaña to fly, running of water, -nta a suffix) is a mountain in the Khari Khari mountain range of the Bolivian Andes, about 4,760 m (15,617 ft) high. It is situated south east of Potosí in the Potosí Department, Tomás Frías Province, Potosí Municipality. Uma Jalanta lies north-east of Challwiri Lake and the mountain Illimani.

== See also ==
- Kimsa Waylla
