= Jollpajaja (Marcapata) =

Mountain in Peru

- Location within Peru

Highest point
- Elevation: 4,600 m (15,100 ft)
- Coordinates: 13°38′00″S 70°47′30″W

Geography
- Location: Peru, Cusco Region, Quispicanchi Province, Marcapata District
- Parent range: Andes, Vilcanota

Jollpajaja (likely from Quechua qullpa salty, salpeter, qaqa rock, "salpeter rock") is a mountain in the Vilcanota mountain range in the Andes of Peru, about 4,600 metres (15,092 ft) high. It is located in the Cusco Region, Quispicanchi Province, Marcapata District. It is situated southwest of Vizcachani and north of Yana Orjo. West of Jollpajaja and Yana Orjo, there is a small lake named Mullopunco.
