= Q'umirqucha (Yanaq Qusqu K'uchu) =

Lake in Peru

- Location within Peru
- Location: Peru; Cusco Region
- Coordinates: 13°45′43″S 70°45′48″W
- Max. length: 0.54 km (0.34 mi)
- Max. width: 0.36 km (0.22 mi)
- Surface elevation: 4,637 m (15,213 ft)

Q'umirqucha or Q'umir Qucha (Quechua q'umir green, qucha lake, "green lake", hispanicized spelling Jomercocha) is a lake in Peru located in the Cusco Region, Quispicanchi Province, Marcapata District. It is situated at a height of about 4,637 metres (15,213 ft), about 0.54 km long and 0.36 km at its widest point. Q'umirqucha lies between the mountains Paqu Ananta and Ch'akiriyuq of the Willkanuta mountain range, north of the village Yanaq Qusqu K'uchu.
