= Kunturiri (Linares) =

Mountain in Bolivia

- Location within Bolivia

Highest point
- Elevation: 4,867 m (15,968 ft)
- Coordinates: 19°44′42″S 65°37′56″W

Geography
- Location: Bolivia, Potosí Department
- Parent range: Andes, Potosí mountain range

Kunturiri (Aymara kunturi condor, -(i)ri a suffix, Hispanicized spelling Condoriri) is a 4,867-metre-high (15,968 ft) mountain in the Potosí mountain range in the Bolivian Andes. It is situated south-east of Potosí in the Potosí Department, José María Linares Province, in the west of the Puna Municipality. Kunturiri lies south of the mountain Jatun Kunturiri and west of the lake T'ala Qucha.
