= Ananta (Cusco) =

Mountain in Peru

- Location within Peru

Highest point
- Elevation: 5,200 m (17,100 ft)
- Coordinates: 13°46′04″S 70°48′53″W

Geography
- Location: Peru, Cusco Region
- Parent range: Andes, Vilcanota

Ananta is a mountain in the Vilcanota mountain range in the Andes of Peru, about 5,200 metres (17,060 ft) high. It is located in the Cusco Region, Quispicanchi Province, Marcapata District. It lies northeast of the higher peak of Pajo Ananta.

The river Pucamayu (possibly from Quechua for "red river") which downstream is named Sayapata originates west of Ananta. It flows to the northwest.
