= History of Bolivia to 1809 =

Francisco Pizarro and his fellow conquistadors from the rapidly growing Spanish Empire first arrived in the New World in 1524. But even before the arrival of the Europeans, the Inca Empire was floundering. Pizarro enjoyed stunning successes in his military campaign against the Incas, who were defeated despite some resistance. In 1538, the Spaniards defeated Inca forces near Lake Titicaca, allowing Spanish penetration into central and southern Bolivia.

Although native resistance continued for some years, Spanish conquerors pushed forward, founding cities of La Paz in 1549 and Santa Cruz de la Sierra in 1561. In the region then known as Upper Peru, the Spaniards found the mineral treasure chest they had been searching for - Potosí had the Western world's largest concentration of silver. At its height in the 16th century, Potosí supported a population of more than 150,000, making it the world's largest urban center. In the 1570s, Viceroy Francisco de Toledo introduced a coercive form of labor, the mita, which required native males from highland districts to spend every sixth year working in the mines. The mita and technological advances in refining caused mining at Potosí to flourish.

In the early 18th century, the mining industry entered a prolonged period of decline, as evidenced by the eclipsing of Potosí by La Paz. After 1700, only small amounts of bullion were shipped from Upper Peru to Spain. In the mid-18th century, Spanish control over South America began to weaken. In 1780 the Inca descendant, Túpac Amaru II led nearly 60,000 natives in a battle against the Spaniards near the Peruvian city of Cuzco. Spain put down the revolt in 1783 and executed thousands of natives as punishment, but the revolt illustrated the precarious nature of Spanish colonial rule in the Andes.

== Conquest and colonial rule, 1532-1809 ==
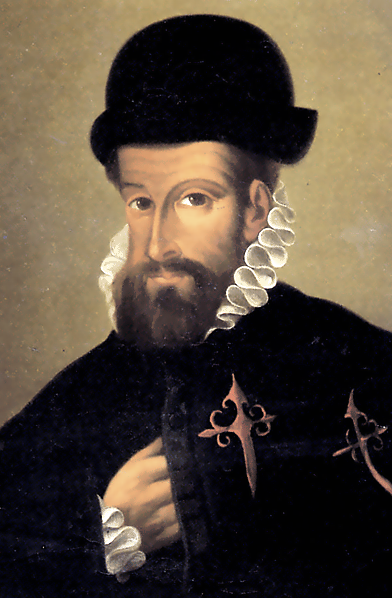
Francisco Pizarro

=== Conquest and settlement ===
Francisco Pizarro, Diego de Almagro, and Hernando de Luque led the Spanish discovery and conquest of the Inca Empire. They first sailed south in 1524 along the Pacific coast from Panama to confirm the legendary existence of a land of gold called Biru.

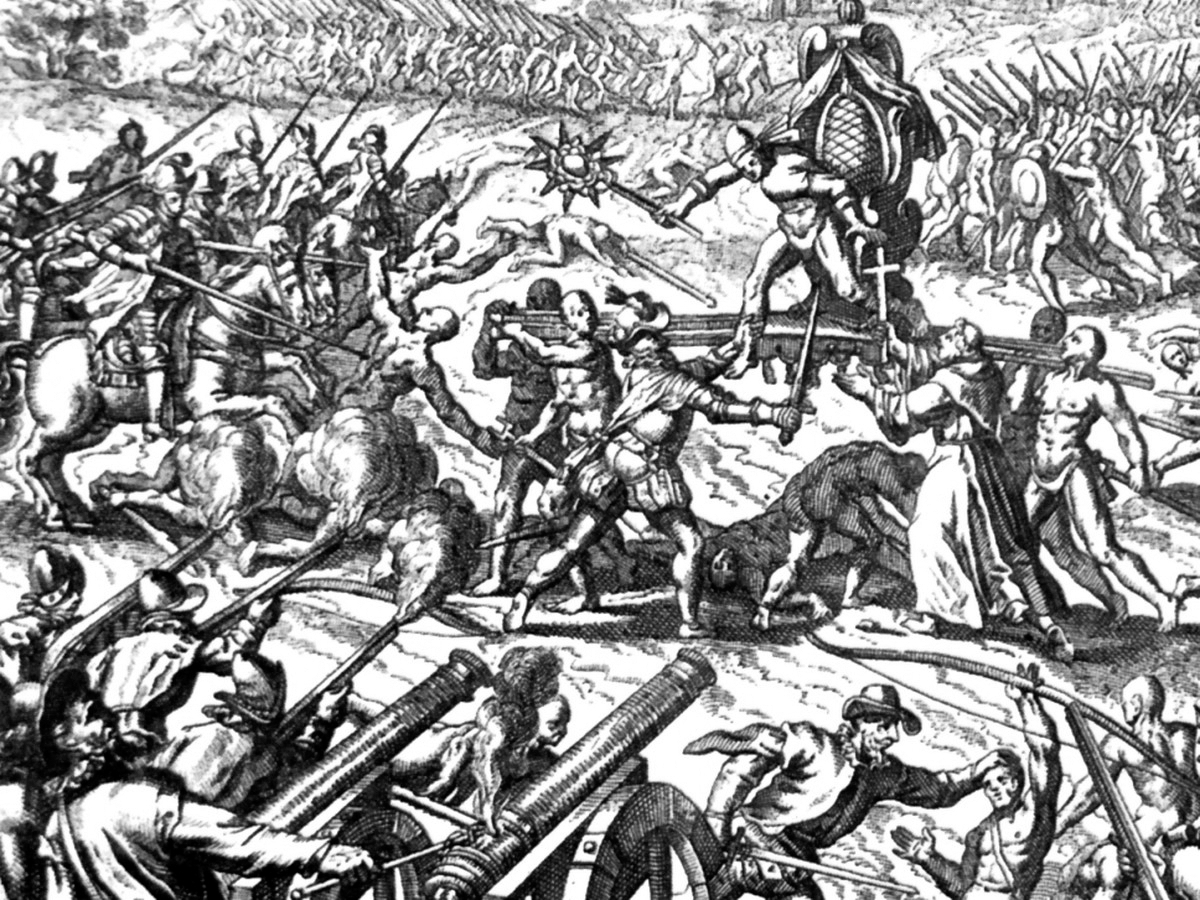
Contemporary engraving of the Battle of Cajamarca, showing Emperor Atahualpa surrounded on his palanquin

Because the rapidly expanding Inca Empire was internally weak, the conquest was remarkably easy. After the Inca Huayna Capac died in 1527, his sons Huascar and Atahualpa fought a civil war over the succession. Although Atahualpa defeated his brother, he had not yet consolidated his power when the Spaniards arrived in 1532, and he seriously misjudged their strength. Atahualpa did not attempt to defeat Pizarro when he arrived on the coast in 1532 because the Incan ruler was convinced that those who commanded the mountains also controlled the coast. When Pizarro formed alliances with Indians who resented Inca rule, Atahualpa did not modify the Inca ceremonial approach to warfare, which included launching attacks by the light of the full moon. On November 16, 1532, Pizarro imprisoned Atahualpa during their first encounter and later executed him, even after payment of a ransom equivalent to half a century of European production of gold and silver. One year later, Cuzco fell.

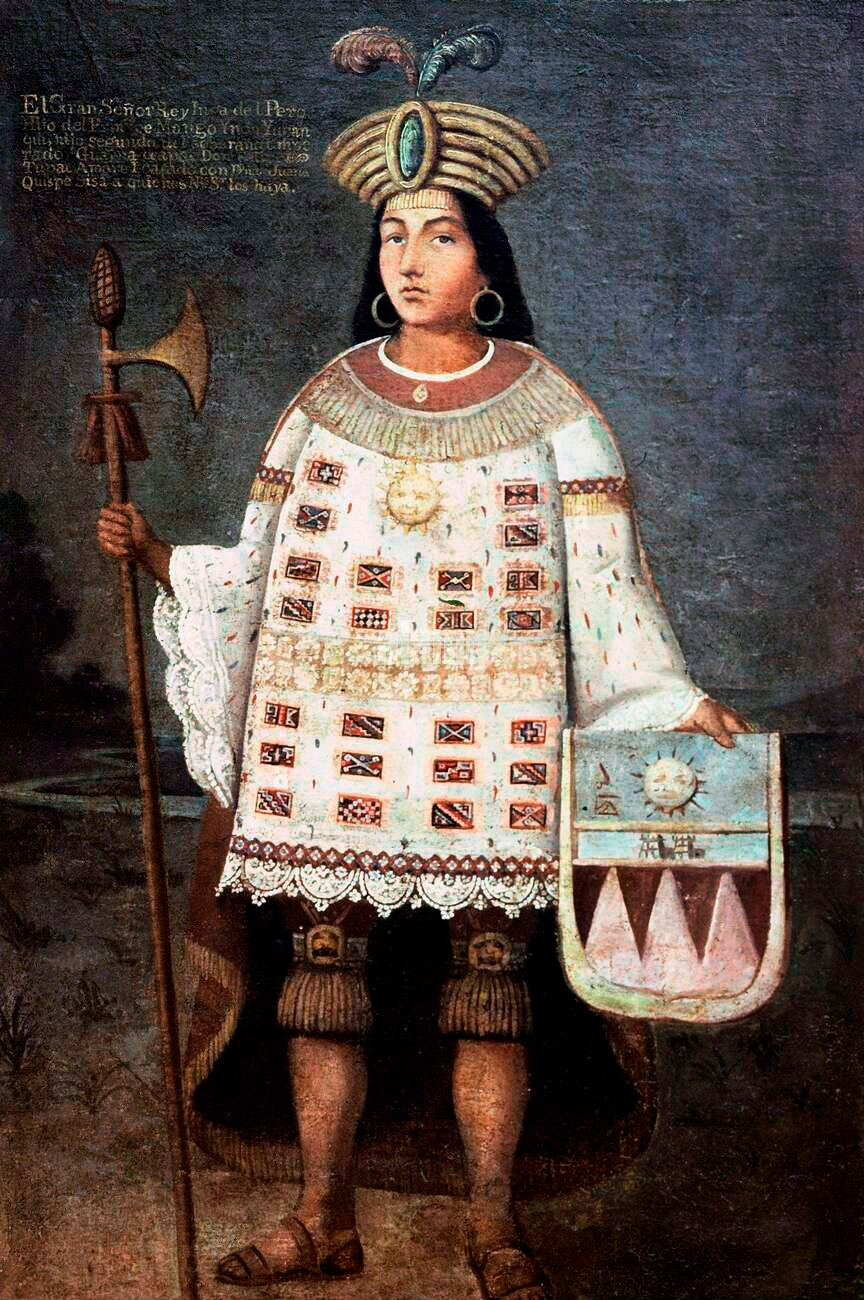
Tupac Amaru

Despite Pizarro's quick victory, Indian rebellions soon began and continued periodically throughout the colonial period. In 1535 conquistador Diego Almagro amassed a large army and departed Cuzco in an expedition to the lands of Chile. In doing so he passed through the settlements of Paria and Tupiza. Taking advantage of Almagro's departure, in 1536 Manco Inca, whom the Spanish had established as a puppet emperor, rebelled against the new rulers and laid siege to Cuzco.

During the first two decades of Spanish rule, the settlement of the Bolivian highlands — later known as Upper (Alto) Peru or Charcas — was delayed by a civil war between the forces of Pizarro and those of Almagro. The two conquistadors had divided the Incan territory, with the north under the control of Pizarro and the south under that of Almagro. Fighting broke out in 1537 when Almagro seized Cuzco after suppressing the Manco Inca rebellion. Pizarro defeated and executed Almagro in 1538, following the Battle of Las Salinas, but was himself assassinated three years later by former supporters of Almagro. Pizarro's brother Gonzalo assumed control of Upper Peru but soon became embroiled in a rebellion against the Spanish crown. Only with the execution of Gonzalo Pizarro in 1548 did Spain succeed in reasserting its authority; later that year, colonial authorities established the city of La Paz, which soon became an important commercial and transshipment center.

Indigenous resistance delayed the conquest and settlement of the Bolivian lowlands. The Spanish established Santa Cruz de la Sierra in 1561, but the Gran Chaco, the colonial name for the arid Chaco region, remained a violent frontier throughout the colonial period. In the Chaco, indigenous populations, mostly Ava Guaraní (Chiriguano), carried out unrelenting attacks against colonial settlements and remained independent of direct Spanish control.

17th and 18th century revolts in the Bolivian highlands were usually organized by the elders of the community and remained local, the exception being the great rebellion of Túpac Amaru II and Túpac Katari in the eighteenth century.

=== The economy of colonial Upper Peru ===
Spain immediately recognized the enormous economic potential of Upper Peru. The highlands were rich in minerals, and Potosí had the Western world's largest concentration of silver. The area was heavily populated and could supply workers for the silver mines. In addition, Upper Peru could provide food for the miners on the Altiplano.

==== Silver mining ====
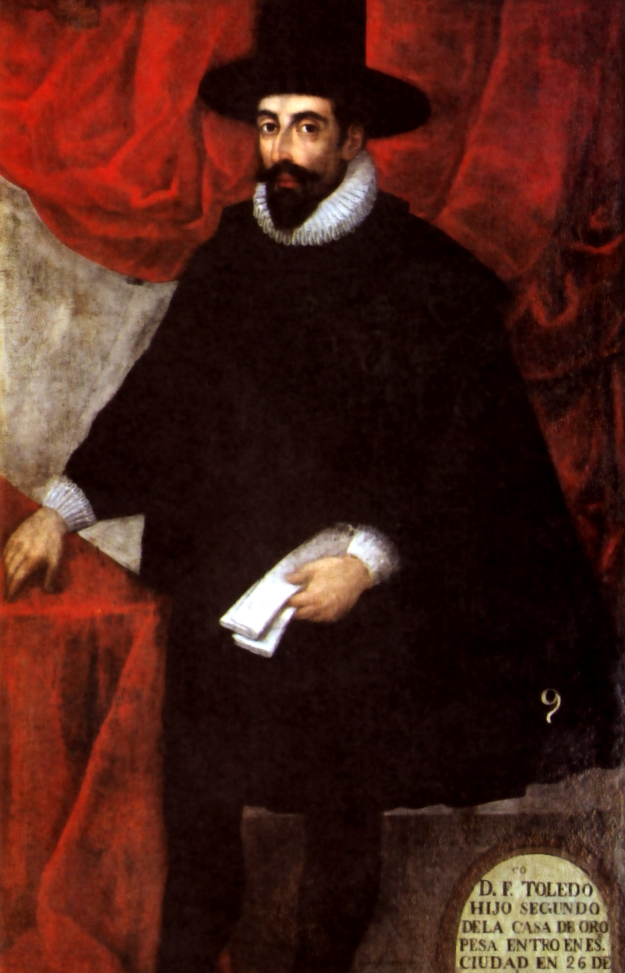
Francisco de Toledo

Despite these conditions, silver production fluctuated dramatically during the colonial period. After an initial fifteen-year surge in production, output began to fall in 1560 as a result of a severe labor shortage caused by the Indian population's inability to resist European diseases. Around the same time, Potosí's rich surface deposits became depleted, which meant that even more labor would be required to extract silver. The labor shortage was addressed by Francisco de Toledo, the energetic viceroy (the king's representative) of Peru, during a visit to Upper Peru in the 1570s. Toledo used the pre-Columbian mita to extract forced labor for the Potosí mines from some sixteen highlands districts designated as supplying mita. Adult males could be required to spend every sixth year working in the mines. Henceforth, Potosí mining depended on the mita and on a labor system in which relatively free men worked alongside those who were coerced. Toledo also regulated the mining laws, established a mint at Potosí, and introduced the mercury amalgam process. Adopting the amalgam process was particularly important because it eliminated Indian control over refining.

The second problem, the exhaustion of the high-content surface ores, required technological innovations. Hydraulic power took on increased importance because of the construction of large refining centers. By 1621, a system of artificial lakes with several million tons storage capacity provided a steady water supply for refineries. With the labor and technological problems resolved, silver mining flourished. By the middle of the 17th century, silver mining at Potosí had become so important that the city had the largest population in the Western Hemisphere, approximately 160,000 inhabitants.

A major decline followed the end of the 17th boom in the mining industry. The exhaustion of the first rich veins required deeper and more expensive shafts. The rapid decrease of the Indian population due to disease and exploitation by the mita also reduced silver output. After 1700, only small amounts of bullion from Upper Peru were shipped to Spain.

Kings from the Bourbon Dynasty in Spain tried to reform the colonial economy in the mid-eighteenth century by reviving mining. The Spanish crown provided the financial support necessary to develop deeper shafts, and in 1736, it agreed to lower the tax rate from 20 to 10 percent of the total output. The crown also helped create a minerals purchasing bank, the Banco de San Carlos, in 1751 and subsidized the mercury price to local mines. The foundation of an academy of metallurgy in Potosí indicated the crown's concern with technical improvements in silver production. However, the attempts to revive the mining sector in Upper Peru were only partially successful and could not halt the economic collapse of Potosí at the beginning of the 19th century. Nevertheless, mining remained critical to the economy of Upper Peru because food supplies sent from the valleys to mining centers on the Altiplano influenced agricultural production.

==== Agriculture ====
Farming at first took place on colonial encomiendas. The crown granted a small number of conquistadors the right to the labor and produce of Indians living in the encomienda, and by the 1650s, there were some eighty-two encomiendas in Upper Peru. Encomenderos tended to monopolize agricultural production, control the cheap Indian labor, and collect the tribute that the Indians had to pay to the crown. Because encomenderos were difficult to control and abused their laborers, the crown tried repeatedly to bring Indians under its direct jurisdiction and control.

In the second half of the sixteenth century, agricultural production shifted from encomiendas to large estates, where Indians worked in exchange for land use. Cochabamba became a major producer of corn and wheat, and the valleys produced coca leaves in increasing amounts during colonial rule.

In addition to mining and agricultural production, Indian tribute (alcabala) became an increasingly important source of income for the crown despite Indian migration to avoid payment. An early effort to collect tribute from Indians by moving them into villages or indigenous communities (comunidades indígenas) was unsuccessful because of resistance from both encomenderos and Indians. But by the late 18th century, an increase in the Indian population, the extension of tribute payments to all Indian males (including those who owned land), and a relative decline in income from the mines combined to make alcabala the second largest source of income in Upper Peru. Tribute payments also increased because Spanish absolutism made no concessions to human misfortune, such as natural disasters. The Indian tribute was increased by 1 million Spanish dollars annually.

== Colonial state, church, and society ==
=== Administration ===
The longevity of Spain's empire in South America can be explained partly by the successful administration of the colonies. At first, it was primarily interested in controlling the independent-minded conquistadors. Still, the main goal soon became maintaining the flow of revenue to the crown and collecting the tribute of goods and labor from the Indian population. To this end, Spain soon created an elaborate bureaucracy in the New World in which various institutions served as watchdogs over each other, and local officials had considerable autonomy.

Upper Peru, at first a part of the Viceroyalty of Peru, was included in the new Viceroyalty of Río de la Plata (whose capital was Buenos Aires) when it was created in 1776. The viceroy was aided by the audiencia (council), which was simultaneously the highest court of appeal in the jurisdiction and, in the absence of the viceroy, also had administrative and executive powers.

The wealth of Upper Peru and its remoteness from Lima convinced the authorities in Lima to create an audiencia in the city of Chuquisaca (present-day Sucre) in 1558. Chuquisaca had become particularly important as Potosí's administrative and agricultural supply center. The jurisdiction of the audiencia, known as Audiencia of Charcas, initially covered a radius of 100 "leagues" (179,600 hectares) around Chuquisaca, but it soon included Santa Cruz and territory belonging to present-day Paraguay and, until 1568, also the entire district of Cuzco. The president of the audiencia had judicial authority and administrative and executive powers in the region, but only in routine matters; more critical decisions were made in Lima. This situation led to a competitive attitude and the reputation of Upper Peru for assertiveness, a condition reinforced by the economic importance of the region.

Spain exercised its control of smaller administrative units in the colonies through royal officials, such as the corregidor, who represented the king in the municipal governments that their citizens elected. By the early 17th century there were four corregidores in Upper Peru.

In the late 18th century, Spain undertook an administrative reform to increase the crown's revenues and eliminate many abuses. It created an intendancy system, giving extensive powers to highly qualified officials directly responsible to the king. In 1784, Spain established four intendancy districts in Upper Peru, covering the present-day departments of La Paz, Cochabamba, Potosí, and Chuquisaca.

The Spanish crown initially controlled the local governments indirectly but centralized procedures as time passed. At first, Viceroy Francisco de Toledo confirmed the rights of local nobles and guaranteed them local autonomy. But the crown eventually came to employ Spanish officials, corregidores de indios, to collect tribute and taxes from the Indians. Corregidores de indios also imported goods and forced the Indians to buy them, a widely abused practice that proved to be an enormous source of wealth for these officials but caused much resentment among the Indian population.

=== Religion ===
The University of San Francisco Xavier of Chuquisaca was Upper Peru's first university.

With the first Spanish settlers of Upper Peru came the secular and regular clergy to begin the conversion of the Indians to Christianity. In 1552, the first bishopric in Upper Peru was established in La Plata; in 1605, La Paz and Santa Cruz also became bishoprics. In 1623 the Jesuits established the Royal and Pontifical Higher University of San Francisco Xavier of Chuquisaca, Upper Peru's first university.

Although the official Incan religion disappeared rapidly, the Indians continued their local worship under the protection of local Indian rulers. However, as Christianity influenced the Indians, a new folk-Catholicism developed, incorporating symbols of the indigenous religion. The church was tolerant of local Indian religions. In 1582, for example, the bishop of La Plata permitted the Indians to build a sanctuary for the dark state of Our Lady of Copacabana on the shores of Lake Titicaca (Copacabana has been a traditional Aymara religious center ever since).

=== Situation of the Native peoples ===
The conquest and colonial rule were traumatic experiences for the Indians. Easily susceptible to European diseases, the native population decreased rapidly. The situation of the Indians worsened in the 18th century when Spain demanded higher tribute payments and increased mita obligations to increase the mining output.

These profound economic and social changes and the breakup of native culture contributed to the increasing alcoholism. Before the Spanish arrived, the Incas had consumed alcohol only during religious ceremonies. Indian use of the coca leaf also increased, and, according to one chronicler, at the end of the 16th century, "in Potosí alone, the trade in coca amounts to over half a million pesos a year, for 95,000 baskets of it are consumed."

Indian reaction to colonial rule and conversion to Christianity varied. Many Indians adapted to Spanish ways by breaking with their traditions and actively attempting to enter the market economy. They also used the courts to protect their interests, especially against new tribute assessments. Others clung to their customs as much as possible, and some rebelled against the white rulers.

== Native rebellions ==
Local, primarily uncoordinated, rebellions occurred throughout colonial rule. More than 100 revolts occurred in the 18th century alone in Bolivia and Peru. In contrast, early Indian rebellions were anti-Christian, and the revolts at the end of the sixteenth century were based in messianic Christian symbolism that was Roman Catholic and anti-Spanish.

Increasing Indian discontent with colonial rule sparked the great rebellion of Túpac Amaru II. Born José Gabriel Condorcanqui, this educated, Spanish-speaking Indian took the name of his ancestor, Túpac Amaru. During the 1770s, he became embittered over the harsh treatment of the Indians by the corregidores de indios. In November 1780, Túpac Amaru II and his followers seized and executed a particularly cruel corregidor de indios. Although Túpac Amaru II insisted that his movement was reformist and did not seek to overthrow Spanish rule, his demands included an autonomous region for natives. The uprising quickly became a full-scale revolt. Approximately 60,000 Indians in the Peruvian and Bolivian Andes rallied to the cause. After scoring some initial victories, including defeating a Spanish army of 1,200 men, Túpac Amaru II was captured and killed in May 1781; nonetheless, the revolt continued, primarily in Upper Peru. There, a supporter of Túpac Amaru II, the Indian chief Tomás Catari, had led an uprising in Potosí during the early months of 1780. Catari was killed by the Spaniards a month before Túpac Amaru II. Another major revolt was led by Julián Apaza, a sexton who took the names of the two rebel martyrs by calling himself Túpac Catari (also spelled Katari). He besieged La Paz for more than 100 days. Spain failed in putting down all of the revolts until 1783 and then proceeded to execute thousands of Indians.

== Growing Criollo dissent ==
In the late 18th century, a growing discontent with the Spanish rule developed among the criollos (persons of pure Spanish descent born in the New World). Criollos began to assume active roles in the economy, especially in mining and agricultural production, and thus resented the trade barriers established by the mercantilist policies of the Spanish crown. In addition, criollos were incensed that Spain reserved all upper-level administrative positions for peninsulares (Spanish-born persons residing in the New World).

The Enlightenment, emphasizing reason, questioning authority and tradition, and individualistic tendencies, also contributed to criollo discontent. The Inquisition had not kept the writings of Niccolò Machiavelli, Benjamin Franklin, Thomas Paine, Jean-Jacques Rousseau, John Locke, and others out of Spanish America; their ideas were often discussed by criollos, especially those educated at the university in Chuquisaca. At first, the criollos of Upper Peru were influenced by the French Revolution, but they eventually rejected it as too violent. Although Upper Peru was fundamentally loyal to Spain, the ideas of the Enlightenment and independence from Spain continued to be discussed by scattered groups of radicals.
