= Khunurana (Bolivia) =

Mountain in Bolivia

- Location within Bolivia

Highest point
- Elevation: 5,071 m (16,637 ft)
- Coordinates: 19°48′S 65°39′W

Geography
- Location: Bolivia, Potosí Department
- Parent range: Andes, Potosí mountain range

Khunurana (Aymara for a variety of potato of the qhini group, hispanicized spelling Cunurana) is a mountain in the Andes of Bolivia located about 20 km south of Potosí in the Potosí Department in the north of the José María Linares Province. It is the highest peak in the Potosí mountain range rising to 5,071 m (16,637 ft).

Khunurana lies southeast of the mountain Hundimiento, between the lake Santa Catalina and Mount Q'umir Qucha in the west and the Yana Urqu ridge in the east. The two small lakes north of it are Q'umir Qucha and Muyu Qucha.

== See also ==
- Jatun Mayu
