= Q'illu Q'asa (Bolivia) =

Mountain in Bolivia

- Location within Bolivia

Highest point
- Elevation: 4,960 m (16,270 ft)
- Coordinates: 19°40′03″S 65°40′53″W

Geography
- Location: Bolivia; Potosí Department
- Parent range: Andes, Potosí mountain range

Q'illu Q'asa (Quechua q'illu yellow, q'asa mountain pass, "yellow mountain pass", hispanicized spelling Quellu Casa) is a mountain in the Potosí mountain range of the Bolivian Andes, about 4,960 m (16,273 ft) high. It is situated in the Potosí Department, southeast of Potosí. Q'illu Q'asa lies near Q'illu Urqu.
