= Collpacaca (Marcapata) =

Mountain in Peru

- Location within Peru

Highest point
- Elevation: 5,000 m (16,000 ft)
- Coordinates: 13°41′58″S 71°02′03″W

Geography
- Location: Peru, Cusco Region, Quispicanchi Province, Marcapata District
- Parent range: Andes, Vilcanota

Collpacaca (possibly from Quechua qullpa salty, salpeter, qaqa rock, "salpeter rock") is a mountain in the Vilcanota mountain range in the Andes of Peru, about 5,000 metres (16,404 ft) high. It is located in the Cusco Region, Quispicanchi Province, Marcapata District. It is situated northwest of Juchuy Ananta and northeast of Chumpe and Huiscachani. The Huiscachani River flows along its western slope.
