= Mount Q'umir Qucha (Bolivia) =

Mountain in Bolivia

Q'umir Qucha
- Location within Bolivia

Highest point
- Elevation: 5,020 m (16,470 ft)
- Coordinates: 19°47′11″S 65°39′59″W

Geography
- Location: Bolivia; Potosí Department
- Parent range: Andes, Anta Q'awa mountain range

Q'umir Qucha (Quechua q'umir green, qucha lake, "green lake", other spellings Comer Cocha, Khomer Khocha) is a mountain in the Bolivian Andes, about 5,020 m (16,470 ft) high. It is located in the Anta Q'awa mountain range, the southern part of the Potosí mountain range. Q'umir Qucha is situated south-east of Potosí in the Potosí Department, in the north of the José María Linares Province. Q'umir Qucha lies north-west of the mountain Khunurana and the Yana Urqu group and south-west of the mountain Anta Q'awa. The small lake Q'umir Qucha lies at its feet, east of it. The larger lake south of Q'umir Qucha is Santa Catalina.
