= José María Linares Province =

José María Linares
- Province
- Flag Seal

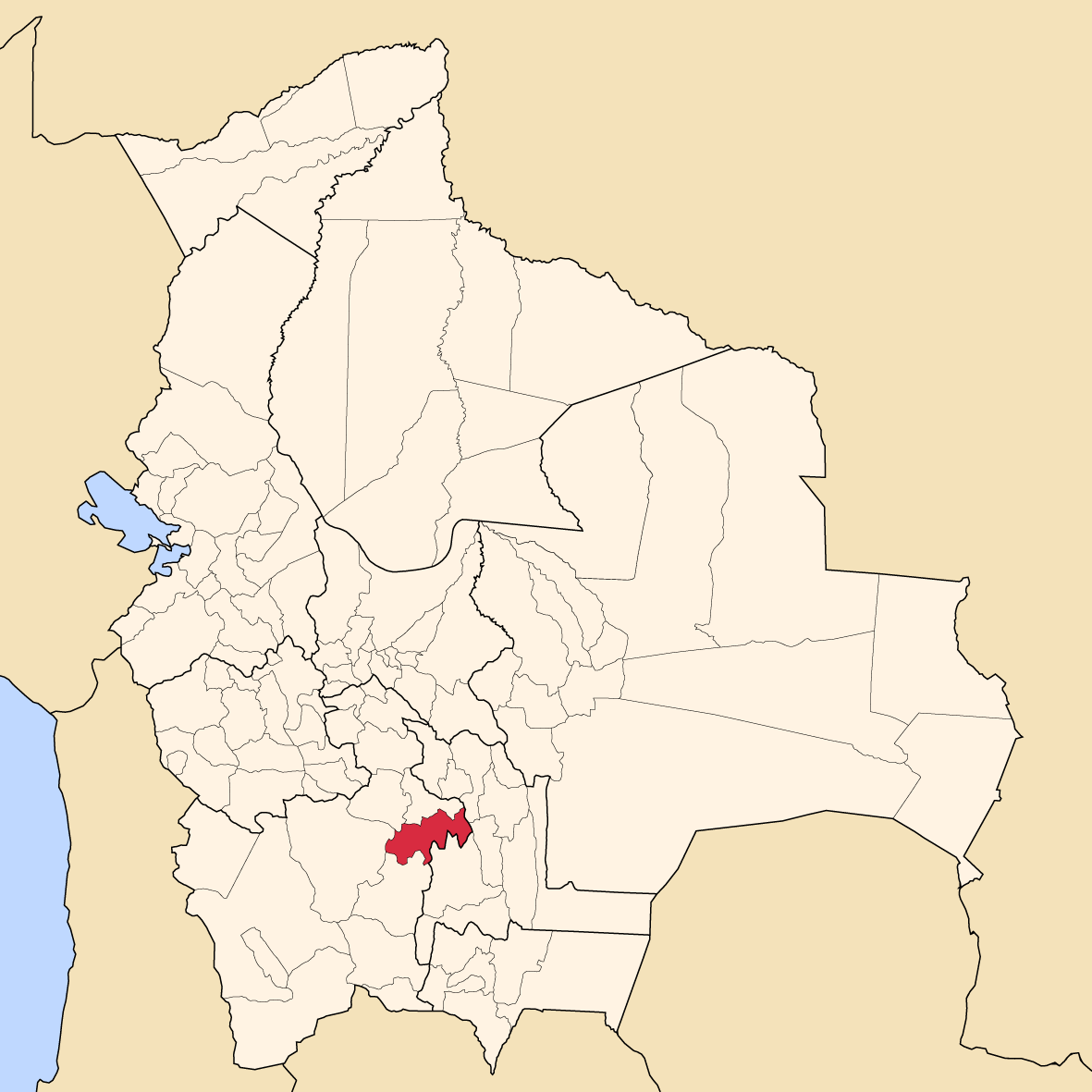
- Location of the José María Linares Province within Bolivia

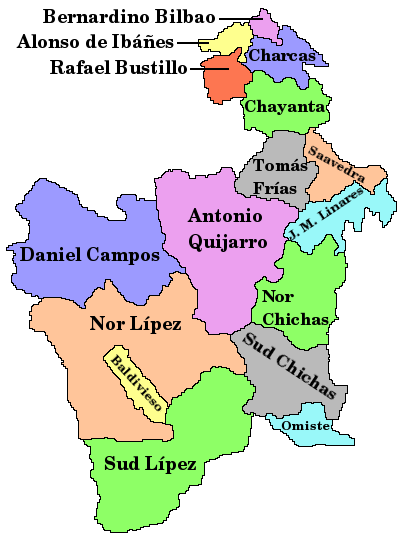
- Provinces of the Potosí Department
- Coordinates: 19°53′S 65°28′W
- Country: Bolivia
- Department: Potosí Department
- Municipalities: 3
- Capital: Puna

Area
  - Total: 1,870 sq mi (4,843 km^{2})

Population (2024 census)
  - Total: 43,542
  - Density: 23.29/sq mi (8.991/km^{2})
  - Ethnicities: Quechua
- Time zone: UTC-4 (BOT)
- Area code: BO.PO.JL

José María Linares is a province in the eastern parts of the Bolivian department of Potosí. Its capital is Puna.

== Location ==
José María Linares province is one of sixteen provinces in the Potosí Department. It is located between 19° 30' and 20° 16' South and between 64° 43' and 65° 53' West. It borders Cornelio Saavedra Province in the north, Tomás Frías Province in the northwest, Antonio Quijarro Province in the west, Nor Chichas Province in the south, and Chuquisaca Department in the east. The province extends over 120 km from east to west and 85 km from north to south.

== Geography ==
The Potosí mountain range traverses the province. One of the highest peaks of the province is Khunurana at 5,071 m (16,637 ft). Other mountains are listed below:

- Ch'aki Qucha
- Jatun Kunturiri
- Jatun Urqu
- Kimray Unu
- Kuntur Tuqlla
- Kura Puñusqa
- K'illi Mayu Punta
- Muru Wasi
- Puyachi
- Qanchis Kancha
- Q'illu Qaqa Punta
- Kunturiri
- Yana Mayu
- Yana Urqu
- Yuraq Kancha
- Yuraq Qaqa

== Division ==
The province comprises three municipalities which are further subdivided into cantons.

Section	Municipality	Seat
1st	Puna Municipality	Puna
2nd	Caiza "D" Municipality	Caiza "D"
3rd	Ckochas Municipality	Ckochas

Until August 15, 2006, when Ckochas Municipality was created, its three cantons, Turuchipa, Duraznos and Esquiri, belonged to the Puna Municipality.

== Population ==
The main language of the province is Quechua, spoken by 80%, while 44% of the population speak Spanish. The population dropped from 52,535 inhabitants (1992 census) to 50,899 (2001 census), a decrease of 2.1%.

90% of the population have no access to electricity, 89% have no sanitary facilities. 69% of the population are employed in agriculture, 0.5% in mining, 11% in industry, 20% in general services. 88% of the population are Catholics, 10% Protestants.

The people are predominantly indigenous citizens of Quechua descent.

Ethnic group	Puna Municipality and Ckochas Municipality (%)	Caiza "D" Municipality (%)
Quechua	95.1	94.5
Aymara	0.1	0.3
Guaraní, Chiquitos, Moxos	0.0	0.1
Not indigenous	4.6	5.1
Other indigenous groups	0.1	0.0

== See also ==
- Ch'aki Qucha
- Jatun Mayu
- T'ala Qucha
- T'uruchipa River
