= Yana Urqu (Mullu P'unqu) =

Mountain in Peru

- Location within Peru

Highest point
- Elevation: 4,800 m (15,700 ft)
- Coordinates: 13°38′25″S 70°47′26″W

Geography
- Location: Peru, Cusco Region, Quispicanchi Province, Marcapata District
- Parent range: Andes

Yana Urqu (Quechua yana black, urqu mountain, "black mountain", hispanicized spelling Yana Orjo) is a mountain in the Andes of Peru, about 4,800 metres (15,748 ft) high. It is situated in the Cusco Region, Quispicanchi Province, Marcapata District. It lies south of Qullpa Qaqa and southeast of a little lake named Mullu P'unqu.
