= Khari Khari Lakes =

Two connected artificial lakes in Bolivia

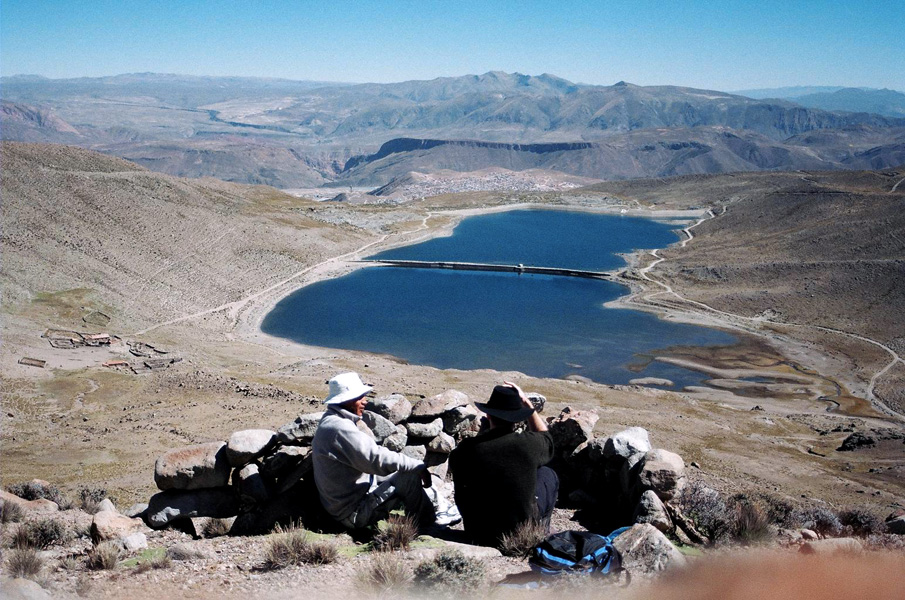
- Looking northwest from the Khari Khari range towards Potosí with the Khari Khari Lakes in the foreground

- Location within Bolivia Location within South America
- Interactive map of Khari Khari Lakes
- Location: Bolivia, Potosí Department
- Coordinates: 19°36′26″S 65°43′50″W
- Primary inflows: San Ildefonso River

The Khari Khari Lakes (Quechua khari khari a thorny medical plant, a species of rubus, hispanicized spellings Cari Cari, Kari Kari, Kari-Kari) are two closely connected artificial lakes, San Ildefonso and San Pablo (now integrated into San Ildefonso) situated in the Khari Khari mountain range of Bolivia. The lakes lie about 8 km east of Potosí in the Potosí Department, Tomás Frías Province, Potosí Municipality, northeast of the lakes named San Sebastián and Planilla which are also artificial lakes.

== See also ==
- Khari Khari
