= Jomercocha (Camanti) =

Lake in Peru

- Location within Peru
- Location: Peru; Cusco Region
- Coordinates: 13°31′50″S 70°46′08″W
- Surface elevation: 3,900 m (12,800 ft)

Jomercocha (possibly from Quechua q'umir green, qucha lake, "green lake") is a lake in Peru located in the Cusco Region, Quispicanchi Province, Camanti District. It is situated at a height of about 3,900 metres (12,795 ft). Jomercocha lies north of the mountain Vizcachani, near the Ajocunca.
