= Kimsa Waylla =

Mountain in Bolivia

- Location within Bolivia

Highest point
- Elevation: 4,980 m (16,340 ft)
- Coordinates: 19°36′26″S 65°40′12″W

Geography
- Location: Bolivia; Potosí Department
- Parent range: Andes, Khari Khari mountain range

Kimsa Waylla (Quechua kimsa three, waylla meadow, "three meadows", Hispanicized spelling Quimsa Huaylla) is a mountain group in the Andes of Bolivia in the Potosí Department, Tomás Frías Province, about 4,980 m (16,339 ft) high. It is located in the Khari Khari mountain range east of Potosí. The name derives from Quechua words where kimsa translates to "three" and wayla translates to "meadow", collectively meaning "three meadows." The group lies in the east of the range at the end of the Idelfonso valley. It is situated near the Qhispi Llaqta stream, north-west of the mountains Illimani and Uma Jalanta and north-east of the mountains Wak'ani and Masuni.
