= Kimsa Kunturiri =

Mountain in Bolivia

- Location within Bolivia

Highest point
- Elevation: 5,020 m (16,470 ft)
- Coordinates: 19°35′30″S 65°40′12″W

Geography
- Location: Bolivia, Potosí Department
- Parent range: Andes, Khari Khari mountain range

Kimsa Kunturiri (Aymara and Quechua kimsa three, kunturi condor, -ri a suffix, hispanicized spelling Quimsa Condoriri) is a group of three mountains in the Andes of Bolivia in the Potosí Department at the border of Tomás Frías Province and Cornelio Saavedra Province. The peaks are about 5,020 m, 4,980 m and 4,960 m high. The Kimsa Kunturiri group is situated in the Khari Khari mountain range east of Potosí. It lies north of the Kimsa Waylla group, between the lakes Jatun Wak'ani (Jatun Huacani) and Juch'uy Wak'ani (Juchuy Huacani) in the west and the Jatun Tiyu Lakes in the east.
