= Q'illu Urqu (Tomás Frías) =

Mountain in Bolivia

- Location within Bolivia

Highest point
- Elevation: 4,960 m (16,270 ft)
- Coordinates: 19°39′54″S 65°40′13″W

Geography
- Location: Bolivia; Potosí Department
- Parent range: Andes, Potosí mountain range

Q'illu Urqu (Quechua q'illu yellow, urqu mountain, "yellow mountain", also spelled Khellu Orkho, Quellu Orco) is a mountain in the Potosí mountain range of the Bolivian Andes, about 4,960 m (16,273 ft) high. It is situated south east of Potosí in the Potosí Department. Q'illu Urqu lies southwest of Illimani at Challwiri Lake and near Q'illu Q'asa.
