= Yana Urqu (Alis-Laraos) =

Mountain in Peru

- Location within Peru

Highest point
- Elevation: 4,800 m (15,700 ft)
- Coordinates: 12°20′03″S 75°43′07″W

Geography
- Location: Peru, Lima Region
- Parent range: Andes, Cordillera Central

Yana Urqu (Quechua yana black, urqu mountain, "black mountain", also spelled Yana Orco) is mountain in the Cordillera Central in the Andes of Peru which reaches a height of approximately 4,800 metres (15,748 ft). It is located in the Lima Region, Yauyos Province, on the border of the districts of Alis and Laraos.
