= Quehuesiri (Marcapata) =

Mountain in Peru

- Location within Peru

Highest point
- Elevation: 5,300 m (17,400 ft)
- Coordinates: 13°39′30″S 71°03′41″W

Geography
- Location: Peru, Cusco Region
- Parent range: Andes, Vilcanota

Quehuesiri (possibly from Aymara q'iwisiña to fight, -ri a suffix, "fighter") is a mountain in the Vilcanota mountain range in the Andes of Peru, about 5,300 metres (17,388 ft) high. It is located in the Cusco Region, Quispicanchi Province, Marcapata District. It lies west of the peak of Quinsachata.
