= Yana Urqu (Linares) =

Mountain in Bolivia

- Location within Bolivia

Highest point
- Elevation: 4,860 m (15,940 ft)
- Coordinates: 19°48′02″S 65°38′17″W

Geography
- Location: Bolivia; Potosí Department
- Parent range: Andes, Anta Q'awa mountain range

Yana Urqu (Quechua yana black, urqu mountain, "black mountain", other spellings Yana Orco, Yana Orkho) is a mountain in the Anta Q'awa mountain range of the Bolivian Andes, about 4,860 m (15,945 ft) high. It is situated south-east of Potosí in the Potosí Department, in the north of the José María Linares Province. Yana Urqu lies south-east and east of the mountains Q'umir Qucha and Khunurana.

== See also ==
- Jatun Kunturiri
