= Jatun Kunturiri =

Mountain in Bolivia

- Location within Bolivia

Highest point
- Elevation: 5,008 m (16,430 ft)
- Coordinates: 19°43′12″S 65°38′13″W

Geography
- Location: Bolivia, Potosí Department
- Parent range: Andes, Potosí mountain range

Jatun Kunturiri (Quechua hatun, in Bolivia always jatun big, great, Aymara kunturi condor, -ri Aymara suffix, hispanicized spellings Jatun Condoriri, Jatún Condoriri) is a mountain in the Potosí mountain range of the Bolivian Andes, about 5,008 m (16,430 ft) high. It is situated south-east of Potosí in the Potosí Department, José María Linares Province, in the south-west of the Puna Municipality. It lies between the Sip'uruni River in the north and the Khunurana in the south, north-west of the lake T'ala Qucha and the village Talaco.

== See also ==
- Yana Urqu
