= Jatun Mayu (Linares) =

- Etymology: Quechua

Location
- Country: Bolivia
- Region: Potosí Department, Antonio Quijarro Province, José María Linares Province, Tomás Frías Province

Physical characteristics
- Source
  - location: Potosí Municipality Municipality
  - coordinates: 19°44′50″S 65°44′14″W
- Mouth
  - coordinates: 20°18′46″S 65°40′26″W

Jatun Mayu (Quechua hatun, jatun big, great, mayu river, "great river") which downstream successively is named Challajtiri Mayu, Rosario, Agua Castilla, Jatun Mayu again and Qaysa is a Bolivian river in the provinces of Antonio Quijarro, José María Linares and Tomás Frías of the Potosí Department. It belongs to the Pillku Mayu river basin.

The Jatun Mayu originates near the villages of Ollerias and La Esquina in the Potosí Municipality of the Tomás Frías Province. At first its direction is to the northwest. It flows along the village of Challwiri (Challviri) in a western direction. Near Walla Laqaya (Hualla Lacaya) it receives the name Challajtiri Mayu. Southwest of Jatun Ch'utu it turns to the southeast. Near the village of Rosario in the Porco Municipality of the Antonio Quijarro Province it gets the name Rosario. Before it reaches the village of Karma (or Carma) it is named Agua Castilla. After the confluence with the Topala River in the Caiza "D" Municipality of the José María Linares Province near the village of Jirinchura at 19°54′09″S 65°47′05″W it is called Jatun Mayu again. Its directions is mainly to the southeast. After receiving waters from the Horno Mayu or Qaysa, a left tributary which originates southeast of Cucho Ingenio, the river gets the name Qaysa (Caiza). It is a left tributary of the Tumusla River.
