= Yana Urqu (Yayamari) =

Mountain in Peru

- Location within Peru

Highest point
- Elevation: 5,000 m (16,000 ft)
- Coordinates: 13°44′28″S 70°57′35″W

Naming
- Language of name: Quechua

Geography
- Location: Peru, Cusco Region, Quispicanchi Province
- Parent range: Andes, Willkanuta

Yana Urqu (Quechua yana black, urqu mountain, "black mountain", Hispanicized spelling Yanaorjo) is a mountain in the Willkanuta mountain range in the Andes of Peru, about 5,000 metres (16,404 ft) high. It is situated in the Cusco Region, Quispicanchi Province, Marcapata District. Yana Urqu lies southwest of the mountain Q'illu Wallayuq and northeast of Yayamari.
