= Qanchis Kancha (Bolivia) =

Mountain in Bolivia

- Location within Bolivia

Highest point
- Elevation: 4,500 m (14,800 ft)
- Coordinates: 19°56′34″S 65°52′00″W

Geography
- Location: Bolivia, Potosí Department
- Parent range: Andes

Qanchis Kancha (Quechua qanchis seven, kancha corral, "seven corrals", also spelled Kanchis Kancha, Kanchiskancha) is a mountain in the Bolivian Andes which reaches a height of approximately 4,500 m (14,800 ft). It is located in the Potosí Department, José María Linares Province, Caiza "D" Municipality. The K'illi Mayu originates east of the mountain. It flows to the Uqururu Mayu in the northeast.
