= Yuraq Kancha (Bolivia) =

Mountain in Bolivia

- Location within Bolivia

Highest point
- Elevation: 4,500 m (14,800 ft)
- Coordinates: 19°58′24″S 65°52′26″W

Geography
- Location: Bolivia, Potosí Department
- Parent range: Andes

Yuraq Kancha (Quechua yuraq white, kancha enclosure, enclosed place, yard, a frame, or wall that encloses, also spelled Yuraj Cancha) is a mountain in the Bolivian Andes which reaches a height of approximately 4,500 m (14,800 ft). It is located in the Potosí Department, José María Linares Province, Caiza "D" Municipality. Yuraq Kancha lies northeast of K'illi Mayu Punta. The K'illi Mayu originates south of the mountain. It flows to the Uqururu Mayu in the northeast.
