= Q'umirqucha (Q'umir Qucha) =

Lake in Peru

- Location within Peru
- Location: Peru; Cusco Region
- Coordinates: 13°39′16″S 70°44′29″W
- Max. length: 0.54 km (0.34 mi)
- Max. width: 0.36 km (0.22 mi)
- Surface elevation: 4,550 m (14,930 ft)

Q'umirqucha or Q'umir Qucha (Quechua q'umir green, qucha lake, "green lake", Hispanicized spelling Jomercocha) is a lake in Peru located in the Cusco Region, Quispicanchi Province, Marcapata District. It is situated at a height of about 4,550 metres (14,928 ft). Q'umirqucha lies south-east of the mountain Wisk'achani and the larger lake Warusqucha, north-east of the village Q'umir Qucha (Ccomer Cocha).
