= Aquichua =

Mountain in Peru

- Location within Peru

Highest point
- Elevation: 5,300 m (17,400 ft)
- Coordinates: 13°40′32″S 70°59′00″W

Geography
- Location: Peru, Cusco Region
- Parent range: Andes, Vilcanota

Aquichua (possibly from Aymara, jaqhi precipice, cliff, Aymara and Quechua chuwa plate, "cliff plate") is a mountain in the Vilcanota mountain range in the Andes of Peru, about 5,300 metres (17,388 ft) high. It is located in the Cusco Region, Quispicanchi Province, Marcapata District. Aquichua is situated north east of the lake Sibinacocha and the mountain Chumpe and north of the Yayamari.

== See also ==
- Quinsachata
