= Illimani (Potosí) =

Mountain in Bolivia

- Location within Bolivia

Highest point
- Elevation: 5,030 m (16,500 ft)
- Coordinates: 19°38′00″S 65°39′52″W

Geography
- Location: Bolivia; Potosí Department
- Parent range: Andes, Khari Khari mountain range

Illimani is a mountain in the Khari Khari mountain range of the Bolivian Andes, about 5,030 m (16,503 ft) high. It is situated south-east of Potosí in the Potosí Department, Tomás Frías Province, Potosí Municipality. Illimani lies south-west of the mountain Uma Jalanta, north-east of Challwiri Lake and north of Illimani Lake.

== See also ==
- Kimsa Waylla
