= Quinsachata (Quispicanchi) =

Mountain in Peru

- Location within Peru

Highest point
- Elevation: 5,442 m (17,854 ft)
- Coordinates: 13°39′36″S 71°02′47″W

Geography
- Location: Peru, Cusco Region
- Parent range: Andes, Vilcanota

Climbing
- First ascent: 1-1969 via E. face to shoulder of N. ridge

Quinsachata (possibly from Aymara and Quechua kimsa three, Pukina chata mountain, "three mountains") is a mountain in the Vilcanota mountain range in the Andes of Peru, about 5,442 metres (17,854 ft) high. It is located in the Cusco Region, Quispicanchi Province, Marcapata District. Quinsachata is situated north of the lake Singrenacocha, northeast of the mountain Chumpe and northwest of the Aquichua.
