= Vizcachani (Camanti-Marcapata) =

Mountain in Peru

- Location within Peru

Highest point
- Elevation: 5,000 m (16,000 ft)
- Coordinates: 13°36′16″S 70°46′29″W

Geography
- Location: Peru
- Parent range: Andes, Urubamba

Vizcachani (possibly from Aymara wisk'acha viscacha, -ni a nominal suffix to indicate ownership, "the one with viscacha") is a mountain in the Urubamba mountain range in the Andes of Peru, about 5,000 metres (16,404 ft) high. It is located in the Cusco Region, Quispicanchi Province, in the districts Camanti and Marcapata. Vizcachani is situated between the lake Jomercocha in the north and the lakes Huaroscocha and Suirococha in the south.
