= Wila Salla (disambiguation) =

Wila Salla is a mountain in Peru.

Wila Salla may also refer to:

- Wila Salla (Bolivia), a mountain in the Potosí Department, Bolivia
- Wila Salla (Oruro), a mountain in the Oruro Department, Bolivia
- Wila Salla (Oruro-Potosí), a mountain in the Oruro Department and in the Potosí Department, Bolivia
