= Jatun Qaqa =

Mountain in Bolivia

- Location within Bolivia

Highest point
- Elevation: 4,220 m (13,850 ft)
- Coordinates: 19°28′45″S 65°50′41″W

Geography
- Location: Bolivia, Potosí Department
- Parent range: Andes

Jatun Qaqa (Quechua jatun, hatun big, qaqa rock, "big rock", also spelled Jatun Khakha) is a mountain in the Bolivian Andes which reaches a height of approximately 4,220 m (13,850 ft). It is located in the Potosí Department, Tomás Frías Province, Yocalla Municipality. It lies between Wayra Wasi in the east and Jatun Q'asa in the west.
