= Jach'a Q'awa =

Mountain in Bolivia

- Location within Bolivia

Highest point
- Elevation: 4,718 m (15,479 ft)
- Coordinates: 19°17′13″S 66°01′24″W

Geography
- Location: Bolivia, Potosí Department, Tomás Frías Province
- Parent range: Andes

Jach'a Q'awa (Aymara jach'a big, q'awa little river, ditch, crevice, fissure, gap in the earth, "big brook" or "big ravine", Hispanicized spelling Jachcha Khaua) is a 4,718-metre-high (15,479 ft) mountain in the Cordillera de los Frailes in the Andes of Bolivia. It is situated in the Potosí Department, Tomás Frías Province, Tinguipaya Municipality, north of the Pillku Mayu (red river"). It lies southeast of the village of Janq'u Laqaya (Jankho Lacaya) and the mountain named Janq'u Laqaya (Jhanco Lacaya) and northwest of Pari Chata.

The river Jach'a Q'awa originates on the west side of the mountain. It flows to the south.
