= Pari Urqu =

Mountain in Bolivia

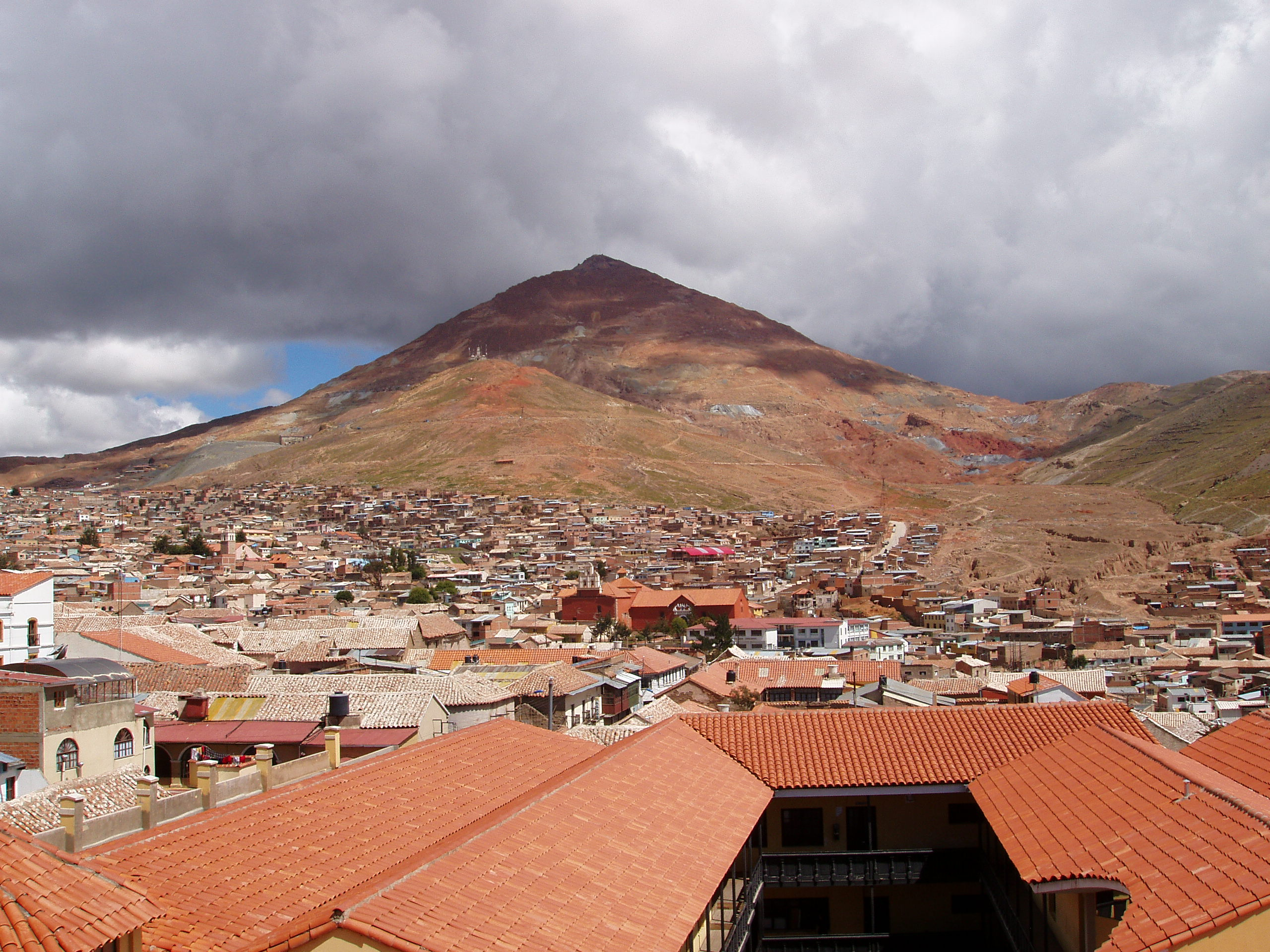
- Potosí with the mountains Pari Urqu and Cerro Rico or P'utuqsi Urqu in the background

Highest point
- Elevation: 3,950 m (12,960 ft)
- Coordinates: 19°35′S 65°45′W

Geography
- Location within Bolivia
- Location: Bolivia, Potosí Department, Tomás Frías Province
- Parent range: Andes

Pari Urqu (Aymara pari red hot, Quechua pari warm, to get very hot, overheated, urqu mountain, "hot mountain", hispanicized spellings Pari Orcko, Pary Orcko, Pari Orco) is a mountain in the Andes in Bolivia, about 3,950 m (12,959 ft) high. It is located in the Potosí Department, Tomás Frías Province, Potosí Municipality. Pari Urqu lies in the west of Potosí, north west of the higher Cerro Rico (Spanish name), P'utuqsi Urqu or Sumaq Urqu (Quechua names) which lies in the south of Potosí.

There is a tower on the top of Pari Urqu which has a revolving restaurant to give a 360 degree view of the town.

== See also ==
- Jayaq Mayu
