= Kuntur Nasa =

Kuntur Nasa may refer to:

- Kuntur Nasa (Oruro), a mountain in the Challapata Municipality, Oruro Department, Bolivia
- Kuntur Nasa (Potosí), a mountain in the Yocalla Municipality, Potosí Department, Bolivia
