= Orco (disambiguation) =

Orco is an Italian river.

Orco may also refer to:

- ORCO, French real estate development company
- Orco Valley (Italian: Valle dell'Orco), is a valley in the Piedmont region of northern Italy located in the Graian Alps
- Orco Feglino, comune in the Province of Savona in the Italian region Liguria
- Odorant receptor co-receptor (Or83b), also known as Orco
- Orco (Donkey Kong), a fictional character from Donkey Kong Jungle Beat

== See also ==
- Orko (disambiguation)
- Orcus (disambiguation)
- Oreco (1932–1985)
