= T'ula Qullu (Potosí) =

Mountain in Bolivia

- Location within Bolivia

Highest point
- Elevation: 4,560 m (14,960 ft)
- Coordinates: 19°40′40″S 65°46′00″W

Geography
- Location: Bolivia, Potosí Department
- Parent range: Andes

T'ula Qullu (Aymara t'ula wood, burning material, qullu mountain, "wood mountain", also spelled Thola Khollu) is a mountain in the Bolivian Andes which reaches a height of approximately 4,560 m (14,960 ft). It is located in the Potosí Department, Tomás Frías Province, Potosí Municipality. It lies southwest of Cerro Rico and east of Qutaña Qullu.
