= Wila Sirka =

Wila Sirka (Aymara wila blood, blood-red, sirka vein of the body or a mine, "red vein", also spelled Vila Serca, Vila Sirca, Vilacirca, Wila Sirca) may refer to:

- Wila Sirka (Oruro), a mountain in the Oruro Department, Bolivia
- Wila Sirka (Peru), a mountain in the Cusco Region, Peru
- Wila Sirka (Potosí), a mountain in the Potosí Department, Bolivia
