= Achakanani =

Mountain in Bolivia

- Location within Bolivia

Highest point
- Elevation: 3,980 m (13,060 ft)
- Coordinates: 19°27′13″S 65°43′05″W

Geography
- Location: Bolivia, Potosí Department
- Parent range: Andes

Achakanani (Aymara achakana pearl-fruit, -ni a suffix, "the one with the pearl-fruit", also spelled Achacanani) is a mountain in the Bolivian Andes which reaches a height of approximately 3,980 m (13,060 ft). It is located in the Potosí Department, Tomás Frías Province, Potosí Municipality. It lies near the village of Q'illu Mayu, northeast of Lik'ichiri. The Q'illu Mayu ("yellow river") flows along its eastern slopes.
