= Waylla =

Waylla may refer to:

- Waylla (Bolivia-Chile)
- Waylla Tira
