= Jayaq Mayu =

- Etymology: Quechua

Location
- Country: Bolivia
- Region: Potosí Department

Physical characteristics
- Source: Cerro Rico
  - location: Potosí Municipality
- Mouth: Agua Dulce River
  - location: Yocalla Municipality

Jayaq Mayu (Quechua jaya pungency, locoto, mayu river, -q a suffix, "spicy river", hispanicized spelling Jayac Mayu) is a Bolivian river in the Potosí Department, Tomás Frías Province, in the south of Potosí. It originates on the west side of the mountain Cerro Rico or P'utuqsi Urqu located in the Potosí Municipality. Then it flows in a north west direction until meeting Agua Dulce River in the Yocalla Municipality. This river shortly afterwards forms the Tarapaya River at its confluence with Ribera de la Vera Cruz. Jayaq Mayu belongs to the Pillku Mayu drainage basin.
