= Ch'aki Mayu (Potosí) =

- Etymology: Quechua

Location
- Country: Bolivia
- Region: Potosí Department
- Municipality: Cornelio Saavedra Province, Tómas Frías Province; José María Linares Province

Basin features
- Tributaries
  - left: Tampu Mayu
  - right: Tehuarani, Qhispi Llaqta, Sip'uruni

Ch'aki Mayu (Quechua ch'aki dry, mayu river, "dry river", Hispanicized spellings Chaqui Mayu, Chaquí Mayu), also Kachi Mayu (Quechua kachi salt, "salt river", also spelled Cachi Mayu), is a Bolivian river in the Potosí Department. It flows towards the Pillku Mayu (Quechua for "red river").

Also known as Samasa, the river flows in a bow from west to east around the northern slopes of the Khari Khari mountain range along the village of Samasa. It flows from the Potosí Municipality, Tomás Frías Province, towards the Ch'aki Municipality, Cornelio Saavedra Province, now named Ch'aki Mayu or Kachi Mayu. Here its direction is mainly to the south. South of the village of Ch'aki it gets waters from the confluence of the streams named Tehuarani and Qhispi Llaqta and shortly afterwards from the Sip'uruni (Chipuruni). These streams come from the Khari Khari mountain range. Southwest of the village of Coipasi the Tampu Mayu coming from the north joins the river.

On its way through the Miculpaya Canton, José María Linares Province, the river receives the name Miculpaya. Before reaching the Pillku Mayu in the Betanzos Municipality, Cornelio Saavedra Province, it is known as Mataqa (Mataca). The confluence of the Mataqa River and the Pillku Mayu is northeast of Millares and Otuyo and about 38 km northeast of Betanzos.

== See also ==
- List of rivers of Bolivia
- Tarapaya
- T'uruchipa River
