= Wayra Wasi (Potosí-Yocalla) =

Mountain in Bolivia

- Location within Bolivia

Highest point
- Elevation: 4,208 m (13,806 ft)
- Coordinates: 19°28′36″S 65°49′50″W

Geography
- Location: Bolivia, Potosí Department
- Parent range: Andes

Wayra Wasi (Quechua wayra wind, wasi house, "wind house", also spelled Huayra Huasi) is a 4,208-metre-high (13,806 ft) mountain in the Bolivian Andes. It is located in the Potosí Department, Tomás Frías Province, at the border of the Potosí Municipality and the Yocalla Municipality, west of the village of Tarapaya.
