= Orko =

Orko may refer to:

- Orko (character), a fictional character from the Masters of the Universe franchise
- Orko (deity), a thunder god in some Iberian mythologies
- Orko Eloheim, an American hip hop artist
- Risto Orko, a Finnish film director
- Urqu Jawira (Aroma), a river in Bolivia also known as Orko Jahuira

== See also ==
- Chawpi Urqu (disambiguation), several mountains also spelled "Chaupi Orko"
- Orco (disambiguation)
