= Puka Urqu (Bolivia) =

Mountain in Bolivia

- Location within Bolivia

Highest point
- Elevation: 3,760 m (12,340 ft)
- Coordinates: 19°34′11″S 65°52′24″W

Geography
- Location: Bolivia, Potosí Department
- Parent range: Andes

Puka Urqu (Quechua puka red, urqu mountain, "red mountain", also spelled Puca Orkho) is a mountain in the Bolivian Andes which reaches a height of approximately 3,760 m (12,340 ft). It is located in the Potosí Department, Tomás Frías Province, Yocalla Municipality. Puka Urqu lies at the Ingenio Mayu north of Kunturiri.
