= Kuntur Nasa (Potosí) =

Mountain in Potosí Department, Bolivia

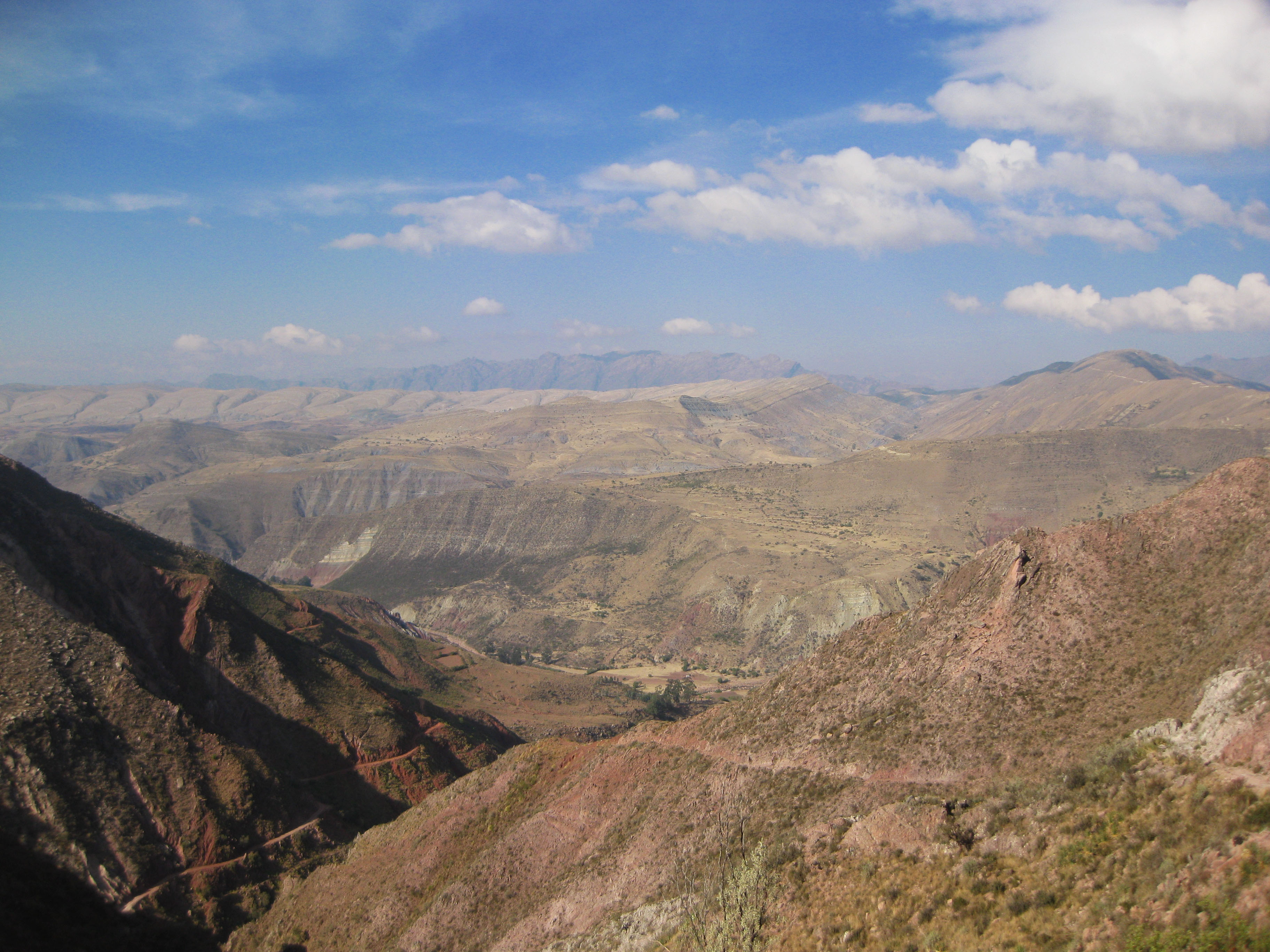
- Cordillera de los Frailes, looking west. Pari Chata is on the right in the background, left of it is the Pillku Mayu valley. Kuntur Nasa is partly visible behind Pari Chata (darker mountain on the left)

Highest point
- Elevation: 3,800 m (12,500 ft)
- Coordinates: 19°20′S 66°3′W

Geography
- Location within Bolivia
- Location: Bolivia, Potosí Department, Tomás Frías Province
- Parent range: Andes

Kuntur Nasa (Aymara kunturi condor, nasa nose, "nose of a condor", Hispanicized spelling Condor Nasa) is a mountain in the Andes in Bolivia, about 3.800 m (12,467 ft) high. It is located in the Cordillera de los Frailes in the Potosí Department, Tomás Frías Province, Yocalla Municipality, Kuntur Nasa lies south west of the higher Pari Chata at the river Pillku Mayu ("red river").
