= Chawpi Urqu (disambiguation) =

Chawpi Urqu (Quechua chawpi middle, center, urqu mountain, "middle mountain", also spelled Chaupi Orcco, Chaupi Orco, Chaupi Orjo, Chaupi Orkho, Chaupi Orko, Chupi Orco, Chupi Orko) may refer to:

- Chawpi Urqu, a mountain in the Apolobamba mountain range on the border of Bolivia and Peru
- Chawpi Urqu (Bolivia), a mountain in the La Paz Department, Bolivia
- Chawpi Urqu (Cangallo), a mountain in the Cangallo Province, Ayacucho Region, Peru
- Chawpi Urqu (Huanca Sancos), a mountain in the Huanca Sancos Province, Ayacucho Region, Peru
- Chawpi Urqu (Huancavelica), a mountain in the Huancavelica Region, Peru
- Chawpi Urqu (Potosí), a mountain in the Potosí Municipality, Tomás Frías Province, Potosí Department, Bolivia
- Chawpi Urqu (Yocalla), a mountain in the Yocalla Municipality, Tomás Frías Province, Potosí Department, Bolivia
