= Turini (Potosí) =

Mountain in Bolivia

- Location within Bolivia

Highest point
- Elevation: 4,040 m (13,250 ft)
- Coordinates: 19°30′05″S 65°43′22″W

Geography
- Location: Bolivia, Potosí Department
- Parent range: Andes

Turini (Aymara turi tower, -ni a suffix to indicate ownership, "the one with a tower", also spelled Torrini) is a mountain in the Bolivian Andes which reaches a height of approximately 4,040 m (13,250 ft). It is located in the Potosí Department, Tomás Frías Province, Potosí Municipality, northeast of the city of Potosí. It lies south of Lik'ichiri.
