= Pari Chata =

Mountain in Bolivia

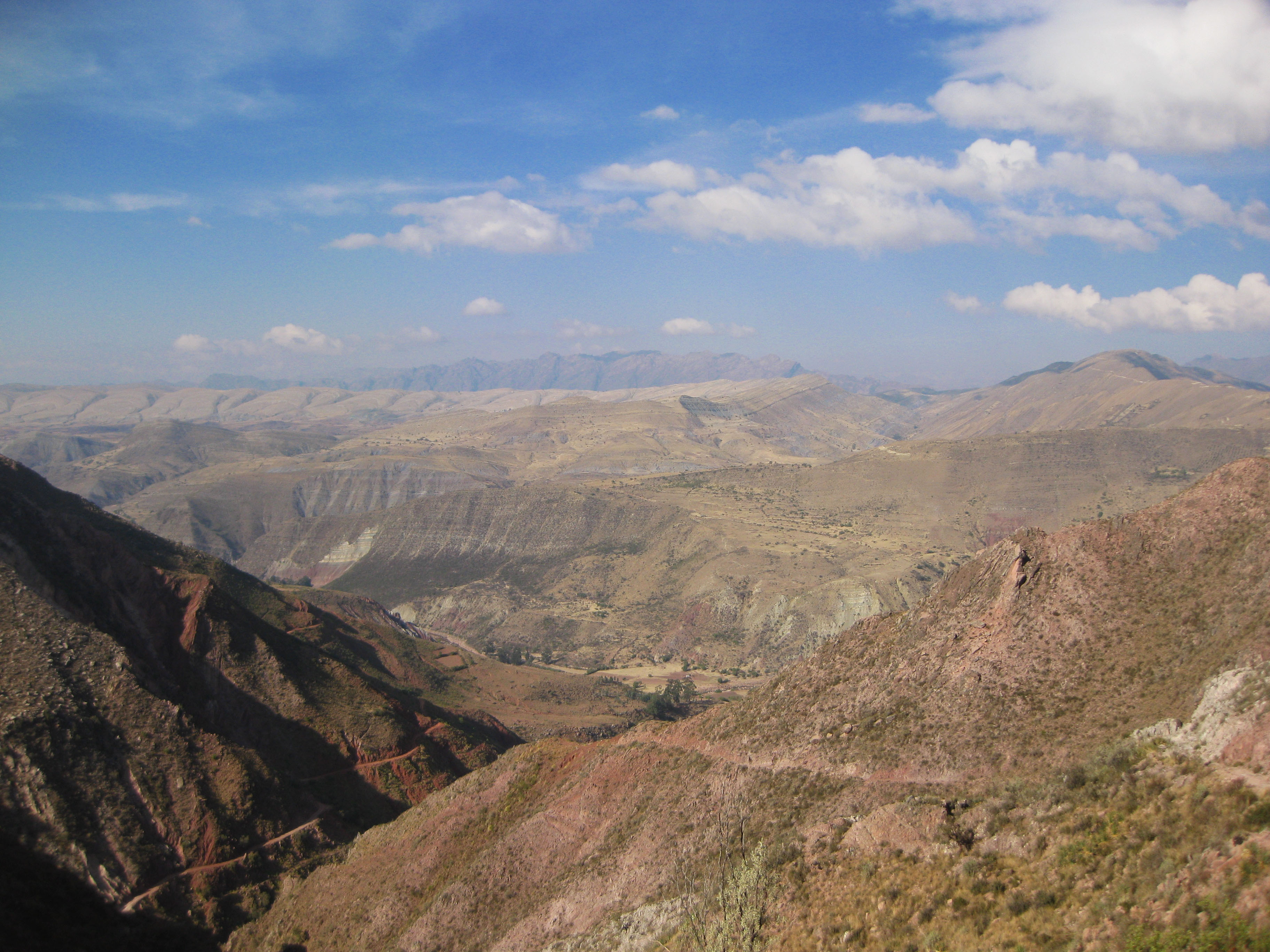
- Cordillera de los Frailes, looking west. Pari Chata is on the right in the background, left of it is the Pillku Mayu valley.

Highest point
- Elevation: 4,717 m (15,476 ft)
- Coordinates: 19°19′00″S 66°00′38″W

Geography
- Location within Bolivia
- Location: Bolivia, Potosí Department, Tomás Frías Province
- Parent range: Andes

Pari Chata (Aymara pari red hot, Pukina chata mountain, "red hot mountain", also spelled Parichata) is a 4,717-metre-high (15,476 ft) mountain in the Andes in Bolivia. It is located in the Cordillera de los Frailes in the Potosí Department, Tomás Frías Province, Yocalla Municipality, north of the river Pillku Mayu ("red river").

== See also ==
- Kuntur Nasa (Oruro)
