= Tarapaya Canton =

Tarapaya
- Canton
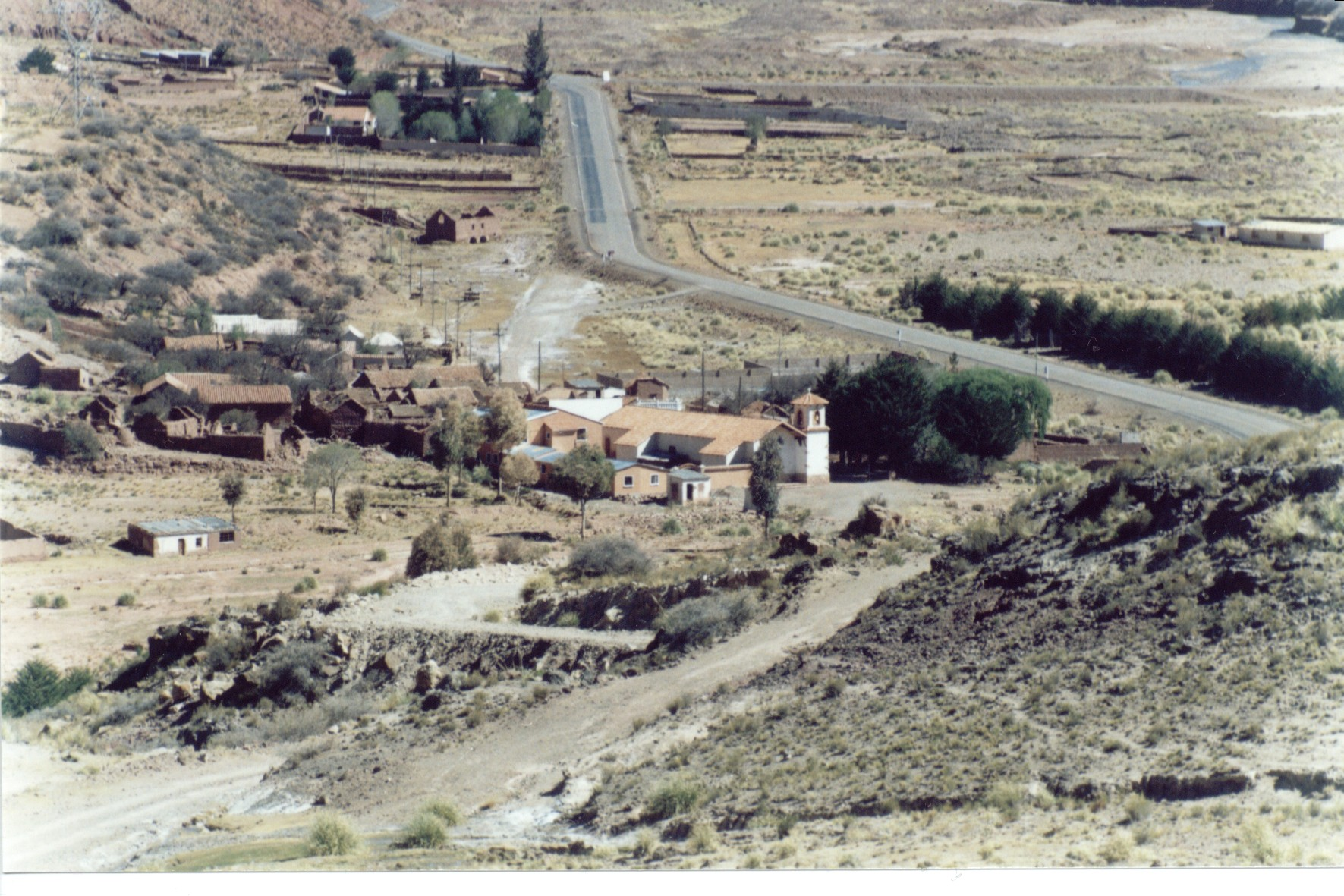
- The village of Tarapaya

- Location of Tarapaya within Bolivia
- Coordinates: 19°29′S 65°48′W
- Country: Bolivia
- Department: Potosí Department
- Province: Tomás Frías Province
- Municipality: Potosí Municipality
- Seat: Tarapaya
- Elevation: 10,945 ft (3,336 m)

Population (2001)
  - Total: 1,042
- Time zone: UTC-4 (BST)

Tarapaya is one of the cantons of the Potosí Municipality, the capital municipality of the Tomás Frías Province in the Potosí Department of Bolivia. During the census of 2001 it had 1,042 inhabitants. Its seat is Tarapaya with a population of 11 in 2001. It is situated east of Tarapaya River.

== Ojo del Inca ==
Being close to Potosí, the thermal springs called "Ojo del Inca" (Eye of the Inca) in Tarapaya are often visited by tourists.

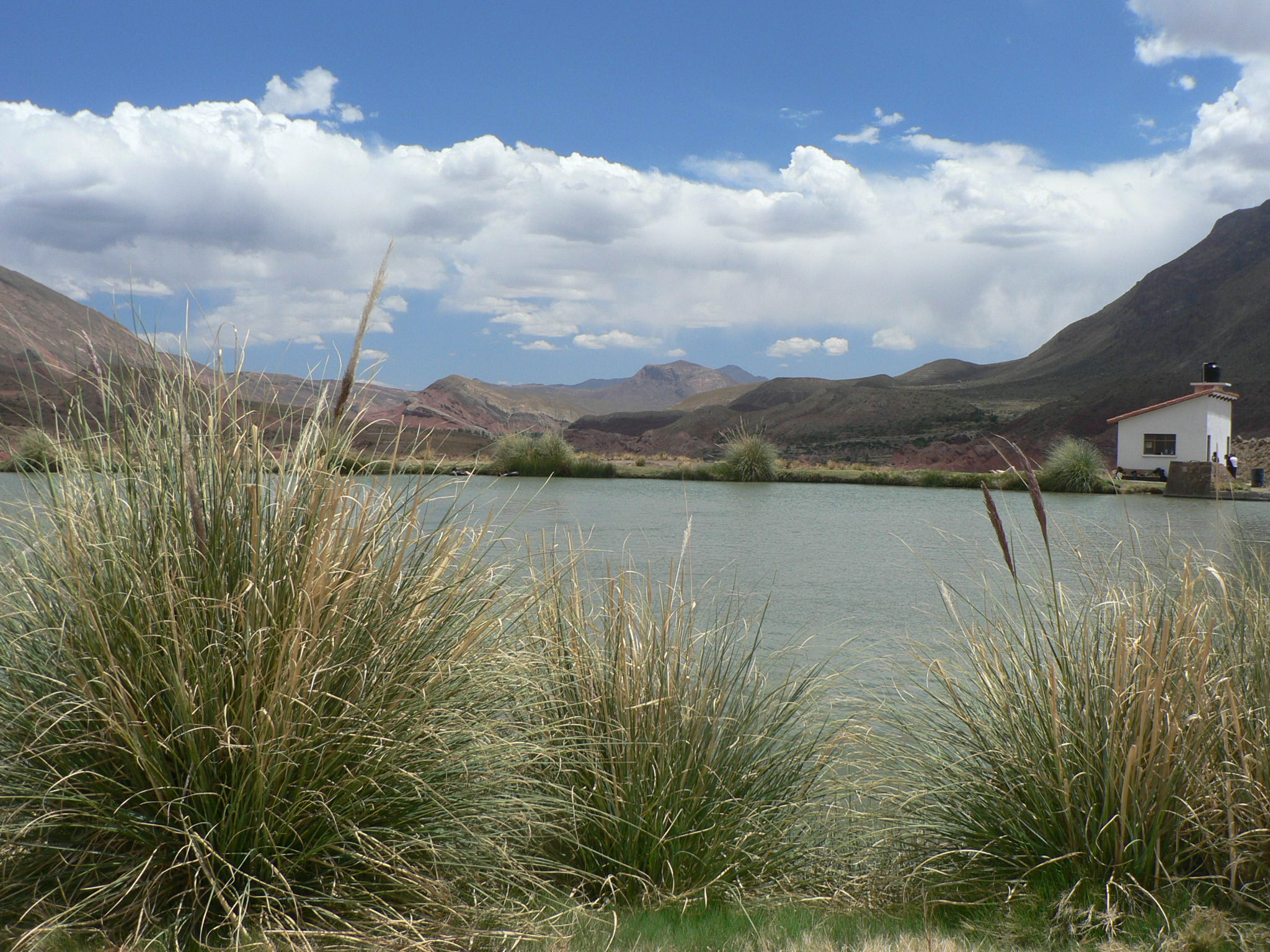
Ojo del Inca

== Climate ==
Climate data for Tarapaya, elevation 3,340 m (10,960 ft), (1976–2015)
Month	Jan	Feb	Mar	Apr	May	Jun	Jul	Aug	Sep	Oct	Nov	Dec	Year
Record high °C (°F)	31.0 (87.8)	31.2 (88.2)	30.2 (86.4)	29.8 (85.6)	29.9 (85.8)	25.9 (78.6)	25.4 (77.7)	27.0 (80.6)	29.0 (84.2)	33.4 (92.1)	33.6 (92.5)	33.8 (92.8)	33.8 (92.8)
Mean daily maximum °C (°F)	22.8 (73.0)	22.5 (72.5)	22.6 (72.7)	22.5 (72.5)	21.4 (70.5)	20.0 (68.0)	20.1 (68.2)	21.6 (70.9)	23.1 (73.6)	24.8 (76.6)	25.3 (77.5)	24.7 (76.5)	22.6 (72.7)
Daily mean °C (°F)	15.2 (59.4)	14.8 (58.6)	14.2 (57.6)	12.4 (54.3)	9.7 (49.5)	7.6 (45.7)	7.6 (45.7)	9.4 (48.9)	11.6 (52.9)	14.2 (57.6)	15.4 (59.7)	16.0 (60.8)	12.3 (54.2)
Mean daily minimum °C (°F)	7.7 (45.9)	7.1 (44.8)	5.8 (42.4)	2.3 (36.1)	−2.0 (28.4)	−4.8 (23.4)	−4.9 (23.2)	−2.8 (27.0)	0.1 (32.2)	3.6 (38.5)	5.6 (42.1)	7.4 (45.3)	2.1 (35.8)
Record low °C (°F)	0.0 (32.0)	−0.2 (31.6)	−2.5 (27.5)	−6.5 (20.3)	−9.7 (14.5)	−12.9 (8.8)	−11.0 (12.2)	−10.4 (13.3)	−13.4 (7.9)	−8.0 (17.6)	−5.9 (21.4)	−0.3 (31.5)	−13.4 (7.9)
Average precipitation mm (inches)	110.5 (4.35)	89.9 (3.54)	73.8 (2.91)	30.4 (1.20)	2.8 (0.11)	0.6 (0.02)	0.9 (0.04)	4.8 (0.19)	9.0 (0.35)	28.5 (1.12)	34.1 (1.34)	67.6 (2.66)	452.9 (17.83)
Average precipitation days	19.1	16.1	14.4	5.9	1.1	0.3	0.2	1.4	2.4	6.2	8.6	13.7	89.4
Average relative humidity (%)	69.3	67.9	65.7	65.7	56.6	55.4	57.0	55.2	56.8	57.8	59.8	62.8	60.8
Source: Servicio Nacional de Meteorología e Hidrología de Bolivia

== See also ==
- Lik'ichiri
