= Chawpi Urqu (Potosí) =

Mountain in Bolivia

- Location within Bolivia

Highest point
- Elevation: 4,460 m (14,630 ft)
- Coordinates: 19°23′51″S 65°35′51″W

Geography
- Location: Bolivia, Potosí Department
- Parent range: Andes

Chawpi Urqu (Quechua chawpi central, middle, urqu mountain, "central mountain", also spelled Chaupi Orkho) is a mountain in the Bolivian Andes which reaches a height of approximately 4,460 m (14,630 ft). It is located in the Potosí Department, Tomás Frías Province, Potosí Municipality. It lies southeast of Jatun Q'asa.
