= Urmiri Municipality =

- Municipality
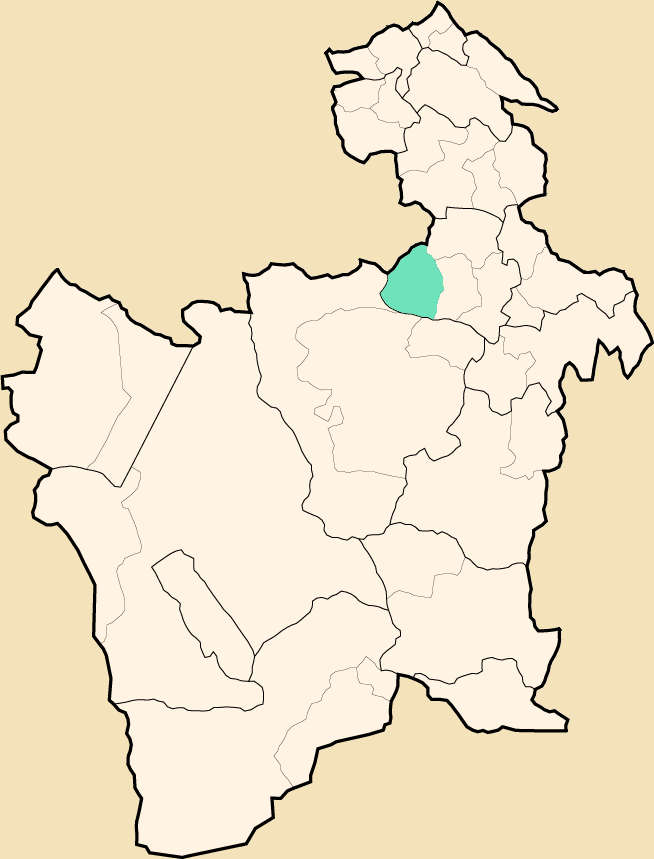
- Location within Potosí Department

- Location within Bolivia
- Coordinates: 19°30′S 66°10′W
- Country: Bolivia
- Department: Potosí Department
- Province: Tomás Frías Province
- Seat: Urmiri

Population (2001)
  - Total: 2,025
  - Ethnicities: Quechua Aymara
- Time zone: UTC-4 (BOT)

Urmiri Municipality is the third municipal section of the Tomás Frías Province in the Potosí Department in Bolivia. Its seat is Urmiri.

== Subdivision ==
The municipality consists of the following cantons:

- Cahuayo
- Urmiri

== The people ==
The people are predominantly indigenous citizens of Quechua and Aymara descent.

Ethnic group	%
Quechua	49.3
Aymara	46.6
Guaraní, Chiquitos, Moxos	0.0
Not indigenous	4.1
Other indigenous groups	0.1
