= Tinguipaya =

Coordinates: 19°13′S 65°50′W

- Town
- Interactive map of Tinguipaya
- Country: Bolivia
- Department: Potosí Department
- Province: Tomás Frías Province
- Municipality: Tinguipaya Municipality

Population (2001)
  - Total: 499
- Time zone: UTC-4 (BOT)

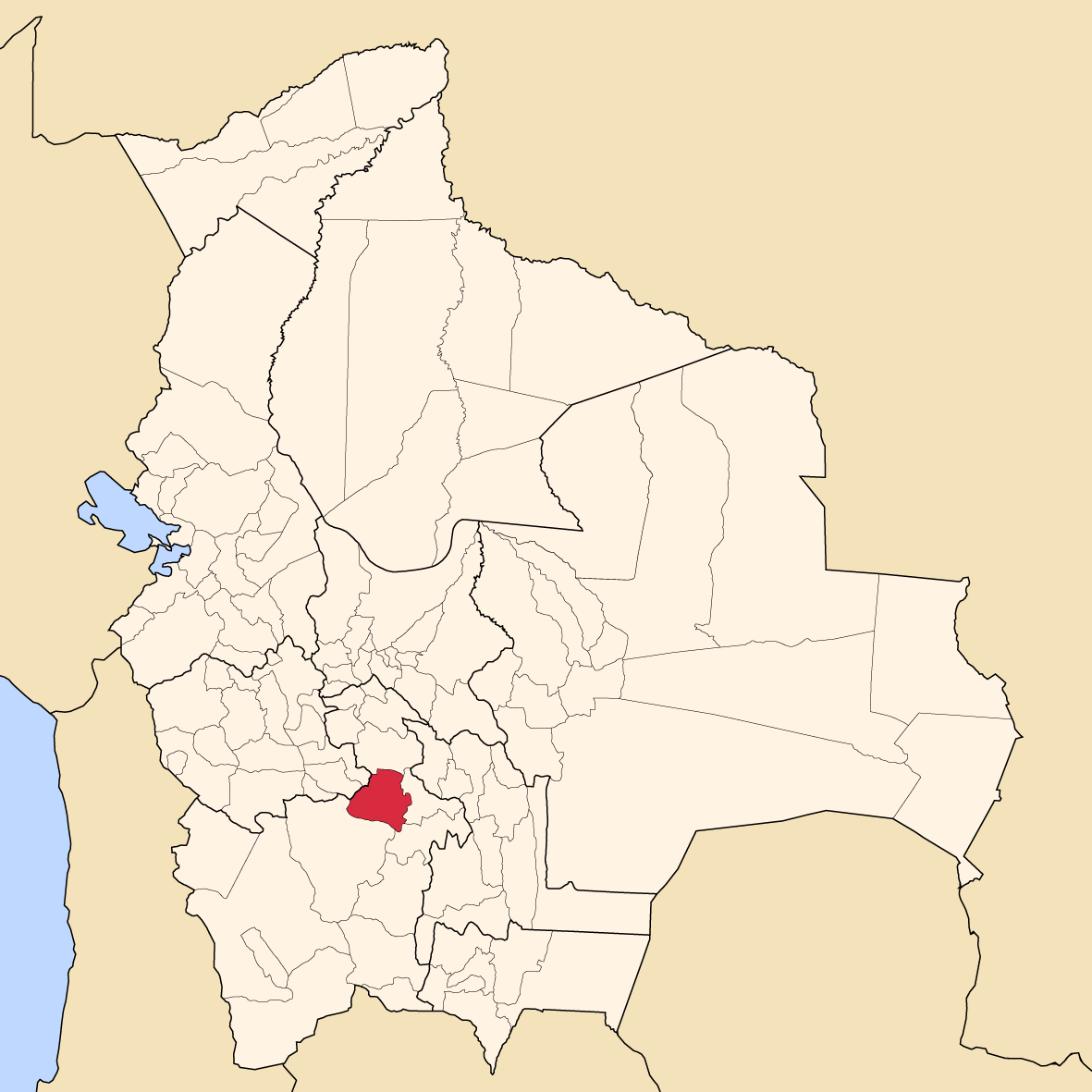
Map of Bolivia showing Tomás Frías Province (red highlight) where Tinguipaya is located

Tinguipaya is a small town in Bolivia, Potosí Department, Tomás Frías Province. It is the seat of the Tinguipaya Municipality.

== Climate ==
Climate data for Tinguipaya, elevation 3,200 m (10,500 ft), (1976–2007)
Month	Jan	Feb	Mar	Apr	May	Jun	Jul	Aug	Sep	Oct	Nov	Dec	Year
Mean daily maximum °C (°F)	21.2 (70.2)	21.4 (70.5)	22.0 (71.6)	22.7 (72.9)	21.8 (71.2)	20.6 (69.1)	20.0 (68.0)	21.3 (70.3)	22.5 (72.5)	23.5 (74.3)	23.3 (73.9)	22.7 (72.9)	21.9 (71.4)
Daily mean °C (°F)	14.6 (58.3)	14.6 (58.3)	14.7 (58.5)	14.3 (57.7)	12.2 (54.0)	10.1 (50.2)	9.8 (49.6)	11.7 (53.1)	13.2 (55.8)	14.8 (58.6)	15.2 (59.4)	15.3 (59.5)	13.4 (56.1)
Mean daily minimum °C (°F)	8.0 (46.4)	7.9 (46.2)	7.4 (45.3)	5.9 (42.6)	2.6 (36.7)	−0.4 (31.3)	−0.5 (31.1)	2.0 (35.6)	3.9 (39.0)	6.1 (43.0)	7.1 (44.8)	7.9 (46.2)	4.8 (40.7)
Average precipitation mm (inches)	145.6 (5.73)	120.6 (4.75)	83.4 (3.28)	27.6 (1.09)	2.8 (0.11)	1.4 (0.06)	1.8 (0.07)	9.7 (0.38)	12.7 (0.50)	34.2 (1.35)	52.9 (2.08)	96.3 (3.79)	589 (23.19)
Average precipitation days	16.4	13.0	11.2	4.6	0.9	0.4	0.7	1.6	2.4	6.2	7.0	11.1	75.5
Average relative humidity (%)	66.8	64.6	61.6	49.7	40.0	34.9	36.0	36.6	41.1	47.8	49.4	56.7	48.8
Source: Servicio Nacional de Meteorología e Hidrología de Bolivia
