= Tinguipaya Municipality =

- Municipality
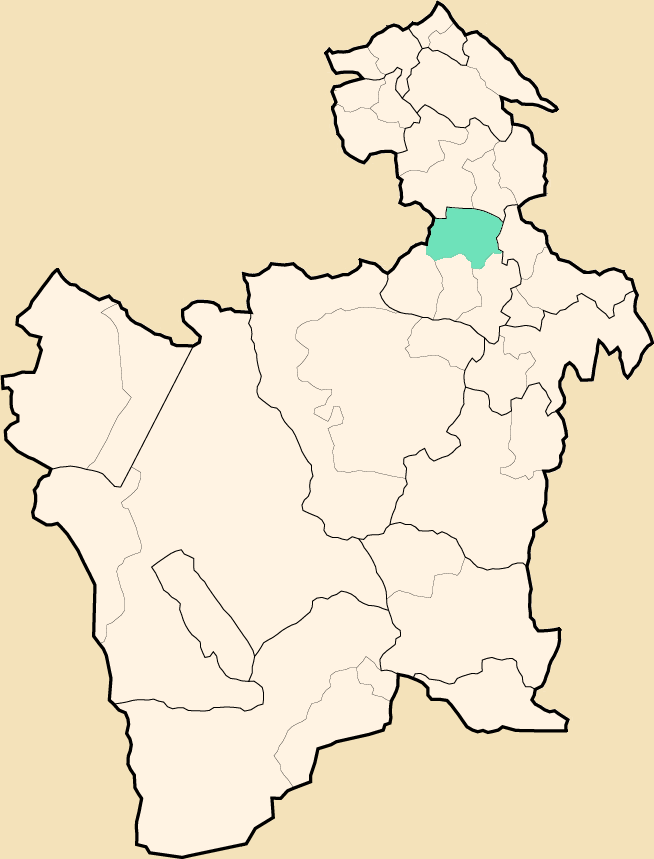
- Location within Potosí Department

- Location within Bolivia
- Coordinates: 19°23′S 66°0′W
- Country: Bolivia
- Department: Potosí Department
- Province: Tomás Frías Province
- Seat: Tinguipaya

Population (2001)
  - Total: 21,794
  - Ethnicities: Quechua
- Time zone: UTC-4 (BOT)

Tinguipaya Municipality is the first municipal section of the Tomás Frías Province in the Potosí Department in Bolivia. Its seat is Tinguipaya.

== Subdivision ==
The municipality consists of the following cantons:

- Anthura, created 9 November 1992
- Tinguipaya, created 29 December 1949

== Geography ==
The municipality is located in the interadean zone with heights between 3,100 m and 4,882 m Malmisa being the highest elevation. Some of the highest mountains of the municipality are listed below:

- Malmisa, 4,882 m
- Yana Qaqa, 4,858 m
- Wila Salla, 4,784 m
- Puka Qucha Punta, 4,756 m
- Yuraq Urqu, 4,742 m
- Jach'a Q'awa, 4,718 m
- Salla Punta, 4,640 m
- Wayna Potosí, 4,630 m
- Kuntur Nasa, 4,645 m
- Wayllita Punta, 4,626 m
- Wila Salla, 4,616 m
- Warmi Wañuna, 4,600 m
- Qiwiña Punta, 4,530 m
- Janq'u Janq'u, 4,500 m
- Kunturiri, 4,450 m
- Pä Qullu Punta, 4,400 m
- Q'illu Kancha, 4,350 m
- Kuntur Maña, 4,240 m
- Qura Waña, 4,180 m
- Sayasta, 4,170 m
- T'inki, 4,080 m
- Wankarani, 3,945 m

== The people ==
The people are predominantly indigenous citizens of Quechua descent.

Ethnic group	%
Quechua	94.7
Aymara	0.2
Guaraní, Chiquitos, Moxos	0.0
Not indigenous	5.1
Other indigenous groups	0.0

== See also ==
- Jatun Mayu
