= Wayra Wasi =

Mountain in Bolivia

- Location within Bolivia

Highest point
- Elevation: 4,416 m (14,488 ft)
- Coordinates: 19°23′33″S 65°38′45″W

Geography
- Location: Bolivia, Potosí Department
- Parent range: Andes

Wayra Wasi (Quechua wayra wind, wasi house, "wind house", Hispanicized spelling Huayra Huasi) is a 4,416-metre-high (14,488 ft) mountain in the Bolivian Andes. It is situated in the Potosí Department, Tomás Frías Province, Potosí Municipality. Wayra Wasi lies west of Jatun Q'asa and the Ch'aki Mayu (Quechua for "dry river", Chaqui Mayu). The river originates southeast of the mountain. It flows to the north.
