= Wila Salla (Oruro-Potosí) =

Mountain in Bolivia

- Location within Bolivia

Highest point
- Elevation: 4,616 m (15,144 ft)
- Coordinates: 19°07′12″S 66°06′12″W

Geography
- Location: Bolivia, Oruro Department, Potosí Department
- Parent range: Andes

Wila Salla (Aymara wila red, salla rocks, cliffs, "red rocks") is a 4,616-metre-high (15,144 ft) mountain in the Andes of Bolivia. It is located in the Oruro Department, Eduardo Abaroa Province, Challapata Municipality, and in the Potosí Department, Tomás Frías Province, Tinguipaya Municipality. It lies southeast of Kuntur Nasa.
