= Waylla Q'asa =

Mountain in Bolivia

- Location within Bolivia

Highest point
- Elevation: 4,568 m (14,987 ft)
- Coordinates: 19°30′32″S 65°58′28″W

Geography
- Location: Bolivia, Potosí Department
- Parent range: Andes

Waylla Q'asa (Quechua waylla meadow, q'asa mountain pass, "meadow pass", also spelled Huaylla Khasa) is a 4,568-metre-high (14,987 ft) mountain in the Bolivian Andes. It is located in the Potosí Department, Tomás Frías Province, Yocalla Municipality.
