= Potosí Municipality =

- Municipality
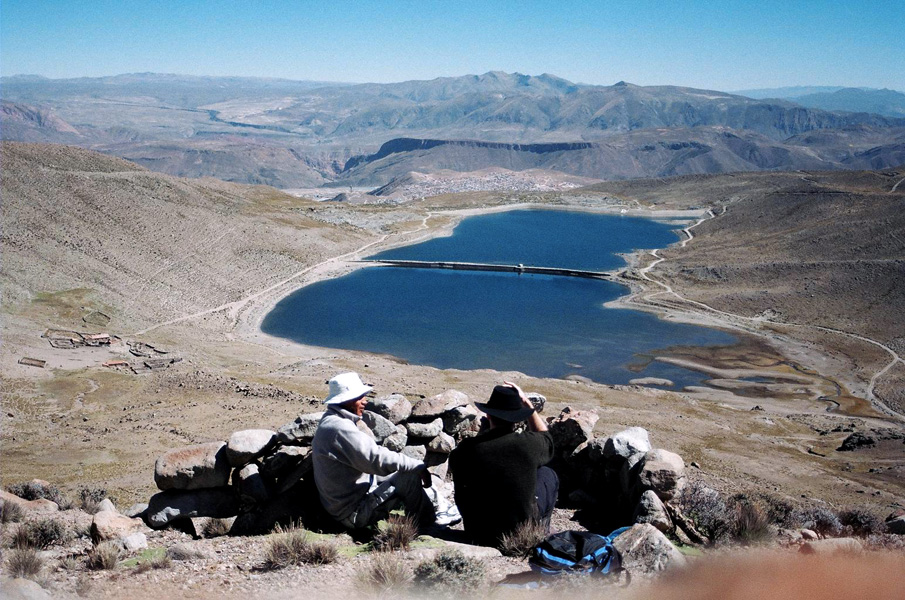
- Khari Khari Lakes, Potosí Municipality

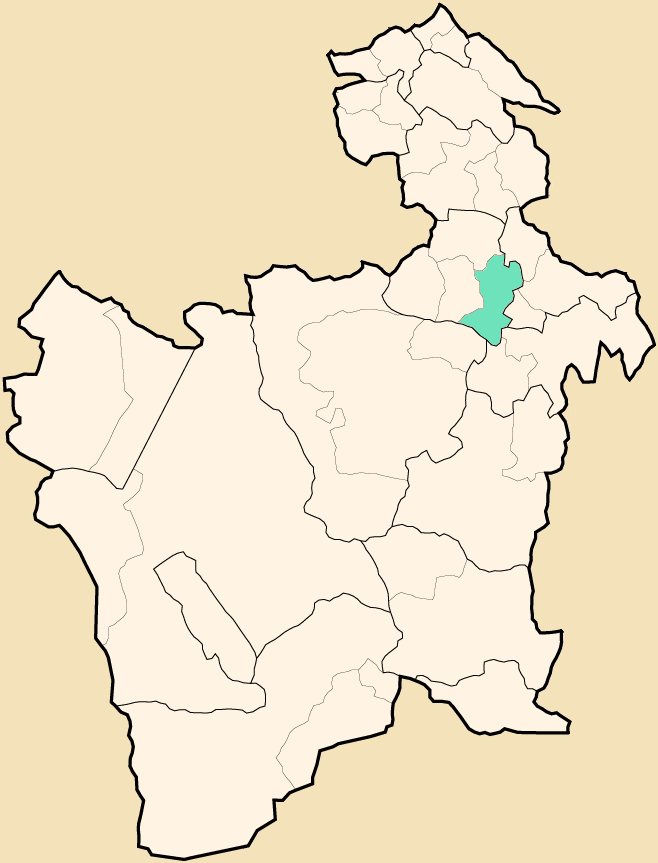
- Location within Potosí Department

- Location within Bolivia
- Coordinates: 19°35′S 65°43′W
- Country: Bolivia
- Department: Potosí Department
- Province: Tomás Frías Province
- Seat: Potosí

Area
  - Total: 460 sq mi (1,192 km^{2})

Population (2024 census)
  - Total: 218,336
  - Density: 474.4/sq mi (183.2/km^{2})
  - Ethnicities: Quechua
- Time zone: UTC-4 (BOT)

Potosí Municipality is the capital municipality of the Tomás Frías Province in the Potosí Department in Bolivia. Its seat is Potosí which is the capital of the department as well.

== Geography ==
The Potosí mountain range traverses the municipality. Some of the highest mountains of the municipality are listed below:

- Achakanani
- Anta Qullu
- Chawpi Urqu
- Jatun Ch'utu
- Jatun Q'asa
- Khari Khari
- Kuntur Qaqa
- Lik'ichiri
- Pari Urqu
- Pä Qullu
- P'ukru
- Qutaña Qullu
- Salla Punta
- Turini
- T'ula Punta
- T'ula Qullu
- Waylla Tira
- Wayra Wasi
- Wayra Wasi (Potosí-Yocalla)
- Yana Qaqa
- Yuraq Q'asa

== Subdivision ==
The municipality consists of the following cantons:

- Chulchucani
- Wari Wari
- Potosí
- Tarapaya

== Demographics ==
The people are predominantly indigenous citizens of Quechua descent.

Ethnic group	%
Quechua	68.1
Aymara	2.0
Guaraní, Chiquitos, Moxos	0.2
Not indigenous	29.5
Other indigenous groups	0.2

== See also ==
- Jayaq Mayu
- Khari Khari Lakes
- Tarapaya River
