= Waylla Qullu =

Mountain in Bolivia

- Location within Bolivia

Highest point
- Elevation: 3,740 m (12,270 ft)
- Coordinates: 19°25′55″S 65°49′16″W

Geography
- Location: Bolivia, Potosí Department
- Parent range: Andes

Waylla Qullu (Aymara waylla Stipa obtusa, a kind of feather grass, qullu mountain, "Stipa obtusa mountain", also spelled Huaylla Kkollu) is a mountain in the Bolivian Andes which reaches a height of approximately 3,740 m (12,270 ft). It is located in the Potosí Department, Tomás Frías Province, Yocalla Municipality.
