= Yana Qaqa (Potosí) =

Mountain in Bolivia

- Location within Bolivia

Highest point
- Elevation: 4,180 m (13,710 ft)
- Coordinates: 19°31′00″S 65°45′41″W

Geography
- Location: Bolivia, Potosí Department
- Parent range: Andes

Yana Qaqa (Quechua yana black, qaqa rock, "black rock", also spelled Yana Khakha) is a mountain in the Bolivian Andes which reaches a height of approximately 4,180 m (13,710 ft). It is located in the Potosí Department, Tomás Frías Province, Potosí Municipality, north of the city of Potosí.
