= Kuntur Qaqa (Bolivia) =

Mountain in Bolivia

- Location within Bolivia

Highest point
- Elevation: 4,006 m (13,143 ft)
- Coordinates: 19°20′39″S 65°42′03″W

Geography
- Location: Bolivia, Potosí Department
- Parent range: Andes

Kuntur Qaqa (Quechua kuntur condor, qaqa rock, "condor rock", also spelled Condor Khakha) is a 4,006-metre-high (13,143 ft) mountain in the Bolivian Andes. It is situated in the Potosí Department, Tomás Frías Province, in the north of the Potosí Municipality.
