= Jatun Mayu (Tomás Frías) =

- Etymology: Quechua

Location
- Country: Bolivia
- Region: Potosí Department
- Municipality: Tomás Frías Province

Jatun Mayu (Quechua hatun, jatun big, great, mayu river, "great river") which upstream is called Tinkipaya is a Bolivian river in the Potosí Department, Tomás Frías Province, Tinkipaya Municipality, Tinkipaya Canton, north of Potosí. It is a left tributary of the upper Pillku Mayu. The confluence is about 10 km south east of Tinkipaya.

== See also ==
- Tarapaya River
