= Chawpi Urqu (Yocalla) =

Mountain in Bolivia

- Location within Bolivia

Highest point
- Elevation: 4,440 m (14,570 ft)
- Coordinates: 19°31′17″S 65°52′52″W

Geography
- Location: Bolivia, Potosí Department
- Parent range: Andes

Chawpi Urqu (Quechua chawpi central, middle, urqu mountain, "central mountain", also spelled Chaupi Orkho) is a mountain in the Bolivian Andes which reaches a height of approximately 4,440 m (14,570 ft). It is located in the Potosí Department, Tomás Frías Province, Yocalla Municipality. It lies northeast of Wichhu Qullu.
