= Waylla Tira =

Mountain in Bolivia

- Location within Bolivia

Highest point
- Elevation: 4,324 m (14,186 ft)
- Coordinates: 19°19′16″S 65°37′10″W

Geography
- Location: Bolivia; Potosí Department, Tomás Frías Province
- Parent range: Andes

Waylla Tira (Aymara waylla Stipa obtusa, a kind of feather grass, tira cradle, "feather grass cradle", Hispanicized spelling Huayllatira) is a 4,324-metre-high (14,186 ft) mountain in the Andes of Bolivia. It is located in the Potosí Department, Tomás Frías Province, Potosí Municipality. Waylla Tira lies east of the Challwiri River, an affluent of the Pillku Mayu.
