= Kunturiri (Frías) =

Mountain in Bolivia

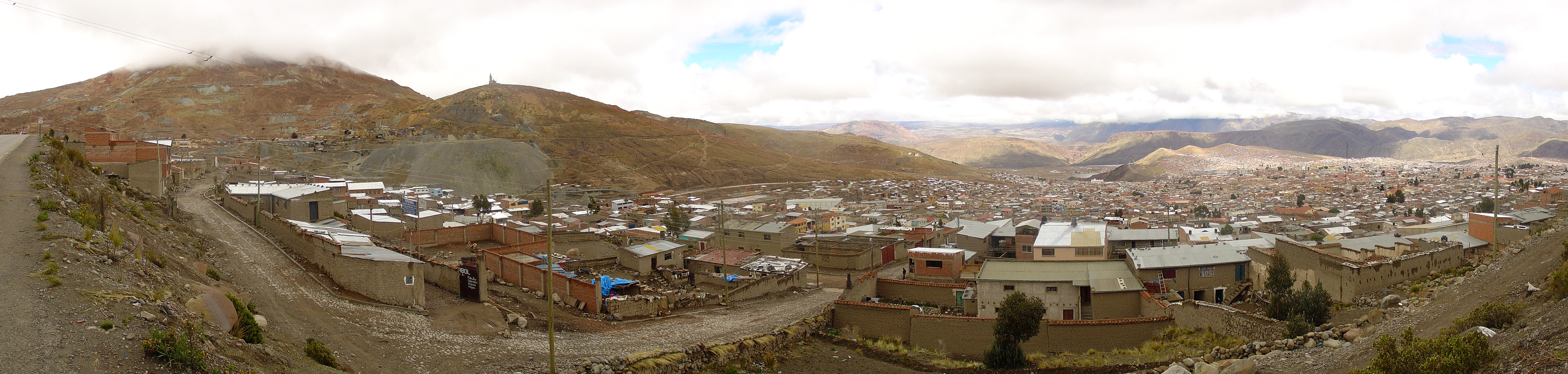
- Looking west from Potosí to Kunturiri (center, background)

Highest point
- Elevation: 4,526 m (14,849 ft)
- Coordinates: 19°36′03″S 65°52′13″W

Geography
- Location within Bolivia
- Location: Bolivia, Potosí Department, Tomás Frías Province
- Parent range: Andes

Kunturiri (Aymara kunturi condor, -(i)ri a suffix, Hispanicized spelling Condoriri) is a 4,526-metre-high (14,849 ft) mountain in the Bolivian Andes. It is situated west of Potosí in the Potosí Department, Tomás Frías Province, Yocalla Municipality. Kunturiri lies north-west of the lower mountain Inka Qhata (Aymara for "Inca knee pit", Quechua for "Inca slope", Inca Khata).
