= Jatun Q'asa (Umallani) =

Mountain in Bolivia

- Location within Bolivia

Highest point
- Elevation: 4,590 m (15,060 ft)
- Coordinates: 19°23′25″S 65°36′55″W

Geography
- Location: Bolivia, Potosí Department
- Parent range: Andes

Jatun Q'asa (Quechua jatun, hatun big, q'asa mountain pass, "big mountain pass", also spelled Jatun Khasa) is a 4,590-metre-high (15,059 ft) mountain in the Bolivian Andes. It is situated in the Potosí Department, Tomás Frías Province, Potosí Municipality. Some of the nearest settlements are Umallani and Salla K'uchu. Jatun Q'asa lies east Wayra Wasi, between the Ch'aki Mayu (Quechua for "dry river", Chaqui Mayu) in the west and the Challwiri River (Challviri) in the east. Both rivers flow to the north as right tributaries of the Pillku Mayu.
