= Jatun Q'asa (Yocalla) =

Mountain in Bolivia

- Location within Bolivia

Highest point
- Elevation: 4,398 m (14,429 ft)
- Coordinates: 19°28′37″S 65°51′46″W

Geography
- Location: Bolivia, Potosí Department
- Parent range: Andes

Jatun Q'asa (Quechua jatun, hatun big, q'asa mountain pass,"big mountain pass", also spelled Jatun Khasa) is a 4,398-metre-high (14,429 ft) mountain in the Bolivian Andes. It is located in the Potosí Department, Tomás Frías Province, Yocalla Municipality. It lies east of the village of Puka Wasi (Puca Huasi).
