= Wila Salla (Bolivia) =

Mountain in Bolivia

- Location within Bolivia

Highest point
- Elevation: 4,784 m (15,696 ft)
- Coordinates: 19°16′44″S 65°58′43″W

Geography
- Location: Bolivia, Potosí Department, Tomás Frías Province
- Parent range: Andes

Wila Salla (Aymara wila red, salla rocks, cliffs, "red rocks") is a 4,784-metre-high (15,696 ft) mountain in the Andes of Bolivia. It is located in the Potosí Department, Tomás Frías Province, on the border of the municipalities of Tinguipaya and Yocalla.
