= Wila Sirka (Potosí) =

Mountain in Bolivia

- Location within Bolivia

Highest point
- Elevation: 4,508 m (14,790 ft)
- Coordinates: 19°28′20″S 65°59′52″W

Geography
- Location: Bolivia, Potosí Department
- Parent range: Andes

Wila Sirka (Aymara wila blood, red, sirka vein of the body or a mine, "red vein", also spelled Wila Sirca) is a 4,508-metre-high (14,790 ft) mountain in the Bolivian Andes. It is located in the Potosí Department, Tomás Frías Province, Yocalla Municipality.
