= Lik'ichiri =

Mountain in Bolivia

- Location within Bolivia

Highest point
- Elevation: 4,086 m (13,406 ft)
- Coordinates: 19°28′50″S 65°43′30″W

Geography
- Location: Bolivia; Potosí Department, Tomás Frías Province
- Parent range: Andes

Lik'ichiri (Aymara lik'i fat, grease, fatness -chiri a suffix, "fat remover") is a mountain in the Andes of Bolivia in the Potosí Department, Tomás Frías Province, Potosí Municipality. It lies north of Potosí and the river Ch'aki Mayu and east of the village Tarapaya. Lik'ichiri is about 4,086 metres (13,406 ft) high. It is part of the Potosí mountain range.

It bears the name of a supernatural fat-sucking creature of Andean cultures, the Aymara-language equivalent to the Quechua term "pishtaco."
