= Wila Salla (Oruro) =

Mountain in Bolivia

- Location within Bolivia

Highest point
- Elevation: 4,652 m (15,262 ft)
- Coordinates: 19°06′05″S 66°15′27″W

Geography
- Location: Bolivia, Oruro Department
- Parent range: Andes

Wila Salla (Aymara wila red, salla rocks, cliffs, "red rocks") is a 4,652-metre-high (15,262 ft) mountain in the Andes of Bolivia. It is located in the Oruro Department, Eduardo Abaroa Province, Challapata Municipality. It lies southeast of Wila Qullu and Wila Quta.
