= Orcus (disambiguation) =

Orcus was a Roman god of the underworld.

Orcus may also refer to:

- Orcus (dwarf planet), a trans-Neptunian dwarf planet
- Orcus (beetle), a genus of beetles in the family Coccinellidae
- Orcus Patera, a large elongated depression the planet Mars
- Orcus (Dungeons & Dragons), a demon prince in the Dungeons & Dragons role-playing game
- Orcus, a major villain in the science fiction/fantasy Empire of the East series by Fred Saberhagen
- Orcus I, former designation of Dwarf planet Orcus' moon, Vanth
