= Yocalla Municipality =

- Municipality
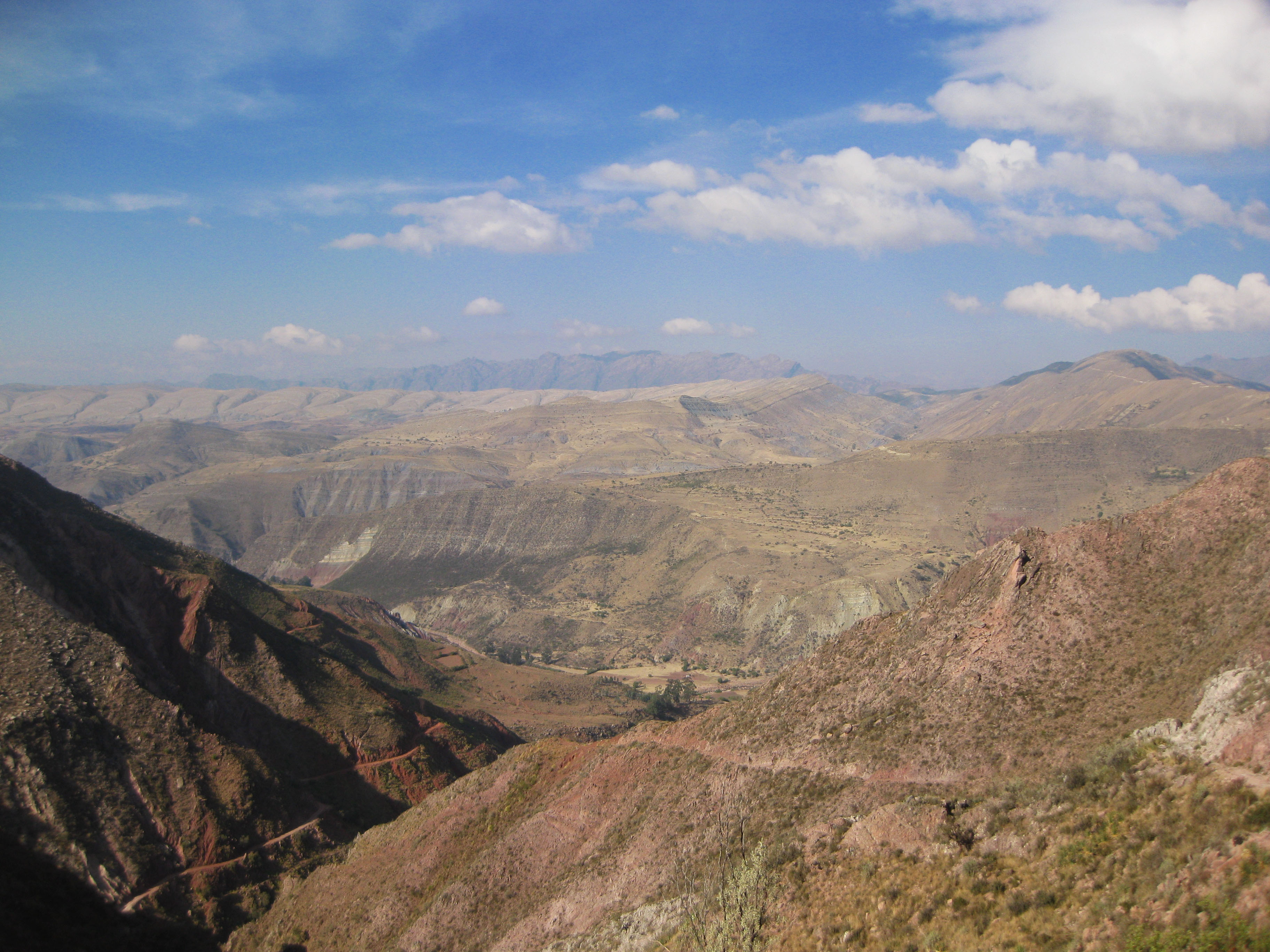
- Cordillera de los Frailes, looking west. Pari Chata (Yocalla Municipality) is on the right in the background, left of it is the Pillku Mayu valley.

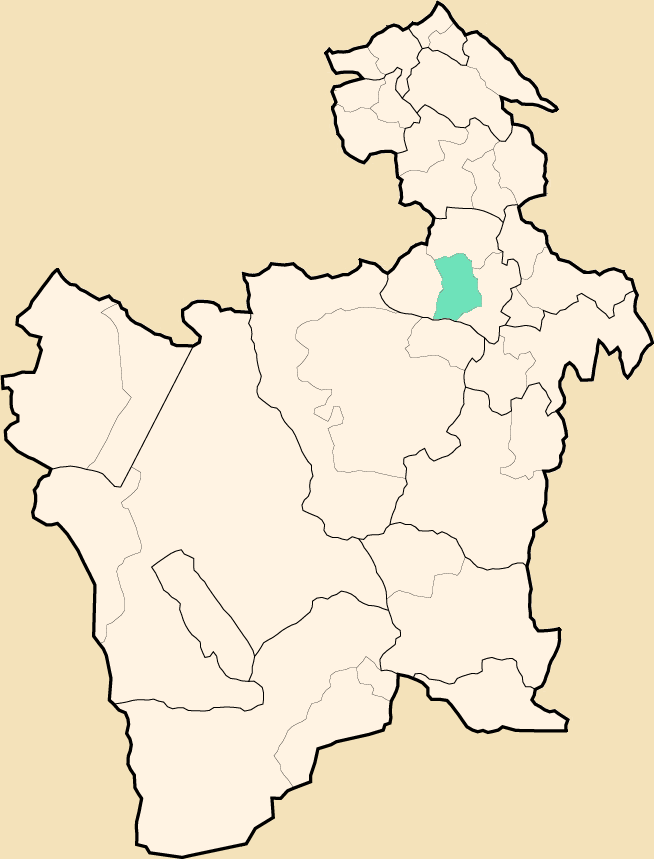
- Location within Potosí Department

- Location within Bolivia
- Coordinates: 19°23′S 65°55′W
- Country: Bolivia
- Department: Potosí Department
- Province: Tomás Frías Province
- Seat: Yocalla

Population (2001)
  - Total: 8,046
  - Ethnicities: Quechua
- Time zone: UTC-4 (BOT)

Yocalla Municipality is the second municipal section of the Tomás Frías Province in the Potosí Department in Bolivia. Its seat is Yocalla.

== Geography ==
Some of the highest mountains of the municipality are listed below:

- Achakana
- Chawpi Urqu
- Jalsuri
- Jatun Pampa
- Jatun Qaqa
- Jatun Q'asa
- Kuntur Nasa
- Kunturiri
- Pari Chata
- Puka Urqu
- T'ula P'ujru
- Waylla Qullu
- Waylla Q'asa
- Wichhu Qullu
- Wila Salla
- Wila Sirka

== Subdivision ==
The municipality consists of the following cantons:

- Salinas de Yocalla
- Santa Lucia
- Yocalla

== Government ==
The Mayor of Yocalla is Vladimir Zambrana Fernández, who was elected in the March 2026 elections.

Yocalla has a municipal council with 5 seats, as do all municipalities with populations up to 15,000.

Seat	Type	Name	Party / Political Organization
1	Member	Hilarión Ernesto Quispe Garabito	A.S.
1	Alternate	Nancy Condori Equise	A.S.
2	Member	Vilma Gómez Calla	CAOP
2	Alternate	Óscar Fernández Romano	CAOP
3	Member	María Colque Villca	PATRIA-UNIDOS
3	Alternate	TBD	PATRIA-UNIDOS
4	Member	Rosmery Olivia Quecaña Flores	A-UPP
4	Alternate	Eber Vargas Tórrez	A-UPP
5	Member	Lidia Martha Arando Condori	A.S.
5	Alternate	Héctor Julián Coro Arando	A.S.
Source: Supreme Electoral Tribunal.

== The people ==
The people are predominantly indigenous citizens of Quechua descent.

Ethnic group	%
Quechua	93.8
Aymara	0.4
Guaraní, Chiquitos, Moxos	0.1
Not indigenous	5.7
Other indigenous groups	0.1

== See also ==
- Pillku Mayu
