= Tarapaya River =

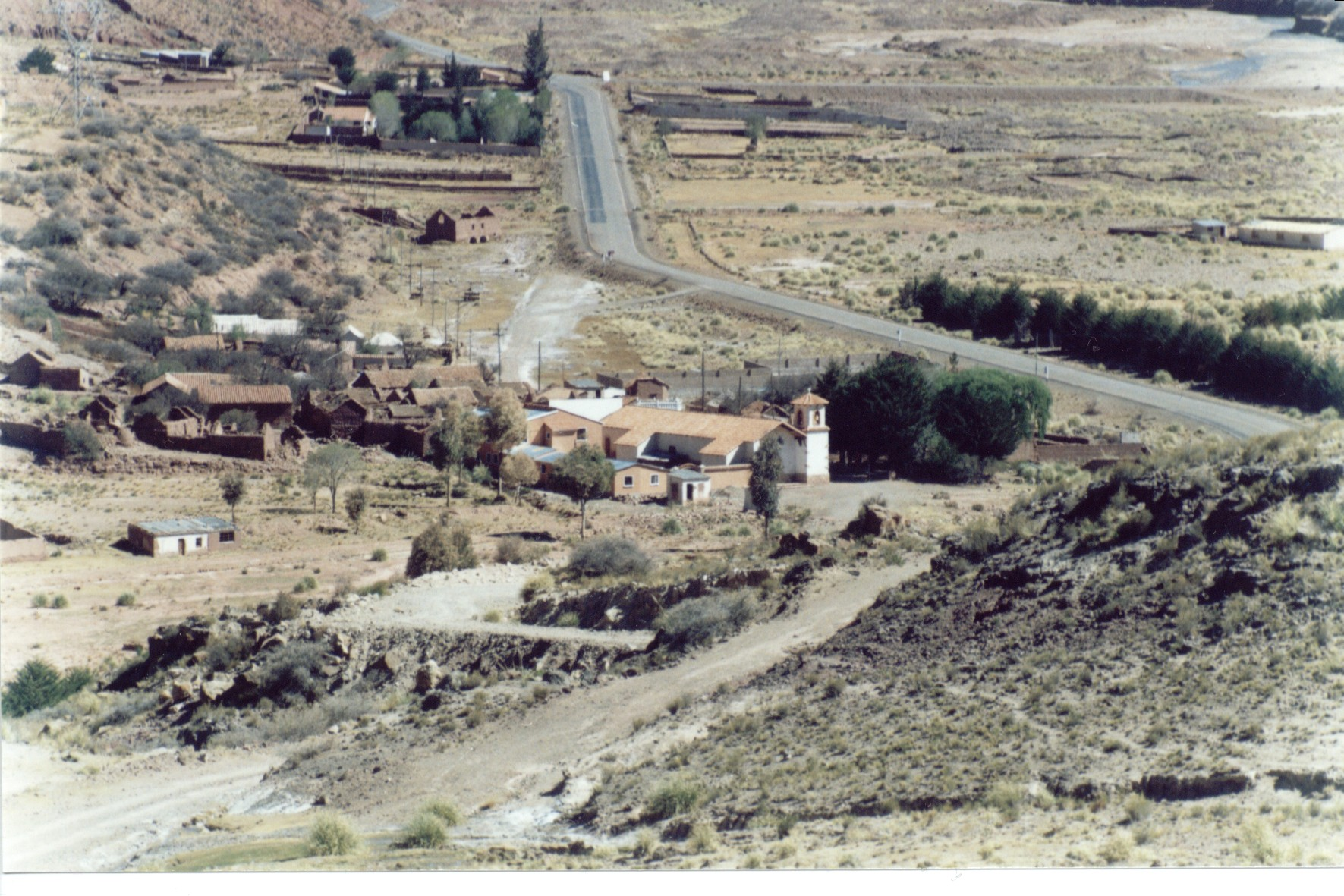
- The village Tarapaya as seen from the north with Tarapaya River west of it (upper right)

Location
- Country: Bolivia
- Region: Potosí Department

Physical characteristics
- Mouth: Pillku Mayu

Tarapaya River, originally also called Qayara, is a Bolivian river in the Potosí Department, Tomás Frías Province. Its direction is mainly north. Tarapaya is a right tributary of the upper Pillku Mayu.

== See also ==
- Jatun Mayu
- Jayaq Mayu
