= Kuntur Nasa (Oruro) =

Mountain in Oruro Department, Bolivia

- Location within Bolivia

Highest point
- Elevation: 4,645 m (15,240 ft)
- Coordinates: 19°05′04″S 66°06′22″W

Geography
- Location: Bolivia, Oruro Department, Challapata Province
- Parent range: Andes

Kuntur Nasa (Aymara kunturi condor, nasa nose, "condor nose", Hispanicized spellings Condor Nasa, Condor Naza, Condornasa) is a 4,645-metre-high (15,240 ft) mountain in the Andes in Bolivia. It is located in the Oruro Department, Challapata Province, in the east of the Challapata Municipality. Kuntur Nasa lies east of Cruce Culta and east of Nacional Route 1.

The river Millu Q'awa (Millokhaua) originates south-west of the mountain. It flows to the north-west.

== See also ==
- List of mountains in the Andes
