= Cordillera de los Frailes =

Mountainous region in the Bolivian Andes

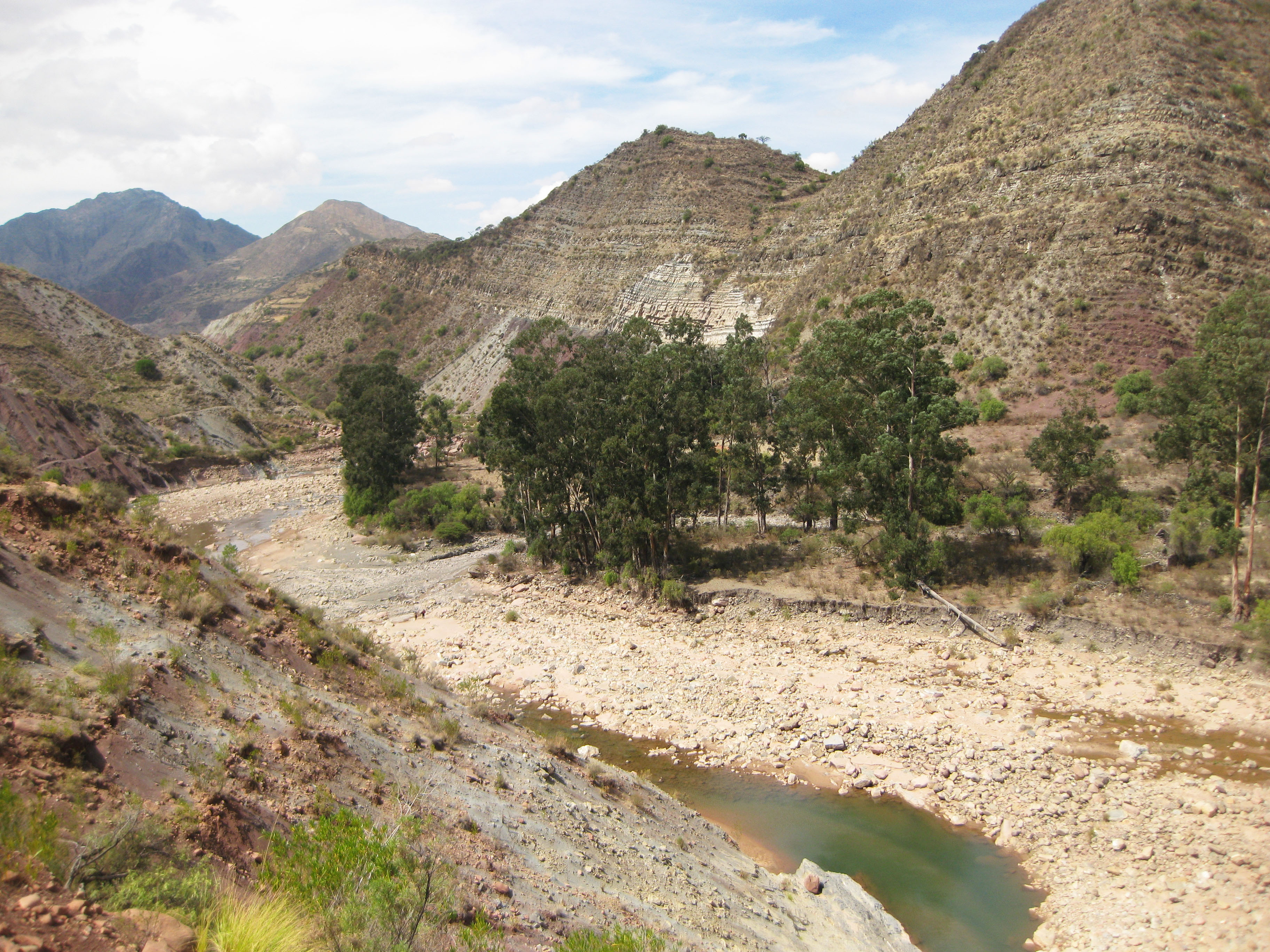
- River valley in the Cordillera de los Frailes

Highest point
- Peak: Nuevo Mundo
- Elevation: 5,438 m (17,841 ft)
- Coordinates: 19°35′S 66°25′W

Geography
- Country: Bolivia
- Parent range: Andes

The Cordillera de los Frailes is a mountainous region in the central parts of the Bolivian Andes.

== Geographical location ==
The Cordillera de los Frailes stretches along the north-eastern parts of Potosí Department bordering the north-western Chuquisaca Department. It consists of mainly two parts: the western region is a volcanic field of subhorizontal, undeformed ignimbrites dating back to upper Miocene, about 5 to 23 million years from today; the eastern part, the so-called Maragua Syncline which is much older, is a mountain range of sedimentary rock of Cretaceous-Paleocene origin in a north–south thrust.

The Cordillera de los Frailes borders Poopó Lake in the northwest and stretches between a line Challapata-Macha-Ravelo in the north and Río Mulato-Potosí-Betanzos in the south.

== Mountain peaks ==
The Cordillera de los Frailes contains fewer high elevations than the Cordillera de Lípez in the south or the Azanaques range in the north. The highest mountains in the area are the Jatun Mundo Quri Warani (Nuevo Mundo) (5,438 m) and Jatun Wila Qullu (5,214 m) in the southwestern parts of the region.

== Hydrology ==
Because of the landlocked location, the Cordillera de los Frailes gives rise to only a few rivers of supraregional importance. The main river of the region is the Pillkumayu which crosses the area from northwest to southeast.

== See also ==
- Los Frailes ignimbrite plateau
