= Tomás Frías Province =

Tomás Frías
- Province
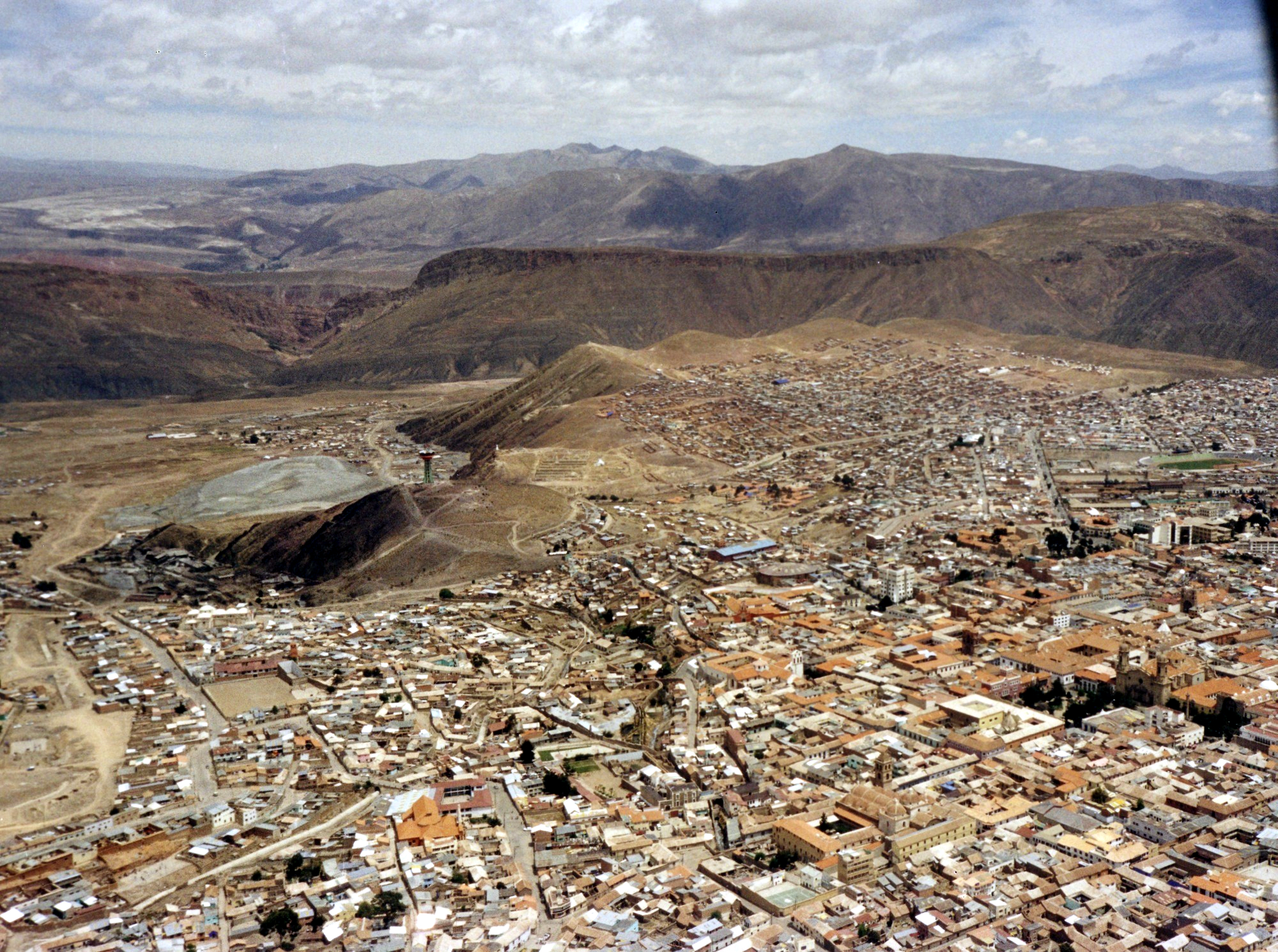
- Potosí, capital of the Tomás Frías Province and the Potosí Department

- Flag Seal

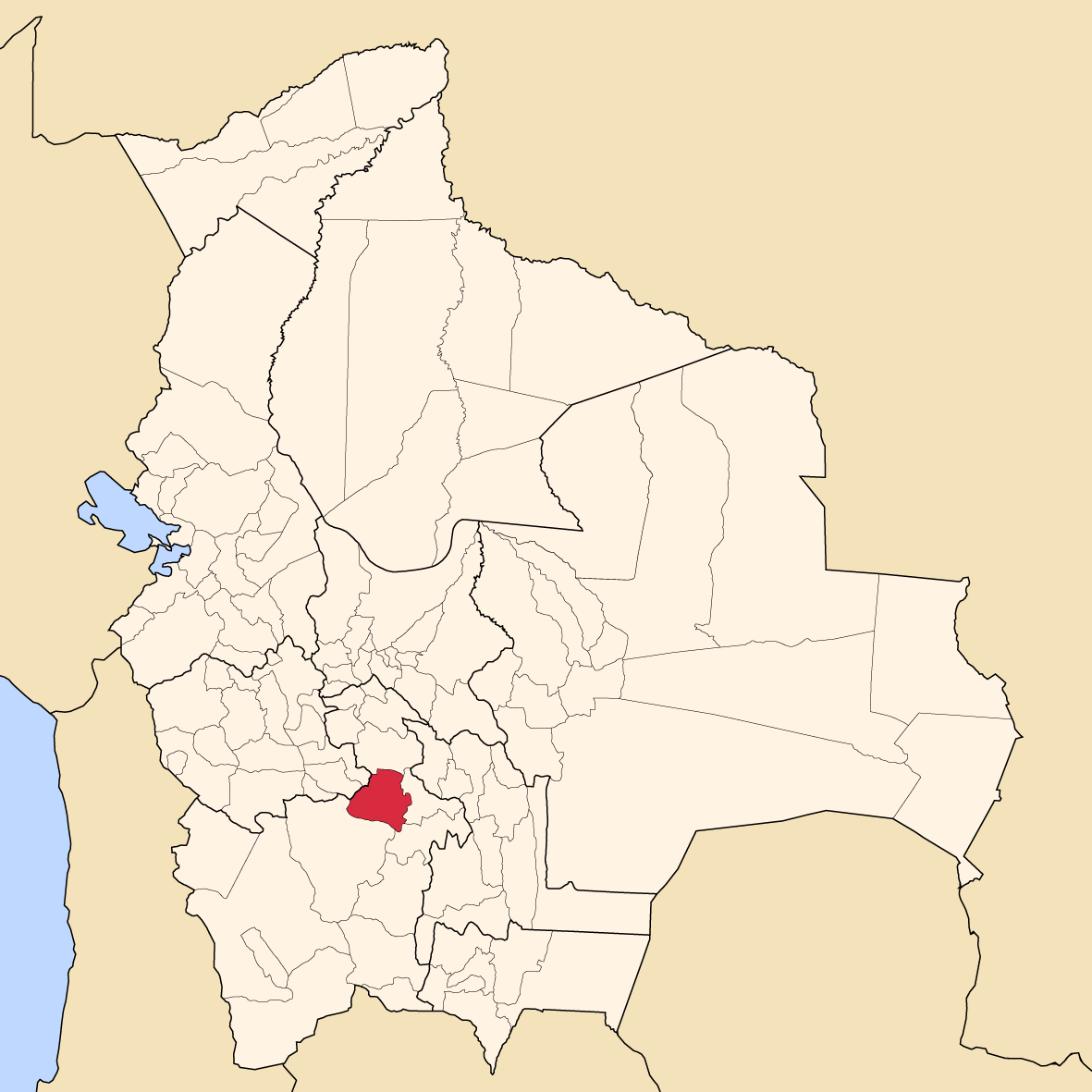
- Location of the Tomás Frías Province within Bolivia

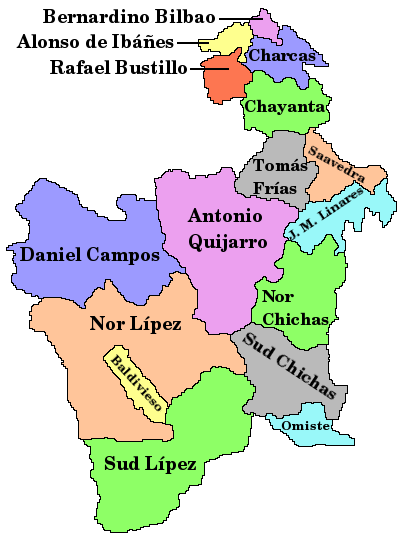
- Provinces of the Potosí Department
- Coordinates: 19°23′23″S 65°54′34″W
- Country: Bolivia
- Department: Potosí Department
- Capital: Potosí

Area
  - Total: 1,320 sq mi (3,420 km^{2})

Population (2024 census)
  - Total: 261,446
  - Density: 198/sq mi (76.4/km^{2})
  - Ethnicities: Quechua Aymara
- Time zone: UTC-4 (BOT)
- Area code: BO-P

Tomás Frías is a province in the northern parts of the Bolivian Potosí Department. Its capital is Potosí which is also the capital of the department. The province is named after the former president Tomás Frías Ametller.

== Location ==
Tomás Frías province is one of sixteen provinces in the Potosí Department. It is located between 19° 00' und 19° 50' South and between 65° 32' und 66° 24' West.

It borders Chayanta Province in the north, Oruro Department in the northwest, Antonio Quijarro Province in the southwest, José María Linares Province in the south, and Cornelio Saavedra Province in the east.

The province extends over 115 km from east to west and from north to south.

== Geography ==
The Potosí mountain range traverses the province. Some of the highest mountains of the province are listed below:

- Achakana
- Achakanani
- Chawpi Urqu (Potosí)
- Chawpi Urqu (Yocalla)
- Chuqi Kanlliyuq
- Jach'a Q'awa
- Jalsuri
- Janq'u Janq'u
- Jatun Ch'utu
- Jatun Pampa
- Jatun Qaqa
- Jatun Q'asa (Umallani)
- Jatun Q'asa (Yocalla)
- Kuntur Maña
- Kuntur Nasa (Tinguipaya)
- Kuntur Nasa (Yocalla)
- Kuntur Qaqa
- Kunturiri (Tinguipaya)
- Kunturiri (Yocalla)
- Lik'ichiri
- Malmisa
- Pari Chata
- Pä Qullu Punta
- Puka Qucha Punta
- Puka Urqu
- P'ukru
- Qiwiña Punta
- Qura Waña
- Q'illu Kancha
- Salla Punta
- Sayasta
- Turini
- T'inki
- T'ula P'ujru
- Wak'ani
- Wankarani
- Warmi Wañuna
- Waylla Tira
- Waylla Qullu
- Waylla Q'asa
- Waylla Unu
- Wayllita Punta
- Wayna Potosí
- Wayra Wasi
- Wayra Wasi (Potosí-Yocalla)
- Wichhu Qullu
- Wila Salla
- Wila Salla (Oruro-Potosí)
- Wila Sirka
- Yana Qaqa
- Yuraq Q'asa
- Yuraq Urqu

== Division ==
The province comprises four municipalities which are further subdivided into cantons.

Section	Municipality	Seat
Capital Municipality	Potosí Municipality	Potosí
1st	Tinguipaya Municipality	Tinguipaya
2nd	Yocalla Municipality	Yocalla
3rd	Urmiri Municipality	Urmiri

== Population ==
The main language of the province is Spanish, spoken by 84.5%, while 75.5% of the population speak Quechua. The population increased from 167,111 inhabitants (1992 census) to 176,922 (2001 census), an increase of 20%. Capital of the province is Potosí (132,966 inhabitants).

28% of the population have no access to electricity, 50.5% have no sanitary facilities.

21% of the population are employed in agriculture, 8% in mining, 10% in industry, 61% in general services. 92% of the population are Catholics, 5% Protestants.

The people are predominantly indigenous citizens of Quechua and Aymara descent.

Ethnic group	Potosí Municipality (%)	Tinguipaya Municipality (%)	Yocalla Municipality (%)	Urmiri Municipality (%)
Quechua	68,1	94,7	93,8	49,3
Aymara	2,0	0,2	0,4	46,6
Guaraní, Chiquitos, Moxos	0,2	0,0	0,1	0,0
Not indigenous	29,5	5,1	5,7	4,1
Other indigenous groups	0,2	0,0	0,1	0,1

== See also ==
- Ch'aki Mayu
- Jatun Mayu
- Tarapaya River
