= Ajomojo =

Mountain in Peru

- Location within Peru

Highest point
- Elevation: 5,000 m (16,000 ft)
- Coordinates: 13°58′10″S 71°08′38″W

Geography
- Location: Cuzco Department, Peru
- Parent range: Andes

Ajomojo (possibly from Quechua aqu sand, muqu, hill, "sand hill") is a mountain in the Andes of Peru, about 5,000 m (16,000 ft) high. It is located in the Cuzco Department, Canchis Province, Pitumarca District. Ajomojo lies northwest of Intijahuana and east of Huampuni. It is situated at the bank of the Yanamayu, a left tributary of the Chillcamayu whose waters flow to the Vilcanota River.
