= Yana Orjo (Canchis) =

Mountain in Peru

- Location within Peru

Highest point
- Elevation: 5,100 m (16,700 ft)
- Coordinates: 13°53′49″S 71°07′50″W

Geography
- Location: Peru, Cusco Region
- Parent range: Andes, Vilcanota mountain range

Yana Orjo (possibly from Quechua yana black, urqu mountain, "black mountain") is a mountain in the Vilcanota mountain range in the Andes of Peru, about 5,100 metres (16,732 ft) high. It is located in the Cusco Region, Canchis Province, Pitumarca District. Yana Orjo lies west of the lake Sibinacocha. It is situated south of the mountains Cóndor Tuco and Chuallani, northeast of Orco Puñuna and east of Othaña.
