= Chaupimaquito =

Mountain in Peru

- Location within Peru

Highest point
- Elevation: 5,300 m (17,400 ft)
- Coordinates: 13°50′00″S 70°56′23″W

Geography
- Location: Peru, Cusco Region
- Parent range: Andes, Vilcanota

Chaupimaquito (possibly from Quechua chawpi central, middle, makitu an additional sleeve which Andean women and men put on in some cold regions, "central makitu") is a mountain in the Vilcanota mountain range in the Andes of Peru, about 5,300 metres (17,388 ft) high. It is located in the Cusco Region, Canchis Province, Pitumarca District, east of Sibinacocha. It lies southeast of Condoriquiña and west of Pucasalla.
