= Anta (Canchis) =

Mountain in Peru

- Location within Peru

Highest point
- Elevation: 4,915 m (16,125 ft)
- Coordinates: 14°06′35″S 71°01′09″W

Geography
- Location: Peru, Cusco Region
- Parent range: Andes

Anta (Quechua for copper, also spelled Anda) is a 4,915-metre-high (16,125 ft) mountain in the Andes of Peru. It is located in the Cusco Region, Canchis Province, on the border of the districts of Checacupe and San Pablo. Anta lies near the Chhuyumayu valley, southeast of Jach'a Sirk'i and Wari Sallani.
