= Machu Pitumarka =

Archaeological site in Peru

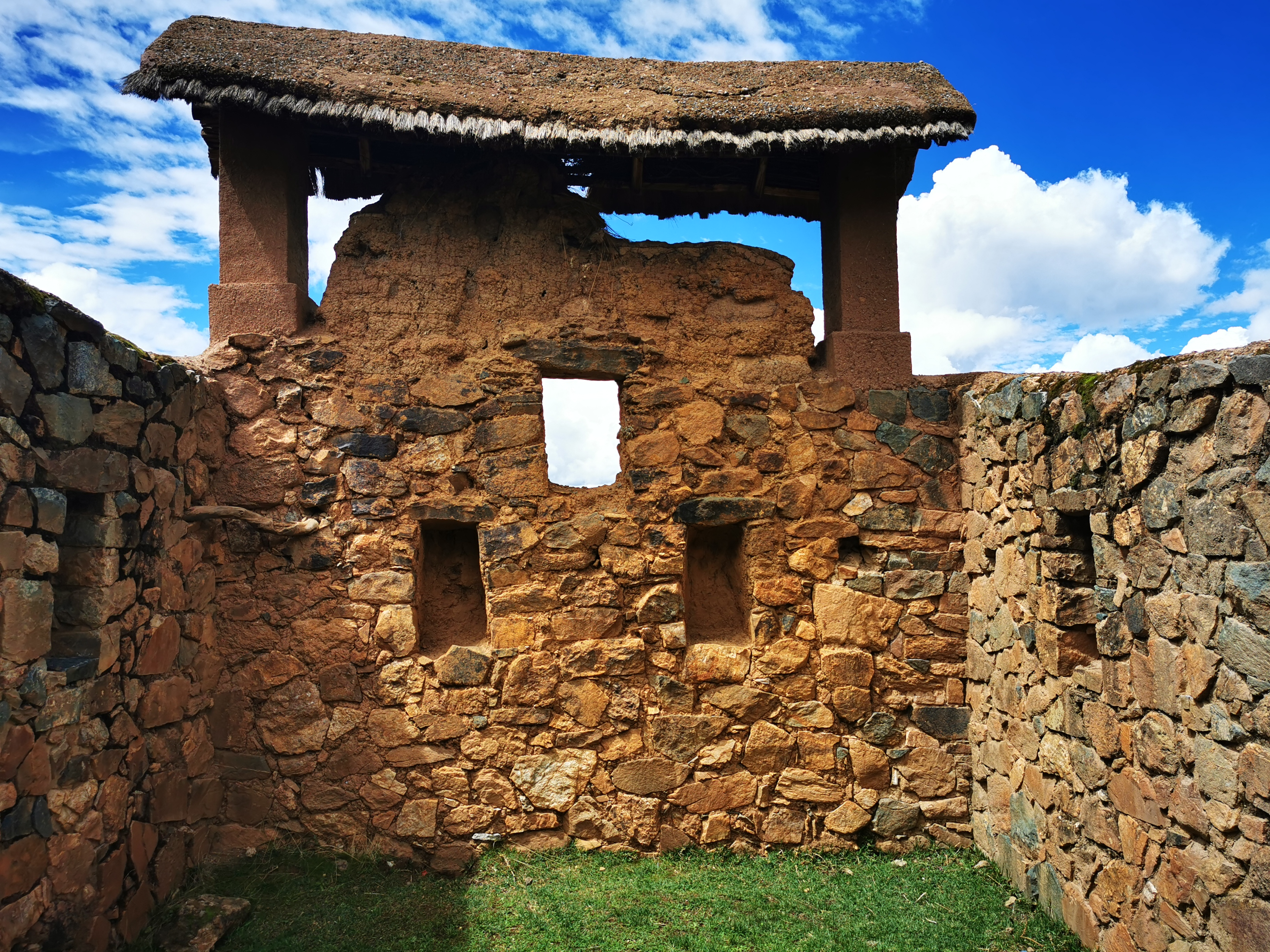
- Interactive map of Machu Pitumarka
- 13°58′03.79″S 71°23′56.82″W
- Location: Peru
- Region: Cusco Region, Canchis Province

Site notes
- Height: 3,465 metres (11,368 ft)

Machu Pitumarka (hispanicized spelling Machu Pitumarca, Machupitumarca) is an archaeological site with ruins of walls in Peru. It is situated in the Cusco Region, Canchis Province, Pitumarca District. Machu Pitumarka lies on a hill northeast of Pitumarka (Pitumarca) at the southern shore of the river Ch'illkamayu.

== See also ==
- Ayamach'ay
- Llamachayuq Qaqa
