= Osjollo Anante =

Mountain in Peru

- Location within Peru

Highest point
- Elevation: 5,500 m (18,000 ft)
- Coordinates: 13°45′13″S 71°06′00″W

Naming
- English translation: the one with a big needle
- Language of name: Aymara

Geography
- Location: Peru
- Parent range: Andes, Vilcanota

Osjollo Anante (possibly from Quechua usqullu Andean mountain cat,) is a mountain in the Vilcanota mountain range in the Andes of Peru near a lake of the same name. The mountain is about 5,500 metres (18,045 ft) high. It is located in the Cusco Region, Canchis Province, Pitumarca District, and in the Quispicanchi Province, Ocongate District. Osjollo Anante lies southwest of the mountains Jatunñaño Punta and Chumpe, west of Uriyuq, northwest of Cuncapata and northwest of the lake Sibinacocha and northeast of Japu Japu.

The lake named Osjollo Ananta lies southwest of the mountain in the Pitumarca District at 13°46′32″S 71°07′06″W.
