= Sacsa Ananta =

Mountain in Peru

- Location within Peru

Highest point
- Elevation: 5,400 m (17,700 ft)
- Coordinates: 13°48′19″S 70°55′34″W

Naming
- Language of name: Aymara

Geography
- Location: Peru
- Parent range: Andes, Vilcanota

Sacsa Ananta (possibly from Quechua saqsa multi-colored) is a mountain in the Andes of Peru, about 5,400 metres (17,717 ft) high, situated in the Vilcanota mountain range south east of Cusco. It is located in the Cusco Region, Canchis Province, Pitumarca District, and in the Quispicanchi Province, Marcapata District. Sacsa Ananta lies west of Istalla, northwest of Condoriquiña and southeast of Pajo.
