= Anti Pukara =

Mountain in Peru

- Location within Peru

Highest point
- Elevation: 5,000 m (16,000 ft)
- Coordinates: 13°55′56″S 71°08′16″W

Geography
- Location: Peru, Cusco Region
- Parent range: Andes

Anti Pukara (Quechua anti east, pukara fortress, hispanicized spelling Antipucara) is a mountain in the Andes of Peru, about 5,000 m (16,000 ft) high. It is located in the Cusco Region, Canchis Province, Pitumarca District. Anti Pukara lies southeast of Urqu Puñuna. It is situated near the Yanamayu, a left tributary of the Ch'illkamayu whose waters flow to the Willkanuta River.
