= Japu Punta =

Mountain in Peru

- Huichcana
- Location within Peru

Highest point
- Elevation: 5,845 m (19,177 ft)
- Coordinates: 13°45′21″S 71°00′17″W

Geography
- Location: Cusco Region
- Parent range: Andes, Vilcanota

Climbing
- First ascent: 1-1974 via W. ridge

Japu Punta (possibly from Quechua hapu oven made in the field of clods of earth with dry roots which are burnt to heat potatoes in them to prepare wathiya, a traditional dish, punta peak; ridge; first, before, in front of,) or Huichcana (possibly from Quechua for a bar across a door or window, bolt, lock, blockade,) is a mountain in the Vilcanota mountain range in the Andes of Peru, about 5,845 metres (19,177 ft) high. It is situated in the Cusco Region, Canchis Province, Pitumarca District and in the Quispicanchi Province, Marcapata District. Japu Punta lies north of the lake Sibinacocha and northwest of Condoriquiña, Huila Aje and Yayamari.
