= Puman Tira =

Mountain in Peru

- Location within Peru

Highest point
- Elevation: 5,100 m (16,700 ft)
- Coordinates: 13°59′31″S 71°10′12″W

Geography
- Location: Peru, Cusco Region
- Parent range: Andes

Puman Tira (Aymara puma cougar, tira cradle, -n(i) a suffix, "the cradle with (or of) a puma", also spelled Pumantira) is a mountain in the Andes of Peru, about 5,100 m (16,700 ft) high . It is located in the Cusco Region, Canchis Province, on the border of the districts of Checacupe and Pitumarca. Puman Tira lies between Phatanka in the southeast and Wampuni in the northwest.
