= Pitumarca District =

Coordinates: 13.9777°S 71.4158°W

Pitumarca Pitumarka
- District
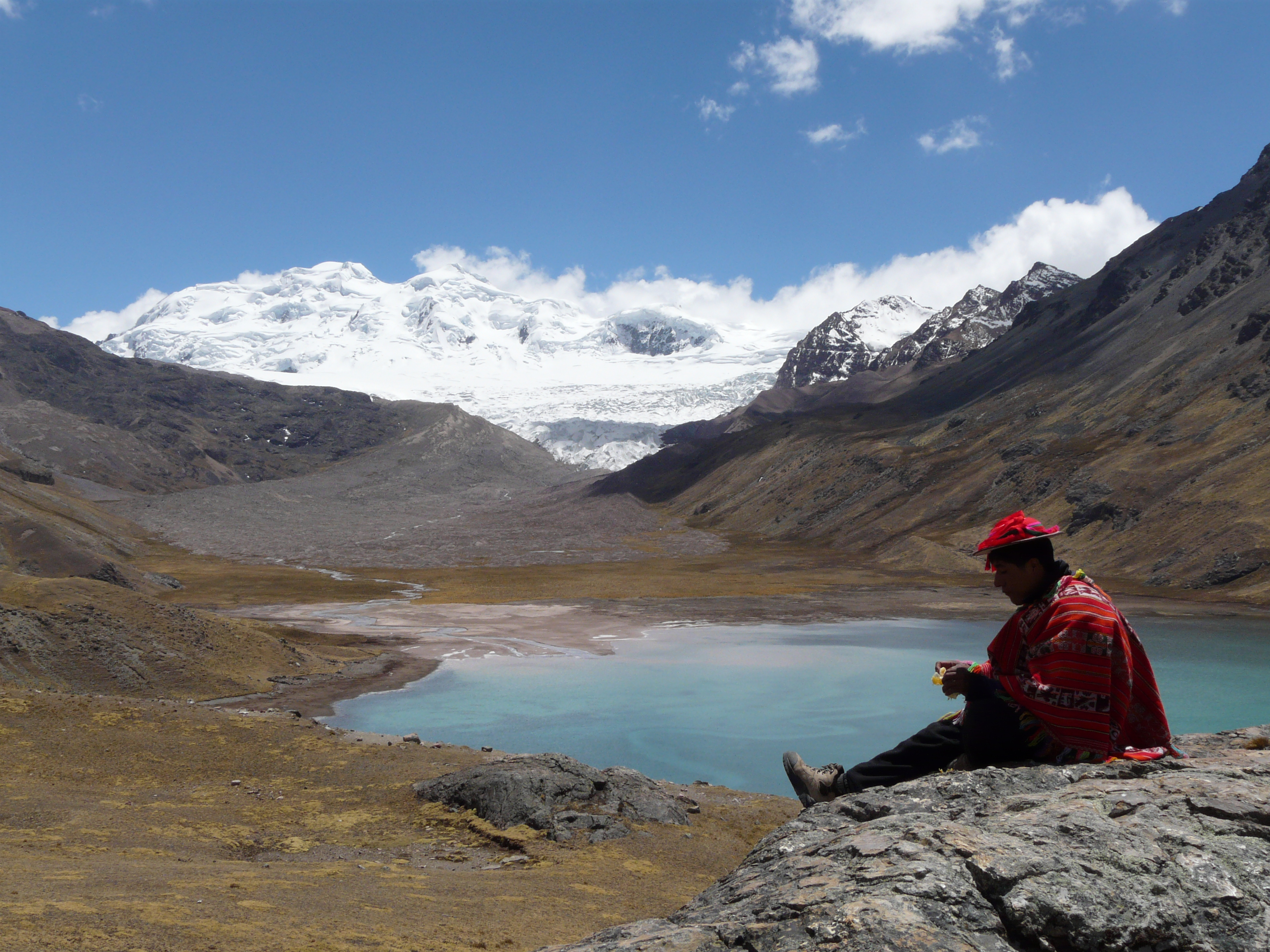
- The lake Siwinaqucha with the mountain Chumpi in the background
- Interactive map of Pitumarca
- Country: Peru
- Region: Cusco
- Province: Canchis
- Founded: November 11, 1907
- Capital: Pitumarca

Government
  - Mayor: Manuel Jesús Zvietcovich Alvarez

Area
  - Total: 1,117.54 km^{2} (431.48 sq mi)
- Elevation: 3,570 m (11,710 ft)

Population (2005 census)
  - Total: 8,000
  - Density: 7.2/km^{2} (19/sq mi)
- Time zone: UTC-5 (PET)
- UBIGEO: 080605

Pitumarca District is one of eight districts of the province Canchis in Peru. In recent years, the district has become an emerging destination for high-altitude rock climbing, with granite formations in the Pitumarca Valley attracting both Peruvian and international climbers.

== Geography ==
The Willkanuta mountain range lies in the district. Some of the highest mountains of the district are Chumpi, Chupika, Hatun Uma, Hatun Ñañu Punta, Kuntur Ikiña, Wayruru Punku, Wila Jaqhi, Yana Qaqa and Yayamari. Other mountains are listed below:

- Allqamarina
- Anti Pukara
- Aqu Muqu
- Chachakumayuq
- Chawpi Makitu
- Chilinita
- Chullumpina
- Chuwallani
- Hapu Punta
- Hatun Ch'aqu
- Hatun Phuyuni
- Hatun Rit'iyuq
- Hatun Salla
- Huch'uy Milla
- Inka Qucha
- Istalla
- Inti Qhawana
- Japu Japu
- K'illi
- K'illi Punta
- Kunkapata
- Kuntur Ikiña
- Kuntur Sayana
- Kuntur T'uqu
- Ñawña
- Pichaqani
- Puka Kunka
- Puka Punta
- Puka Qaqa
- Puka Q'asa
- Puka Salla
- Puma Qaqa
- Puman Tira
- Pupusayuq Kunka
- Phaq'u
- P'allqa Pata
- Qillita
- Qiwlla Qucha
- Quri Suyu
- Q'illu Kunka
- Q'uli Pata
- Q'umirqucha
- Sallapata
- Saqsa Ananta
- Suyu Parina
- Taruka Sayana
- Tiklla Q'asa
- Tuqtu
- Uqi Punta
- Uqi Q'asa
- Uqi Unu
- Uriyuq
- Urqu Puñuna
- Usqullu Ananta
- Utt'aña
- Wajchani
- Waman Wachana
- Wamanripayuq
- Wampuni
- Wasaqucha
- Wayllani
- Wayna K'illi
- Wayra Qaqa
- Wiluyu
- Yana Chukchu
- Yana K'uchu
- Yana Qaqa
- Yana Urqu
- Yaritani
- Yuraq Q'asa
- Yuraq Salla

The most important rivers are the Ch'illka Mayu and the Yana Mayu, one of its left tributaries, as well as the Chuwa Mayu (Chuamayu). All of them are tributaries of the Willkanuta River.

Siwinaqucha is the largest lake of the district and also one of the largest lakes of Peru.

== Ethnic groups ==
The people in the district are mainly indigenous citizens of Quechua descent. Quechua is the language which the majority of the population (95.17%) learnt to speak in childhood, 4.77% of the residents started speaking using the Spanish language (2007 Peru Census).

== See also ==
- Machu Pitumarka
