= Viluyo (Pitumarca) =

Mountain in Peru

- Location within Peru

Highest point
- Elevation: 5,200 m (17,100 ft)
- Coordinates: 13°51′05″S 70°55′34″W

Geography
- Location: Peru, Cusco Region
- Parent range: Andes, Vilcanota

Viluyo (possibly from Aymara wila blood, blood-red, uyu corral, "red corral") is a mountain in the Vilcanota mountain range in the Andes of Peru, about 5,200 metres (17,060 ft) high. It is located in the Cusco Region, Canchis Province, Pitumarca District, east of Sibinacocha. It lies south and southwest of Condoriquiña.
