= Cuncapata =

Mountain in Peru

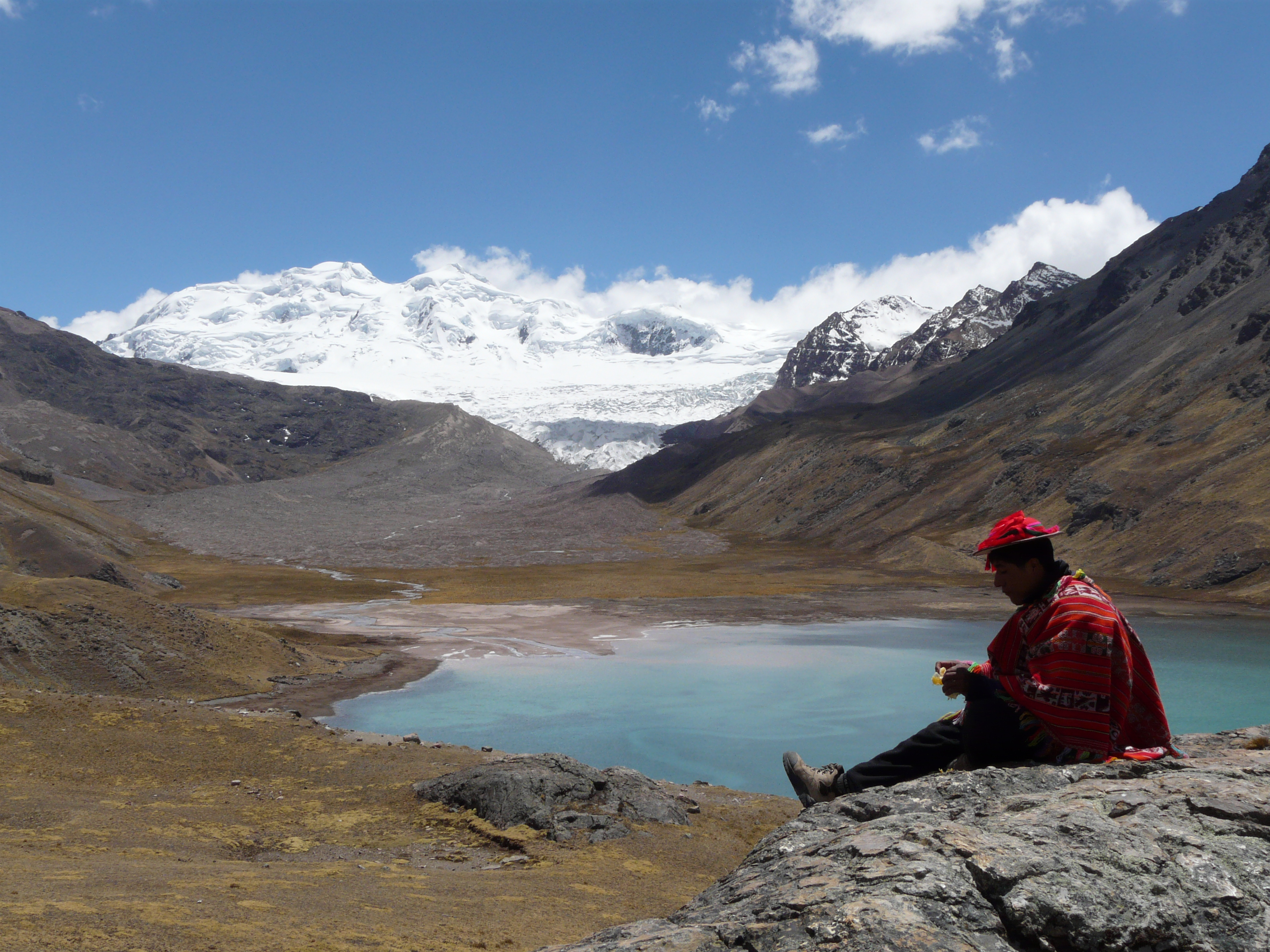
- Chumpi (on the left) and Cuncapata (on the right) behind the lake Sibinacocha

Highest point
- Elevation: 5,400 m (17,700 ft)
- Coordinates: 13°45′45″S 71°03′37″W

Naming
- Language of name: Aymara

Geography
- Location within Peru
- Location: Peru
- Parent range: Andes, Vilcanota

Cuncapata (possibly from Aymara kunka throat, pata step, Quechua kunka throat, pata elevated place / above, at the top / edge, bank (of a river), shore,) is a mountain in the Vilcanota mountain range in the Andes of Peru, about 5,400 metres (17,717 ft) high. It is located in the Cusco Region, Canchis Province, Pitumarca District. Cuncapata lies southwest of the mountain Jatunñaño Punta, north of the lake Sibinacocha and southeast of Chumpe.
