= Sanimayo =

Mountain in Peru

- Location within Peru

Highest point
- Elevation: 5,300 m (17,400 ft)
- Coordinates: 13°47′16″S 70°56′00″W

Geography
- Location: Peru, Cusco Region
- Parent range: Andes, Vilcanota

Sanimayo (possibly from Quechua sani purple, violet, mayu river "purple (or violet) river") is a mountain in the Vilcanota mountain range in the Andes of Peru, about 5,300 metres (17,388 ft) high. It is situated in the Cusco Region, Quispicanchi Province, Marcapata District. Sanimayo lies northwest of the peaks of Condoriquiña and Sacsa Ananta and east of Huila Aje.
