= Puka Urqu (Canchis) =

Mountain in Peru

- Location within Peru

Highest point
- Elevation: 4,800 m (15,700 ft)
- Coordinates: 14°06′29″S 71°16′20″W

Geography
- Location: Peru, Cusco Region, Canchis Province
- Parent range: Andes

Puka Urqu (Quechua puka red, urqu mountain, "red mountain", Hispanicized spelling Pucaorcco) is a mountain in the Andes of Peru, about 4,800 m (15,700 ft) high . It is situated in the Cusco Region, Canchis Province, Combapata District. Puka Urqu lies northwest of Inka Pirqa. The Llanqha Mayu (or Sallqa Mayu) flows along its slopes. It is a right affluent of the Willkanuta River.
