= Sayrecucho =

Mountain in Peru near Cusco

- Location within Peru

Highest point
- Elevation: 5,200 m (17,100 ft)
- Coordinates: 14°01′42″S 70°51′37″W

Geography
- Location: Peru
- Parent range: Andes, Vilcanota

Sayrecucho (possibly from Aymara and Quechua sayri tobacco, k'uchu corner, "tobacco corner") is a mountain in the Vilcanota mountain range in the Andes of Peru, about 5,200 metres (17,060 ft) high. It is situated in the Cusco Region, Canchis Province, Checacupe District, and in the Puno Region, Carabaya Province, Corani District. Sayrecucho lies southeast of the mountains Otoroncane and Huancane Apacheta, northwest of Culi and north of Tutallipina. The river Huancane originates north of Sayrecucho. Its waters flow to the Vilcanota River.
