= Yanacucho =

Mountain in Peru

- Location within Peru

Highest point
- Elevation: 5,000 m (16,000 ft)
- Coordinates: 13°49′40″S 71°09′15″W

Geography
- Location: Peru, Cusco Region
- Parent range: Andes, Vilcanota

Yanacucho (Quechua yana black, k'uchu corner, "black corner") is a mountain in the Vilcanota mountain range in the Andes of Peru, about 5,000 m (16,000 ft) high. It is situated in the Cusco Region, Canchis Province, Pitumarca District. Yanacucho lies southwest of the mountain named Comercocha and northwest of Cóndor Tuco.
