= Pajo (mountain) =

Mountain in Peru

- Location within Peru

Highest point
- Elevation: 5,400 m (17,700 ft)
- Coordinates: 13°46′53″S 71°05′35″W

Geography
- Location: Peru, Cusco Region
- Parent range: Andes, Vilcanota

Pajo (possibly from Aymara for light brown, reddish, or '(Quechua for alpaca) is a mountain in the Vilcanota mountain range in the Andes of Peru, about 5,400 metres (17,717 ft) high. It is located in the Cusco Region, Canchis Province, Pitumarca District, northwest of Sibinacocha. It lies north of the peak of Uchuy Milla, northeast of Huayruro Punco and southeast of Osjollo Anante and Japu Japu. East of Pajo there is a valley with an intermittent stream named Puca orco (Quechua for "red mountain"). Its waters flow to Sibinacocha.

== See also ==
- Sibagat
- Agusan del Sur
