= Alcamarina =

Mountain in Peru

- Location within Peru

Highest point
- Elevation: 5,085 m (16,683 ft)
- Coordinates: 13°53′59″S 71°09′11″W

Geography
- Location: Cusco Region, Peru
- Parent range: Cordillera Vilcanota (Andes)

Alcamarina (possibly from Aymara and Quechua allqamari mountain caracara, -na a Quechua suffix, may be "the place of the mountain caracara") is a 5,085-metre-high (16,683 ft) mountain in the Vilcanota mountain range in the Andes of Peru. It is situated in the Cusco Region, Canchis Province, Pitumarca District. Alcamarina lies northwest of Orco Puñuna and west of Othaña.
