= Huanacune (Cusco) =

Mountain in Peru

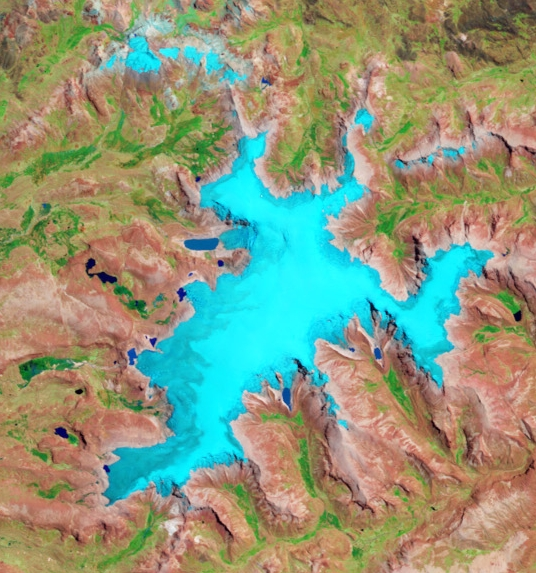
- The glaciated Quelccaya area (center) and Huanacune shown in the upper left part of this image (NASA, 2010)

Highest point
- Elevation: 5,200 m (17,100 ft)
- Coordinates: 13°52′31″S 70°53′24″W

Geography
- Location within Peru
- Location: Peru, Cusco Region
- Parent range: Andes, Vilcanota

Huanacune (possibly from Aymara wanaku, wanaqu guanaco, -ni Aymara suffix to indicate ownership, "the one with the guanaco") is a mountain in the Vilcanota mountain range in the Andes of Peru, about 5,200 metres (17,060 ft) high. It is situated in the Cusco Region, Canchis Province, Checacupe District. Huanacune lies northwest of the glaciated area of Quelccaya (Quechua for "snow plain"), southwest of Unollocsina and Millo. Tallacunca is to the southwest.
