= Suyuparina =

Mountain in Peru near Cusco

- Location within Peru

Highest point
- Elevation: 5,400 m (17,700 ft)
- Coordinates: 13°46′43″S 70°53′28″W

Naming
- Language of name: Aymara

Geography
- Location: Peru
- Parent range: Andes, Vilcanota

Suyuparina (possibly from Aymara suyu land lot, district, region, parina flamingo) is a mountain in the Vilcanota mountain range in the Andes of Peru, about 5,400 metres (17,717 ft) high. It is located in the Cusco Region, Canchis Province, Pitumarca District, and in the Quispicanchi Province, Marcapata District. Suyuparina lies south of the peak of Yanajasa and northeast of Sacsa Ananta, Condoriquiña and Istalla. The mountain is situated east of the Parina valley. Its intermittent stream flows to Arasa River (Araza) in the north.

== See also ==
- List of mountains in Peru
- List of mountains in the Andes
