= Huamanripayco (Canchis) =

Mountain in Peru

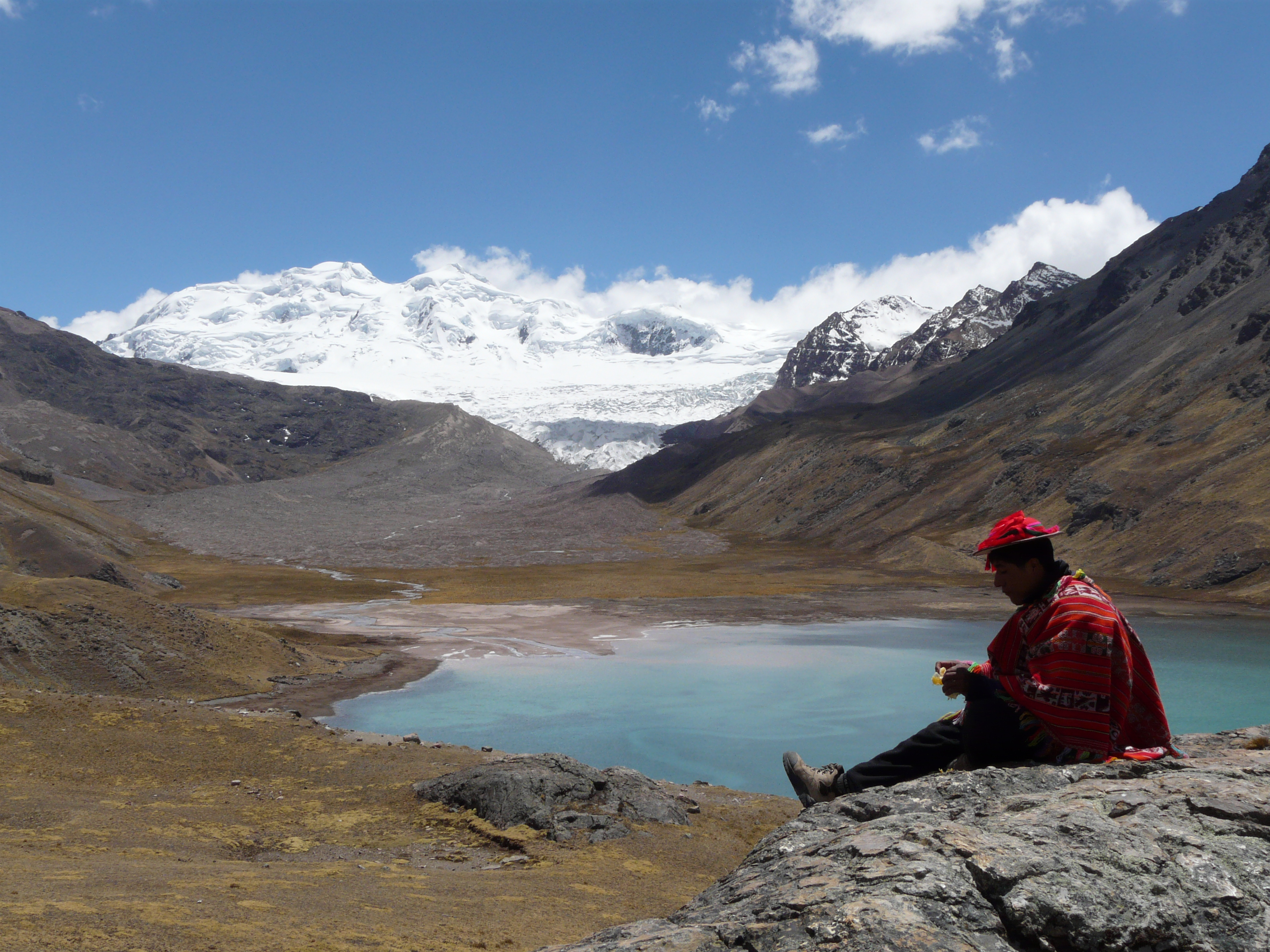
- Chumpe as seen from Sibinacocha. The western slope of Huamanripayco is visible on the right side of this image.

Highest point
- Elevation: 5,200 m (17,100 ft)
- Coordinates: 13°47′39″S 71°03′21″W

Geography
- Location within Peru
- Location: Peru, Cusco Region
- Parent range: Andes, Vilcanota

Huamanripayco (possibly from Quechua wamanripa Senecio, -yuq a suffix, "the one with the wamanripa") is a mountain in the Vilcanota mountain range in the Andes of Peru, about 5,200 m (17,100 ft) high. It is located in the Cusco Region, Canchis Province, Pitumarca District. Huamanripayco lies on the northeastern shore of Sibinacocha.
