= Yana Urqu (Hapu Punta) =

Mountain in Peru

- Location within Peru

Highest point
- Elevation: 4,800 m (15,700 ft)
- Coordinates: 13°43′14″S 70°58′48″W

Naming
- Language of name: Quechua

Geography
- Location: Peru, Cusco Region, Quispicanchi Province
- Parent range: Andes, Willkanuta

Yana Urqu (Quechua yana black, urqu mountain, "black mountain", Hispanicized spelling Yanaorjo) is a mountain in the Willkanuta mountain range in the Andes of Peru, about 4,800 metres (15,748 ft) high. It is situated in the Cusco Region, Quispicanchi Province, Marcapata District. Yana Urqu lies northwest of the mountain Q'illu Wallayuq and northeast of Hapu Punta between the Suralla valley in the west and the Puka Puka valley in the east.
