= Chachacumani (Canchis) =

Mountain in Peru

- Location within Peru

Highest point
- Elevation: 5,000 m (16,000 ft)
- Coordinates: 14°05′21″S 70°51′10″W

Geography
- Location: Peru, Cusco Region
- Parent range: Andes, Vilcanota

Chachacumani (possibly from Quechua chachakuma a medical plant, -ni an Aymara suffix to indicate ownership, "the one with the chachakuma plant) is a mountain in the Vilcanota mountain range in the Andes of Peru, about 5,000 metres (16,404 ft) high. It is located in the Cusco Region, Canchis Province, San Pablo District. Chachacumani lies southwest of Jampatune and Pomanota and southeast of Ojecunca. The Pomanota River, an important tributary of the Vilcanota River, flows along its southern slope.
