= Chachacomayoc =

Mountain in Peru

- Location within Peru

Highest point
- Elevation: 5,100 m (16,700 ft)
- Coordinates: 13°53′57″S 71°19′07″W

Geography
- Location: Peru, Cusco Region
- Parent range: Andes, Vilcanota

Chachacomayoc (possibly from Quechua chachakuma a medical plant, "the one with the chachakuma plant) is a mountain in the Vilcanota mountain range in the Andes of Peru, about 5,100 metres (16,732 ft) high. It is situated in the Cusco Region, Canchis Province, Pitumarca District, and in the Quispicanchi Province, Cusipata District. Chachacomayoc lies southwest of Huasacocha, Jatunrritioc and Yaritani and west of Allcamarina.
