= Orco Puñuna =

Mountain in Peru

- Location within Peru

Highest point
- Elevation: 5,200 m (17,100 ft)
- Coordinates: 13°54′50″S 71°08′37″W

Geography
- Location: Peru, Cusco Region
- Parent range: Andes, Vilcanota

Orco Puñuna (possibly from Quechua urqu mountain; male, puñuna bed, "mountain bed") is a mountain in the western extensions of the Vilcanota mountain range in the Andes of Peru, about 5,076 metres (16,654 ft) high. It is situated in the Cusco Region, Canchis Province, Pitumarca District, east of Sibinacocha. Orco Puñuna lies south of the mountain Othaña and southwest of the mountains Cóndor Tuco, Chuallani and Yana Orjo.
