= Huampuni (mountain) =

Mountain in Peru

- Location within Peru

Highest point
- Elevation: 5,248 m (17,218 ft)
- Coordinates: 13°57′49″S 71°10′37″W

Geography
- Location: Peru, Cusco Region
- Parent range: Andes, Vilcanota

Huampuni (possibly from Aymara wampu boat, -ni a suffix, "the one with a boat") is a 5,248-metre-high (17,218 ft) mountain in the Vilcanota mountain range in the Andes of Peru. It is located in the Cusco Region, Canchis Province, Pitumarca District. Huampuni lies southwest of Sibinacocha. It is situated at the bank of the Yanamayo, a left tributary of the Chillcamayu whose waters flow to the Vilcanota River.

Huampuni is also the name of a little lake near the mountain at 13°58′03″S 71°11′01″W.
