= Canchis province =

Coordinates: 14°17′01″S 71°13′26″W

Canchis
- Province
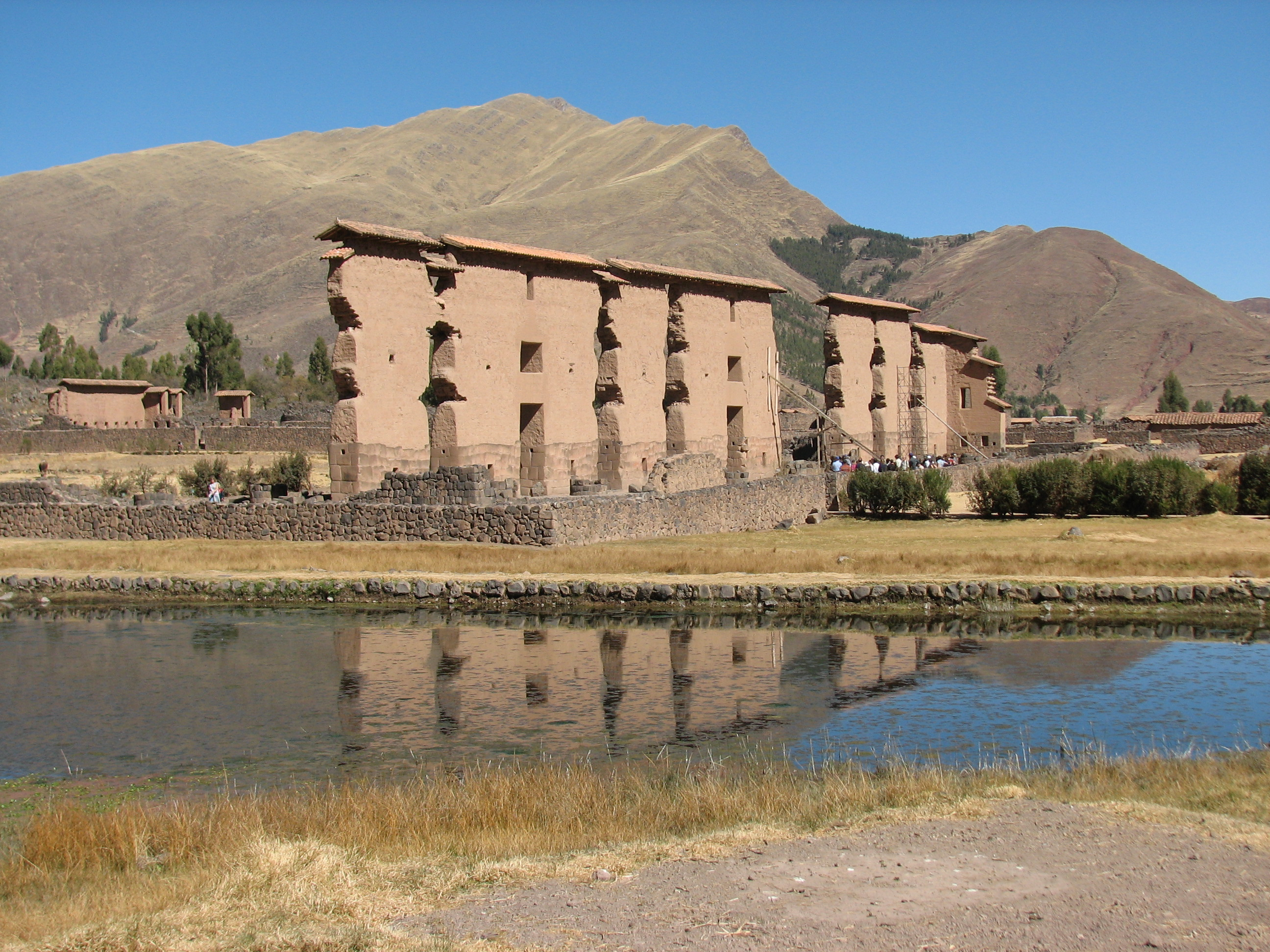
- The Inca ruins in Raqch'i at the Willkanuta River in the Canchis Province are a common tourist attraction on the road between Cusco and Puno.

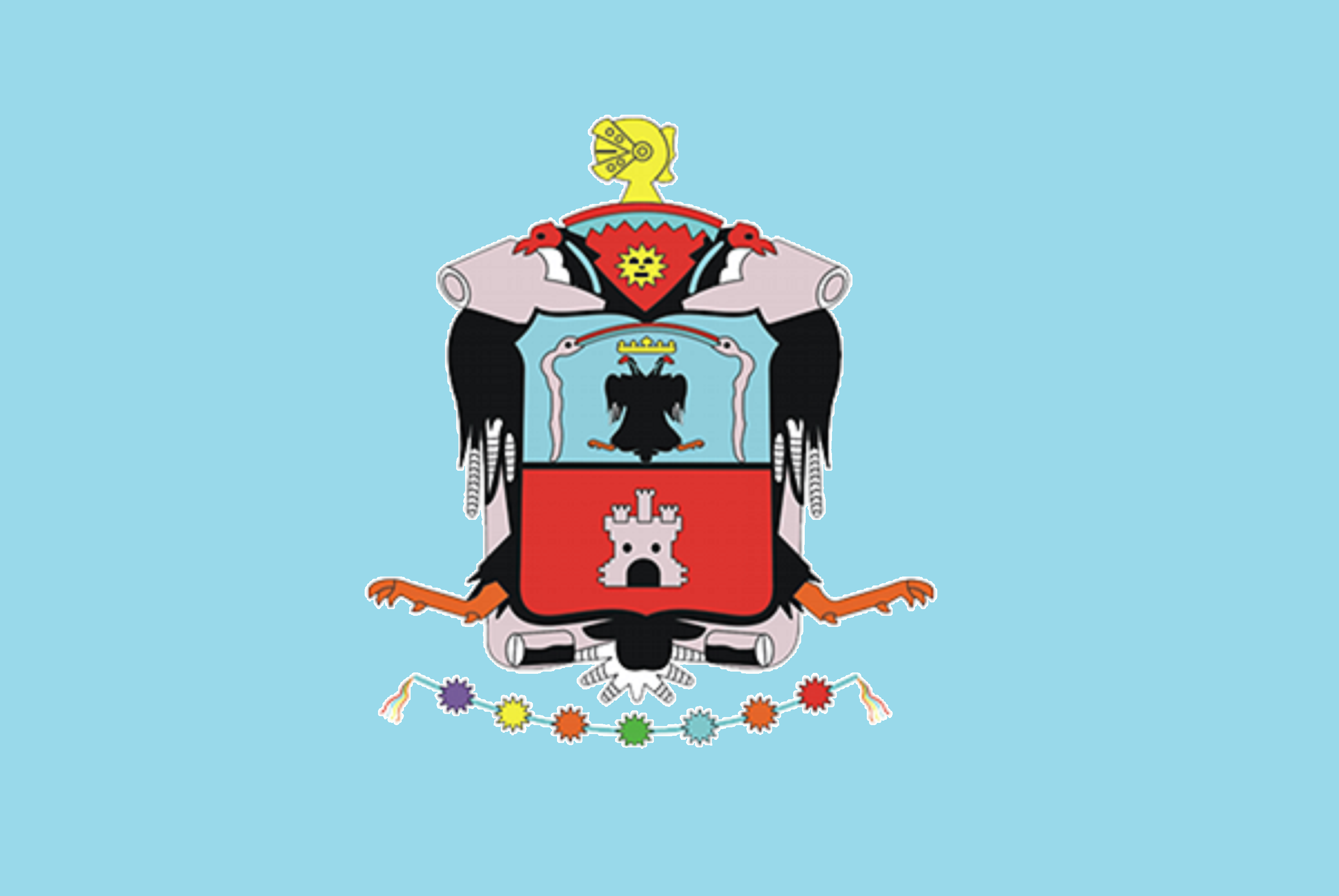
- Flag

- Location of Canchis in the Cusco Region
- Country: Peru
- Region: Cusco
- Founded: October 14, 1833
- Capital: Sicuani

Government
  - Mayor: Jorge Quispe Ccallo

Area
  - Total: 3,999.27 km^{2} (1,544.13 sq mi)

Population
  - Total: 95,774
  - Density: 23.948/km^{2} (62.025/sq mi)
- UBIGEO: 0806
- Website: www.municanchis.gob.pe

Qanchi is one of thirteen provinces in the Department of Cusco in the southern highlands of Peru.

== Geography ==
The Willkanuta River or Willkamayu is one of the largest rivers of the province. Siwinaqucha, the biggest lake in the province, is also one of the biggest lakes in Peru.

The Willkanuta and La Raya mountain ranges traverse the province. One of the highest peaks of the province is Ausangate. Other mountains are listed below:

- Allqamarina
- Anta
- Anti Pukara
- Apu K'uchu
- Aqchi Wachana
- Aqu Muqu
- Chachakumani
- Chachakumayuq
- Chawpi Makitu
- Chawpi Tiyana
- Chilinita
- Chullumpina
- Chumpi
- Chupika
- Chuwallani
- Ch'iyar Jaqhi
- Hapu Punta
- Hatun Ch'aqu
- Hatun K'uchu
- Hatun Ñañu Punta
- Hatun Rit'iyuq
- Hatun Sallika
- Hatun Tiyana
- Hatunuma
- Huch'uy K'uchu
- Huch'uy Milla
- Inka Pirqa
- Inkaqucha
- Istalla
- Inti Qhawana
- Jach'a Sirk'i
- Jamp'atuni
- Japu Japu
- Kimsachata
- Kunkapata
- Kuntur Ikiña
- Kuntur Puñuna
- Kuntur Sallani
- Kuntur Quta
- Kuntur Sayana
- Millu
- Ñawña
- Pawka
- Pichaqani
- Pisqu Pata
- Puka Kunka
- Puka Punta
- Puka Qaqa
- Puka Q'asa
- Puka Salla
- Puka Urqu
- Puka Urqu (Canchis)
- Puma Qaqa
- Puman Tira
- Pumanuta
- Phaq'u
- Phatanka
- Qillqa
- Qillita
- Qillwa Quta
- Qinamari
- Qiwllaqucha
- Qucha K'uchu
- Qullqini
- Qusqu Qhawarina
- Quyllur Puñuna
- Qhupu Kunka
- Q'uli
- Q'uli Pata
- Q'umirqucha
- Q'umirqucha (Checacupe)
- Runku Tawqa
- Sallani
- Sallapata
- Saqsa Ananta
- Sayri K'uchu
- Siwarani
- Sura K'uchu
- Suyu Parina
- Tiklla Q'asa
- Tuqtu
- Tutha Llipiña
- T'ika Pallana
- Unu Lluqsina
- Uqi Unu
- Uriyuq
- Urqu Puñuna
- Usqullu Ananta
- Utt'aña
- Wamanripayuq
- Wampuni
- Wanakuni
- Wanqani Apachita
- Wari Sallana
- Wari Sallani
- Wasaqucha
- Wayra Qaqa
- Wayruru Punku
- Wila Jaqhi
- Wila Kunka
- Wiluyu (Marangani)
- Wiluyu
- Wiqu
- Yana K'uchu
- Yana Qaqa
- Yana Ranra
- Yana Urqu
- Yana Urqu (Canchis)
- Yanaqucha
- Yaritani
- Yayamari
- Yuraq Q'asa

== History ==
After independence, the province was created as the province of Tinta. On October 14, 1833, it was divided into two new provinces: Canchis and Canas. On August 29, 1834, the city of Sicuani became the official capital of the province of Canchis.

== Political division ==
The province is divided into eight districts (Spanish: distritos, singular: distrito), each of which is headed by a mayor (alcalde). The districts, with their capitals in parentheses, are:

- Checacupe (Checacupe)
- Combapata (Combopata)
- Marangani (Marangani)
- Pitumarca (Pitumarca)
- San Pablo (San Pablo)
- San Pedro (San Pedro)
- Sicuani (Sicuani)
- Tinta (Tinta)

== Ethnic groups ==
The people in the province are mainly indigenous citizens of Quechua descent. Quechua is the first language of the majority of the population (58.59%), and Spanish of almost all the rest (41.14%).

== Archaeological sites ==
Raqch'i is an archaeological sites with remains of the Inca period. Other sites in the province are Ayamach'ay, Llamachayuq Qaqa and Machu Pitumarka.

== See also ==
- Chukchu
- Ch'illkamayu
- Saqaqaniqucha
