= Huayruro Punco =

Mountain in Peru

- Location within Peru

Highest point
- Elevation: 5,550 m (18,210 ft)
- Coordinates: 13°47′31″S 71°06′55″W

Geography
- Location: Peru, Cusco Region
- Parent range: Andes, Vilcanota

Huayruro Punco (possibly from Quechua wayruru cockspur coral tree, punku servant; door, entrance, p'unqu pond, reservoir, tank; dam, Aymara wayruru red and black seeds of a plant (Abrus precatorius, Ormosia coccinea and Ormosia minor); also meaning something very beautiful, punqu door, pünqu (ü stand for a long u) a heap of little stones,) is a mountain in the Vilcanota mountain range in the Andes of Peru, about 5,550 metres (18,209 ft) high. It is situated in the Cusco Region, Canchis Province, Pitumarca District. Huayruro Punco lies southeast of Callangate, southwest of Chumpe and north of Cóndor Tuco and Comercocha, between the Chillcamayu which originates near Huayruro Punco and the lake named Sibinacocha.

== See also ==
- Yanajaja
