= Puma Qaqa =

Mountain in Peru

- Location within Peru

Highest point
- Elevation: 4,800 m (15,700 ft)
- Coordinates: 14°00′53″S 71°17′22″W

Geography
- Location: Peru, Cusco Region, Canchis Province
- Parent range: Andes

Puma Qaqa (Quechua puma cougar, puma, qaqa rock, "cougar rock", Hispanicized spelling Pumacaca) is a mountain in the Cusco Region in the Andes of Peru, about 4,800 m (15,700 ft) high. It is situated in the Canchis Province, on the border of the districts of Checacupe and Pitumarca. Puma Qaqa lies northwest of Chupika.
