= Huancane Apacheta =

Mountain in Peru near Cusco

- Location within Peru

Highest point
- Elevation: 5,200 m (17,100 ft)
- Coordinates: 14°00′52″S 70°51′17″W

Geography
- Location: Peru
- Parent range: Andes, Vilcanota

Huancane Apacheta (possibly from Aymara wanqa a big stone, -ni a suffix, wanqani "the one with a stone (or stones)", apachita the place of transit of an important pass in the principal routes of the Andes; name in the Andes for a stone cairn built along the trail in the high mountains) is a mountain in the Vilcanota mountain range in the Andes of Peru, about 5,200 metres (17,060 ft) high. It is located in the Cusco Region, Canchis Province, Checacupe District, and in the Puno Region, Carabaya Province, Corani District. Huancane Apacheta lies between the mountain Otoroncane in the northeast and Tutallipina and Sayrecucho in the southwest.

Huancane is the name of the river which originates northeast of the mountain. Its waters flow to the Vilcanota River.
