= Combapata District =

Coordinates: 14.1011°S 71.4311°W

Combapata Kumpa Pata
- District
- Interactive map of Combapata
- Country: Peru
- Region: Cusco
- Province: Canchis
- Founded: November 22, 1912
- Capital: Combapata

Government
  - Mayor: Florentino Pumalla Laura

Area
  - Total: 182.5 km^{2} (70.5 sq mi)
- Elevation: 3,475 m (11,401 ft)

Population (2005 census)
  - Total: 5,128
  - Density: 28.10/km^{2} (72.78/sq mi)
- Time zone: UTC-5 (PET)
- UBIGEO: 080603

Combapata District is one of eight districts of the province Canchis in Peru.

== Geography ==
One of the highest peaks of the district is Inka Pirqa at 5,075 m (16,650 ft). Other mountains are listed below:

- Awkisa
- Kuntur Ikiña
- Puka Urqu
- Wayna Kuntur

The most important rivers of the district are the Willkanuta on the western border of the district and the Sallqa Mayu, one of its right tributaries.

== Ethnic groups ==
The people in the district are mainly indigenous citizens of Quechua descent. Quechua is the language which the majority of the population (76.08%) learnt to speak in childhood, 23.80% of the residents started speaking using the Spanish language (2007 Peru Census).

== See also ==
- Ayamach'ay
- Llamachayuq Qaqa
