= Pucasalla =

Mountain in Peru

- Location within Peru

Highest point
- Elevation: 5,400 m (17,700 ft)
- Coordinates: 13°50′17″S 70°54′37″W

Geography
- Location: Peru, Cusco Region
- Parent range: Andes, Vilcanota

Pucasalla (possibly from Quechua puka red, salla large cliff of gravel, "red cliff of gravel") is a mountain in the Vilcanota mountain range in the Andes of Peru, about 5,400 metres (17,717 ft) high. It is located in the Cusco Region, Canchis Province, Pitumarca District, east of Sibinacocha. It lies south of the peak of Condoriquiña.
