= Sihuarani =

Mountain in Peru

- Location within Peru

Highest point
- Elevation: 5,000 m (16,000 ft)
- Coordinates: 14°05′16″S 70°57′12″W

Geography
- Location: Peru, Cusco Region
- Parent range: Andes, Vilcanota

Sihuarani (possibly from Aymara siwara barley, "the one with barley") is a mountain in the Vilcanota mountain range in the Andes of Peru, about 5,000 metres (16,404 ft) high. It is located in the Cusco Region, Canchis Province, Checacupe District. Sihuarani lies southwest of Cóndor Sallani. The Llancamayo flows along its southern slope.
