= Inka Pirqa (disambiguation) =

Inka Pirqa (Quechua for "Inca wall", also spelled Inca Perkha, Incaperca, Ingapirca) or Inka Pirka (Kichwa for "Inca wall") may refer to:

- Ingapirca, a town with an archaeological site of that name in Ecuador
- Inka Pirqa (Bolivia), a mountain in Bolivia
- Inka Pirqa, a mountain in Peru
