= Checacupe District =

Coordinates: 14.0254°S 71.4536°W

Checacupe Ch'iqa Kupi
- District
- Interactive map of Checacupe
- Country: Peru
- Region: Cusco
- Province: Canchis
- Capital: Checacupe

Government
  - Mayor: Percy Cueva Bolaños

Area
  - Total: 962.34 km^{2} (371.56 sq mi)
- Elevation: 3,446 m (11,306 ft)

Population (2005 census)
  - Total: 5,650
  - Density: 5.87/km^{2} (15.2/sq mi)
- Time zone: UTC-5 (PET)
- UBIGEO: 080602

Checacupe or Ch'iqa Kupi (Aymara ch'iqa left, kupi right, "left right") is one of eight districts of the Canchis Province in the Cusco Region in Peru.

== Geography ==
The Willkanuta mountain range traverses the district. Some of the highest peaks of the district are listed below:

- Anta
- Aqchi Wachana
- Aqu Muqu
- Chawpi Wasi
- Chupika
- Ch'uxña Quta
- Inti Qhawana
- Jach'a Sirk'i
- Kancha Pata
- Kanchayuq Punta
- Kuntur Puñuna
- Kuntur Sallani
- Millu
- Minas Qullu
- Pichaqani
- Puka Sallayuq
- Pisqu Pata
- Phatanka
- Puma Qaqa
- Puman Tira
- P'anta Qaqa
- Qillwa Qucha
- Qinamari
- Qullpa K'uchu
- Qusqu Qhawarina
- Quyllur Puñuna
- Q'illu Muqu
- Q'uli
- Q'umirqucha
- Runku Tawqa
- Sallani
- Sayri K'uchu
- Siwarani
- Sut'uq
- Tutha Llipiña
- Tuqlla Muqu
- T'ika Pallana
- Unu Lluqsina
- Uqa Nasa
- Uqi Kunka
- Urqu Puñunan
- Wamanripani
- Wanakuni
- Wanqani Apachita
- Wari Muru
- Wari Sallana
- Wari Sallani
- Warmi Qaqa
- Wayna Kuntur
- Wayra Qaqa
- Wila Kunka
- Willk'i
- Yanaqucha

The most important rivers of the district are the Willkanuta River and Ch'illkamayu, one of its right tributaries.

== Ethnic groups ==
The people in the district are mainly indigenous citizens of Quechua descent. Quechua is the language which the majority of the population (82.89%) learnt to speak in childhood, 17.09% of the residents started speaking using the Spanish language (2007 Peru Census).
