= Uchuy Milla =

Mountain in Peru

- Location within Peru

Highest point
- Elevation: 5,300 m (17,400 ft)
- Coordinates: 13°47′28″S 71°05′45″W

Geography
- Location: Peru, Cusco Region
- Parent range: Andes, Vilcanota

Uchuy Milla (possibly from Quechua huch'uy (in Bolivia juch'uy) little, milla instep,) is a mountain in the Vilcanota mountain range in the Andes of Peru, about 5,300 metres (17,388 ft) high. It is located in the Cusco Region, Canchis Province, Pitumarca District, northwest of Sibinacocha. It lies south of the peak of Pajo.
