= Runcu Tauja =

Mountain in Peru

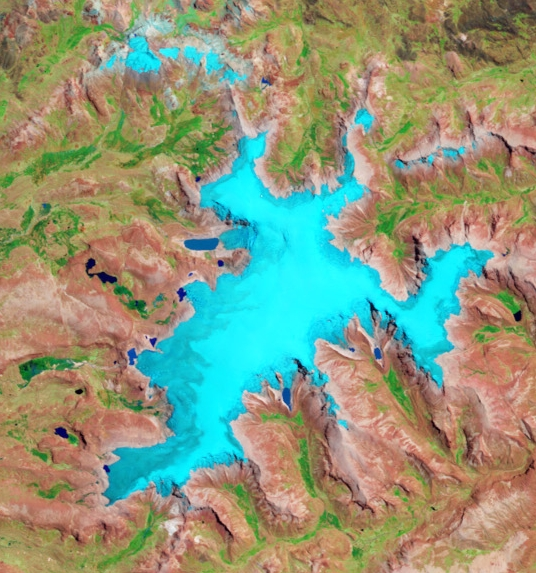
- The glaciated Quelccaya area (center) and Runcu Tauja shown in the upper left part of this image (NASA, 2010)

Highest point
- Elevation: 5,200 m (17,100 ft)
- Coordinates: 13°50′33″S 70°51′46″W

Geography
- Location within Peru
- Location: Peru, Cusco Region, Puno Region
- Parent range: Andes, Vilcanota

Runcu Tauja (possibly from Quechua runku basket, tawqa pile, heap, "basket heap") is a mountain in the Vilcanota mountain range in the Andes of Peru, about 5,200 metres (17,060 ft) high. It is located in the Cusco Region, Canchis Province, Checacupe District, and in the Puno Region, Carabaya Province, Corani District. Runcu Tauja lies northwest of the glaciated area of Quelccaya (Quechua for "snow plain"), west of Quimsachata and north of Millo.
