= Othana =

Othana (or Othaña) may refer to the following places and jurisdictions :

- Ottana, an Italian town, former bishopric and titular see on Sardina
- Utt'aña
