= Pichacani (Cusco) =

Mountain in Peru near Cusco

- Location within Peru

Highest point
- Elevation: 5,200 m (17,100 ft)
- Coordinates: 13°49′07″S 71°05′33″W

Naming
- English translation: the one with a big needle
- Language of name: Aymara

Geography
- Location: Peru
- Parent range: Andes, Vilcanota

Pichacani (possibly from Aymara pichaqa, phichaqa, piqacha a big needle, -ni a suffix to indicate ownership, "the one with a big needle") is a mountain in the Vilcanota mountain range in the Andes of Peru, about 5,200 metres (17,060 ft) high. It is located in the Cusco Region, Canchis Province, Pitumarca District. Pichacani lies between the mountain Comercocha in the west and the lake Sibinacocha in the east.
