= Quenamari (Cusco) =

Mountain in Peru

- Location within Peru

Highest point
- Elevation: 5,054 m (16,581 ft)
- Coordinates: 14°02′50″S 70°55′07″W

Naming
- Language of name: Quechua

Geography
- Location: Peru, Cusco Region, Canchis Province, Checacupe District
- Parent range: Andes, Vilcanota

Quenamari (possibly from in the Aymara or Quechua spelling Qinamari) is a 5,054-metre-high (16,581 ft) mountain in the Vilcanota mountain range in the Andes of Peru. It is located in the Cusco Region, Canchis Province, Checacupe District. Quenamari lies southwest of the glaciated area of Quelccaya (Quechua for "snow plain"): It is situated between a mountain named Comercocha in the north and Cuzcoccahuarina in the south, north of the Llanca Mayo.
