= Ojecunca =

Mountain in Peru

- Location within Peru

Highest point
- Elevation: 5,000 m (16,000 ft)
- Coordinates: 14°04′59″S 70°52′26″W

Geography
- Location: Peru, Cusco Region
- Parent range: Andes, Vilcanota

Ojecunca (possibly from Aymara uqi brown, grey brown, kunka throat, Quechua uqi lead-colored, lead, kunka throat, "brown (or lead-colored) throat") is a mountain in the Vilcanota mountain range in the Andes of Peru, about 5,000 metres (16,404 ft) high. It is located in the Cusco Region, Canchis Province, in the districts of Checacupe and San Pablo. Ojecunca lies southwest of Jampatune and Pomanota. The Pumanuta River, an important tributary of the Vilcanota River, flows along its southern slope.
