= Ñauña =

Mountain in Peru

- Location within Peru

Highest point
- Elevation: 5,100 m (16,700 ft)
- Coordinates: 13°55′19″S 71°12′38″W

Geography
- Location: Peru, Cusco Region
- Parent range: Andes

Ñauña (possibly from Quechua for arête) is a mountain in the Andes of Peru, about 5,100 metres (16,732 ft) high. It is located in the Cusco Region, Canchis Province, Pitumarca District, near the Vilcanota mountain range. Ñauña lies on a ridge between the rivers Chillcamayu and Yanamayu. It is situated northeast of the peak of Queullacocha and the lake of the same name.
