= Huarisallana =

Mountain in Peru

- Location within Peru

Highest point
- Elevation: 5,000 m (16,000 ft)
- Coordinates: 13°59′41″S 71°07′16″W

Geography
- Location: Peru, Cusco Region
- Parent range: Andes, Vilcanota

Huarisallana (possibly from Aymara wari vicuña, salla rocks, cliffs, Quechua salla large cliff of gravel, -na a suffix) is a mountain in the Vilcanota mountain range in the Andes of Peru, about 5,000 m (16,000 ft) high. It is located in the Cusco Region, Canchis Province, Checacupe District. Huarisallana lies near the Sequeñamayu valley, south of Intijahuana.
