= Culipata =

Mountain in Peru

- Location within Peru

Highest point
- Elevation: 5,172 m (16,969 ft)
- Coordinates: 13°50′09″S 71°01′11″W

Geography
- Location: Peru, Cusco Region
- Parent range: Andes, Vilcanota

Culipata (possibly from Aymara q'uli stripes of different colors on the shirt or undershirt which the Andean people wear, pata stone bench, step, "striped stone bench" or "striped step") is a 5,172-metre-high (16,969 ft) mountain in the Vilcanota mountain range in the Andes of Peru. It is located in the Cusco Region, Canchis Province, Pitumarca District. Culipata lies at the eastern shore of Sibinacocha.
