= Othaña =

Mountain in Peru near Cusco

- Location within Peru

Highest point
- Elevation: 5,200 m (17,100 ft)
- Coordinates: 13°53′59″S 71°08′40″W

Geography
- Location: Peru, Cusco Region
- Parent range: Andes, Vilcanota

Othaña (possibly from Aymara for seat,) is a mountain in the western extensions of the Vilcanota mountain range in the Andes of Peru, about 5,200 metres (17,060 ft) high. It is situated in the Cusco Region, Canchis Province, Pitumarca District, east of Sibinacocha. Othaña lies southwest of Cóndor Tuco and Chuallani, west of Yana Orjo and north of Orco Puñuna.
