= Quello Huallayoc =

Mountain in Peru

- Location within Peru

Highest point
- Elevation: 5,000 m (16,000 ft)
- Coordinates: 13°43′42″S 70°57′19″W

Naming
- Language of name: Aymara

Geography
- Location: Peru
- Parent range: Andes, Vilcanota

Quello Huallayoc (possibly from Quechua q'illu yellow, walla mountain range, -yuq a suffix to indicate ownership, "the one with the yellow range") is a mountain in the Vilcanota mountain range in the Andes of Peru, about 5,000 metres (16,404 ft) high. It is located in the Cusco Region, Quispicanchi Province, Marcapata District. Quello Huallayoc lies southwest of the peak of Ccolcce and northeast of Yayamari and Huila Aje at the Yayamari valley.
