= Wila Kunka (disambiguation) =

Wila Kunka, or Vela Cunca, is a mountain in the Carabaya mountain range, Peru.

Wila Kunka may also refer to:

- Wila Kunka (Bolivia), a mountain in the La Paz Department, Bolivia
- Wila Kunka (Corani), a mountain in the Corani District, Carabaya Province, Puno Region, Peru
- Wila Kunka (Cusco), a mountain in the Cusco Region, Peru
- Wila Kunka Pata, Los Andes Province, Bolivia
