= Piscopata =

Mountain in Peru

- Location within Peru

Highest point
- Elevation: 5,037 m (16,526 ft)
- Coordinates: 14°02′31″S 70°53′59″W

Geography
- Location: Peru
- Parent range: Andes, Vilcanota

Piscopata (possibly from Quechua pisqu bird, pata step, bank of a river, "bird bank (or step)") is a 5,037-metre-high (16,526 ft) mountain in the Vilcanota mountain range in the Andes of Peru. It is situated in the Cusco Region, Canchis Province, Checacupe District. Piscopata lies southwest of Sayrecucho.
