= Soracucho =

Mountain in Peru

- Location within Peru

Highest point
- Elevation: 5,000 m (16,000 ft)
- Coordinates: 14°09′03″S 70°58′14″W

Geography
- Location: Peru, Cusco Region
- Parent range: Andes, Vilcanota

Soracucho (possibly from Aymara sura dry jiquima, a species of Pachyrhizus, k'uchu, q'uch'u corner, "sura corner") is a mountain in the Vilcanota mountain range in the Andes of Peru, about 5,000 metres (16,404 ft) high. It is in the Cusco Region, Canchis Province, San Pablo District. Soracucho lies southwest of Collpacucho and south of Yurac Uno Cunca. The Pumanuta River, an important tributary of the Vilcanota River, flows along its northern slope.
