= Chullumpina =

Mountain in Peru

- Location within Peru

Highest point
- Elevation: 5,200 m (17,100 ft)
- Coordinates: 13°51′19″S 71°05′54″W

Geography
- Location: Peru, Cusco Region
- Parent range: Andes, Vilcanota mountain range

Chullumpina (from chullumpi, a local name for the white-tufted grebe, and Quechuan suffix -na, lit. "the place of the white-tufted grebe") is a mountain in the Vilcanota mountain range in the Andes of Peru, about 5,200 m (17,100 ft) high. It is situated in the Cusco Region, Canchis Province, Pitumarca District. Chullumpina lies west of the large lake named Sibinacocha.

Chullumpina is also the name of a little lake near the mountain at 13°51′39″S 71°05′43″W.
