= Nauna =

Nauna may be,

- Nauna language, New Guinea
- Nauna language (Brazil)
- Ñauña, Andes mountain
