= Pucajasa (Canchis) =

Mountain in Peru

- Location within Peru

Highest point
- Elevation: 5,165 m (16,946 ft)
- Coordinates: 13°51′02″S 71°08′54″W

Geography
- Location: Peru, Cusco Region
- Parent range: Andes, Vilcanota

Pucajasa (possibly from Quechua puka red, q'asa mountain pass, "red pass") is a 5,165-metre-high (16,946 ft) mountain in the Vilcanota mountain range in the Andes of Peru. It is situated in the Cusco Region, Canchis Province, Pitumarca District. Pucajasa lies west of Cóndor Tuco. The Killitamayu flows along its slope.
