= Culi (mountain) =

Mountain in Peru

- Location within Peru

Highest point
- Elevation: 5,290 m (17,360 ft)
- Coordinates: 14°03′53″S 70°49′52″W

Geography
- Location: Peru
- Parent range: Andes, Vilcanota

Culi, or Nevado Culi, (possibly from Aymara for stripes of different colors on the shirt or undershirt which the Andean people wear) is a 5,290-metre-high (17,356 ft) mountain in the Vilcanota mountain range in the Andes of Peru. It is situated in the Cusco Region, Canchis Province, Checacupe District, and in the Puno Region, Carabaya Province, Corani District. Culi lies south of the mountain Otoroncane, west of Sapanuta, northwest of Pomanota and Jampatune and southeast of Sayrecucho and Tutallipina. The river Pomanota originates southeast of the mountain. It flows to the southwest as a tributary of Vilcanota River.

The first reported ascent of Nevado Culi was achieved on 13 November 2025 by a team composed of Andrew Thorburn (USA), Ulli Bayer (USA), Daniel Choquet (France) and Vito Ricciardi (Wales), under the leadership of John Biggar (of Andes.org.uk).

The absence of any human remains, cairns, or signs of previous passage observed during the ascent suggests that no earlier climb of the peak is documented in recent history. A small three-stone cairn was built by the team at the summit on the day of the ascent.

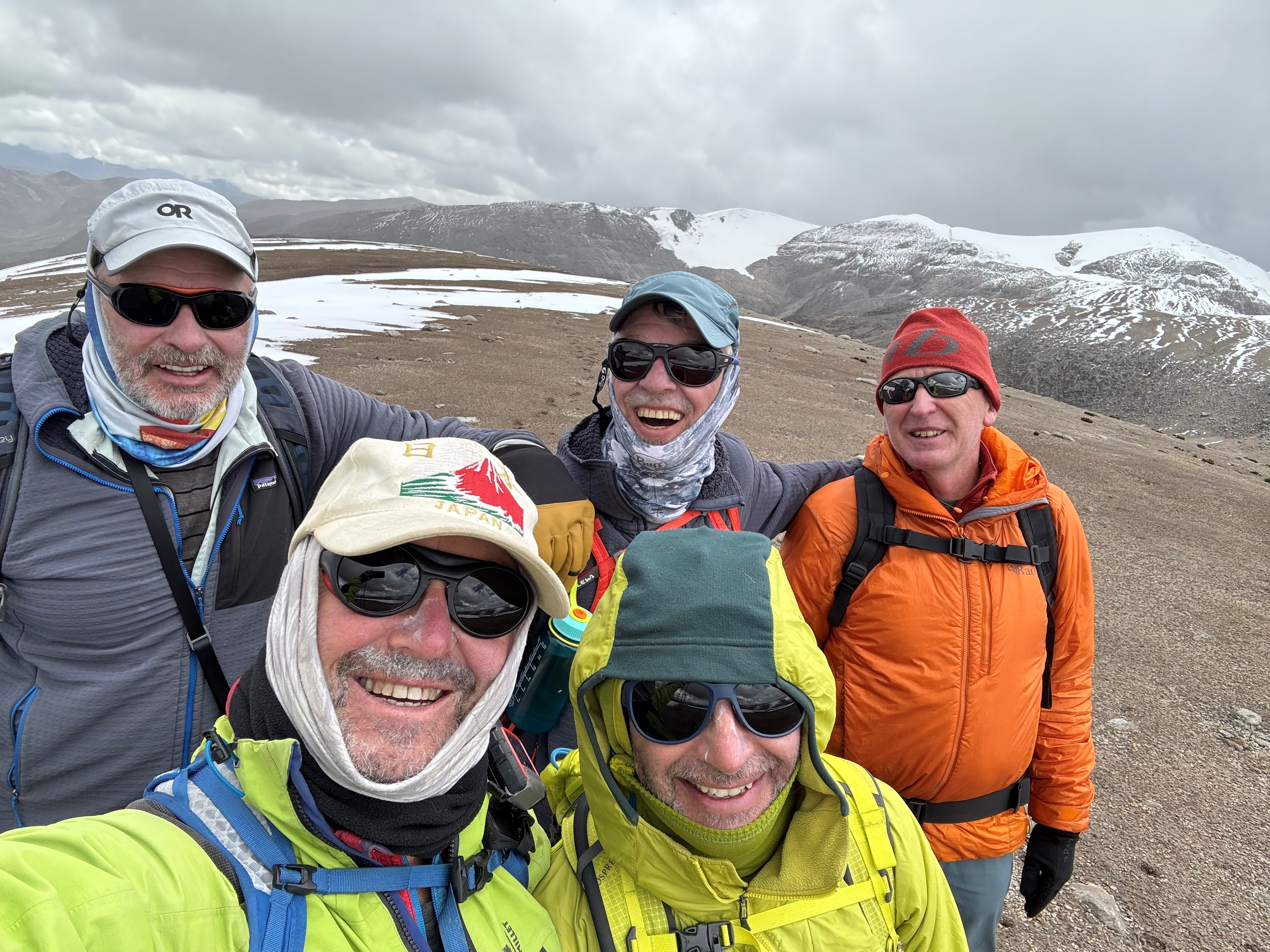
Team achieving the first documented ascent of Nevada Culi on November 13th 2025. Top, from left to right: Andrew Thorburn (USA), Ulli Bayer (USA), John Biggar (Scotland). Bottom, from left to right: Daniel Choquet (France), Vito Ricciardi (Wales). Nevado Pumanota is in the background on the far right.

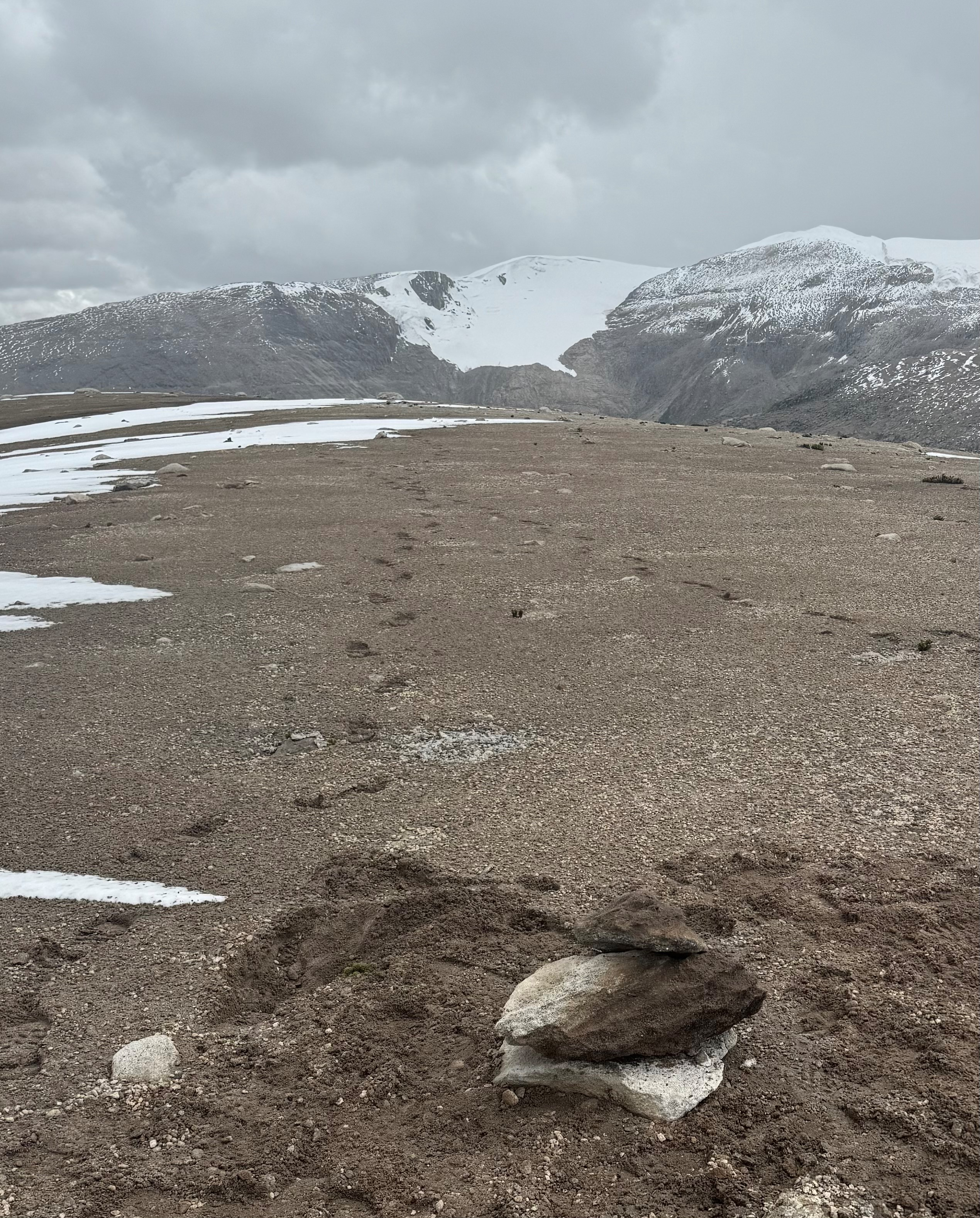
Cairn installed on the summit of Nevada Culi by the first ascent team on November 13th 2025. "Pumanota Norte" in the background on the right.
