= Chuallani =

Mountain in Peru

- Location within Peru

Highest point
- Elevation: 5,300 m (17,400 ft)
- Coordinates: 13°52′55″S 71°07′25″W

Geography
- Location: Peru, Cusco Region
- Parent range: Andes, Vilcanota mountain range

Chuallani (possibly from Aymara chuwalla a variety of potatoes, -ni a suffix to indicate ownership, "the one with the chuwalla") is a mountain in the Vilcanota mountain range in the Andes of Peru, about 5,300 metres (17,388 ft) high. It is situated in the Cusco Region, Canchis Province, Pitumarca District. Chuallani lies west of the lake Sibinacocha, south of the mountain Cóndor Tuco. The river Chuamayu (possibly from in the Quechua spelling Chuwamayu) which originates northeast of Chuallani flows along its eastern slopes. It belongs to the watershed of the Vilcanota River.
