= Jatunñaño Punta =

Mountain in Peru

- Location within Peru

Highest point
- Elevation: 5,812 m (19,068 ft)
- Coordinates: 13°45′07″S 71°02′14″W

Geography
- Location: Peru, Cusco Region
- Parent range: Andes, Vilcanota

Jatunñaño Punta or Jatunñano Punta (possibly from Quechua hatun (in Bolivia always jatun) big, ñañu thin (cylindrical objects), slim, punta peak; ridge; first, before, in front of,) is a mountain in the Vilcanota mountain range in the Andes of Peru, about 5,812 metres (19,068 ft) high. It is situated in the Cusco Region, Canchis Province, Pitumarca District, and in the Quispicanchi Province, Marcapata District. Jatunñaño Punta lies north of the lake Sibinacocha.

== See also ==
- Yayamari
