= Jatunrritioc =

Mountain in Peru

- Location within Peru

Highest point
- Elevation: 5,080 m (16,670 ft)
- Coordinates: 13°52′25″S 71°18′04″W

Geography
- Location: Peru, Cusco Region
- Parent range: Andes, Vilcanota

Jatunrritioc (possibly from Quechua hatun big, rit'i snow, -yuq a suffix to indicate ownership "the big one with snow") is a mountain in the Vilcanota mountain range in the Andes of Peru, 5,080 metres (16,667 ft) high. It lies in the Cusco Region, Canchis Province, Pitumarca District, and in the Quispicanchi Province, Cusipata District. Jatunrritioc is situated south of the mountain Huasacocha, north-west of the mountain Yaritani and north-east of the mountain Chachacomayoc.
