= Jupucunca =

Mountain in Peru

- Location within Peru

Highest point
- Elevation: 5,295 m (17,372 ft)
- Coordinates: 14°09′56″S 70°54′28″W

Geography
- Location: Peru
- Parent range: Andes, Vilcanota

Jupucunca (possibly from Quechua qhupu hump, kunka throat, gullet, "hump throat") is a 5,295-metre-high (17,372 ft) mountain in the Vilcanota mountain range in the Andes of Peru. It is situated in the Cusco Region, Canchis Province, on the border of the districts of San Pablo and Sicuani.
