= Yanajaja =

Mountain in Peru

- Location within Peru

Highest point
- Elevation: 5,550 m (18,210 ft)
- Coordinates: 13°47′16″S 71°11′02″W

Geography
- Location: Peru, Cusco
- Parent range: Andes, Vilcanota

Yanajaja (possibly from Quechua yana black, qaqa, rock) is a mountain in the Vilcanota mountain range in the Andes of Peru, about 5,550 m (18,210 ft) high. It is situated in the Cusco Region, Canchis Province, Pitumarca District and in the Quispicanchi Province, Ocongate District. Yanajaja lies south of the peak of Q'ampa, southwest of Callangate, west of the river Chillcamayu, and east of Ausangate, close to Chilinita (Santa Catalina).

== See also ==
- Huayruro Punco
