= Wila Kunka (Cusco) =

Mountain in Peru

- Location within Peru

Highest point
- Elevation: 5,000 m (16,000 ft)
- Coordinates: 14°01′38″S 71°09′34″W

Geography
- Location: Peru, Cusco Region, Canchis Province
- Parent range: Andes

Wila Kunka (Aymara wila blood, blood-red, kunka throat, "red throat", hispanicized spelling Velacunca) is a mountain in the Cusco Region in the Andes of Peru, about 5,000 m (16,000 ft) high. It is situated in the Canchis Province, Checacupe District. Wila Kunka lies at the left bank of the Chawchamayu (Chauchamayo), northwest of Qusqu Qhawarina.
