= Yanacocha (Canchis) =

Mountain in Peru

- Location within Peru

Highest point
- Elevation: 5,025 m (16,486 ft)
- Coordinates: 13°58′37″S 70°54′05″W

Naming
- Language of name: Quechua

Geography
- Location: Peru, Cusco Region, Canchis Province
- Parent range: Andes, Vilcanota

Yanacocha (possibly from Quechua yana black, qucha lake, "black lake") is a 5,025-metre-high (16,486 ft) mountain in the Vilcanota mountain range in the Andes of Peru. It is located in Checacupe District, Canchis Province, Cusco Region. Yanacocha lies southwest of the glaciated area of Quelccaya (Quechua for "snow plain"), north of the Huancane River.
