= Huarurumicocha =

Lake in Peru

- Location within Peru
- Location: Peru; Cusco Region
- Coordinates: 13°43′24″S 71°6′49″W

Huarurumicocha (possibly from Quechua Warurumiqucha; waru = stony ground + rumi = stone + qucha = lake) is a lake in the Vilcanota mountain range in Peru. It is situated in the Cusco Region, Quispicanchi Province, Ocongate District. The lake lies north-east of the mountain Hatunuma and west of the mountain Chumpe.
