= Huasacocha =

Mountain in Peru

- Location within Peru

Highest point
- Elevation: 5,400 m (17,700 ft)
- Coordinates: 13°50′39″S 71°17′55″W

Geography
- Location: Peru, Cusco Region
- Parent range: Andes, Vilcanota

Huasacocha (possibly from Quechua wasa the human back or the back of an animal, qucha lake, "back lake") is a mountain at a small lake of the same name in the Vilcanota mountain range in the Andes of Peru, about 5,400 metres (17,717 ft) high. It lies in the Cusco Region, Canchis Province, Pitumarca District, and in the Quispicanchi Province, in the districts Cusipata and Ocongate. Huasacocha is situated south-west of the mountain Sorimani and north of the mountain Jatunrritioc. There are two small lakes south-east of the mountain named Quiullacocha ("gull lake") and Surini.

The lake Huasacocha lies south-west of the peak at 13°51′41″S 71°19′08″W. The river Pucamayo ("red river") originates at the lake. It flows to the west as a right tributary of the Vilcanota River.
