= Comercocha (Canchis) =

Mountain in Peru

- Location within Peru

Highest point
- Elevation: 5,400 m (17,700 ft)
- Coordinates: 13°49′06″S 71°07′31″W

Geography
- Location: Peru, Cusco Region
- Parent range: Andes, Vilcanota

Comercocha (possibly from Quechua q'umir green, qucha lake, "green lake") is a mountain in the Vilcanota mountain range in the Andes of Peru, about 5,400 metres (17,717 ft) high. It is situated in the Cusco Region, Canchis Province, Pitumarca District. Comercocha lies west of the lake Sibinacocha and the mountain Pichacani, between the mountain Huayruro Punco in the northeast and the Cóndor Tuco in the south.
