= Wari Sallani =

Mountain in Peru

- Location within Peru

Highest point
- Elevation: 5,061 m (16,604 ft)
- Coordinates: 14°05′56″S 71°02′16″W

Geography
- Location: Peru, Cusco Region
- Parent range: Andes

Wari Sallani (Aymara wari vicuña, salla rocks, cliffs, -ni a suffix, "cliffs with vicuñas", also spelled Huarisallani) is a 5,061-metre-high (16,604 ft) mountain in the Andes of Peru. It is located in the Cusco Region, Canchis Province, on the border of the districts of Checacupe and San Pablo. Wari Sallana lies near the Chhuyumayu valley, southeast of Jach'a Sirk'i.
