= Yayamari =

Mountain in the Andes

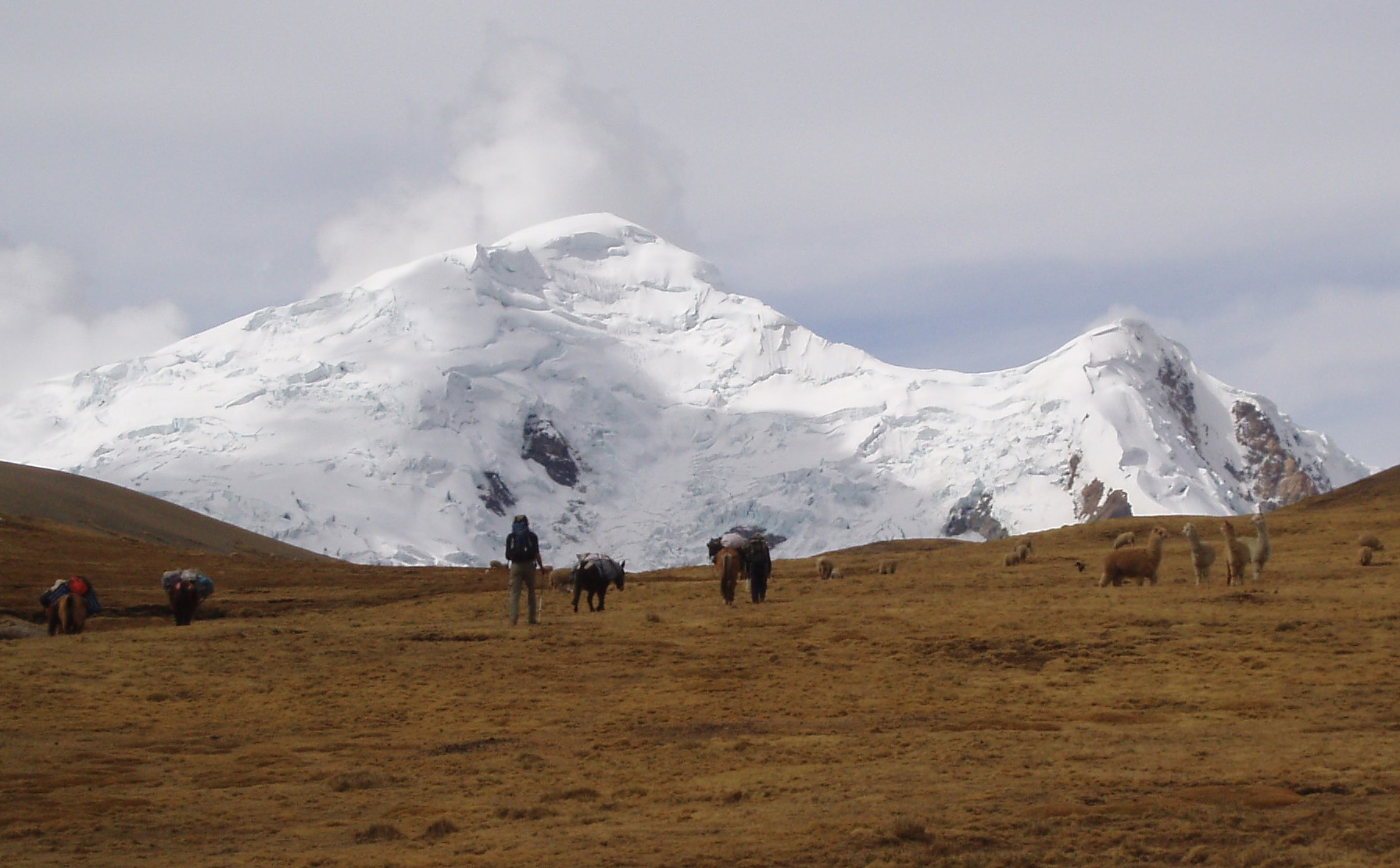
- Yayamari from the east.

Highest point
- Elevation: 6,049 m (19,846 ft)
- Prominence: 722 m (2,369 ft)
- Parent peak: Alcamarinayoc
- Coordinates: 13°46′00″S 70°58′54″W

Geography
- Location within Peru
- Location: Peru, Cusco Region
- Parent range: Andes, Vilcanota

Climbing
- First ascent: 15/8/57 - Günther Hauser, Theodore Achilles, Bernhard Kuhn (Germany)

Yayamari (other names: Ambrocca or Ambroja in Hispanicized spellings or Montura) is a mountain in the Vilcanota mountain range in the Andes of Peru, about 6,049 metres (19,846 ft) high. It is situated in the Cusco Region, Canchis Province, Pitumarca District, and in the Quispicanchi Province, Marcapata District. Yayamari lies northeast of Sibinacocha, north of the lake named Amayuni and northwest of Huila Aje and Condoriquiña.

== Elevation ==
Other data from available digital elevation models: SRTM yields 6016 metres, ASTER 5984 metres, ALOS 6023 metres and TanDEM-X 6071 metres. The height of the nearest key col is 5327 meters, leading to a topographic prominence of 722 meters. Yayamari is considered a Mountain Subgroup according to the Dominance System and its dominance is 11.94%. Its parent peak is Alcamarinayoc and the Topographic isolation is 14.4 kilometers.

== First Ascent ==
Yayamari was first climbed by Günther Hauser, Theodore Achilles, Bernhard Kuhn (Germany) on August 15, 1957.

== See also ==
- Aquichua
