= Cóndor Tuco =

Mountain in Peru

- Location within Peru

Highest point
- Elevation: 5,550 m (18,210 ft)
- Coordinates: 13°50′57″S 71°08′07″W

Geography
- Location: Peru, Cusco Region
- Parent range: Andes, Vilcanota

Cóndor Tuco or Condortuco (possibly from Quechua kuntur condor, t'uqu a niche, hole or gap in the wall, "condor niche") is a mountain in the Vilcanota mountain range in the Andes of Peru, about 5,550 metres (18,209 ft) high. It is situated in the Cusco Region, Canchis Province, Pitumarca District. Cóndor Tuco lies between the Chillcamayu in the west and the lake named Sibinacocha in the east, south of Jatunhuma, Huayruro Punco and Comercocha.

== See also ==
- Yanajaja
