= Unollocsina =

Mountain in Peru

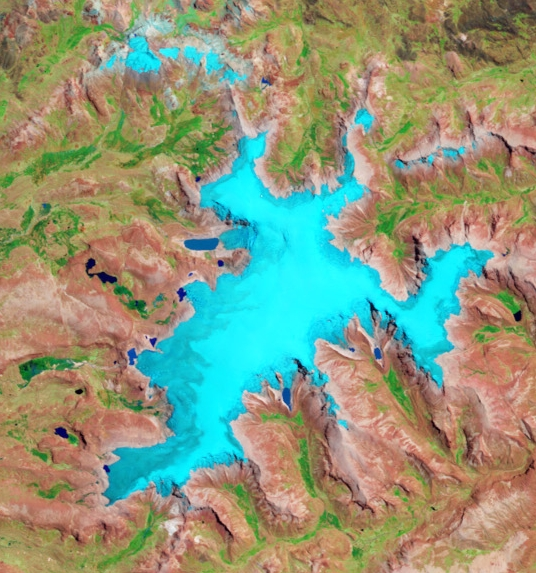
- The glaciated Quelccaya area with Millo and Unollocsina north of it (NASA, 2010)

Highest point
- Elevation: 5,300 m (17,400 ft)
- Coordinates: 13°51′12″S 70°50′25″W

Geography
- Location within Peru
- Location: Peru, Cusco Region, Puno Region
- Parent range: Andes, Vilcanota

Climbing
- First ascent: Quelccaya

Unollocsina (possibly from Quechua unu, yaku water, lluqsina exit, "water exit") is a mountain in the Vilcanota mountain range in the Andes of Peru, about 5,300 metres (17,388 ft) high. It is located in the Cusco Region, Canchis Province, Checacupe District, and in the Puno Region, Carabaya Province, Corani District. Unollocsina lies north of the glaciated area of Quelccaya (Quechua for "snow plain"), east of Millo.
