= Intijahuana =

Mountain in Peru

- Location within Peru

Highest point
- Elevation: 5,099 m (16,729 ft)
- Coordinates: 13°58′25″S 71°07′22″W

Geography
- Location: Peru, Cusco Region
- Parent range: Andes, Vilcanota

Intijahuana (possibly from Quechua inti sun, qhawana, viewpoint; window, "sun viewpoint") is a 5,099-metre-high (16,729 ft) mountain in the Vilcanota mountain range in the Andes of Peru. It is located in the Cusco Region, Canchis Province, on the border of the districts of Checacupe and Pitumarca. Intijahuana lies north of Huarisallana.
