= Ayamachay =

Archaeological site in Peru

- Interactive map of Ayamachay
- 14°06′14″S 71°26′31″W
- Location: Peru
- Region: Cusco Region, Canchis Province

Ayamachay (possibly from Quechua aya corpse, mach'ay cave) is an archaeological site with rock paintings in Peru. It is situated in the Cusco Region, Canchis Province, Combapata District, above the left bank of the Salqa or Salcca river near the village of Oroscocha or Oroscocha. The paintings are predominantly white and show abstract or geometrical figures.

West of Ayamach'ay there is another site with rock art named Llamachayuq Qaqa.
