= Qusqu Qhawarina =

Mountain in Peru

- Location within Peru

Highest point
- Elevation: 5,217.9 m (17,119 ft)
- Coordinates: 14°2′22″S 71°5′55″W

Geography
- Location: Peru, Cusco Region, Canchis Province
- Parent range: Andes

Qusqu Qhawarina (Quechua qusqu boundary stone; nucleus; navel; heap of earth and stones; bed, dry bed of a lake, Qusqu Cusco (a city), qhawarina, qhawana viewpoint, also spelled Cuzcoccahuarina) is a mountain in the Andes of Peru, about 5,217.9 metres (17,119 ft) high. It is located in the Cusco Region, Canchis Province, Checacupe District. Qusqu Qhawarina lies south of a lake named Waka Quta (or Wak'a Quta, also spelled Huacasccota).
