= Huila Aje (mountain) =

Mountain in Peru

- Location within Peru

Highest point
- Elevation: 5,900 m (19,400 ft)
- Coordinates: 13°47′05″S 70°58′11″W

Geography
- Location: Peru, Cusco Region
- Parent range: Andes, Vilcanota

Climbing
- First ascent: Shayman Gerry and Scott “San Pedro” Light, by the west face. 09 May 2022.

Huila Aje (possibly from Aymara wila blood, blood-red, jaqhi precipice, cliff, "red cliff") is a mountain in the Vilcanota mountain range in the Andes of Peru, about 5,900 m (19,357 ft) high. It is situated in the Cusco Region, Canchis Province, Pitumarca District, and in the Quispicanchi Province, Marcapata District. Huila Aje lies northeast of the lakes named Sibinacocha and Amayuni, between Yayamari and Condoriquiña.
