= Jatunhuma =

Mountain in Peru near Cusco

- Jatunpampa / Pico Tres
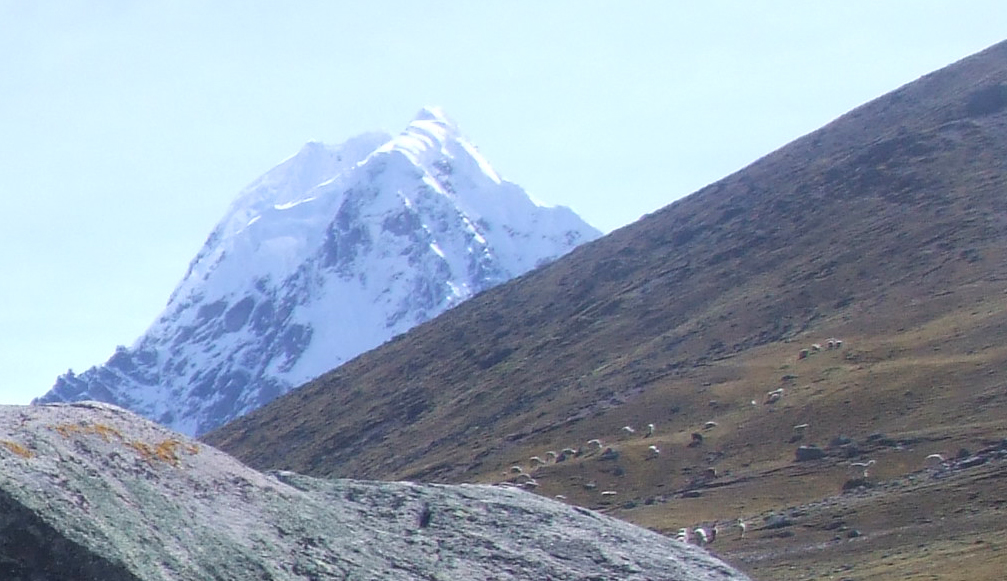
- Jatunhuma in the Cordillera Vilcanota as seen for the west.

Highest point
- Elevation: 6,093 m (19,990 ft)
- Prominence: 726 m (2,382 ft)
- Parent peak: Alcamarinayoc
- Coordinates: 13°44′50″S 71°08′12″W

Geography
- Location within Peru
- Location: Peru, Cusco Region
- Parent range: Andes, Vilcanota

Climbing
- First ascent: Highest peak 07/27/1957 via N.W. ridge by Günther Hauser, Theodore Achilles, Bernhard Kuhn, Wiedmann. W. face: Traverse all 3 peaks S.- N.- Peak 5800m 1966: N.W. face-1977: E. face-1980: W. face-1982.

Jatunhuma (possibly from Quechua hatun big, superior, principal, uma mountain top / head), Jatunpampa (possibly from Quechua pampa plain) or Pico Tres (Spanish for "peak three") is a mountain in the Vilcanota mountain range in the Andes of Peru, about 6,093 metres (19,990 ft) high. It is situated in the Cusco Region, Canchis Province, Pitumarca District, and in the Quispicanchi Province, Ocongate District. Hatunuma lies northwest of the large lake named Sibinacocha and southeast of Callangate.

== First Ascent ==
Jatunhuma was first climbed by Günther Hauser, Theodore Achilles, Bernhard Kuhn and Wiedmann (Germany) 27 July 1957.

== Elevation ==
Other data from available digital elevation models: SRTM 6078 metres, ASTER 6026 metres and TanDEM-X 5969 metres. The height of the nearest key col is 5367 meters, leading to a topographic prominence of 726 meters. Jatunhuma is considered a Mountain Subgroup according to the Dominance System and its dominance is 11.92%. Its parent peak is Alcamarinayoc and the Topographic isolation is 6.8 kilometers.

== See also ==
- Huarurumicocha
