= Chupika =

Mountain in Peru

- Location within Peru

Highest point
- Elevation: 5,061.8 m (16,607 ft)
- Coordinates: 14°2′4″S 71°15′47″W

Geography
- Location: Peru, Cusco Region, Canchis Province
- Parent range: Andes

Chupika (Aymara for "colored", Hispanicized spelling Chupica) is a mountain in the Cusco Region in the Andes of Peru, about 5,061.8 metres (16,607 ft) high. It is situated in the Canchis Province, on the border of the districts Checacupe and Pitumarca.
