= Jach'a Sirk'i =

Mountain in Peru

- Location within Peru

Highest point
- Elevation: 4,800 m (15,700 ft)
- Coordinates: 14°04′56″S 71°03′39″W

Geography
- Location: Peru, Cusco Region
- Parent range: Andes

Jach'a Sirk'i (Aymara jach'a big, sirk'i wart, "big wart", Hispanicized spelling Jachasirque) is a mountain in the Andes of Peru, about 4,800 m (15,700 ft) high. It is located in the Cusco Region, Canchis Province, Checacupe District. Jach'a Sirk'i lies northwest of Wari Sallani.
