= Comercocha (Checacupe) =

Mountain in Peru

- Location within Peru

Highest point
- Elevation: 5,060 m (16,600 ft)
- Coordinates: 14°01′49″S 70°54′59″W

Naming
- Language of name: Quechua

Geography
- Location: Peru, Cusco Region, Canchis Province, Checacupe District
- Parent range: Andes, Vilcanota

Comercocha (possibly from Quechua q'umir green, qucha lake, "green lake") is a 5,060-metre-high (16,601 ft) mountain in the Vilcanota mountain range in the Andes of Peru. It is located in the Cusco Region, Canchis Province, Checacupe District. Comercocha lies southwest of the glaciated area of Quelccaya (Quechua for "snow plain"): It is situated south of the Huancane River near a lake named Soracocha.
