= Joyllor Puñuna =

Mountain in Peru

- Location within Peru

Highest point
- Elevation: 5,743 m (18,842 ft)
- Coordinates: 13°55′44″S 70°49′1″W

Geography
- Location: Peru, Cusco Region, Puno Region
- Parent range: Andes, Vilcanota

Joyllor Puñuna is a mountain in the Vilcanota mountain range in the Andes of Peru, about 5,743 m (18,842 ft) high. It is situated on the border of the regions of Cusco and Puno. Joyllor Puñuna is the highest elevation on the Quelccaya Ice Cap.
