= Istalla =

Mountain in Peru

- Location within Peru

Highest point
- Elevation: 5,400 m (17,700 ft)
- Coordinates: 13°48′23″S 70°54′18″W

Naming
- Language of name: Aymara

Geography
- Location: Peru
- Parent range: Andes, Vilcanota

Istalla (possibly from Quechua for a quadrangular, woven or knitted multi-colored piece of clothing to carry coca leaves) is a mountain in the Andes of Peru, about 5,400 metres (17,717 ft) high, situated in the Vilcanota mountain range south east of Cusco. It is located in the Cusco Region, Canchis Province, Pitumarca District, and in the Quispicanchi Province, Marcapata District. Istalla lies northeast of the mountain Condoriquiña.
