= Llamachayuq Qaqa =

Archaeological site with rock paintings in Peru

- Location: Peru
- Region: Cusco Region, Canchis Province

Site notes
- Height: 3,535 metres (11,598 ft)

Llamachayuq Qaqa (Quechua llama llama, -cha, -yuq suffixes, qaqa rock, "a rock with a little llama"), Wakan Wayq'u or Wakanwayq'u (Waqhan Wayq'o, Waqhanhuayq'o, Waqhanwayq'o) is an archaeological site with rock paintings in Peru. It is situated in the Cusco Region, Canchis Province, Combapata District. The site with paintings of llamas lies in a valley named Wakanwayq'u at a height of about 3,535 metres (11,598 ft).

East of Llamachayuq Qaqa there is another site with rock art named Ayamach'ay.
