= Cóndor Sallani =

Mountain in Peru

- Location within Peru

Highest point
- Elevation: 5,102 m (16,739 ft)
- Coordinates: 14°04′45″S 70°56′55″W

Geography
- Location: Peru
- Parent range: Andes, Vilcanota

Cóndor Sallani (possibly from Aymara kunturi condor, salla rocks, cliffs, -ni a suffix, "the one with condor cliffs") is a 5,102-metre-high (16,739 ft) mountain in the Vilcanota mountain range in the Andes of Peru. It is situated in the Cusco Region, Canchis Province, Checacupe District.
