= Phatanka =

Mountain in Peru

- Location within Peru

Highest point
- Elevation: 5,200 m (17,100 ft)
- Coordinates: 14°00′32″S 71°09′06″W

Geography
- Location: Peru, Cusco Region
- Parent range: Andes

Phatanka (Aymara for stomach, belly (of animals), hispanicized spellings Patanca, Patanga) is a mountain in the Cusco Region in the Andes of Peru, about 5,200 m (17,100 ft) high. It is situated in the Canchis Province, Checacupe District.
