= Tutallipina =

Mountain in Peru

- Location within Peru

Highest point
- Elevation: 5,200 m (17,100 ft)
- Coordinates: 14°01′59″S 70°51′51″W

Geography
- Location: Peru
- Parent range: Andes, Vilcanota

Tutallipina (possibly from Aymara tutha moth, llipiña to catch birds with a trap) is a mountain in the Vilcanota mountain range in the Andes of Peru, about 5,200 metres (17,060 ft) high. It is situated in the Cusco Region, Canchis Province, Checacupe District, and in the Puno Region, Carabaya Province, Corani District. Tutallipina lies southwest of the mountain Otoroncane and Huancane Apacheta and south of Sayrecucho.
