= Inka Pirqa =

Mountain in Peru

- Location within Peru

Highest point
- Elevation: 5,075 m (16,650 ft)
- Coordinates: 14°07′20″S 71°12′52″W

Geography
- Location: Peru, Cusco Region, Canchis Province
- Parent range: Andes

Inka Pirqa or Inkapirqa (Quechua Inka Inca, pirqa (Kichwa pirka) wall, "Inca wall", Hispanicized spelling Incaperca) is a 5,075-metre-high (16,650 ft) mountain in the Andes of Peru. It is located in the Cusco Region, Canchis Province, on the border of the districts of Combapata and San Pablo.
