= Millo (Cusco) =

Mountain in Peru

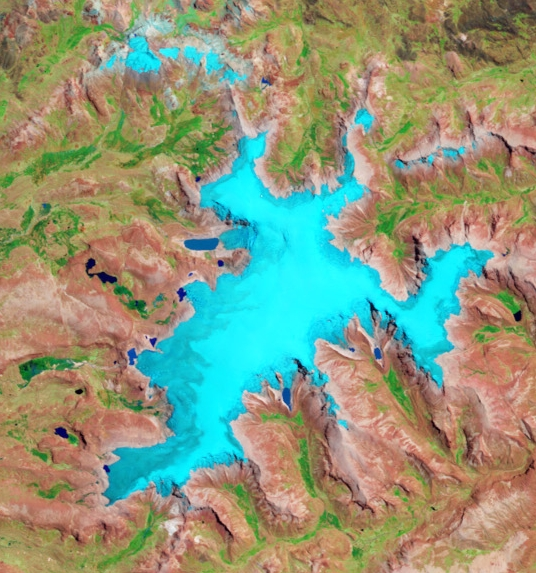
- The glaciated Quelccaya area with Millo shown in the upper left part of this image (NASA, 2010)

Highest point
- Elevation: 5,500 m (18,000 ft)
- Coordinates: 13°51′16″S 70°51′50″W

Geography
- Location within Peru
- Location: Peru, Cusco Region, Puno Region
- Parent range: Andes, Vilcanota

Millo (possibly from Aymara for a kind of salpeter / light brown, reddish, fair-haired, dark chestnut, Quechua for salty,) is a mountain in the Vilcanota mountain range in the Andes of Peru, about 5,500 metres (18,045 ft) high. It is situated in the Cusco Region, Canchis Province, Checacupe District, and in the Puno Region, Carabaya Province, Corani District. Millo lies northwest of the large glaciated area of Quelccaya (Quechua for "snow plain") and west of Unollocsina.
