= Chumpe (Cusco) =

Mountain in Peru

- Jatunriti, Ñanaloma, Yanaloma
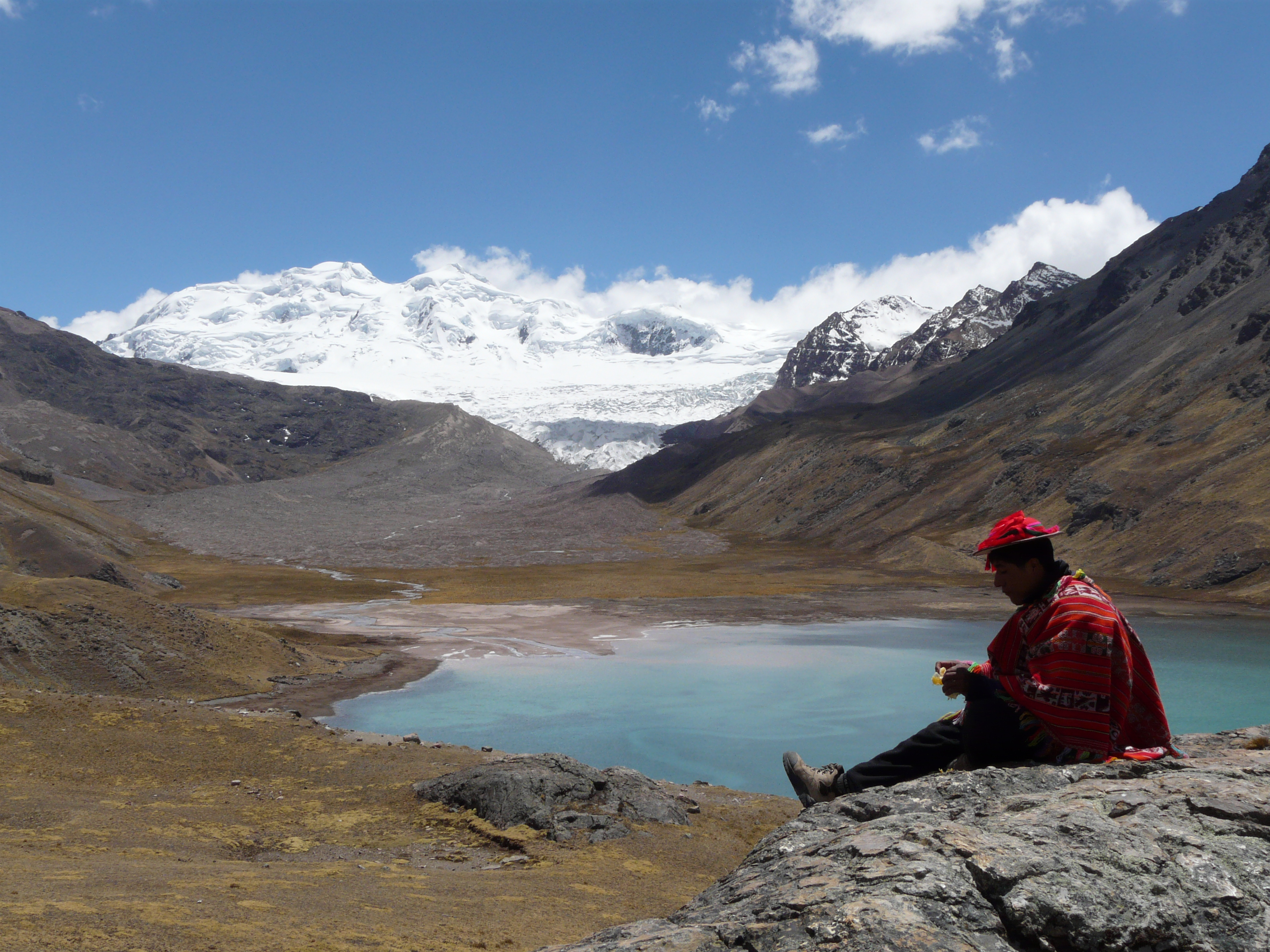
- Chumpe and Lake Sibinacocha

Highest point
- Elevation: 6,106 m (20,033 ft)
- Coordinates: 13°43′32″S 71°04′53″W

Geography
- Location within Peru
- Location: Peru
- Parent range: Andes, Vilcanota

Chumpe (possibly from Quechua chumpi: belt), Jatunriti, Ñanaloma or Yanaloma is a mountain in the Vilcanota mountain range in the Andes of Peru with 6,106 metres (20,033 ft) of elevation. It is located in the Cusco Region, Canchis Province, Pitumarca District as well as in the Quispicanchi Province, Ocongate District. Chumpe lies north of Lake Sibinacocha.

== See also ==
- Aquichua
- Huarurumicocha
