= Chillcamayu =

- Etymology: Quechua

Location
- Country: Peru
- Region: Cusco Region

Physical characteristics
- Mouth: Vilcanota River

Chillcamayu (possibly from Quechua ch'illka baccharis, mayu river, "baccharis river") which upstream is called Jampamayo and downstream Pitumarca is a river in Peru located in the Cusco Region, Canchis Province, in the districts Checacupe and Pitumarca. Its waters flow to the Vilcanota River.

Chillcamayu originates in the Vilcanota mountain range between the mountains Jatunhuma in the north-west and Huayruro Punco in the south-east. It crosses the Pitumarca District from north-east to south-west along the villages of Jampa, Chillca and Pitumarca. One of its main tributaries from the left is Yanamayo (Quechua for "black river"). The confluence with the Vilcanota River is near Checacupe.
