= Cordillera Vilcanota =

Mountain range in Peru

Coordinates: 13°46′S 71°18′W

Vilcanota mountain range
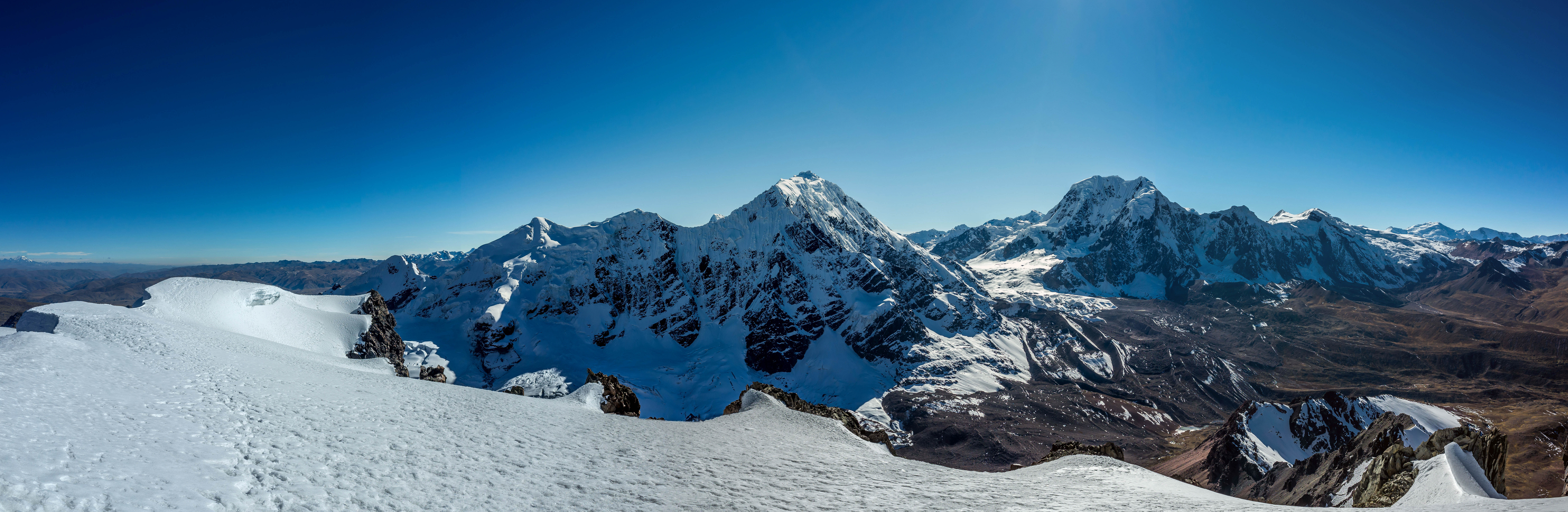
- Cordillera Vilcanota panorama seen from the summit of Qampa I.

Highest point
- Peak: Ausangate
- Elevation: 6,384 m (20,945 ft)

Naming
- Native name: Willkan Uta / Willkanuta (Aymara)

Geography
- Country: Peru
- Region: Cusco Region
- Parent range: Andes

The Cordillera Vilcanota (Spanish cordillera: "mountain range", Aymara: willkan uta "house of the sun") is a mountain range located in Peru southeast of Cusco, on the boundary between the regions of Cusco and Puno. It extends between 13°39' and 14°29'S and 70°31' and 71°20'W for about 80 km. It includes 469 glaciers.

To the east the rivers San Gabán and Azángaro are the natural boundary which separates it from the Carabaya range. The La Raya range near the La Raya pass is sometimes included or listed separately.

== Toponyms ==
Most of the names in the range originate from Quechua and Aymara. They used to be spelled according to a mainly Spanish-based orthography which is incompatible with the normalized spellings of these languages and Law 29735 which regulates the 'use, preservation, development, recovery, promotion and diffusion of the originary languages of Peru'. According to Article 20 of Decreto Supremo No 004-2016-MC (Supreme Decree) which approves the Regulations to Law 29735, published in the official newspaper El Peruano on July 22, 2016, adequate spellings of the toponyms in the normalized alphabets of the indigenous languages must progressively be proposed with the aim of standardizing the namings used by the IGN. The IGN realizes the necessary changes in the official maps of Peru. These changes are part of a process to promote the indigenous languages and to reassert the rights of the indigenous peoples.

Hints to wrong spellings are terms containing hua and hui (instead of wa and wi), "e", "o", "ca", "cu", "qu" or diphthongs among others.

== Mountains ==
The highest mountain in the range is Ausangate which is also the fourth largest mountain in Peru. Other notable peaks including the Ayakachi group, the northern extension of the range, are listed below:

- Callangate, 6,110 metres (20,046 ft)
- Chumpe, 6,106 metres (20,033 ft)
- Alcamarinayoc, 6,102 metres (20,020 ft)
- Jatunhuma, 6,093 metres (19,990 ft)
- Yayamari, 6,049 metres (19,846 ft)
- Huiscachani, 6,000 metres (19,685 ft)
- Huila Aje, 5,900 metres (19,357 ft)
- Japu Punta 5,850 metres (19,193 ft)
- Jatunñaño Punta 5,812 metres (19,068 ft)
- Condoriquiña, 5,780 metres (18,963 ft)
- Joyllor Puñuna, 5,743 metres (18,842 ft)
- Kiru (or Sallqantay), 5,720 metres (18,766 ft)
- Awsanqati, 5,714 metres (18,747 ft)
- Quishuarnioj, 5,700 metres (18,701 ft)
- Quevesere, 5,700 metres (18,701 ft)
- Kisu Q'ipina, 5,650 metres (18,537 ft)
- San Braulio, 5,650 metres (18,537 ft)
- Iskupitani, 5,600 metres (18,373 ft)
- Puca Punta, 5,600 metres (18,373 ft)
- Hualipayoc, 5,600 metres (18,373 ft)
- Jonorana, 5,553 metres (18,219 ft)
- Cóndor Tuco, 5,550 metres (18,209 ft)
- Huayruro Punco, 5,550 metres (18,209 ft)
- Jolljepunco, 5,522 metres (18,117 ft)
- Pomanota, 5,516 metres (18,097 ft)
- Japu Japu, 5,500 metres (18,045 ft)
- Millo, 5,500 metres (18,045 ft)
- Uriyuq, 5,500 metres (18,045 ft)
- Osjollo Anante, 5,500 metres (18,045 ft)
- Yanajaja, 5,500 metres (18,045 ft)
- Cinajara, 5,471 metres (17,949 ft)
- Ayakachi, 5,470 metres (17,946 ft)
- Pantipata, 5,450 metres (17,881 ft)
- Quinsachata, 5,442 metres (17,854 ft)
- Quyllur Rit'i, 5,402 metres (17,723 ft)
- Apu K'uchu, 5,400 metres (17,717 ft)
- Santa Catalina, 5,400 metres (17,717 ft)
- Jatun Quenamari 5,400 metres (17,717 ft)
- Jatuncucho 5,400 metres (17,717 ft)
- Istalla, 5,400 metres (17,717 ft)
- Jarupata, 5,400 metres (17,717 ft)
- Cuncapata 5,400 metres (17,717 ft)
- Cuncunani 5,400 metres (17,717 ft)
- Mullucocha, 5,400 metres (17,717 ft)
- Pucasalla, 5,400 metres (17,717 ft)
- Pajo, 5,400 metres (17,717 ft)
- Ccolcce, 5,400 metres (17,717 ft)
- Comercocha, 5,400 metres (17,717 ft)
- Sacsa Ananta, 5,400 metres (17,717 ft)
- Huasacocha, 5,400 metres (17,717 ft)
- Jatun Alfapata, 5,390 metres (17,684 ft)
- Qillita, 5,386 metres (17,671 ft)
- Waykintani, 5,350 metres (17,552 ft)
- Jachatira, 5,320 metres (17,454 ft)
- Pucacocha, 5,320 metres (17,454 ft)
- Otoroncane, 5,305 metres (17,405 ft)
- Ananta 5,300 metres (17,388 ft)
- Chaupimaquito, 5,300 metres (17,388 ft)
- Chuallani, 5,300 metres (17,388 ft)
- Uchuy Milla, 5,300 metres (17,388 ft)
- Jampatune, 5,300 metres (17,388 ft)
- Aquichua, 5,300 metres (17,388 ft)
- Cunorana, 5,300 metres (17,388 ft)
- Quellhuacota, 5,300 metres (17,388 ft)
- Cochacucho, 5,300 metres (17,388 ft)
- Quehuesiri, 5,300 metres (17,388 ft)
- Sanimayo, 5,300 metres (17,388 ft)
- Sullulluni, 5,300 metres (17,388 ft)
- Surapata, 5,300 metres (17,388 ft)
- Suyuparina, 5,300 metres (17,388 ft)
- Unollocsina, 5,300 metres (17,388 ft)
- Huisahuisa, 5,300 metres (17,388 ft)
- Jupucunca, 5,295 metres (17,372 ft)
- Tocllayoc, 5,291 metres (17,359 ft)
- Culi, 5,290 metres (17,356 ft)
- Minasnioc, 5,248 metres (17,218 ft)
- Huampuni, 5,248 metres (17,218 ft)
- Ananta, 5,200 metres (17,060 ft)
- Chullumpina, 5,200 metres (17,060 ft)
- Hatun Punta, 5,200 metres (17,060 ft)
- Jatun Sallica, 5,200 metres (17,060 ft)
- Inkaqucha, 5,200 metres (17,060 ft)
- Kimsa Chata, 5,200 metres (17,060 ft)
- Kuntur Sayani, 5,200 metres (17,060 ft)
- Llusca Ritti (in Corani), 5,200 metres (17,060 ft)
- Llusca Ritti, 5,200 metres (17,060 ft)
- Macho Ritti, 5,200 metres (17,060 ft)
- Pariyuq, 5,200 metres (17,060 ft)
- Pata Q'ispi Kancha, 5,200 metres (17,060 ft)
- Pichacani, 5,200 metres (17,060 ft)
- Jori Pintay, 5,200 metres (17,060 ft)
- Conatira, 5,200 metres (17,060 ft)
- Catautira, 5,200 metres (17,060 ft)
- Runcu Tauja, 5,200 metres (17,060 ft)
- Sallatira, 5,200 metres (17,060 ft)
- Sambo, 5,200 metres (17,060 ft)
- Sayrecucho, 5,200 metres (17,060 ft)
- Surimani, 5,200 metres (17,060 ft)
- Taruca Sayana, 5,200 metres (17,060 ft)
- Tutallipina, 5,200 metres (17,060 ft)
- Orco Puñuna, 5,200 metres (17,060 ft)
- Othaña, 5,200 metres (17,060 ft)
- Waman Lipani, 5,200 metres (17,060 ft)
- Huamanripayco, 5,200 metres (17,060 ft)
- Huanacune, 5,200 metres (17,060 ft)
- Huancane Apacheta, 5,200 metres (17,060 ft)
- Huarisayana, 5,200 metres (17,060 ft)
- Viluyo, 5,200 metres (17,060 ft)
- Hueco, 5,200 metres (17,060 ft)
- Yanajasa, 5,200 metres (17,060 ft)
- Culipata, 5,172 metres (16,969 ft)
- Pucajasa, 5,165 metres (16,946 ft)
- Cóndor Sallani, 5,102 metres (16,739 ft)
- Ananta Cucho, 5,100 metres (16,732 ft)
- Ancahuachana, 5,100 metres (16,732 ft)
- Ancahuachanan, 5,100 metres (16,732 ft)
- Chachacumani, 5,100 metres (16,732 ft)
- Chachacomayoc, 5,100 metres (16,732 ft)
- Jarjapata, 5,100 metres (16,732 ft)
- Mamanlipani, 5,100 metres (16,732 ft)
- Piyacuyani, 5,100 metres (16,732 ft)
- Quello Cunca, 5,100 metres (16,732 ft)
- Riticocha, 5,100 metres (16,732 ft)
- Sallaqucha, 5,100 metres (16,732 ft)
- Huilacunca, 5,100 metres (16,732 ft)
- Velacota, 5,100 metres (16,732 ft)
- Huillopuncho, 5,100 metres (16,732 ft)
- Yana Orjo, 5,100 metres (16,732 ft)
- Intijahuana, 5,099 metres (16,729 ft)
- Alcamarina, 5,085 metres (16,683 ft)
- Viscachani, 5,065 metres (16,617 ft)
- Sumpiruni, 5,063 metres (16,611 ft)
- Comercocha, 5,060 metres (16,601 ft)
- Quenamari, 5,054 metres (16,581 ft)
- Piscopata, 5,037 metres (16,526 ft)
- Sillajata, 5,037 metres (16,526 ft)
- Yanacocha, 5,025 metres (16,486 ft)
- Chiajarjapata, 5,014 metres (16,450 ft)
- Anta Punco, 5,000 metres (16,404 ft)
- Chachacumani, 5,000 metres (16,404 ft)
- Chojorusi, 5,000 metres (16,404 ft)
- Jatunrritioc, 5,000 metres (16,404 ft)
- Hatun Sallayuq, 5,000 metres (16,404 ft)
- Hatun Tiyana, 5,000 metres (16,404 ft)
- Jatunyurac Caca, 5,000 metres (16,404 ft)
- Illaq Urqu, 5,000 metres (16,404 ft)
- Kuntur Sayana, 5,000 metres (16,404 ft)
- Jairani 5,000 metres (16,404 ft)
- Pata Anjasi, 5,000 metres (16,404 ft)
- Pirhuani, 5,000 metres (16,404 ft)
- Pucachuaña, 5,000 metres (16,404 ft)
- Pisquioc, 5,000 metres (16,404 ft)
- Collpacaja (Puno), 5,000 metres (16,404 ft)
- Collpacaca, 5,000 metres (16,404 ft)
- Colquetauca, 5,000 metres (16,404 ft)
- Quello Sallayoc, 5,000 metres (16,404 ft)
- Quello Huallayoc, 5,000 metres (16,404 ft)
- Q'umirqucha, 5,000 metres (16,404 ft)
- Riti Huasi, 5,000 metres (16,404 ft)
- Salla Huancane, 5,000 metres (16,404 ft)
- Sihuarani, 5,000 metres (16,404 ft)
- Soracucho, 5,000 metres (16,404 ft)
- Tarucani, 5,000 metres (16,404 ft)
- Tocra, 5,000 metres (16,404 ft)
- Ojecunca, 5,000 metres (16,404 ft)
- Huillolluni, 5,000 metres (16,404 ft)
- Yanacucho, 5,000 metres (16,404 ft)
- Yana Sallayoc, 5,000 metres (16,404 ft)
- Yana Urqu, 5,000 metres (16,404 ft)
- Yanaqucha (in Carabaya), 5,000 metres (16,404 ft)
- Yanacocha (Carabaya-Melgar), 5,000 metres (16,404 ft)
- Yuracjasa, 5,000 metres (16,404 ft)
- Yurac Salla, 5,000 metres (16,404 ft)
- Yurac Huayruro, 5,000 metres (16,404 ft)
- Chiaraje (Cusco-Puno), 4,900 metres (16,076 ft)
- Chiaracce (Melgar), 4,900 metres (16,076 ft)
- Puicutuni, 4,900 metres (16,076 ft)
- Queullacocha, 4,900 metres (16,076 ft)
- Jolpajaja, 4,900 metres (16,076 ft)
- Huayruruni, 4,900 metres (16,076 ft)
- Huiscana, 4,900 metres (16,076 ft)
- Chiriunuyoc, 4,800 metres (15,748 ft)
- Hatun Wayq'u, 4,800 metres (15,748 ft)
- Huch'uy Ananta, 4,800 metres (15,748 ft)
- Jaquehuata, 4,800 metres (15,748 ft)
- Condorsenja, 4,800 metres (15,748 ft)
- Pirhuane, 4,800 metres (15,748 ft)
- Pucaparina, 4,800 metres (15,748 ft)
- Jajachaca, 4,800 metres (15,748 ft)
- Queljata, 4,800 metres (15,748 ft)
- Tipajasa, 4,800 metres (15,748 ft)
- Urqu Puñuna, 4,800 metres (15,748 ft)
- Waracha, 4,800 metres (15,748 ft)
- Huayllahuito, 4,800 metres (15,748 ft)
- Vilapata, 4,800 metres (15,748 ft)
- Vilacirca 4,800 metres (15,748 ft)
- Yana Urqu, 4,800 metres (15,748 ft)
- Yana Urqu, 4,800 metres (15,748 ft)
- Yuraq Q'asa, 4,800 metres (15,748 ft)
- Quechajaja, 4,600 metres (15,092 ft)
- Jollpajaja, 4,600 metres (15,092 ft)
- Yuracjaja, 4,600 metres (15,092 ft)

== Lakes ==
Sibinacocha is the largest of about 22 lakes in the range followed by Lake Singrenacocha northwest of it. Other notable lakes are Armaccocha, Jatun Pucacocha, Pucacocha and Huarurumicocha.
