= Condoriquiña (Cusco) =

Mountain in Peru

- Location within Peru

Highest point
- Elevation: 5,780 m (18,960 ft)
- Coordinates: 13°49′31″S 70°54′55″W

Naming
- English translation: Sleeping place of the condor
- Language of name: Aymara

Geography
- Location: Peru
- Parent range: Andes, Vilcanota

Condoriquiña (possibly from Aymara kunturi condor, ikiña to sleep, bed or blanket) is a 5,780-metre-high (18,963 ft) mountain in the Andes of Peru, situated in the Vilcanota mountain range south east of Cusco. It is located in the Cusco Region, Canchis Province, Pitumarca District, and in the Quispicanchi Province, Marcapata District. It lies east of Lake Sibinacocha.

== See also ==
- List of mountains in Peru
- List of mountains in the Andes
