= Urubamba River =

Urubamba River Vilcanota River
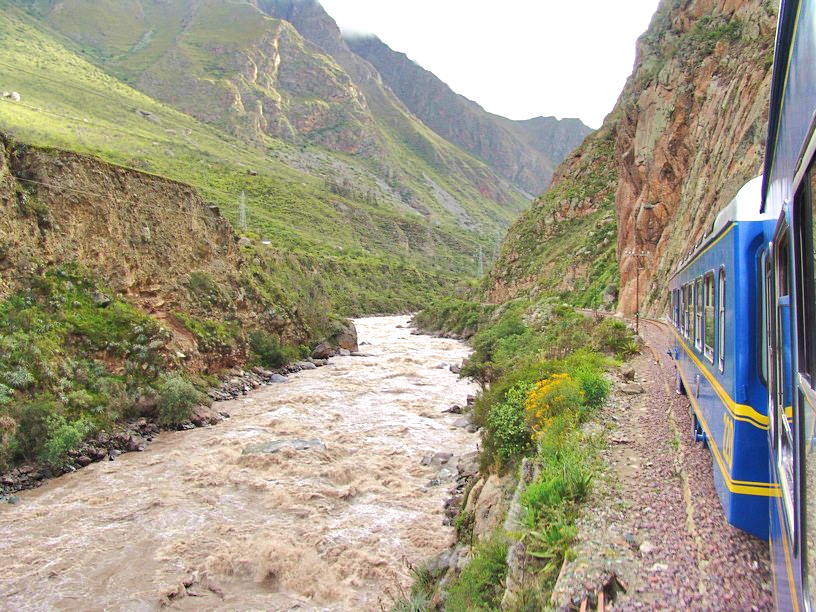
- Urubamba River seen from train en route to Machu Picchu

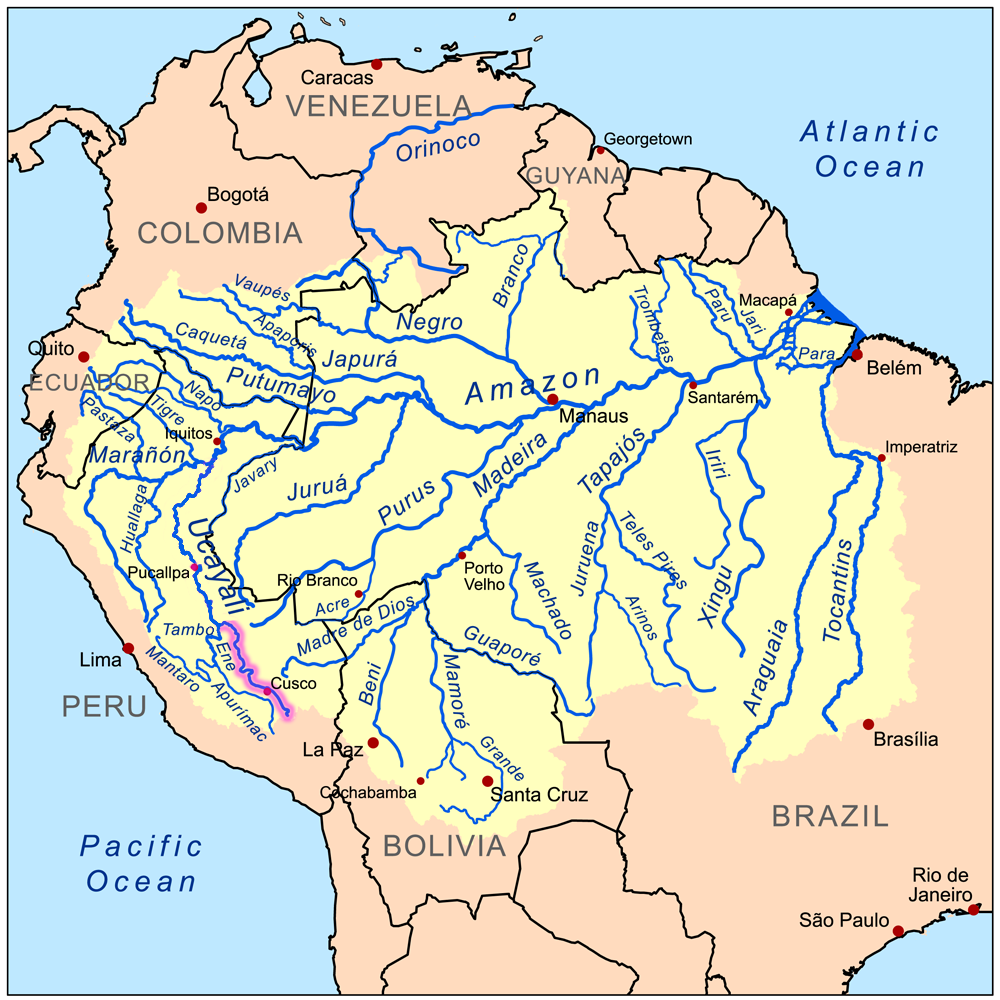
- Urubamba River in the Amazon basin

Location
- Country: Peru

Physical characteristics
- Mouth: Ucayali River
  - coordinates: 10°42′07″S 73°45′15″W
- Length: 724 km (450 mi)

Basin features
- Tributaries
  - left: Lucumayo, Cusichaca, Kachimayu
  - right: Chillcamayu, Yavero

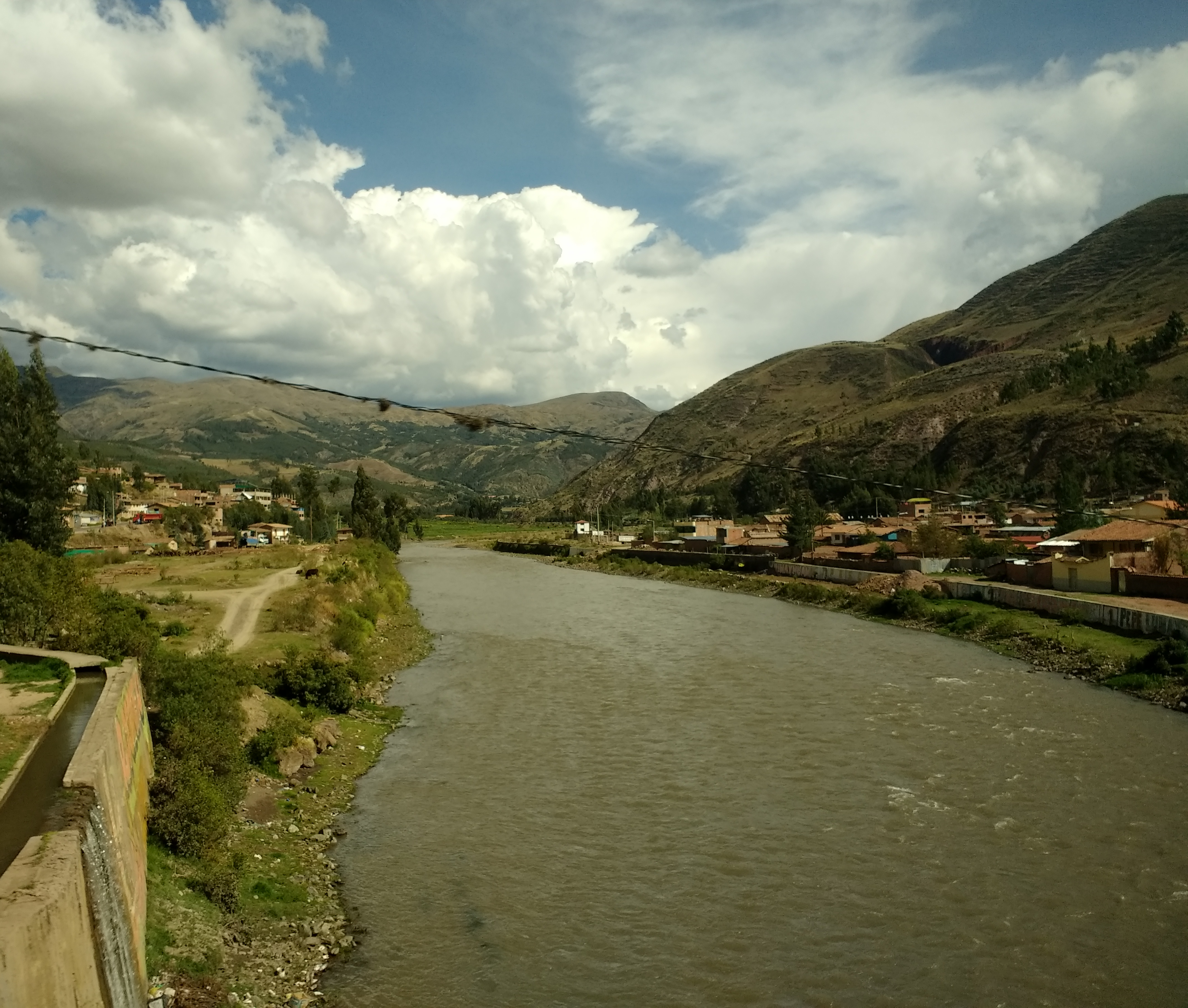
The Urubamba River near Urcos

The Urubamba River or Vilcamayo River (possibly from Quechua Willkamayu, for "sacred river") is a river in Peru. Upstream it is called Vilcanota River (possibly from Aymara Willkanuta, for "house of the sun"). Within the La Convención Province, the name changes to Urubamba. A partially navigable headwater of the Amazon River, the Urubamba rises in the Andes to the southeast of Cusco. It originates on the slopes of Cunurana in the Puno Region, Melgar Province, near the La Raya pass. It flows north-north-west for 724 km (450 mi) before coalescing with the Tambo River to form the Ucayali River.

The Urubamba is divided into the Upper Urubamba and the Lower Urubamba, the dividing feature being the Pongo de Mainique, an infamous whitewater canyon, where the river narrows to a width of 45 metres (148 ft).

== Upper Urubamba ==
The Upper Urubamba (Alto Urubamba) valley features a high population and extensive irrigation works. A number of ruins of the Inca Empire lie in the Sacred Valley, including the Incan city of Machu Picchu, Patallaqta, Pikillaqta and Raqch'i. The Salcca-Pucara hydroelectric project is associated with the river as well. On July 9 of 1897 steamship Adolfito sank while traversing the Upper Urubamba, the notorious Peruvian rubber baron Carlos Fitzcarrald and his Bolivian business partner Antonio de Vaca Díez drowned during this incident.

== Lower Urubamba ==
The Lower Urubamba (Bajo Urubamba) is relatively undeveloped and features a significant indigenous population consisting of the Campa tribes, principally the Machiguenga (Matsigenka) and Asháninka. The economy is based on forestry and the nearby Camisea Gas Project. The main settlement in the region is the town of Sepahua. (Sepahua River coordinates are 11°08′58″S 73°02′55″W.)

=== 1934 first mapping ===
The lower Urubamba River was mapped for the first time in 1934 by Edward Kellog Strong III. He and two friends from Palo Alto, California, Art Post and Gain Allan John, navigated the river with its ferocious rapids by canoe and balsa rafts provided by the indigenous people. The mapping was done at the request of the Peruvian military when they heard of the expedition planned by the three 18-year-olds. The map was turned over to the military when the boys arrived in Iquitos. It remained the only map of the river until mapping by satellite became possible many years later. The names and places on the latest map came from the original map drawn by Edward Strong.

John Walter Gregory, a British geologist, drowned in the river on 2 June 1932, while on a geological expedition to the Andes.

=== Tributaries ===
- Yukay
- Pampacchuana
- Aobamba
- Ste. Teresa or Salcantay
- Sacsara
- Lucumayo
- Vilcabamba
- Chawpimayu
- Pampaconas
- San Miguel
- Comportayoc
- Concevidayoc
- Cosireni

== See also ==
- Sacred Valley
