= Lake Sibinacocha =

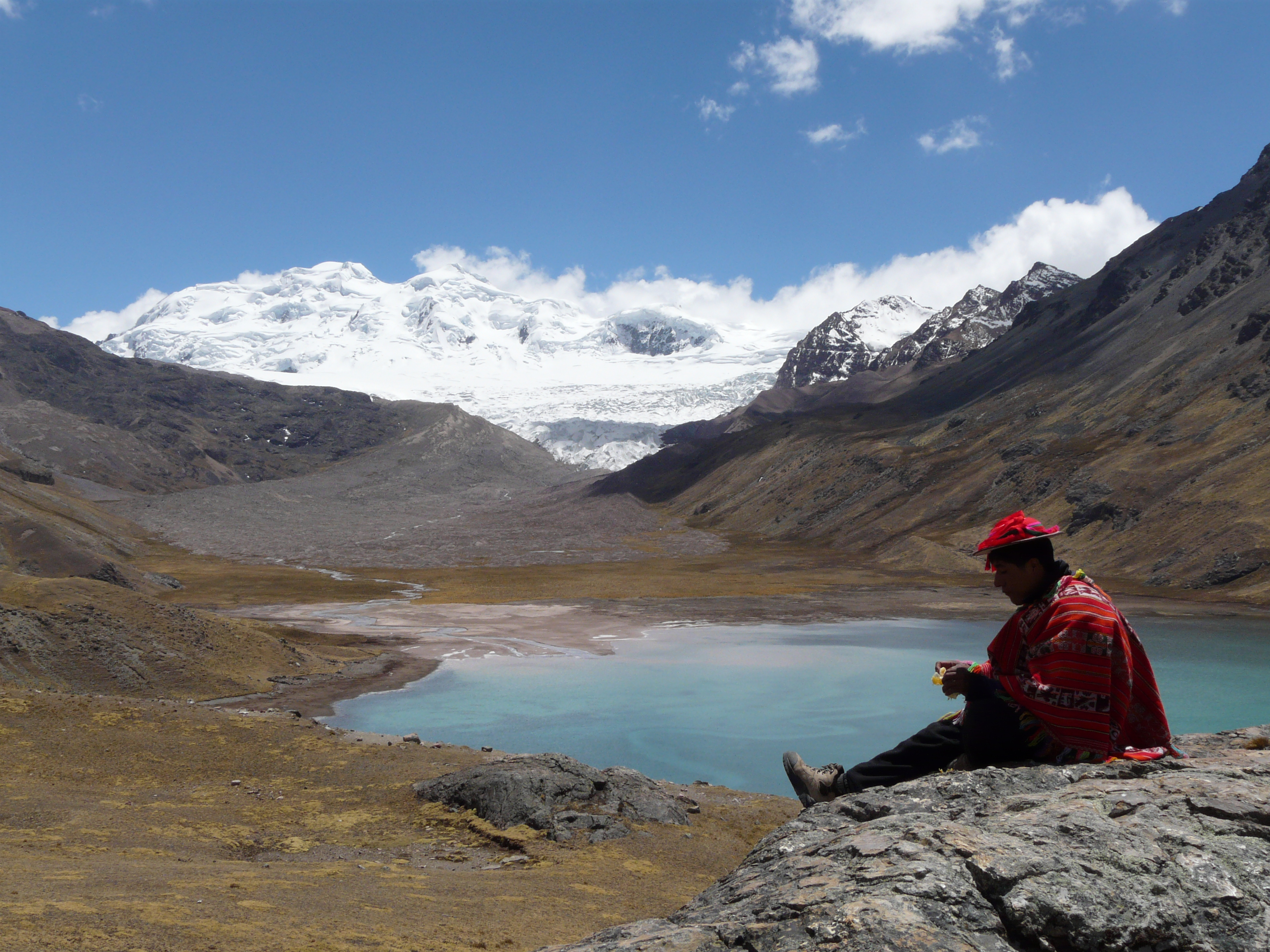
- Lake Sibinacocha with Chumpe in the background

- Location within Peru
- Location: Cusco Region
- Coordinates: 13°51′24″S 71°01′30″W
- Basin countries: Peru
- Max. length: 15.19 km (9.44 mi)
- Max. width: 2.86 km (1.78 mi)
- Surface elevation: 4,873 m (15,988 ft)
- Website: The Sibinacocha Watershed Project

Sibinacocha Dam
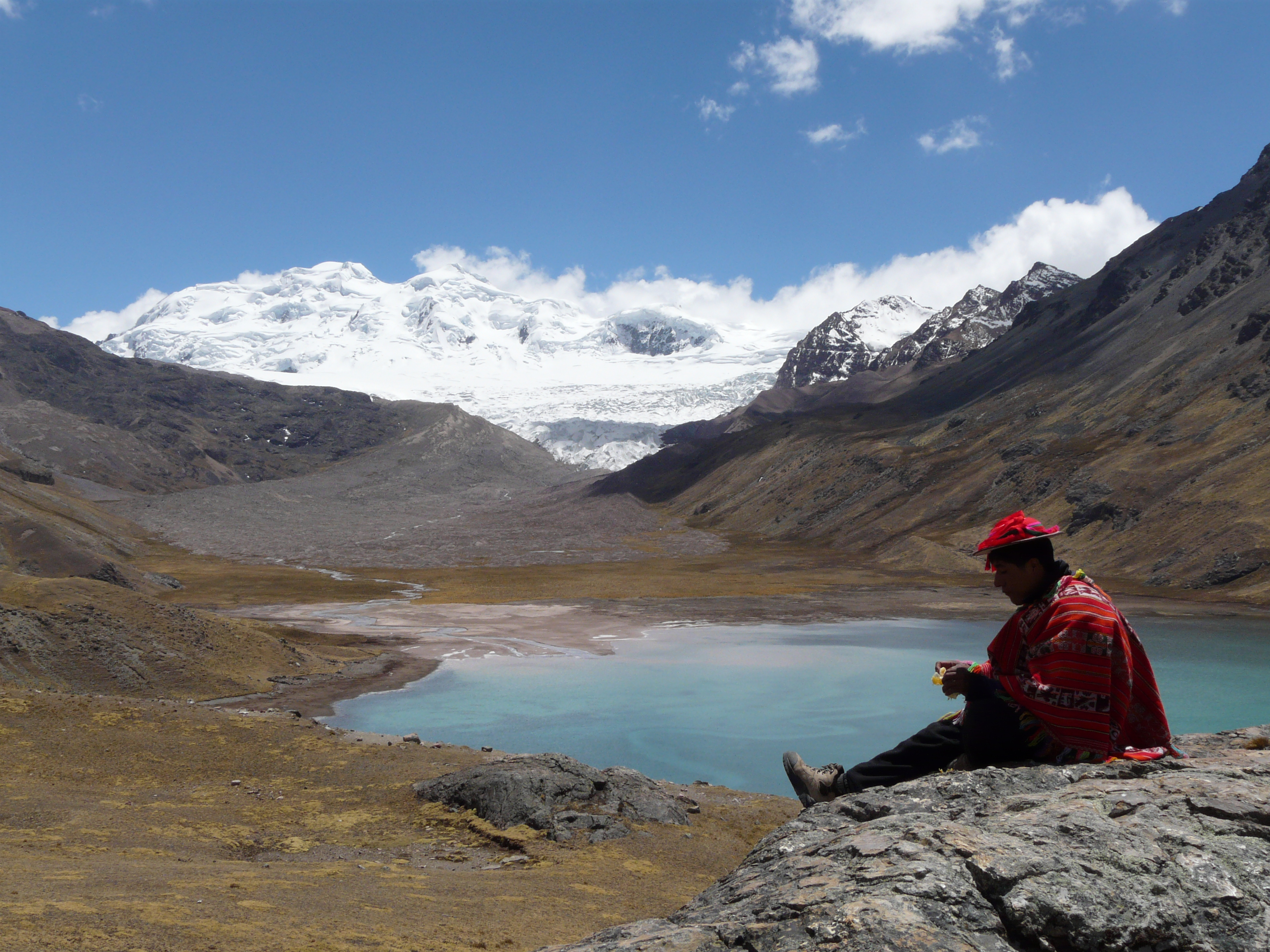

- Location within Peru
- Opening date: 1996

Dam and spillways
- Type of dam: Earthen dam
- Height: 12 m (39 ft)
- Length: 357 m (1,171 ft)

Reservoir
- Total capacity: 110,000,000 m^{3} (89,000 acre⋅ft)

Power Station
- Operator: EGEMSA
- Website; Represa de Sibinacocha

Lake Sibinacocha (possibly from Quechua siwina whistle, qucha lake, lagoon) is a lake in Peru. It is ranked as the 22nd highest lake in the world. It is located in the Cusco Region, Canchis Province, Pitumarca District. The lake is situated at a height of approximately 4,873 metres (15,988 ft), about 15.19 km long and 2.86 km at its widest point, and drains into the Amazon River. Sibinacocha lies in the Vilcanota Range, south of Chumpe and southwest of Condoriquiña. All five 6000m peaks of the Vilcanota Range are visible from the lake shore; in the other direction, the Quelccaya Ice Cap is visible and -further in the distance- the glaciated Jonorana massif, specifically the peaks of Pomanota and Pomanota Norte.

The lake contains Inca artifacts, some of which have been recovered from the lake. Sacred sites around the lake have been studied as possible locations of the lost Ausangate temple. The area has been studied for its importance to the greater Urubamba-Vilcanota watershed. A high-altitude diver, Geoffrey Belter, died in 2014 while exploring the lake.

An earthen dam was erected at the lake in 1996. It is 357 m (1,171 ft) long and 12 m (39 ft) high. The reservoir has a volume of 50,000 m^{3} (41 acre⋅ft) and a capacity of 110,000,000 m^{3} (89,000 acre⋅ft). It is operated by EGEMSA.

== See also ==
- Lake Singrenacocha
- List of lakes in Peru
