= Piyacuyani =

Mountain in Peru

- Location within Peru

Highest point
- Elevation: 5,100 m (16,700 ft)
- Coordinates: 14°06′03″S 70°47′04″W

Geography
- Location: Peru, Puno Region
- Parent range: Andes, Vilcanota

Piyacuyani (possibly from Aymara p'iya hole, qhuya the hole for the seed; mine or hole from which metal is taken, -ni a suffix to indicate ownership) is a mountain in the Vilcanota mountain range in the Andes of Peru, about 5,100 metres (16,732 ft) high. The mountain is located in the Puno Region, Melgar Province, Nuñoa District. Piyacuyani lies southwest of Jonorana, west of Jarupata, north of Huisahuisa, northeast of Jatun Sallica and Jochajucho, and southeast of Jampatune, Pomanota and Jatuncucho. It is situated west of Llankamayu, a right tributary of Hatun Mayu.
