= Huisahuisa =

Mountain in Peru

- Location within Peru

Highest point
- Elevation: 5,300 m (17,400 ft)
- Coordinates: 14°07′04″S 70°47′17″W

Geography
- Location: Peru, Puno Region, Melgar Province
- Parent range: Andes, Vilcanota

Huisahuisa (possibly from Aymara wisa first born twin, Quechua wiksa, wisa belly, the reduplication indicates that there is a group or a complex of something) is a mountain in the Vilcanota mountain range in the Andes of Peru, about 5,300 metres (17,388 ft) high. It is located in the Puno Region, Melgar Province, Nuñoa District. Huisahuisa lies south of Pomanota, Jatuncucho and Piyacuyani, northwest of Conatira, northeast of Hueco and Jatun Sallica and east of Cochacucho. Llancamayo, a right tributary of Jatun Mayo, flows along its eastern slope.
