= Waman Ch'arpa (Abancay-Grau) =

Mountain in Peru

- Location within Peru

Highest point
- Elevation: 4,600 m (15,100 ft)
- Coordinates: 13°55′21″S 72°44′29″W

Geography
- Location: Peru, Apurímac Region
- Parent range: Andes

Waman Ch'arpa (Quechua waman falcon or variable hawk, ch'arpa gold nugget, Hispanicized spelling Huamancharpa) is a mountain in the Andes of Peru, about 4,600 metres (15,092 ft) high. It is located in the Apurímac Region, Abancay Province, Lambrama District, and in the Grau Province, Curpahuasi District. It lies west of the lakes named Chinaqucha and Urququcha.
