= Sillajata =

Mountain in Peru

- Location within Peru

Highest point
- Elevation: 5,037 m (16,526 ft)
- Coordinates: 14°11′03″S 70°41′24″W

Geography
- Location: Peru, Puno Region, Melgar Province
- Parent range: Andes, Vilcanota

Sillajata (possibly from Quechua silla gravel, qhata slope, "gravel slope") is a 5,037-metre-high (16,526 ft) mountain in the Vilcanota mountain range in the Andes of Peru. It is situated in the Puno Region, Melgar Province, Nuñoa District. It lies south of Jonorana and southeast of Salla Huancane.
