= Macari District =

Coordinates: 14.7726°S 70.9118°W

Macari
- District
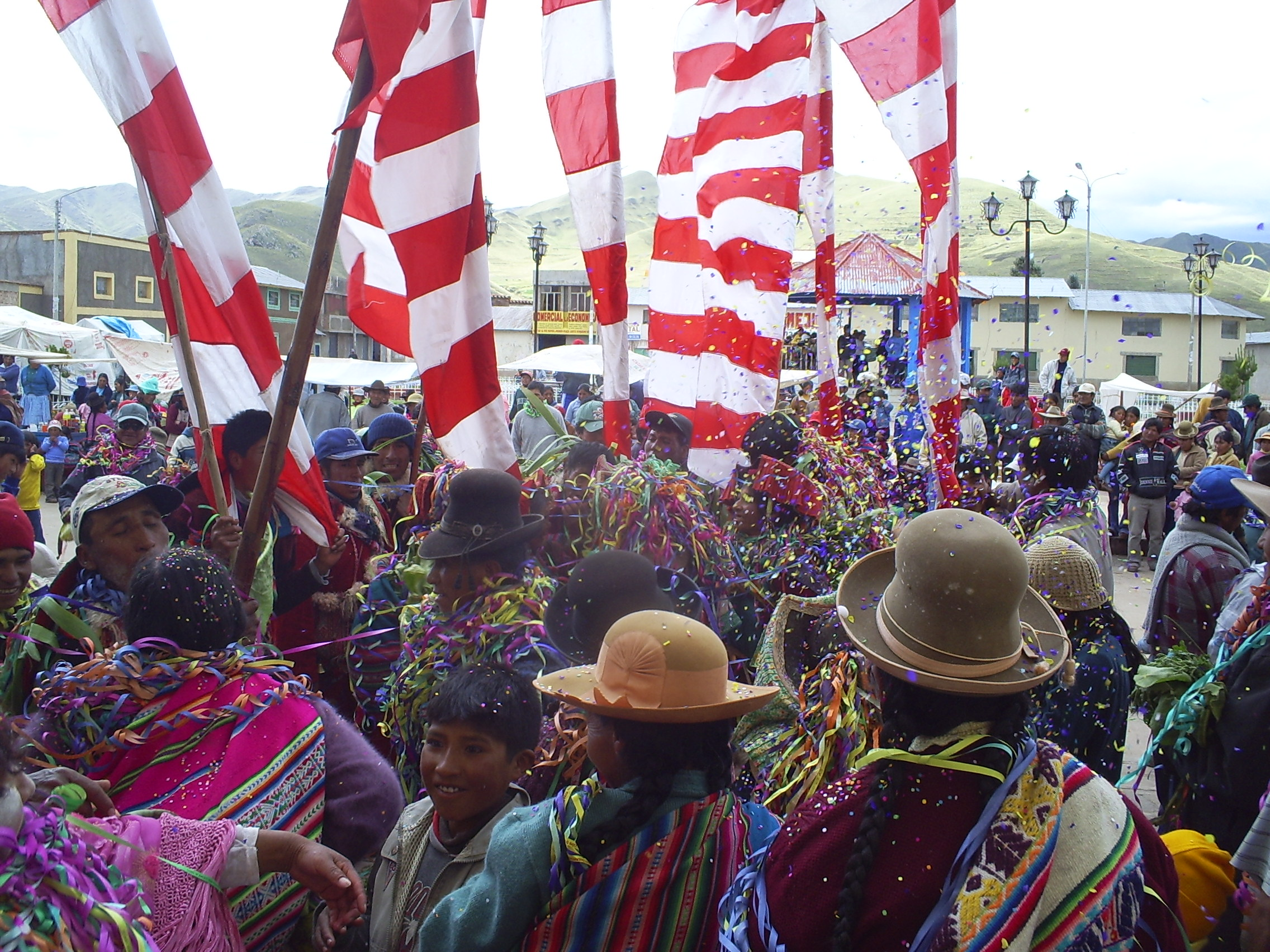
- Carnival in Macari
- Interactive map of Macari
- Country: Peru
- Region: Puno
- Province: Melgar
- Capital: Macari

Government
  - Mayor: Simon Amador Mamani Chañi

Area
  - Total: 673.78 km^{2} (260.15 sq mi)
- Elevation: 3,970 m (13,020 ft)

Population (2005 census)
  - Total: 8,731
  - Density: 12.96/km^{2} (33.56/sq mi)
- Time zone: UTC-5 (PET)
- UBIGEO: 210805

Macari District is one of nine districts of the Melgar Province in Peru. The capital of the district is Macari.

== Limits ==
- North: Layo District
- South: Cupi District
- East: Chuquibambilla
- West: Cusco Department

== Geography ==
One of the highest peaks of the district is Qillqa at 4,900 m (16,100 ft). Other mountains are listed below:

- Apachita
- Aqhuyani
- Chachakumani
- Ch'iqu Rumi
- Hatun Llallawa
- Janq'u Jaqhi
- Kiswarniyuq
- Kuntur Sayana
- Kunturwasa
- Pata Urqu
- Pichaqani
- Puka Apachita
- P'isaq P'unqu
- Qillwa
- Q'illu Qaqa
- Saywani
- Saywanniyuq Urqu
- Surallani
- Tarujani
- Tika Pallana
- Wamanlipani
- Wanqa Sayani
- Waqra Waqra
- Wari Kunka
- Waychu
- Wayna Wachu
- Wila Quta

== Ethnic groups ==
The people in the district are mainly indigenous citizens of Quechua descent. Quechua is the language which the majority of the population (84.25%) learnt to speak in childhood, 15.55% of the residents started speaking using the Spanish language (2007 Peru Census).
