= Chuquibambilla (disambiguation) =

Chuquibambilla may refer to:

- Chuquibambilla, Peru, a town
- Chuquibambilla District, Grau Province, Peru
- Roman Catholic Territorial Prelature of Chuquibambilla
