= Yuraq Q'asa =

Yuraq Q'asa (Quechua yuraq white, q'asa mountain pass, "white mountain pass", Hispanicized spellings Yurac Casa, Yurac Jasa, Yuraj Jassa, Yuraq Kasa, Yuraj Khasa, Yuraccasa, Yuracjasa, Yurajcasa) may refer to:

- Yuraq Q'asa (Arequipa), a mountain in the Arequipa Region, Peru
- Yuraq Q'asa (Bolivia), a mountain in the Potosí Department, Bolivia
- Yuraq Q'asa (Canchis-Quispicanchi), a mountain on the border of the Canchis Province and the Quispicanchi Province, Cusco Region, Peru
- Yuraq Q'asa (Chullupata), a mountain near Chullupata in the Nuñoa District, Melgar Province, Puno Region, Peru
- Yuraq Q'asa (Cochabamba), a mountain in the Cochabamba Department, Bolivia
- Yuraq Q'asa (Espinar), a mountain in the Espinar Province, Cusco Region, Peru
- Yuraq Q'asa (Pumanuta), a mountain near Pumanuta in the Nuñoa District, Melgar Province, Puno Region, Peru
