= Sallatira =

Mountain in Peru

- Location within Peru

Highest point
- Elevation: 5,200 m (17,100 ft)
- Coordinates: 14°10′40″S 70°46′51″W

Geography
- Location: Peru, Puno Region
- Parent range: Andes, Vilcanota

Sallatira (possibly from Aymara salla rocks, cliffs, tira cradle, "rock cradle") is a mountain in the Vilcanota mountain range in the Andes of Peru, about 5,200 metres (17,060 ft) high. It lies in the Puno Region, Melgar Province, Nuñoa District. It is situated between the Siriri valley and the Quenamari valley, east of Surapata.
