= Ch'ulla Rinri =

Mountain in Peru

- Location within Peru

Highest point
- Elevation: 4,950 m (16,240 ft)
- Coordinates: 15°04′57″S 70°42′42″W

Naming
- Language of name: Aymara

Geography
- Location: Peru, Puno Region
- Parent range: Andes

Ch'ulla Rinri (Quechua ch'ulla unequal, rinri ear, "unequal ear", Hispanicized spelling Chullarinri) is a mountain in the Andes of Peru, about 4,950 m (16,240 ft) high. It is located in the Puno Region, Lampa Province, Ocuviri District, and in the Melgar Province, Ayaviri District. Ch'ulla Rinri lies northwest of Achuqallani and north of Warmi Sayana.

The P'allqamayu originates southeast of the mountain. It flows to the north.
