= Quellhuacota (mountain) =

Mountain in Peru

- Location within Peru

Highest point
- Elevation: 5,300 m (17,400 ft)
- Coordinates: 14°09′08″S 70°51′00″W

Geography
- Location: Peru, Cusco Region, Puno Region
- Parent range: Andes, Vilcanota

Quellhuacota (possibly from Aymara qillwa, qiwña, qiwlla Andean gull, quta lake, "gull lake") is a mountain in the Vilcanota mountain range in the Andes of Peru, about 5,300 metres (17,388 ft) high. It is located in the Cusco Region, Canchis Province, San Pablo District, and in the Puno Region, Melgar Province, Nuñoa District. It is situated southwest of the mountains Jochajucho, Jatun Sallica and Wiqu, and northeast of the mountain Sampu.
