= Pucachuaña =

Mountain in Peru

- Location within Peru

Highest point
- Elevation: 5,000 m (16,000 ft)
- Coordinates: 14°11′37″S 70°34′48″W

Geography
- Location: Peru, Puno Region
- Parent range: Andes, Vilcanota

Pucachuaña (possibly from Aymara puka colored, ch'uwaña oozing of water and other liquids; melting of metals and other things) is a mountain in the Vilcanota mountain range in the Andes of Peru, about 5,000 metres (16,404 ft) high. It is situated in the Puno Region, Melgar Province, Nuñoa District. It lies west of Yuracjasa.
