= Chiaraje (Cusco-Puno) =

Mountain in Peru

- Location within Peru

Highest point
- Elevation: 4,900 m (16,100 ft)
- Coordinates: 14°14′58″S 70°53′15″W

Geography
- Location: Peru, Cusco Region, Puno Region
- Parent range: Andes, Vilcanota

Chiaraje (possibly from Aymara ch'iyara black, jaqhi precipice, cliff, "black cliff") is a mountain in the Vilcanota mountain range in the Andes of Peru, about 4,900 metres (16,076 ft) high. It is situated in the Cusco Region, Canchis Province, Sicuani District, and in the Puno Region, Melgar Province, Nuñoa District. Chiaraje lies south-west of the mountain Sambo and north-west of the mountain Chiaracce of the Nuñoa District.
