= Grau province =

Coordinates: 14°06′50″S 72°42′54″W

Grau
- Province
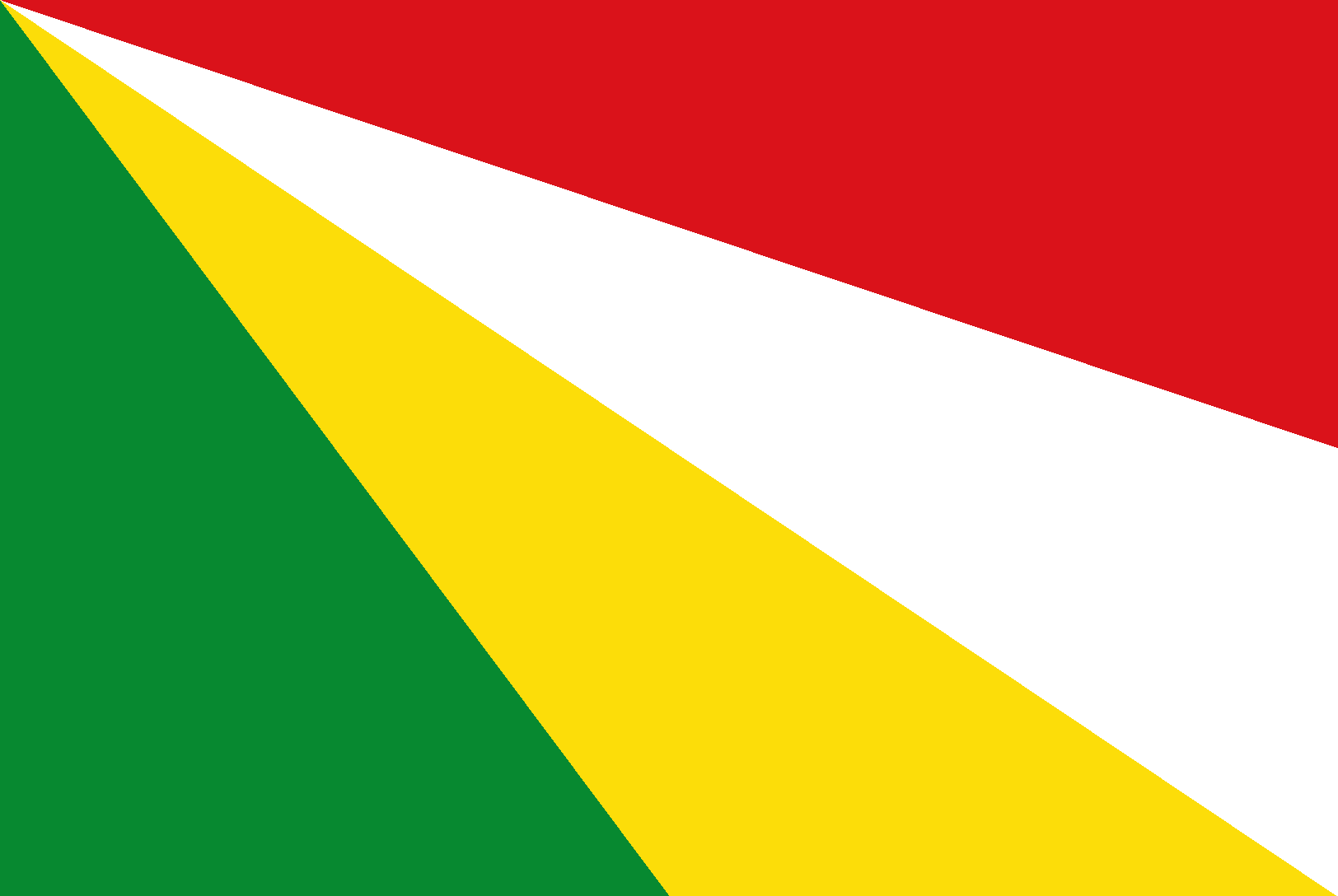
- Flag

- Location of Grau in the Apurímac Region
- Country: Peru
- Region: Apurímac
- Capital: Chuquibambilla

Area
  - Total: 2,174.52 km^{2} (839.59 sq mi)

Population
  - Total: 27,574
  - Density: 12.680/km^{2} (32.842/sq mi)
- UBIGEO: 0307

Grau is one of the seven provinces of the Apurímac Region in Peru. The capital of the province is the city of Chuquibambilla.

The province was named after the naval officer Miguel Grau Seminario.

== Boundaries ==
- North: province of Abancay
- East: province of Cotabambas
- South: province of Antabamba
- West: province of Abancay

== Geography ==
One of the highest peaks of the district is Q'urawiri at approximately 5,000 m (16,000 ft). Other mountains are listed below:

- Allqa Q'awa
- Alma Pampa
- Amayani
- Anta Marka
- Aqu Qucha
- Aqu Q'asa
- Asiru Pata
- Awkirana
- Challa Q'asa
- Chunta Q'asa
- Ch'uspi
- Hatun Qaqa
- Ikma
- Intikancha
- Kachi Kutana
- Kawsu
- Kimsaqucha
- Kuta Wasi
- Llamayuq Rumi
- Misa Pata
- Pampa Urqu
- Parqa Urqu
- Pinqulluni
- Puka Qaqa
- Pukara
- Puma Wasi
- Qiwllanka
- Qutani
- Q'ara Pata
- Q'illu
- Q'illu Q'asa
- Q'illuni
- Rumi Urqu
- Saywit'u
- Surani
- Suwa Qullu
- Taya Q'asa
- Tika Pallana
- Uywaki
- Waman Ch'arpa
- Waman Marka
- Waqutu
- Wayunkani
- Wik'uña Kunka
- Winq'u Pata
- Yana Urqu
- Yawriwiri

== Political division ==
The province measures 2,174.52 square kilometres (839.59 sq mi) and is divided into fourteen districts:

- Chuquibambilla
- Curasco
- Curpahuasi
- Huayllati
- Mamara
- Mariscal Gamarra
- Micaela Bastidas
- Pataypampa
- Progreso
- San Antonio
- Santa Rosa
- Turpay
- Vilcabamba
- Virundo

== Ethnic groups ==
The people in the province are mainly indigenous citizens of Quechua descent. Quechua is the language which the majority of the population (81.28%) learnt to speak in childhood, 18.17% of the residents started speaking using the Spanish language and 0.22% using Aymara (2007 Peru Census).

== See also ==
- Ccotancaire
- Ccullco
- Chinaqucha
- Intikancha
- Kimsaqucha
- Q'urawiri
- Tipiqucha
- Urququcha
