= Vilapata =

Mountain in Peru

- Location within Peru

Highest point
- Elevation: 4,800 m (15,700 ft)
- Coordinates: 14°15′07″S 70°49′45″W

Geography
- Location: Peru, Puno Region
- Parent range: Andes, Vilcanota

Vilapata (possibly from Aymara wila blood, blood-red, pata step, stone bench, "red step") is a mountain in the Vilcanota mountain range in the Andes of Peru, about 4,800 metres (15,748 ft) high. It lies in the Puno Region, Melgar Province, Nuñoa District. It is situated at the Quenamari valley, northeast of Chiaracce.
