= Qillqa =

Qillqa (Quechua for graphic sign, writing (the act and art of writing), Hispanicized spellings Quilca, Quillca, Quellca) may refer to:

- Qillqa (Apurímac), a mountain in the Apurímac Region, Peru
- Qillqa (Cusco), a mountain in the Cusco Region, Peru
- Qillqa (Lampa), a mountain in the Lampa Province, Puno Region, Peru
- Qillqa (Melgar), a mountain in the Melgar Province, Puno Region, Peru
- Quilca District, a district in the Arequipa Region, Peru, whose seat is named Quilca

== See also ==
- Qillqatani
