= Hueco (mountain) =

Mountain in Peru

- Location within Peru

Highest point
- Elevation: 5,200 m (17,100 ft)
- Coordinates: 14°07′48″S 70°48′55″W

Geography
- Location: Peru, Cusco Region, Puno Region
- Parent range: Andes, Vilcanota

Hueco (possibly from Aymara for a corner in a house, a mountain cove) is a mountain in the Vilcanota mountain range Andes of Peru, about 5,200 metres (17,060 ft) high. It is located in the Cusco Region, Canchis Province, San Pablo District, and in the Puno Region, Melgar Province, Nuñoa District. Hueco is situated southwest of Pomanota, Jatuncucho, Cochacucho and Jatun Sallica, and northeast of Quellhuacota.
