= Huillopuncho =

Mountain in Peru

- Location within Peru

Highest point
- Elevation: 5,100 m (16,700 ft)
- Coordinates: 14°12′34″S 70°49′14″W

Geography
- Location: Peru, Puno Region
- Parent range: Andes, Vilcanota

Huillopuncho (possibly from Aymara willu (edible) cane of maize, punchu poncho) is a mountain in the Vilcanota mountain range in the Andes of Peru, about 5,100 metres (16,732 ft) high. It lies in the Puno Region, Melgar Province, Nuñoa District. It is situated south of Surapata and southeast of Sambo.
