= Jatunyurac Caca =

Mountain in Peru

- Location within Peru

Highest point
- Elevation: 5,000 m (16,000 ft)
- Coordinates: 14°12′32″S 70°38′48″W

Geography
- Location: Peru, Puno Region
- Parent range: Andes, Vilcanota

Jatunyurac Caca (possibly from Quechua hatun big, yuraq white, qaqa rock, "big white rock") is a mountain in the southern extensions of the Vilcanota mountain range in the Andes of Peru, about 5,000 metres (16,404 ft) high. It is situated in the Puno Region, Melgar Province, Nuñoa District. Jatunyurac Caca lies southwest of the mountain Collpacaja, east of Yaretani and north of a lower mountain named Yuracgaga.
