= Kuntur Pata =

Mountain in Peru

- Location within Peru

Highest point
- Elevation: 5,107 m (16,755 ft)
- Coordinates: 14°19′48″S 70°28′11″W

Geography
- Location: Peru, Puno Region
- Parent range: Andes

Kuntur Pata (Quechua kuntur condor, pata step, bank of a river, "condor step" or "condor bank", Hispanicized spelling Condorpata, Cóndorpata) is a 5,107-metre-high (16,755 ft) mountain in the Andes of Peru. It is located in the Puno Region, Melgar Province, on the border of the districts of Antauta and Nuñoa. Kuntur Pata lies north of Pirwani. The Pirwani River originates near the mountain. It is a right tributary of the Crucero River whose waters flow to Lake Titicaca.
