= Conatira =

Mountain in Peru

- Location within Peru

Highest point
- Elevation: 5,200 m (17,100 ft)
- Coordinates: 14°07′18″S 70°45′02″W

Geography
- Location: Peru, Puno Region, Melgar Province
- Parent range: Andes, Vilcanota

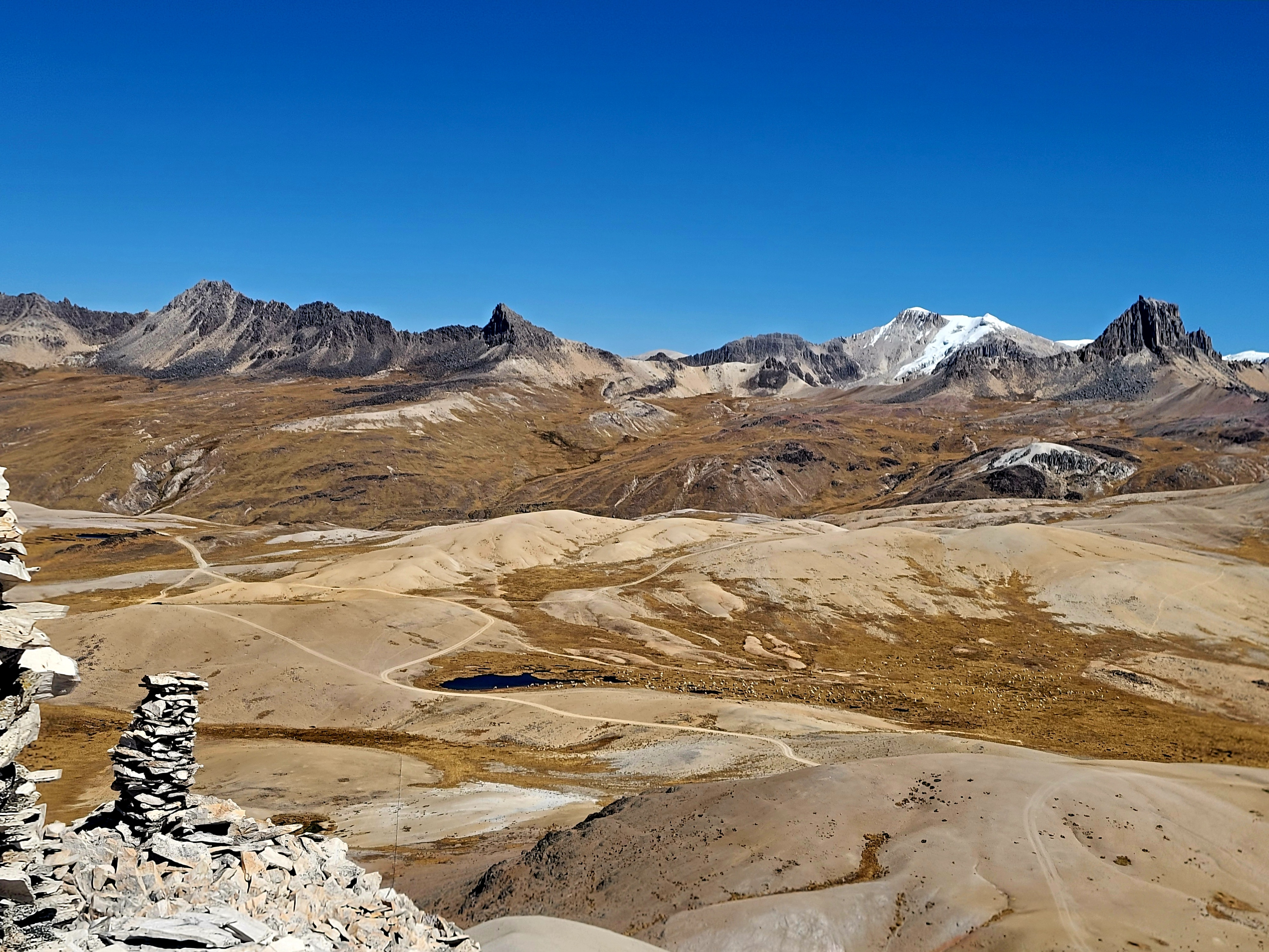
The mountains immediately north of Conatira (left to right): Jarupata, Sachapata, Jonorana (glaciated, in the background), and Quellma. The white spots to the left and right of Quellma are Pumanota and Pumanota Norte, respectively.

Conatira (possibly from Aymara qhuna grind stone, tira cradle, "grind stone cradle") is a mountain in the Vilcanota mountain range in the Andes of Peru, about 5,200 metres (17,060 ft) high . It is situated in the Puno Region, Melgar Province, Nuñoa District. It lies southeast of the summit of Jonorana and southwest of Sachapata and Jarupata. The rivers Llancamayo and Jatun Mayo (Quenamari) which originate north and northeast of Conatira flow along its western, southern and eastern slopes.

The first reported ascent of Conatira on Aug 5 2026 (and of Sachapata on Aug 06 2026) was done by a team composed of Ulli Bayer (USA) and Jackie and Andrew Thorburn (USA), led by John Biggar (of Andes.org.uk); however, both peaks are assumed to have been previously climbed by locals, with large elaborate cairns below the summit of Conatira (and a small shrine below the summit block of Sachapata).

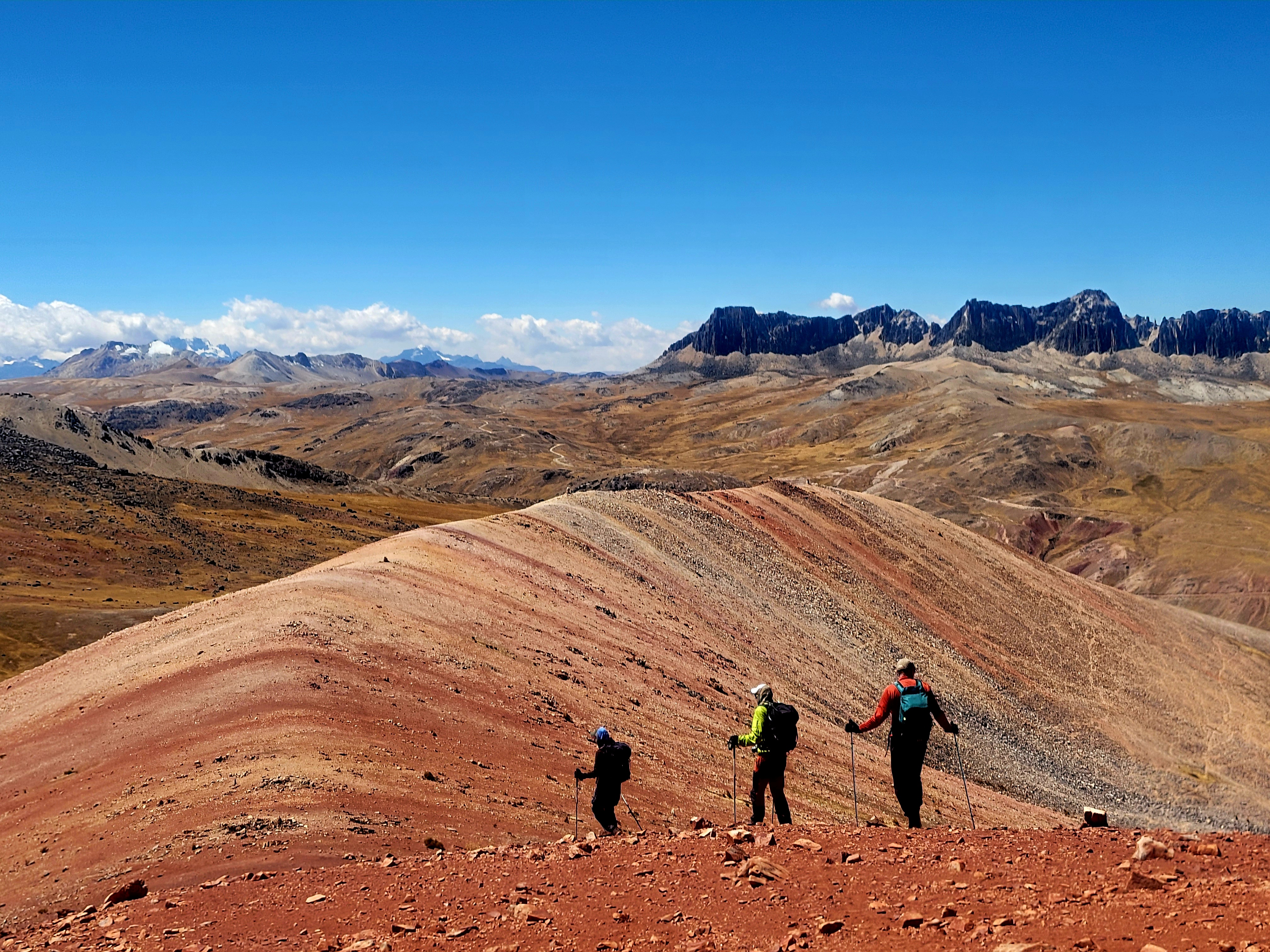
On the descent from Conatira, looking towards the northeast.
