= Janq'u Q'awa (Melgar) =

Mountain in Peru

- Location within Peru

Highest point
- Elevation: 4,435.1 m (14,551 ft)
- Coordinates: 14°39′22″S 70°32′22″W

Geography
- Location: Peru, Puno Region, Melgar Province
- Parent range: Andes

Janq'u Q'awa (Aymara janq'u white, q'awa little river, ditch, crevice, fissure, gap in the earth, "white brook" or "white ravine", Hispanicized spelling Ancoccahua) is a mountain in the Andes of Peru, about 4,435.1 metres (14,551 ft) high. It is situated in the Puno Region, Melgar Province, Orurillo District. Janq'u Q'awa lies southeast of the La Raya mountain range at the lake Janq'uquta, northwest of it.
