= Mariscal Gamarra District =

Coordinates: 13.870°S 72.504°W

Mariscal Gamarra
- District
- Interactive map of Mariscal Gamarra
- Country: Peru
- Region: Apurímac
- Province: Grau
- Founded: December 11, 1942
- Capital: Palpacachi

Government
  - Mayor: Francisco Sequeiros Peña

Area
  - Total: 370.45 km^{2} (143.03 sq mi)
- Elevation: 3,445 m (11,302 ft)

Population (2005 census)
  - Total: 4,253
  - Density: 11.48/km^{2} (29.73/sq mi)
- Time zone: UTC-5 (PET)
- UBIGEO: 030703

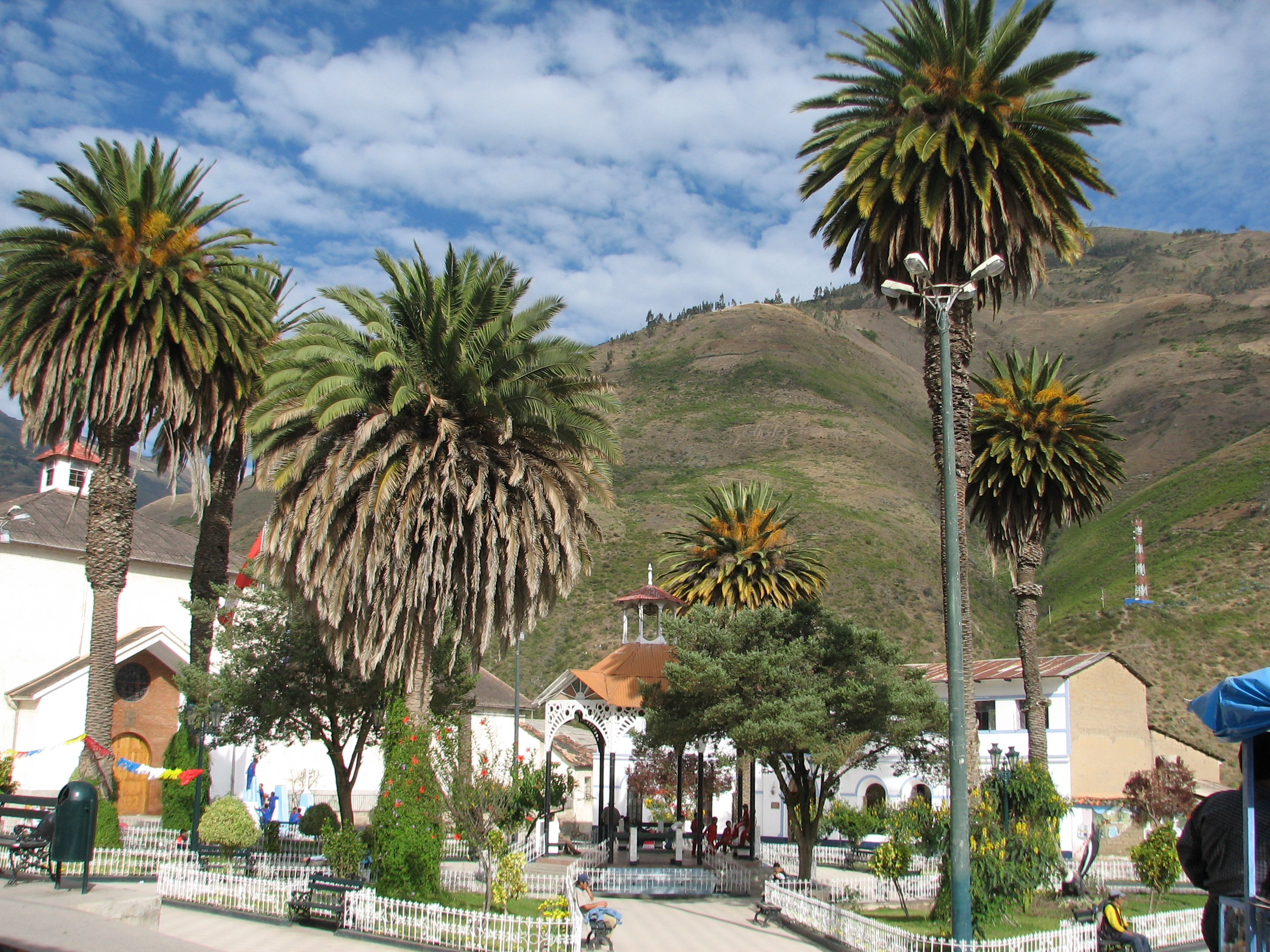

Mariscal Gamarra District is one of the fourteen districts of the Grau Province in Peru.

== Geography ==
One of the highest peaks of the district is Q'illu Q'asa at approximately 4,600 m (15,100 ft). Other mountains are listed below:

- Alma Pampa
- Anta Marka
- Aqu Q'asa
- Asiru Pata
- Awkirana
- Challa Q'asa
- Chunta Q'asa
- Ch'uspi
- Hatun Qaqa
- Kawsu
- Llamayuq Rumi
- Misa Pata
- Parqa Urqu
- Qutani
- Q'illuni
- Saywit'u
- Surani
- Suwa Qullu
- Taya Q'asa
- Tika Pallana
- Uywaki
- Waman Marka
- Waqutu
- Wik'uña Kunka

== Ethnic groups ==
The people in the district are mainly indigenous citizens of Quechua descent. Quechua is the language which the majority of the population (91.90%) learnt to speak in childhood, 7.40% of the residents started speaking using the Spanish language (2007 Peru Census).
