= T'aqañawi =

Mountain in Peru

- Location within Peru

Highest point
- Elevation: 4,380.9 m (14,373 ft)
- Coordinates: 14°55′57″S 70°41′51″W

Naming
- Language of name: Quechua

Geography
- Location: Peru, Puno Region
- Parent range: Andes

T'aqañawi or T'aqa Ñawi (Quechua t'aqa separation, a group of separated things of the same kind, ñawi eye, "separated eye", Hispanicized names Tacañahui, Toccañahui, Tocañahui) is a mountain in the Andes of Peru, about 4,380.9 metres (14,373 ft) high. It is situated in the Puno Region, Melgar Province, in the districts Ayaviri and Umachiri. T'aqañawi lies near Ayaviri at a plain called Pampa T'aqañawi (Pampa Tacañahui).
