= Ayaviri District, Melgar =

Coordinates: 14°52′55″S 70°35′24″W

Ayaviri Ayawiri
- District
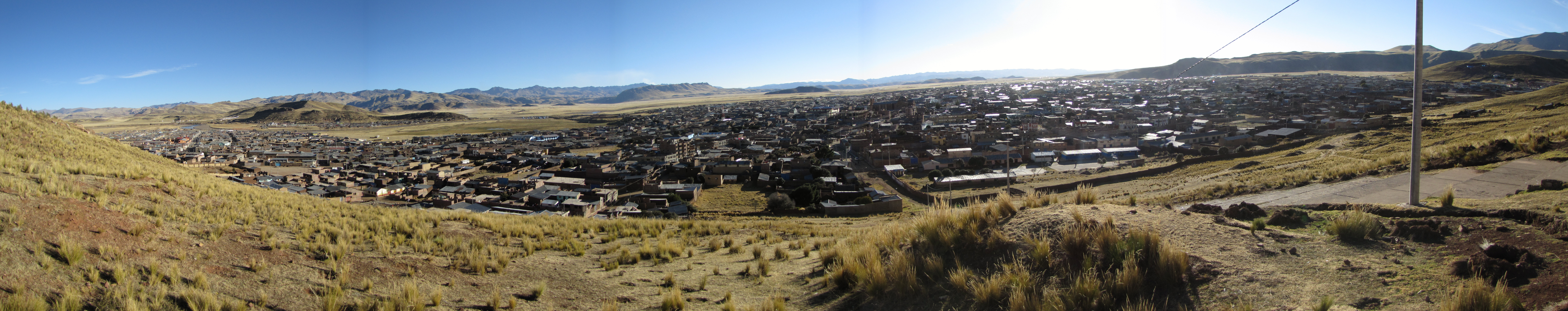
- Ayaviri
- Interactive map of Ayaviri
- Country: Peru
- Region: Puno
- Province: Melgar
- Capital: Ayaviri

Government
  - Mayor: Bernardo Natividad Meza Alvarez

Area
  - Total: 1,013.14 km^{2} (391.18 sq mi)
- Elevation: 3,907 m (12,818 ft)

Population (2005 census)
  - Total: 25,346
  - Density: 25.017/km^{2} (64.794/sq mi)
- Time zone: UTC-5 (PET)
- UBIGEO: 210801

Ayaviri or Ayawiri (Aymara) is one of nine districts of the province Melgar in Peru.

== Geography ==
Some of the highest mountains of the district are listed below:

- Achuqallani
- Chata
- Ch'ulla Rinri
- Kiswarani
- Llallawa
- Llanquni
- Pukarani
- T'ant'ani
- T'aqañawi
- Wallatani
- Wisa Wisa
- Yana Urqu

== Climate ==
Climate data for Ayaviri, elevation 3,941 m (12,930 ft), (1991–2020)
Month	Jan	Feb	Mar	Apr	May	Jun	Jul	Aug	Sep	Oct	Nov	Dec	Year
Mean daily maximum °C (°F)	16.3 (61.3)	16.3 (61.3)	16.4 (61.5)	16.8 (62.2)	17.0 (62.6)	16.3 (61.3)	16.3 (61.3)	17.4 (63.3)	18.6 (65.5)	18.7 (65.7)	19.0 (66.2)	17.8 (64.0)	17.2 (63.0)
Mean daily minimum °C (°F)	3.8 (38.8)	3.8 (38.8)	3.1 (37.6)	0.9 (33.6)	−3.5 (25.7)	−6.3 (20.7)	−6.4 (20.5)	−4.6 (23.7)	−1.0 (30.2)	1.0 (33.8)	2.0 (35.6)	3.2 (37.8)	−0.3 (31.4)
Average precipitation mm (inches)	135.5 (5.33)	123.5 (4.86)	102.3 (4.03)	40.1 (1.58)	7.2 (0.28)	3.3 (0.13)	2.7 (0.11)	6.9 (0.27)	13.6 (0.54)	45.8 (1.80)	60.1 (2.37)	89.8 (3.54)	630.8 (24.84)
Source: National Meteorology and Hydrology Service of Peru
