= Janq'uquta (Puno) =

Lake in Peru

- Location within Peru
- Location: Puno Region
- Coordinates: 14°40′15″S 70°29′08″W
- Basin countries: Peru
- Max. length: 2.34 km (1.45 mi)
- Max. width: 1.21 km (0.75 mi)
- Surface elevation: 3,909 m (12,825 ft)

Janq'uquta or Janq'u Quta (Aymara janq'u white, quta lake, "white lake", hispanicized spellings Janccoccota, Janjojota, Janjoqota) is a lake in Peru located in the Puno Region, Melgar Province, Orurillo District. It is situated at a height of about 3,909 metres (12,825 ft), about 2.34 km long and 1.21 km at its widest point. Janq'uquta lies between the La Raya mountain range in the north-west and Lake Titicaca in the south-east at the mountain Janq'u Q'awa.

== See also ==
- List of lakes in Peru
