= Salla Huancane =

Mountain in Peru

- Location within Peru

Highest point
- Elevation: 5,000 m (16,000 ft)
- Coordinates: 14°09′33″S 70°42′44″W

Geography
- Location: Peru, Puno Region, Melgar Province
- Parent range: Andes, Vilcanota

Salla Huancane (possibly from Aymara salla rocks, cliffs, wanqa a big stone, -ni a suffix) is a mountain in the Vilcanota mountain range in the Andes of Peru, about 5,000 metres (16,404 ft) high . It is situated in the Puno Region, Melgar Province, Nuñoa District. It lies southeast of Jonorana.
