= Sicuani District =

Coordinates: 14.2700°S 71.2316°W

Sicuani Sikuwani
- District
- Interactive map of Sicuani
- Country: Peru
- Region: Cusco
- Province: Canchis
- Capital: Sicuani

Government
  - Mayor: Jorge Quispe Ccallo (2019 - 2022)

Area
  - Total: 645.88 km^{2} (249.38 sq mi)
- Elevation: 3,554 m (11,660 ft)

Population (2005 census)
  - Total: 57,457
  - Density: 88.959/km^{2} (230.40/sq mi)
- Time zone: UTC-5 (PET)
- UBIGEO: 080601

Sicuani District is one of eight districts of the province Canchis in Peru.

== Geography ==
The most important river is the Willkanuta which crosses the district from southeast to northwest.

Some of the highest mountains of the district are listed below:

- Akklani
- Awqar Utt'ana
- China Pukara
- Ch'iyar Jaqhi
- Hatun Awqara
- Hatun Sayri
- Huch'uy Awqara
- Japu Kunka
- Kuntur Puñuna
- Kuntur Sallana
- K'uchu Wasi
- Layra Apachita
- Mulluq’usi
- Paqu Pampa
- Pikchu
- Pirqata
- Pukara
- Phaqcha
- Qawiñani
- Qullqa
- Qhilla Quta
- Qhupu Kunka
- Q'atawi Punta
- Sayk’u Pata
- Sayri
- Takuni
- Urqu Puñuna
- Wila Kunka
- Willkan
- Willk'i
- Yawri Kunka

== Climate ==
Climate data for Sicuani, elevation 3,534 m (11,594 ft), (1991–2020)
Month	Jan	Feb	Mar	Apr	May	Jun	Jul	Aug	Sep	Oct	Nov	Dec	Year
Mean daily maximum °C (°F)	18.8 (65.8)	18.7 (65.7)	19.1 (66.4)	19.5 (67.1)	19.5 (67.1)	19.1 (66.4)	18.9 (66.0)	20.0 (68.0)	20.8 (69.4)	20.8 (69.4)	21.0 (69.8)	19.7 (67.5)	19.7 (67.4)
Mean daily minimum °C (°F)	6.2 (43.2)	6.2 (43.2)	5.7 (42.3)	3.5 (38.3)	−0.6 (30.9)	−3.2 (26.2)	−3.5 (25.7)	−1.6 (29.1)	1.7 (35.1)	3.9 (39.0)	4.6 (40.3)	5.5 (41.9)	2.4 (36.3)
Average precipitation mm (inches)	135.6 (5.34)	140.2 (5.52)	109.6 (4.31)	51.2 (2.02)	10.5 (0.41)	2.4 (0.09)	3.9 (0.15)	6.4 (0.25)	17.7 (0.70)	53.0 (2.09)	75.2 (2.96)	106.4 (4.19)	712.1 (28.03)
Source: National Meteorology and Hydrology Service of Peru

== See also ==
- Saqaqaniqucha
