= Quenamari =

Mountain in Peru

- Location within Peru

Highest point
- Elevation: 5,294 m (17,369 ft)
- Coordinates: 14°12′22″S 70°18′59″W

Geography
- Location: Peru, Puno Region
- Parent range: Andes, Carabaya

Quenamari, Kenamari or Quinamari (possibly from Aymara or Quechua (a possible spelling) is a 5,294-metre (17,369 ft) high mountain in the Carabaya mountain range in the Andes of Peru. It is located in the Puno Region, Carabaya Province, Antauta District, and in the Melgar Province, Ajoyani District, southeast of Macusani. Its western peak (San Bartolomé de Quenamari) with the San Rafael mine lies in the Carabaya Province and the eastern peak (San Francisco de Quenamari) with the Quenamari mine is situated on the border of the provinces. The Quenamari mine in the southeast of the mountain belongs to the Melgar Province.
