= Umachiri District =

Coordinates: 14.8532°S 70.7548°W

Umachiri
- District
- Interactive map of Umachiri
- Country: Peru
- Region: Puno
- Province: Melgar
- Capital: Umachiri

Area
  - Total: 323.56 km^{2} (124.93 sq mi)
- Elevation: 3,904 m (12,808 ft)

Population (2005 census)
  - Total: 4,592
  - Density: 14.19/km^{2} (36.76/sq mi)
- Time zone: UTC-5 (PET)
- UBIGEO: 210809

Umachiri District is one of nine districts of the province Melgar in Peru.

== Ethnic groups ==
The people in the district are mainly indigenous citizens of Quechua descent. Quechua is the language that the majority of the population (67.01%) learned to speak in childhood, while 32.55% of the residents started speaking Spanish (2007 Peru Census).

== Climate ==
Climate data for Chuquibambilla, elevation 3,918 m (12,854 ft), (1991–2020)
Month	Jan	Feb	Mar	Apr	May	Jun	Jul	Aug	Sep	Oct	Nov	Dec	Year
Mean daily maximum °C (°F)	15.3 (59.5)	15.5 (59.9)	15.5 (59.9)	16.1 (61.0)	16.1 (61.0)	15.5 (59.9)	15.3 (59.5)	16.4 (61.5)	17.3 (63.1)	17.6 (63.7)	17.8 (64.0)	16.6 (61.9)	16.3 (61.2)
Mean daily minimum °C (°F)	2.8 (37.0)	3.2 (37.8)	2.6 (36.7)	0.3 (32.5)	−5.4 (22.3)	−8.9 (16.0)	−9.3 (15.3)	−7.4 (18.7)	−3.8 (25.2)	−1.3 (29.7)	−0.2 (31.6)	1.7 (35.1)	−2.1 (28.2)
Average precipitation mm (inches)	157.3 (6.19)	137.4 (5.41)	121.9 (4.80)	51.8 (2.04)	7.1 (0.28)	4.9 (0.19)	3.2 (0.13)	9.5 (0.37)	16.1 (0.63)	48.3 (1.90)	62.6 (2.46)	121.5 (4.78)	741.6 (29.18)
Source: National Meteorology and Hydrology Service of Peru

== See also ==
- T'aqañawi
