= Curasco District =

Coordinates: 14.017°S 72.567°W

Curasco
- District
- Interactive map of Curasco
- Country: Peru
- Region: Apurímac
- Province: Grau
- Founded: October 29, 1993
- Capital: Curasco

Government
  - Mayor: Vidal Edgar Huamani Gutierrez

Area
  - Total: 139.77 km^{2} (53.97 sq mi)
- Elevation: 3,460 m (11,350 ft)

Population (2005 census)
  - Total: 1,742
  - Density: 12.46/km^{2} (32.28/sq mi)
- Time zone: UTC-5 (PET)
- UBIGEO: 030714

Curasco District is one of the fourteen districts of the Grau Province in Peru.

== Geography ==
One of the highest peaks of the district is Malmanya at approximately 5,000 m (16,000 ft). Other mountains are listed below:

- Hatun Q'asa
- Kimsa Kancha
- Puka Urqu
- Puma Wasi
- Phaqcha
- Qucha Kunka
- Q'umir Qucha
- Silla Q'asa
- Sura Urqu
- Usqulluni
- Yana Qalla
- Yana Qaqa

== Ethnic groups ==
The people in the district are mainly indigenous citizens of Quechua descent. Quechua is the language which the majority of the population (93.54%) learnt to speak in childhood, 6.17% of the residents started speaking using the Spanish language (2007 Peru Census).
