= Pataypampa District =

Coordinates: 14.175°S 72.674°W

Pataypampa Patay Pampa
- District
- Interactive map of Pataypampa
- Country: Peru
- Region: Apurímac
- Province: Grau
- Founded: 27 December 1961
- Capital: Pataypampa

Government
  - Mayor: Raul Davila Mejia

Area
  - Total: 158.91 km^{2} (61.36 sq mi)
- Elevation: 3,952 m (12,966 ft)

Population (2005 census)
  - Total: 1,103
  - Density: 6.941/km^{2} (17.98/sq mi)
- Time zone: UTC-5 (PET)
- UBIGEO: 030707

Pataypampa District is one of the fourteen districts of the Grau Province in Peru.

== Geography ==
One of the highest peaks of the district is Qiwlla at approximately 4,800 m (15,700 ft). Other mountains include:

- Amayani
- Ikma
- Kuta Wasi
- Pampa Urqu
- Pinqulluni
- Puka Qaqa
- Qiwllanka
- Q'ara Pata
- Rumi Urqu

== Ethnic groups ==
The people in the district are mainly indigenous citizens of Quechua descent. Quechua is the language which the majority of the population (85.62%) learnt to speak in childhood, and 13.43% of the residents started speaking using the Spanish language (2007 Peru Census).
