= Pirwani (Melgar) =

Mountain in Peru

- Location within Peru

Highest point
- Elevation: 5,000 m (16,000 ft)
- Coordinates: 14°21′07″S 70°28′00″W

Geography
- Location: Peru, Puno Region
- Parent range: Andes

Pirwani (Aymara pirwa, piwra granary, -ni a suffix, "the one with a granary", hispanicized spelling Pirhuani) is a mountain in the Andes of Peru, about 5,000 m (16,000 ft) high. It is located in the Puno Region, Melgar Province, on the border of the districts of Antauta and Nuñoa. Pirwani lies south of Kuntur Pata. The Pirwani River originates near the mountain. It is a right tributary of the Crucero River whose waters flow to Lake Titicaca.
