= Huayllahuito =

Mountain in Peru

- Location within Peru

Highest point
- Elevation: 4,800 m (15,700 ft)
- Coordinates: 14°16′35″S 70°43′01″W

Geography
- Location: Peru, Puno Region
- Parent range: Andes, Vilcanota

Huayllahuito (possibly from Aymara waylla Stipa obtusa, a kind of feather grass, wit'u spur, "feather grass spur") is a mountain in the Vilcanota mountain range in the Andes of Peru, about 4,800 metres (15,748 ft) high. It lies in the Puno Region, Melgar Province, Nuñoa District, southeast of Pucaparina.
