= Llalli District =

Coordinates: 14.9470°S 70.8846°W

Llalli
- District
- Interactive map of Llalli
- Country: Peru
- Region: Puno
- Province: Melgar
- Capital: Llalli

Government
  - Mayor: León Vilca Gamarra

Area
  - Total: 216.36 km^{2} (83.54 sq mi)
- Elevation: 3,980 m (13,060 ft)

Population (2005 census)
  - Total: 4,166
  - Density: 19.25/km^{2} (49.87/sq mi)
- Time zone: UTC-5 (PET)
- UBIGEO: 210804

Llalli District is one of nine districts of the province of Melgar in Peru.

== Ethnic groups ==
The people in the district are mainly indigenous citizens of Quechua descent. Quechua is the language which the majority of the population (80.16%) learned to speak in childhood, while 19.52% of the residents started speaking using the Spanish language (2007 Peru Census).

== Climate ==
Climate data for Llally, elevation 3,985 m (13,074 ft), (1991–2020)
Month	Jan	Feb	Mar	Apr	May	Jun	Jul	Aug	Sep	Oct	Nov	Dec	Year
Mean daily maximum °C (°F)	15.7 (60.3)	15.6 (60.1)	15.8 (60.4)	16.0 (60.8)	16.0 (60.8)	15.5 (59.9)	15.4 (59.7)	16.4 (61.5)	17.6 (63.7)	17.9 (64.2)	18.4 (65.1)	17.0 (62.6)	16.4 (61.6)
Mean daily minimum °C (°F)	3.6 (38.5)	4.0 (39.2)	3.3 (37.9)	1.2 (34.2)	−2.6 (27.3)	−5.1 (22.8)	−5.4 (22.3)	−4.1 (24.6)	−1.4 (29.5)	0.5 (32.9)	1.2 (34.2)	2.8 (37.0)	−0.2 (31.7)
Average precipitation mm (inches)	159.2 (6.27)	154.1 (6.07)	127.0 (5.00)	57.7 (2.27)	8.9 (0.35)	3.3 (0.13)	4.4 (0.17)	6.9 (0.27)	17.2 (0.68)	49.5 (1.95)	56.5 (2.22)	127.9 (5.04)	772.6 (30.42)
Source: National Meteorology and Hydrology Service of Peru
