= Mawk'allaqta, Melgar =

Archaeological site in Peru

Mawk'allaqta
- Interactive map of Mawk'allaqta
- Location: Peru, Puno Region, Melgar Province
- Region: Andes

Mawk'allaqta, also Mawk'a Llaqta (Quechua mawk'a ancient, llaqta place (village, town, city, country, nation), "ancient place", Hispanicized spelling Maucallacta) is an archaeological site in Peru. It is located in the Puno Region, Melgar Province, Nuñoa District. The site was declared a National Cultural Heritage (Patrimonio Cultural) of Peru by the National Institute of Culture.
