= Micaela Bastidas District =

Coordinates: 14.105°S 72.612°W

Micaela Bastidas
- District
- Interactive map of Micaela Bastidas
- Country: Peru
- Region: Apurímac
- Province: Grau
- Founded: December 20, 1957
- Capital: Ayrihuanca

Government
  - Mayor: Teodolfo Pumacayo Quispe

Area
  - Total: 110.14 km^{2} (42.53 sq mi)
- Elevation: 3,508 m (11,509 ft)

Population (2005 census)
  - Total: 1,262
  - Density: 11.46/km^{2} (29.68/sq mi)
- Time zone: UTC-5 (PET)
- UBIGEO: 030706

Micaela Bastidas District is one of the fourteen districts of the Grau Province in Peru.

== Geography ==
One of the highest peaks of the district is Malmanya at approximately 5,000 m (16,000 ft). Other mountains are listed below:

- Inka Pirqa
- Puka Urqu
- Puma Wasi
- Qucha Punta
- Wintanachayuq
- Yana Qaqa
- Yuraq Qaqa

== Ethnic groups ==
The people in the district are mainly indigenous citizens of Quechua descent. Quechua is the language which the majority of the population (94.16%) learn to speak in childhood; 5.32% of the residents learn Spanish as their first language (2007 Peru Census).
