= Asillo District =

Coordinates: 14°47′34″S 70°21′22″W

Asillo
- District
- Interactive map of Asillo
- Country: Peru
- Region: Puno
- Province: Azángaro
- Capital: Asillo

Government
  - Mayor: José Ludgardo Torres Sucari

Area
  - Total: 392.38 km^{2} (151.50 sq mi)
- Elevation: 3,909 m (12,825 ft)

Population (2005 census)
  - Total: 18,725
  - Density: 47.722/km^{2} (123.60/sq mi)
- Time zone: UTC-5 (PET)
- UBIGEO: 210204

Asillo District is one of fifteen districts of the province Azángaro in Peru.

== Ethnic groups ==
The people in the district are mainly indigenous citizens of Quechua descent. Quechua is the language which the majority of the population (81.57%) learnt to speak in childhood, 17.94% of the residents started speaking using the Spanish language (2007 Peru Census).

== Climate ==
Climate data for Progreso, Asillo, elevation 3,925 m (12,877 ft), (1991–2020)
Month	Jan	Feb	Mar	Apr	May	Jun	Jul	Aug	Sep	Oct	Nov	Dec	Year
Mean daily maximum °C (°F)	15.8 (60.4)	15.9 (60.6)	16.1 (61.0)	16.4 (61.5)	16.6 (61.9)	16.0 (60.8)	15.8 (60.4)	16.6 (61.9)	17.3 (63.1)	17.5 (63.5)	17.7 (63.9)	16.7 (62.1)	16.5 (61.8)
Mean daily minimum °C (°F)	4.4 (39.9)	4.4 (39.9)	3.9 (39.0)	2.2 (36.0)	−1.2 (29.8)	−3.4 (25.9)	−3.7 (25.3)	−2.4 (27.7)	0.6 (33.1)	2.5 (36.5)	3.4 (38.1)	4.1 (39.4)	1.2 (34.2)
Average precipitation mm (inches)	127.8 (5.03)	110.8 (4.36)	97.0 (3.82)	43.2 (1.70)	7.8 (0.31)	1.9 (0.07)	3.4 (0.13)	6.8 (0.27)	18.3 (0.72)	48.8 (1.92)	55.2 (2.17)	97.7 (3.85)	618.7 (24.35)
Source: National Meteorology and Hydrology Service of Peru

== See also ==
- Hatun Mayu
