= Lloccesa =

Mountain in Peru

- Location within Peru

Highest point
- Elevation: 5,335 m (17,503 ft)
- Coordinates: 14°08′41″S 70°34′13″W

Geography
- Location: Peru, Puno Region
- Parent range: Andes

Lloccesa (possibly from Aymara) is a 5,335-metre-high (17,503 ft) mountain in the southern extensions of the Vilcanota mountain range in the Andes of Peru. It is situated in the Puno Region, Carabaya Province, Macusani District, and in the Melgar Province, Nuñoa District.
