= Urququcha (Apurímac) =

Lake in Peru

- Location within Peru Location within South America
- Interactive map of Urququcha
- Location: Peru; Apurímac Region, Grau Province
- Coordinates: 13°55′9.5″S 72°43′30.2″W

Urququcha (Quechua urqu male animal; mountain, qucha lake, "male lake", hispanicized spelling Orccococha, Orjococha) is a lake in Peru located in the Apurímac Region, Grau Province, Curpahuasi District. It is situated west of Chinaqucha (Quechua for "female lake"), at the foot of Waman Ch'arpa.
