= Santa Rosa District, Grau =

Coordinates: 14.150°S 72.667°W

Santa Rosa
- District
- Interactive map of Santa Rosa
- Country: Peru
- Region: Apurímac
- Province: Grau
- Founded: June 14, 1990
- Capital: Santa Rosa

Government
  - Mayor: Obispo Roman Chipana

Area
  - Total: 36.16 km^{2} (13.96 sq mi)
- Elevation: 3,550 m (11,650 ft)

Population (2005 census)
  - Total: 767
  - Density: 21.2/km^{2} (54.9/sq mi)
- Time zone: UTC-5 (PET)
- UBIGEO: 030710

Santa Rosa District is one of the fourteen districts of the province Grau in Peru.

== Ethnic groups ==
The people in the district are mainly indigenous citizens of Quechua descent. Quechua is the language which the majority of the population (88.95%) learnt to speak in childhood, 10.75% of the residents started speaking using the Spanish language (2007 Peru Census).
