= Kunturwasa =

Mountain in Peru

- Location within Peru

Highest point
- Elevation: 4,344 m (14,252 ft)
- Coordinates: 14°44′8″S 70°50′28″W

Geography
- Location: Peru, Puno Region, Melgar Province
- Parent range: Andes

Kunturwasa (Quechua kuntur condor, wasa back, "condor back", Hispanicized spelling Condorhuasa) is a mountain in the Andes of Peru, about 4,344 metres (14,252 ft) high. It is situated in the Puno Region, Melgar Province, Macari District, north of a plain called Pampa Tinaya, north-east of Macari.
