= Lambrama District =

Coordinates: 13°52′01″S 72°46′01″W

Lambrama
- District
- Interactive map of Lambrama
- Country: Peru
- Region: Apurímac
- Province: Abancay
- Founded: August 23, 1838
- Capital: Lambrama

Government
  - Mayor: Hilario Saldivar Taipe (2007-2011)

Area
  - Total: 521.62 km^{2} (201.40 sq mi)
- Elevation: 3,111 m (10,207 ft)

Population (2005 census)
  - Total: 3,577
  - Density: 6.857/km^{2} (17.76/sq mi)
- Time zone: UTC-5 (PET)
- UBIGEO: 030106

Lambrama District is one of the nine districts of the Abancay Province in Peru. It is located at 13° 52' 32" latitude (south) and 72° 46' 19" latitude (west)

== Geography ==
One of the highest peaks of the district is Waman Ch'arpa at approximately 4,600 m (15,100 ft). Other mountains are listed below:

- Anta Pampa
- Anta Qucha
- Aqu Q'asa
- Chawpi Urqu
- Ch'aki Urqu
- Ch'illkani
- Ch'uñuna
- Huch'uy Q'asa
- Illa Urqu
- Jajuri
- Janq'u Marka
- Kampanayuq
- Kimsa Qucha
- Kimsa Urqu
- Kiska Urqu
- Kuntur Urqu
- Mawk'a Llaqta
- Minas Pata
- Ñuñu Pampa
- Pampa Q'asa
- Paqu Paqu
- Parqa Urqu
- Pata Pata
- Payrumani
- Pinqulluni
- Qillqa
- Q'illuni
- Q'umir Pata
- Runa Runa
- Silla Q'asa
- Wayunkani
- Wisk'achayuq

== Ethnic groups ==
The people in the district are mainly indigenous citizens of Quechua descent. Quechua is the language which the majority of the population (87.87%) learnt to speak in childhood, 11.95% of the residents started speaking using the Spanish language (2007 Peru Census).
