= Lake Sacacanicocha =

Lake in Peru

- Location within Peru
- Location: Peru; Cusco Region
- Coordinates: 14°13′44″S 71°04′37″W
- Surface elevation: 4,301 m (14,111 ft)

Lake Sacacanicocha (possibly from Aymara saqaqa volcanic exhalation, -ni a suffix, Quechua qucha lake) is a lake in the Cusco Region in Peru. It lies in the Canchis Province, Sicuani District. It is situated at a height of 4,301 m (14,111 ft).
