= Collpacaja (Melgar) =

Mountain in Peru

- Location within Peru

Highest point
- Elevation: 5,000 m (16,000 ft)
- Coordinates: 14°11′07″S 70°38′27″W

Geography
- Location: Peru, Puno Region
- Parent range: Andes, Vilcanota

Collpacaja (possibly from Quechua qullpa salty, salpeter, qaqa rock, "salpeter rock") is a mountain in the southern extension of the Vilcanota mountain range in the Andes of Peru, about 5,000 metres (16,404 ft) high. The mountain is situated in the Puno Region, Melgar Province, Nuñoa District. Collpacaja lies south of the mountain Yanacocha. To the west of Collpacaja is a small lake named Quellhuacocha ("gull lake").
