= Sicuani =

- Town
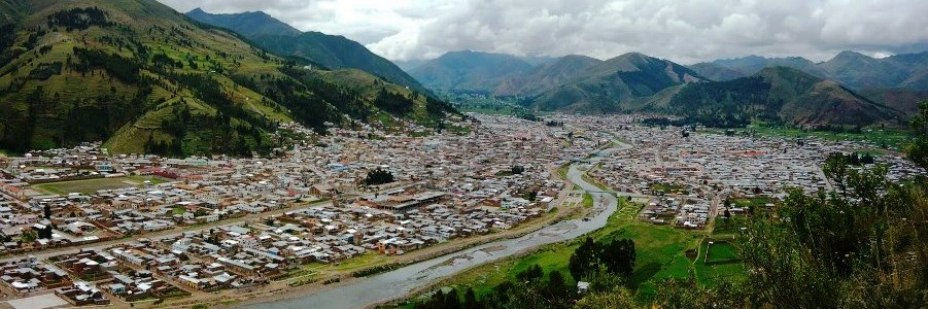

- Location within Peru
- Coordinates: 14.272°S 71.229°W
- Country: Peru
- Region: Cusco
- Province: Canchis
- District: Sicuani

Government
  - Mayor: Jorge Quispe Ccallo
- Time zone: UTC-5 (PET)

Sicuani is a town in southern Peru, capital of Canchis Province in Cusco Region. It has an estimated population of 54,672 inhabitants. One important feature in this town is the Urubamba River. The river was of great importance in the Inca Empire and previous cultures. Downstream, the Urubamba makes its way to the Amazon River.

== Climate ==
Climate data for Sicuani, elevation 3,534 m (11,594 ft), (1991–2020)
Month	Jan	Feb	Mar	Apr	May	Jun	Jul	Aug	Sep	Oct	Nov	Dec	Year
Mean daily maximum °C (°F)	18.8 (65.8)	18.7 (65.7)	19.1 (66.4)	19.5 (67.1)	19.5 (67.1)	19.1 (66.4)	18.9 (66.0)	20.0 (68.0)	20.8 (69.4)	20.8 (69.4)	21.0 (69.8)	19.7 (67.5)	19.7 (67.4)
Mean daily minimum °C (°F)	6.2 (43.2)	6.2 (43.2)	5.7 (42.3)	3.5 (38.3)	−0.6 (30.9)	−3.2 (26.2)	−3.5 (25.7)	−1.6 (29.1)	1.7 (35.1)	3.9 (39.0)	4.6 (40.3)	5.5 (41.9)	2.4 (36.3)
Average precipitation mm (inches)	135.6 (5.34)	140.2 (5.52)	109.6 (4.31)	51.2 (2.02)	10.5 (0.41)	2.4 (0.09)	3.9 (0.15)	6.4 (0.25)	17.7 (0.70)	53.0 (2.09)	75.2 (2.96)	106.4 (4.19)	712.1 (28.03)
Source: National Meteorology and Hydrology Service of Peru

== Tourist attractions ==
- La Iglesia de Pampacucho, Pampacucho's church
- Tupac Amarus stadium
- Thermal baths of Uyrumiri, one hour from Sicuani.
