= Melgar province =

Coordinates: 14.881822°S 70.590061°W

Melgar
- Province
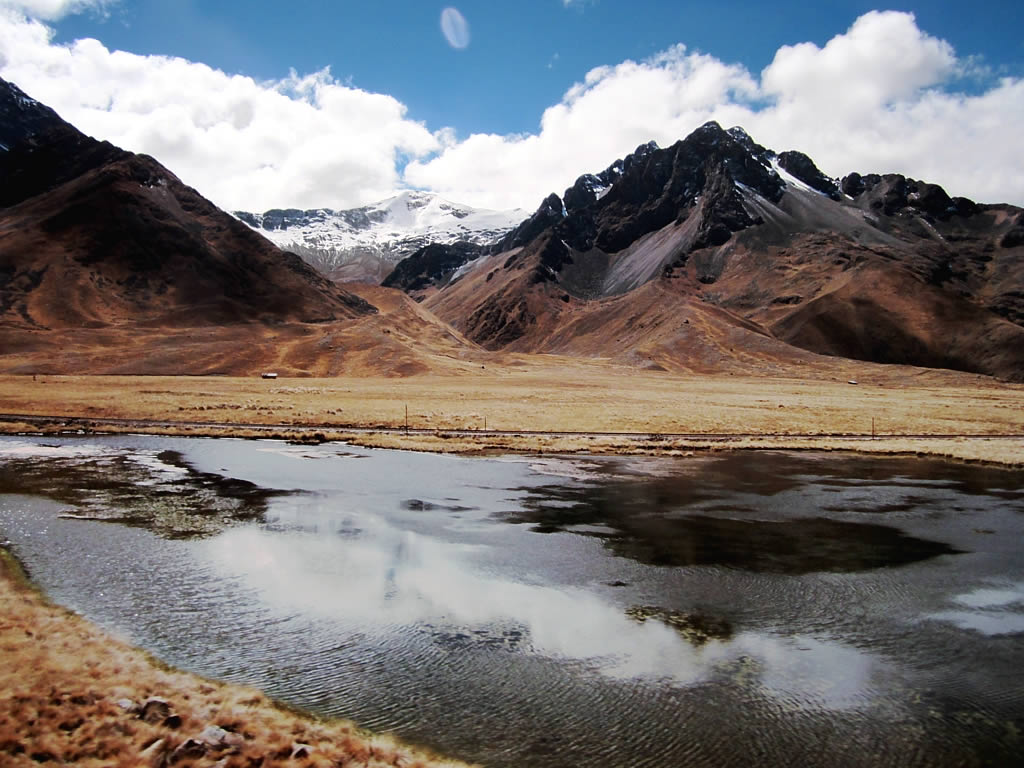
- Mountains at the La Raya pass

- Location of Melgar in the Puno Region
- Country: Peru
- Region: Puno
- Capital: Ayaviri

Government
  - Mayor: Esteban Alvarez Ccasa

Area
  - Total: 6,446.85 km^{2} (2,489.14 sq mi)
- Elevation: 3,907 m (12,818 ft)

Population
  - Total: 67,138
  - Density: 10.414/km^{2} (26.972/sq mi)
- UBIGEO: 2108
- Website: www.ayaviriweb.com

Melgar is a province of the Puno Region in Peru. The capital of the province is the city of Ayaviri.

== Geography ==
The Willkanuta range and the La Raya range traverse the province. Some of the highest mountains of the province are listed below:

- Achuqallani
- Aqu Punta
- Chachakumani
- Anqasi
- Chimpulla
- Chunta
- Chuwani
- Ch'iyar Jaqhi (Puno-Cusco)
- Ch'iyar Jaqhi (Melgar)
- Ch'iyar Salla
- Ch'ulla Rinri
- Ch'uxña Quta
- Hatun Ichhuna Kunka
- Hatun Sallika
- Hatun Yuraq Qaqa
- Hatunk'uchu
- Inka Kancha
- Jalanta
- Janq'u Q'awa
- Jarupata
- Lluxisa
- Kimsa Kunka
- Kuntur Saya
- Kunka
- Kuntur Pata
- Kuntur Sayana
- Kunturwasa
- Khunurana (Carabaya-Melgar)
- Khunurana (Melgar)
- Llallawi
- Mamaniri
- Maych'a Sinqa
- Minas Tira
- Misapata
- Misti Urqu
- Muru Muruni
- Muru Q'atawi
- Ñiq'i Quta
- Pichaqani
- Pirwani
- P'isaqani
- Puka Ch'uwaña
- Puka Parina
- Puka Urqu
- P'iya Qhuyani
- Qillqa
- Qillwa Quta
- Qinamari
- Quchak'uchu
- Qullpa Qaqa
- Qullpa Tira
- Qhuna Tira
- Q'atawi
- Q'illu Qaqa
- Sach'apata
- Salla Muqu
- Salla Tira
- Salla Wanqani
- Sampu
- Sapan Warmi
- Silla Qhata
- Silluta
- Sura Punta
- Surapata
- Taruja Marka
- T'aqañawi
- T'uqra
- Wamanlipani
- Wanq'uni
- Warmi Uma
- Waylla Wit'u
- Wila Pata
- Wilaquta
- Willkanuta
- Willu Punchu
- Wiqu
- Wisa Wisa (Lampa-Melgar)
- Wisa Wisa (Melgar)
- Wit'u Uma
- Yana Khuchilla
- Yana Qaqa
- Yana Salla
- Yanaqucha (Carabaya-Melgar)
- Yanaqucha (Melgar)
- Yaritani
- Yuraq Qaqa
- Yuraq Q'asa (near Chullupata)
- Yuraq Q'asa (near Pumanuta)

== Political division ==
The province measures 6,446.85 square kilometres (2,489.14 sq mi) and is divided into nine districts:

District	Mayor	Capital	Ubigeo
Antauta	Ignacio Edgar Chura Mendoza	Antauta	210802
Ayaviri	Bernardo Natividad Meza Alvarez	Ayaviri	210801
Cupi	Yudel Rene Mamani Cervantes	Cupi	210803
Llalli	Leon Vilca Gamarra	Llalli	210804
Macari	Simon Amador Mamani Chañi	Macari	210805
Nuñoa	Atilio Rodo Huaman Tapara	Nuñoa	210806
Orurillo	Juan Rene Quispe Chunga	Orurillo	210807
Santa Rosa	Filiberto Tacca Navarro	Santa Rosa	210808
Umachiri	N	Umachiri	210809

== Ethnic groups ==
The people in the province are mainly indigenous citizens of Quechua descent. Quechua is the language which the majority of the population (70.54%) learnt to speak in childhood, 29.09% of the residents started speaking using the Spanish language and 0.23% using Aymara (2007 Peru Census).

== See also ==
- Hatun Mayu
- Janq'uquta
- Mawk'allaqta
- Suyt'uqucha
