= Turpay District =

Turpay District Distrito de Turpay
- District
- Interactive map of Turpay District
- Coordinates: 14.219°S 72.624°W
- Country: Peru
- Region: Apurímac
- Province: Grau
- Founded: February 28, 1958
- Capital: Turpay

Government
  - Mayor: Simon Camposano Quispe

Area
  - Total: 52.34 km^{2} (20.21 sq mi)
- Elevation: 3,440 m (11,290 ft)

Population (2005 census)
  - Total: 831
  - Density: 15.9/km^{2} (41.1/sq mi)
- Time zone: UTC-5 (PET)
- UBIGEO: 030711

Turpay District is one of the fourteen districts of the province Grau in Peru.

== Ethnic groups ==
The people in the district are mainly indigenous citizens of Quechua descent. Quechua is the language which the majority of the population (70.67%) learnt to speak in childhood, 29.20% of the residents started speaking using the Spanish language (2007 Peru Census).
