= Ccotancaire =

Coordinates: 14°04′00″S 072°29′00″W

Ccotancaire is a populated place in Apurímac Region, Peru.

== See also ==
- Chuquibambilla
- Tambobamba
