= Ccullco =

Populated place in Apurímac Region, Peru

Coordinates: 13°57′35″S 072°29′37″W

Ccullco is a populated place in Apurímac Region, Peru.

== See also ==
- Abancay
- Chuquibambilla
- Tambobamba
