= Huayllati District =

Huayllati
- District
- Interactive map of Huayllati
- Coordinates: 13°55′40″S 72°29′02″W
- Country: Peru
- Region: Apurímac
- Province: Grau
- Founded: January 2, 1857
- Capital: Huayllati

Government
  - Mayor: Alfredo Palomino Gomez

Area
  - Total: 110.75 km^{2} (42.76 sq mi)
- Elevation: 3,481 m (11,421 ft)

Population (2005 census)
  - Total: 1,915
  - Density: 17.29/km^{2} (44.78/sq mi)
- Time zone: UTC-5 (PET)
- UBIGEO: 030704

Huayllati District is one of the fourteen districts of the province Grau in Peru.

== Ethnic groups ==
The people in the district are mainly indigenous citizens of Quechua descent. Quechua is the language which the majority of the population (90.74%) learnt to speak in childhood, 8.73% of the residents started speaking using the Spanish language (2007 Peru Census).
