= Progreso District =

Coordinates: 14.072°S 72.483°W

Progreso
- District
- Interactive map of Progreso
- Country: Peru
- Region: Apurímac
- Province: Grau
- Founded: March 17, 1958
- Capital: Progreso

Government
  - Mayor: Tomas Aquilino Huañec Huañec

Area
  - Total: 254.59 km^{2} (98.30 sq mi)
- Elevation: 3,850 m (12,630 ft)

Population (2005 census)
  - Total: 2,785
  - Density: 10.94/km^{2} (28.33/sq mi)
- Time zone: UTC-5 (PET)
- UBIGEO: 030708

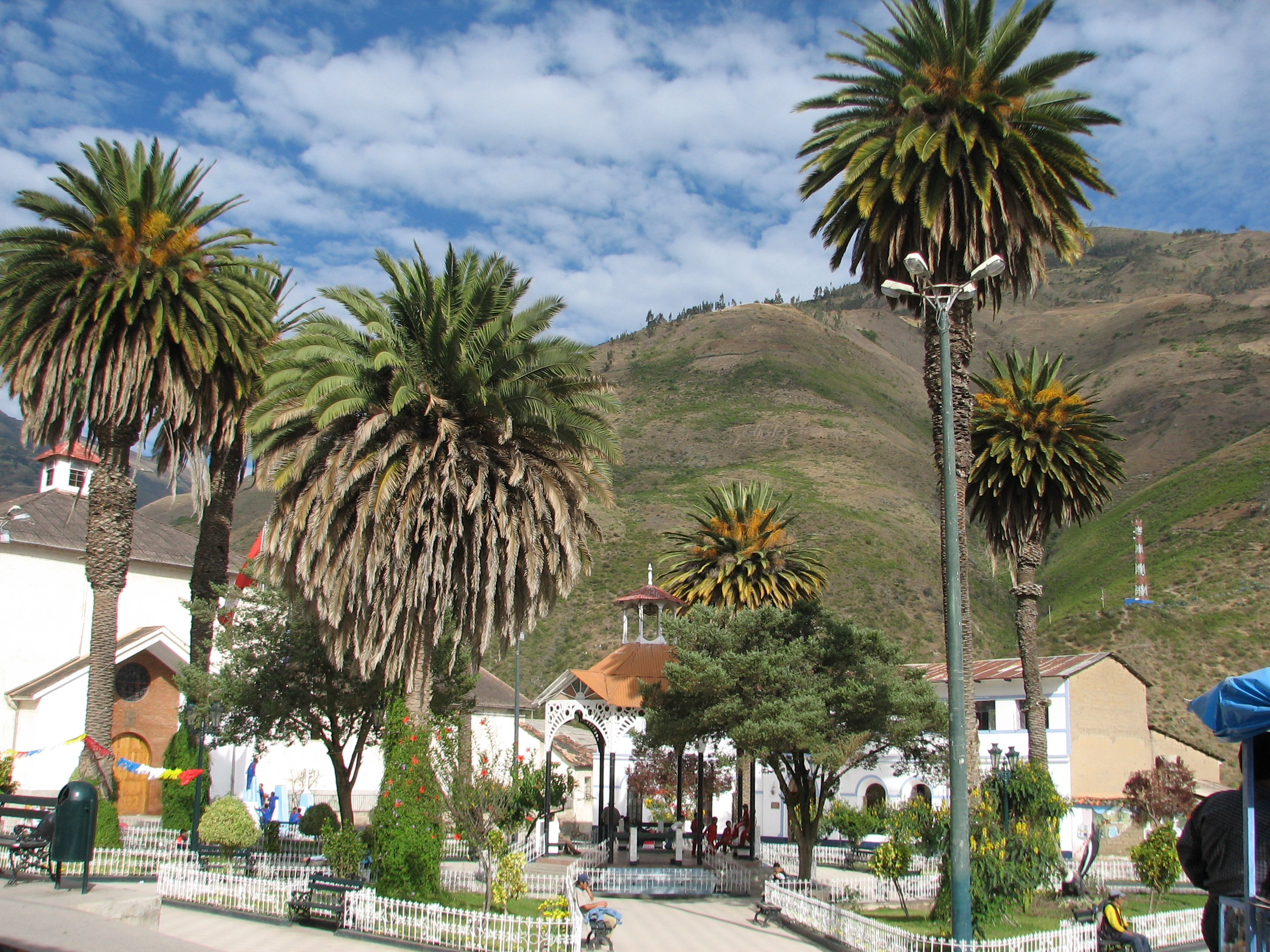
Abancazy Plaza, Apurímac, Peru.

Progreso District is one of the fourteen districts of the Grau Province in Peru.

== Geography ==
One of the highest peaks of the district is Intikancha at approximately 4,700 m (15,400 ft). Other mountains are listed below:

- Aqchi
- Aqu Q'asa
- Chunta
- Hatun Q'asa
- Jichuni
- Kimsa Kancha
- Lamrasniyuq
- Luntu Marka
- Llulluch'a Urqu
- Lluqu Lluqu
- Minas Pata
- Paqu Pampa
- Qutani
- Sallaq Rumi
- Silla Q'asa
- Sura Urqu
- Taku Sirka
- Usnu Qucha
- Usqulluni

== Ethnic groups ==
The people in the district are mainly indigenous citizens of Quechua descent. Quechua is the language which the majority of the population (86.96%) learnt to speak in childhood, 12.39% of the residents started speaking using the Spanish language (2007 Peru Census).
