= Intikancha (Apurímac) =

Mountain located in the Andes

- Location within Peru

Highest point
- Elevation: 4,700 m (15,400 ft)
- Coordinates: 14°11′08″S 72°26′02″W

Geography
- Location: Peru, Apurímac Region, Grau Province
- Parent range: Andes

Intikancha (Quechua inti sun, kancha enclosure, enclosed place, yard, a frame, or wall that encloses, "sun yard", Hispanicized spelling Inticancha) is a mountain in the Andes of Peru, about 4,700 metres (15,420 ft) high. It is situated in the Apurímac Region, Grau Province, in the south of the Progreso District.
