= Virundo District =

Coordinates: 14°15′00″S 72°40′48″W

Virundo
- District
- Interactive map of Virundo
- Country: Peru
- Region: Apurímac
- Province: Grau
- Founded: June 12, 1985
- Capital: San Juan de Virundo

Government
  - Mayor: Genaro Paucar Pinares

Area
  - Total: 117.19 km^{2} (45.25 sq mi)
- Elevation: 3,845 m (12,615 ft)

Population (2005 census)
  - Total: 1,158
  - Density: 9.881/km^{2} (25.59/sq mi)
- Time zone: UTC-5 (PET)
- UBIGEO: 030713

Virundo District is one of the fourteen districts of the Grau Province in Peru.

== Geography ==
One of the highest peaks of the district is Qusqu Qhawarina at approximately 4,800 m (15,700 ft). Other mountains are listed below:

- Anqasi
- Chunta
- Kampanayuq
- Kiswara
- Kuntur Marka
- Kuntur Silla
- Minas Urqu
- Pukarani
- Q'illa Q'illa
- Supayku Urqu
- Wanqarani
- Waswachani
- Yanama

== Ethnic groups ==
The people in the district are mainly indigenous citizens of Quechua descent. Quechua is the language which the majority of the population (81.59%) learnt to speak in childhood, 17.54% of the residents started speaking using the Spanish language (2007 Peru Census).
