= Orurillo District =

Coordinates: 14.7275°S 70.8031°W

Orurillo
- District
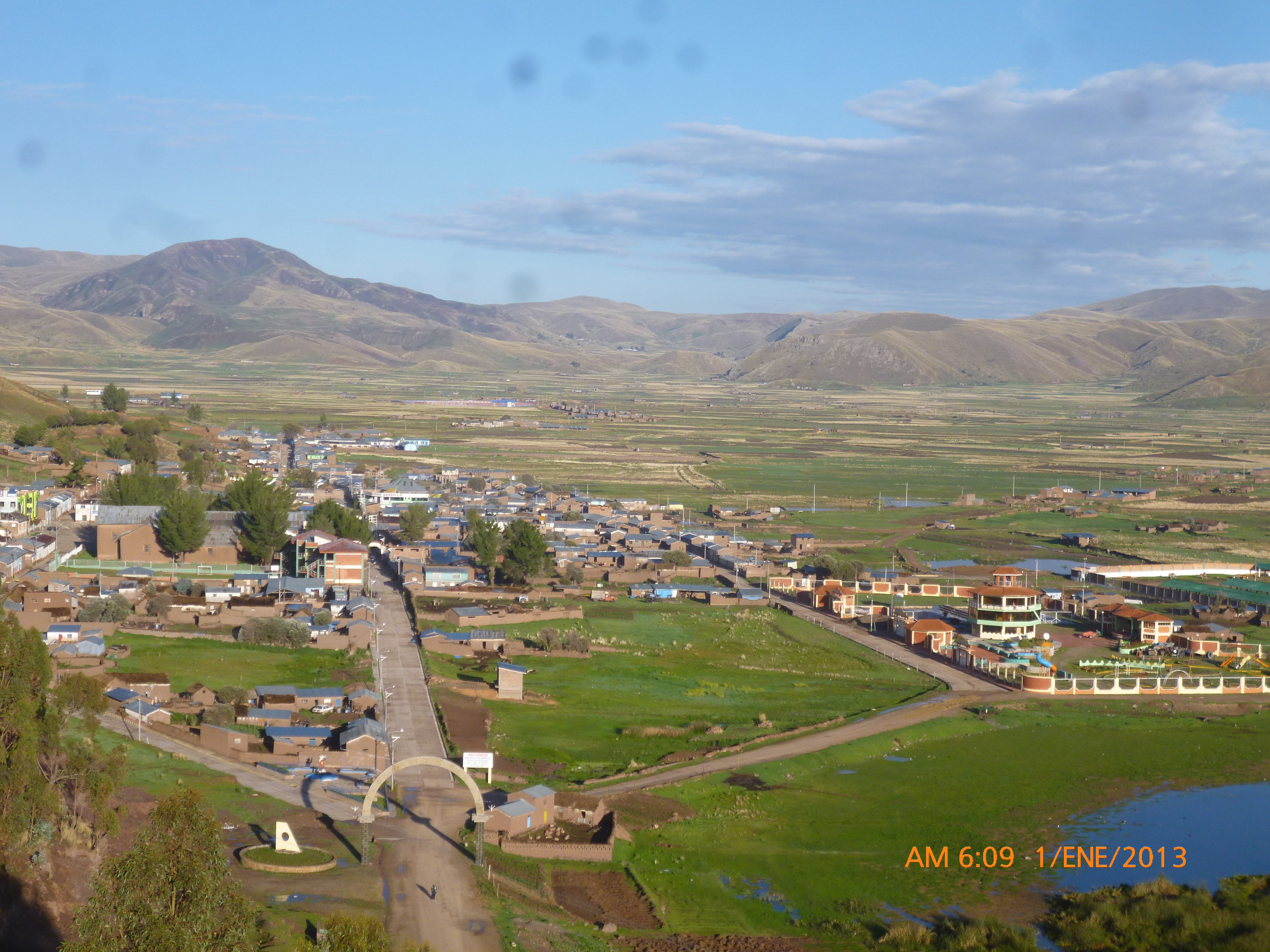
- Interactive map of Orurillo
- Country: Peru
- Region: Puno
- Province: Melgar
- Capital: Orurillo

Government
  - Mayor: Alain Yorkman Mendizábal Gutiérrez

Area
  - Total: 379.05 km^{2} (146.35 sq mi)
- Elevation: 3,890 m (12,760 ft)

Population (2017)
  - Total: 7,651
  - Density: 20.18/km^{2} (52.28/sq mi)
- Time zone: UTC-5 (PET)
- UBIGEO: 210807

Orurillo District is one of nine districts of the province Melgar in Peru.

== Ethnic groups ==
The people in the district are mainly indigenous citizens of Quechua descent. Quechua is the language which the majority of the population (87.82%) learnt to speak in childhood, 11.98 % of the residents started speaking using the Spanish language (2007 Peru Census).

== See also ==
- Hatun Mayu
- Janq'u Q'awa
- Janq'uquta
