= Vilcabamba District, Grau =

Coordinates: 14.076°S 72.626°W

Vilcabamba Willkapampa
- District
- Interactive map of Vilcabamba; Willkapampa
- Country: Peru
- Region: Apurímac
- Province: Grau
- Founded: February 20, 1941
- Capital: Vilcabamba

Government
  - Mayor: Jorge Luis Martinez Mejia

Area
  - Total: 7.97 km^{2} (3.08 sq mi)
- Elevation: 2,780 m (9,120 ft)

Population (2005 census)
  - Total: 1,119
  - Density: 140/km^{2} (364/sq mi)
- Time zone: UTC-5 (PET)
- UBIGEO: 030712

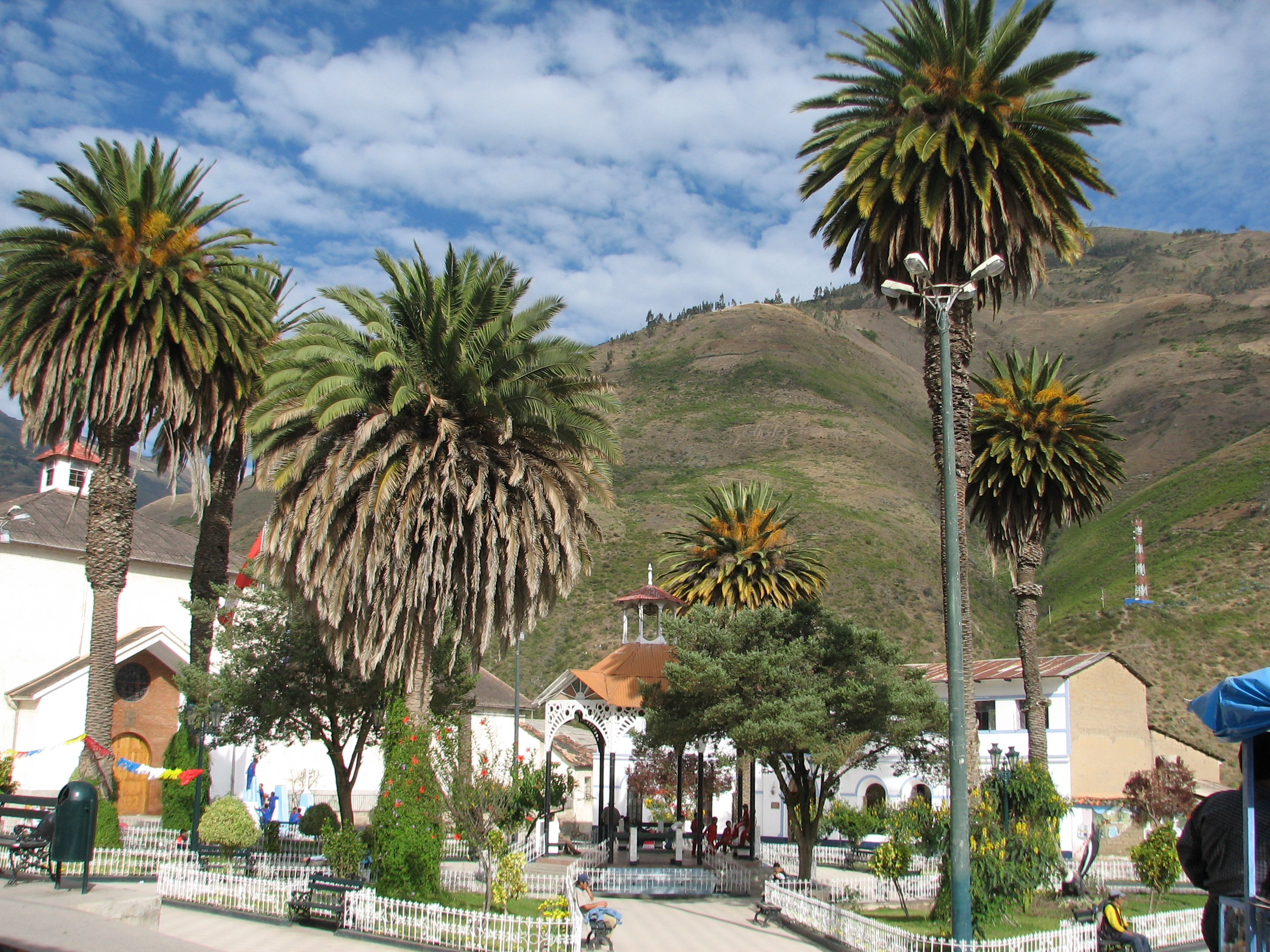

Vilcabamba District is one of the fourteen districts of the province Grau in Peru.

== Ethnic groups ==
The people in the district are mainly indigenous citizens of Quechua descent. Quechua is the language which the majority of the population (66.90%) learnt to speak in childhood, 32.49% of the residents started speaking using the Spanish language (2007 Peru Census).
