= Q'urawiri =

Mountain in Peru

- Location within Peru

Highest point
- Elevation: 5,000 m (16,000 ft)
- Coordinates: 14°02′08″S 72°48′18″W

Geography
- Location: Peru, Apurímac Region
- Parent range: Andes

Q'urawiri (Aymara for slinger, someone who catapults something, also spelled Qorawiri, Qurawiri, Hispanicized spelling Corahuiri) is a mountain in the Andes of Peru, about 5,000 metres (16,404 ft) high. It is located in the Apurímac Region, Abancay Province, Circa District, and in the Grau Province, Chuquibambilla District. Huch'uy Q'urawiri (Quechua huch'uy small, "little Q'urawiri") is northwest of it.
