= Tipiqucha (Apurímac) =

Lake in Peru

- Location within Peru
- Location: Peru; Apurímac Region
- Coordinates: 13°59′54″S 72°46′48″W

Tipiqucha (Quechua tipi Pennisetum clandestinum (a grass species), tipiy to husk maize, to snap, to break, qucha lake, hispanicized spelling Tipicocha) is a lake in Apurimac Region, Grau Province, Chuquibambilla District, Peru. It lies west of the lake Pachachaka (Pachachaca).

== See also ==
- List of lakes in Peru
