= San Antonio District, Grau =

Coordinates: 14°09′54″S 72°37′16″W

San Antonio
- District
- Interactive map of San Antonio
- Country: Peru
- Region: Apurímac
- Province: Grau
- Founded: March 17, 1958
- Capital: San Antonio

Government
  - Mayor: Willienthon Sanchez Silva

Area
  - Total: 24.12 km^{2} (9.31 sq mi)
- Elevation: 3,451 m (11,322 ft)

Population (2005 census)
  - Total: 532
  - Density: 22.1/km^{2} (57.1/sq mi)
- Time zone: UTC-5 (PET)
- UBIGEO: 030709

San Antonio District is one of the fourteen districts of the province Grau in Peru.

== Ethnic groups ==
The people in the district are mainly indigenous citizens of Quechua descent. Quechua is the language of which the majority of the population (62.95%) are native speakers; 37.05% of the population speaks fluent Spanish (2007 Peru Census).
