= Achucallani (Puno) =

Mountain in Peru

- Location within Peru

Highest point
- Elevation: 5,000 m (16,000 ft)
- Coordinates: 15°06′28″S 70°40′55″W

Naming
- Language of name: Aymara

Geography
- Location: Peru, Puno Region
- Parent range: Andes

Achucallani or Achuqallani (Aymara achuqalla weasel, -ni a suffix to indicate ownership, "the one with a weasel (or weasels)", Hispanicized spelling Achoccallane) is a mountain in the Andes of Peru, about 5,000 m (16,000 ft) high. It is located in the Puno Region, Melgar Province, Ayaviri District.
