= San Pablo District, Canchis =

Coordinates: 14.2020°S 71.3162°W

San Pablo District
- District
- Interactive map of San Pablo District
- Country: Peru
- Region: Cusco
- Province: Canchis
- Capital: San Pablo

Government
  - Mayor: Fredy Mendigure (2012-2014)

Area
  - Total: 524.06 km^{2} (202.34 sq mi)
- Elevation: 3,486 m (11,437 ft)

Population (2005 census)
  - Total: 5,951
  - Density: 11.36/km^{2} (29.41/sq mi)
- Time zone: UTC-5 (PET)
- UBIGEO: 080606

San Pablo District is one of eight districts of the province Canchis in Peru.

== Geography ==
The most important river of the district is the Willkanuta which crosses the district from southeast to northwest.

The Willkanuta mountain range traverses the district. Some of the highest mountains of the district are listed below:

- Anta
- Chachakumani
- Hatun Sallika
- Hatunk'uchu
- Inka Pirqa
- Jamp'atuni
- Pataqucha
- Qullpa K'uchu
- Qillwa Quta
- Quchak'uchu
- Qhupu Kunka
- Ramusniyuq
- Rayusqa
- Sura K'uchu
- Uqi Kunka
- Wari Muru
- Wari Sallani
- Wiqu
- Yuraq Unu Kunka

== Ethnic groups ==
The people in the district are mainly indigenous citizens of Quechua descent. Quechua is the language which the majority of the population (80.72%) learnt to speak in childhood, 19.02% of the residents started speaking using the Spanish language (2007 Peru Census).

== Mayors ==
- 2012-2014: Fredy Mendigure Quirita.
- 2011-2012: Rober Eleuterio Ccoa Aguilar.
- 2007-2010: Paulino Ccala Suyo.
