= Sambo (mountain) =

Mountain in Peru

- Location within Peru

Highest point
- Elevation: 5,200 m (17,100 ft)
- Coordinates: 14°11′04″S 70°51′43″W

Geography
- Location: Peru, Puno Region
- Parent range: Andes, Vilcanota

Sambo (possibly from Quechua for "knock-kneed" or "a person with one black and one indigenous parent") is a mountain in the Vilcanota mountain range in the Andes of Peru, about 5,200 metres (17,060 ft) high. It is situated in the Puno Region, Melgar Province, Nuñoa District. Sambo lies southwest of Hueco and Quellhuacota and northwest of Huillopuncho.
