= Yuraq Q'asa (Pumanuta) =

Mountain in Peru

- Location within Peru

Highest point
- Elevation: 4,800 m (15,700 ft)
- Coordinates: 14°19′15″S 70°40′52″W

Naming
- Language of name: Quechua

Geography
- Location: Peru, Puno Region, Melgar Province, Nuñoa District
- Parent range: Andes, Willkanuta

Yuraq Q'asa or Yuraqq'asa (Quechua yuraq white, q'asa mountain pass, "white mountain pass", Hispanicized spelling Yurac Jasa) is a mountain in the Willkanuta mountain range in the Andes of Peru, about 4,800 metres (15,748 ft) high. It is located in the Puno Region, Melgar Province, in the Nuñoa District, near a place named Pumanuta.
