= Chinaqucha =

Lake in Peru

- Location within Peru
- Location: Peru; Apurímac Region, Grau Province
- Coordinates: 13°54′56″S 72°42′52″W

Chinaqucha (Quechua china female, qucha lake, "female lake", Hispanicized spelling Chinacocha) is a lake in Peru located in the Apurímac Region, Grau Province, Curpahuasi District. It is situated east of Urququcha (Quechua for "male lake").
