= Nuñoa District =

Coordinates: 14°28′48″S 70°38′28″W

Nuñuwa
- District
- Interactive map of Nuñuwa
- Country: Peru
- Region: Puno
- Province: Melgar
- Capital: Nuñoa

Government
  - Mayor: Atilio Rodo Huaman Tapara

Area
  - Total: 2,200.16 km^{2} (849.49 sq mi)
- Elevation: 4,016 m (13,176 ft)

Population (2005 census)
  - Total: 13,598
  - Density: 6.1805/km^{2} (16.007/sq mi)
- Time zone: UTC-5 (PET)
- UBIGEO: 210806

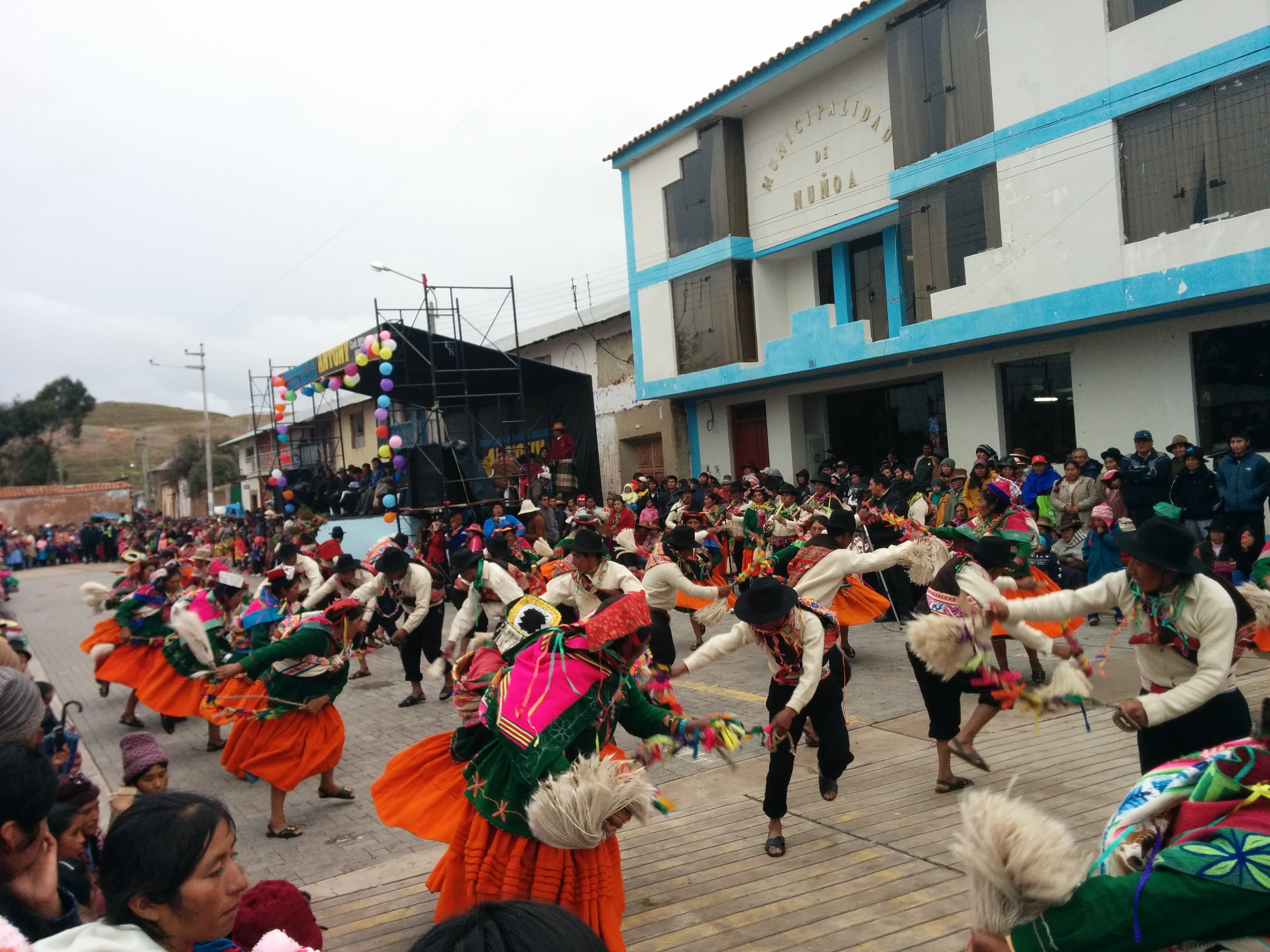

Nuñuwa District is one of nine districts of the Melgar Province in Peru. The town of Nuñoa has become a destination for tourists as they start the climb to Machu Picchu. The growth of this local tourist industry has been stimulating changes in society, as the anthropologist Morgan Hoke has shown in a study of the impact of tourist eateries, especially pizzerias, on dairy and cheese production and on consequently on women's participation in the Nuñoa economy.

== Geography ==
Some of the highest mountains of the district are listed below:

- Aqu Punta
- Chuwani
- Ch'iyar Jaqhi (Cusco-Puno)
- Ch'iyar Jaqhi (Melgar)
- Jarupata
- Hatun Sallika
- Hatun Yuraq Qaqa
- Hatunk'uchu
- Kuntur Pata
- Kuntur Saya
- Khunurana
- Lluxisa
- Minas Tira
- Misti Urqu
- P'allchani
- Pirwani
- Puka Ch'uwaña
- Puka Parina
- P'iya Qhuyani
- Qillwa Quta
- Quchak'uchu
- Qullpa Qaqa
- Qhuna Tira
- Q'illu Qaqa
- Sach'apata
- Salla Muqu
- Salla Tira
- Salla Wanqani
- Sampu
- Silla Qhata
- Surapata
- Sura Punta
- Waylla Wit'u
- Wila Pata
- Willu Punchu
- Wiqu
- Wisa Wisa
- Wit'u Uma
- Yanaqucha
- Yuraq Q'asa (Chullupata)
- Yuraq Q'asa (Pumanuta)

== Ethnic groups ==
The people in the district are mainly indigenous citizens of Quechua descent. Quechua is the language which the majority of the population (83.60%) learnt to speak in childhood, 16.04 % of the residents started speaking using the Spanish language (2007 Peru Census).

== See also ==
- Hatun Mayu
- Mawk'allaqta
