= Yanacocha (Carabaya-Melgar) =

Mountain in Peru near Cusco

- Location within Peru

Highest point
- Elevation: 5,000 m (16,000 ft)
- Coordinates: 14°08′36″S 70°38′08″W

Geography
- Location: Peru, Puno Region
- Parent range: Andes, Vilcanota

Yanacocha (possibly from Quechua yana black, qucha lake, "black lake") is a mountain in the Vilcanota mountain range in the Andes of Peru, about 5,000 metres (16,404 ft) high. The mountain is located in Macusani District, Carabaya Province, and Nuñoa District, Melgar Province, both in Puno Region. Yanacocha lies south of the river Ninahuisa.
