= Jatun Sallica =

Mountain in Peru

- Location within Peru

Highest point
- Elevation: 5,200 m (17,100 ft)
- Coordinates: 14°06′36″S 70°48′26″W

Geography
- Location: Peru, Cusco Region, Puno Region
- Parent range: Andes, Vilcanota

Jatun Sallica (possibly from Quechua hatun big, sallika rosemary (Rosmarinus officinalis)) is a mountain in the Vilcanota mountain range Andes of Peru, about 5,200 metres (17,060 ft) high. It is located in the Cusco Region, Canchis Province, San Pablo District, and in the Puno Region, Melgar Province, Nuñoa District. Jatun Sallica is situated south-west of the mountains Pomanota and Jatuncucho, south of the mountain Cochacucho and north-east of the mountain Hueco.
