= Cupi District =

Coordinates: 14.9041°S 70.8708°W

Cupi
- District
- Interactive map of Cupi
- Country: Peru
- Region: Puno
- Province: Melgar
- Capital: Cupi

Government
  - Mayor: Yudel Rene Mamani Cervantes

Area
  - Total: 214.25 km^{2} (82.72 sq mi)
- Elevation: 3,953 m (12,969 ft)

Population (2005 census)
  - Total: 2,516
  - Density: 11.74/km^{2} (30.41/sq mi)
- Time zone: UTC-5 (PET)
- UBIGEO: 210803

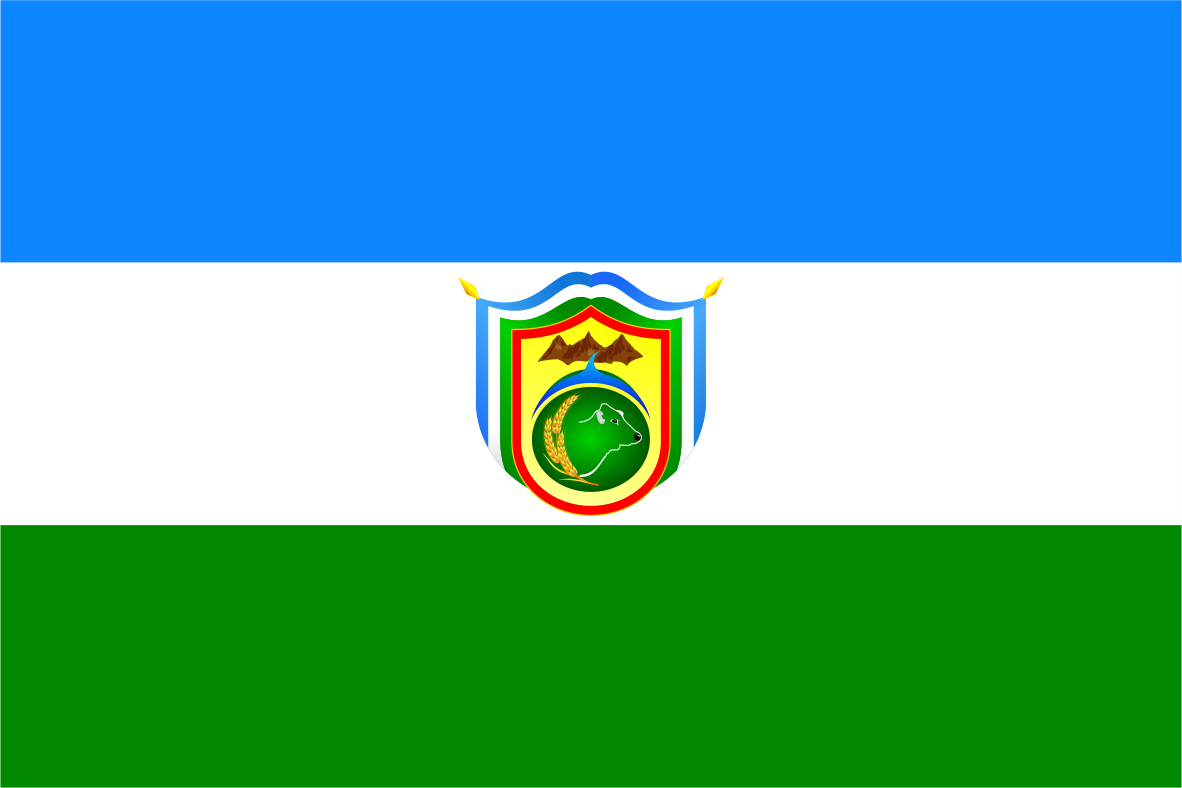
Flag of Cupi

Cupi District is one of nine districts of the province Melgar in Peru.

== Ethnic groups ==
The people in the district are mainly indigenous citizens of Quechua descent. Quechua is the language which the majority of the population (88.00%) learnt to speak in childhood, 11.79% of the residents started speaking using the Spanish language (2007 Peru Census).
