= Qillqa (Melgar) =

Mountain in Peru

- Location within Peru

Highest point
- Elevation: 4,900.9 m (16,079 ft)
- Coordinates: 14°43′13″S 71°04′53″W

Geography
- Location: Peru, Puno Region, Melgar Province
- Parent range: Andes

Qillqa (Quechua for writing (the act and art of writing) Hispanicized spelling Quilca) is a mountain in the Andes of Peru, about 4,900.9 metres (16,079 ft) high. It is located in the Puno Region, Melgar Province, Macari District, near the border with the Cusco Region, Espinar Province, Alto Pichigua District.
