= Pucaparina =

Mountain in Peru

- Location within Peru

Highest point
- Elevation: 4,800 m (15,700 ft)
- Coordinates: 14°15′20″S 70°45′04″W

Geography
- Location: Peru, Puno Region
- Parent range: Andes, Vilcanota

Pucaparina (possibly from Aymara puka colored, Quechua puka red, Aymara parina flamingo, "colored flamingo" or "red flamingo") is a mountain in the Vilcanota mountain range in the Andes of Peru, about 4,800 metres (15,748 ft) high. It lies in the Puno Region, Melgar Province, Nuñoa District.
