= Antauta District =

Coordinates: 14.8819°S 70.5900°W

Antauta
- District
- Interactive map of Antauta
- Country: Peru
- Region: Puno
- Province: Melgar
- Founded: October 25, 1901
- Capital: Antauta

Government
  - Mayor: Ignacio Edgar Chura Mendoza

Area
  - Total: 636.17 km^{2} (245.63 sq mi)
- Elevation: 4,150 m (13,620 ft)

Population (2005 census)
  - Total: 6,887
  - Density: 10.83/km^{2} (28.04/sq mi)
- Time zone: UTC-5 (PET)
- UBIGEO: 210802

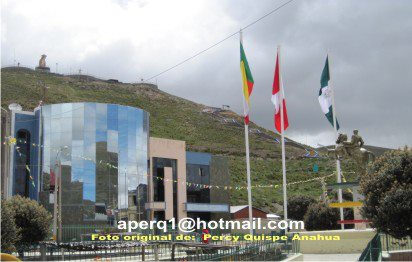
Plaza de San Martin in Antauta District, Puno, Peru

Antauta District is one of nine districts of the province Melgar in Peru.

== Geography ==
Some of the highest mountains of the district are listed below:

- Aqu Punta
- Chachakumani
- Chunta
- Chuwani
- Ch'iyar Salla
- Jalanta
- Kimsa Kunka
- Kuntur Pata
- Kuntur Sayana
- Llallawi
- Maych'a Sinqa
- Minas Tira
- Misti Urqu
- Muru Muruni
- Pirwani
- P'isaqani
- Qinamari
- Qullpa Tira
- Q'illu Qaqa
- Salla Muqu
- Sura Punta
- Wamanlipani
- Wanq'uni
- Warmi Uma
- Willkanuta
- Yana Salla

== Ethnic groups ==
The people in the district are mainly indigenous citizens of Quechua descent. Quechua is the language which the majority of the population (69.23%) learnt to speak in childhood, 30.28% of the residents started speaking using the Spanish language (2007 Peru Census).
