= Hatun Mayu =

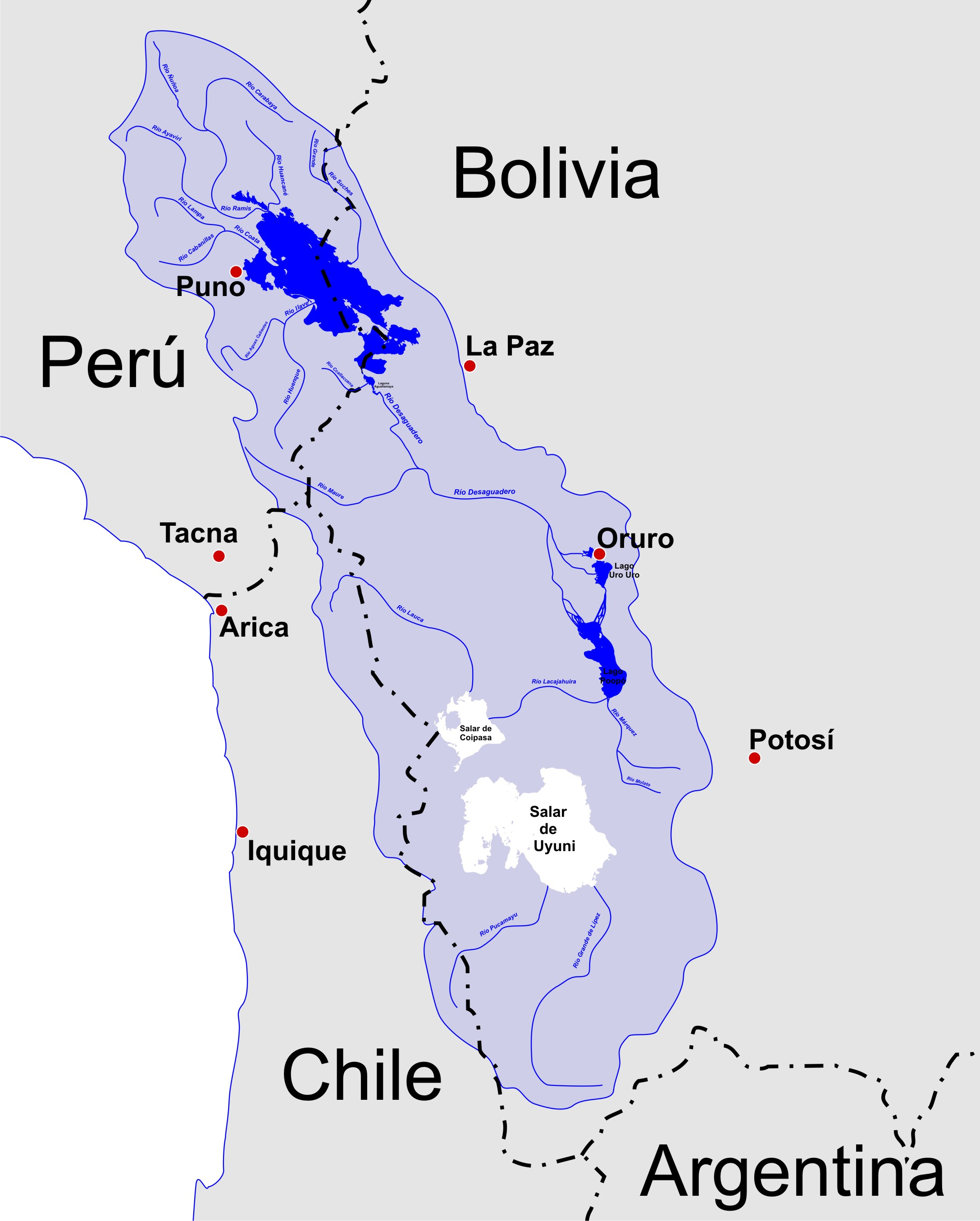
- Sketch map showing the location of Hatun Mayu (Nuñoa) and its confluence with the Cucero River (here labelled Carabaya)
- Etymology: Quechua

Location
- Country: Peru
- Region: Puno Region

Physical characteristics
- Source: Andes, Willkanuta
  - location: Corani District, Nuñoa District, Puno, Peru
  - coordinates: 14°04′38″S 70°43′24″W
- Mouth: Crucero River
  - location: Asillo District, Puno, Peru
  - coordinates: 14°46′29″S 70°17′09″W
  - elevation: 0 m (0 ft)

Hatun Mayu (Quechua hatun big, mayu river, "big river", also spelled Jatun Mayo) which upstream is called Qinamari (Quenamari) and downstream successively is named Nuñoa and Río Grande (Spanish for "big river") is a river in Peru. It is a right tributary of the Crucero River whose waters flow to Lake Titicaca. It is located in the Puno Region, Azángaro Province, Asillo District, and in the Melgar Province, in the districts Nuñoa and Orurillo.

Named Qinamari it originates in the Willkanuta mountain range east of the mountain Khunurana at the border of the Corani District of the Carabaya Province and the Nuñoa District. At first its direction is to the southwest along the mountains Jarupata and Qhuna Tira where Llankamayu (Llancamayo) joins the river. Before reaching the mountain Antalluku (Andalloco) it turns to the southeast. Now it gets the name Hatun Mayu. After the confluence with Sawap'unqu (Sahuapunco) it receives the name Nuñoa. It flows along Nuñoa and keeps the name until Juruwiña River meets the river as a left tributary. From now on it is called Río Grande. At first the river flows along the border of the districts Nuñoa and Orurillo. Then it crosses Orurillo District and enters Asillo District where it meets Crucero River east of Asillo.
