= Curpahuasi District =

Coordinates: 14.062°S 72.670°W

Curpahuasi Qurpa Wasi
- District
- Interactive map of Curpahuasi
- Country: Peru
- Region: Apurímac
- Province: Grau
- Founded: November 24, 1955
- Capital: Curpahuasi

Government
  - Mayor: Ladio Roman Trujillo

Area
  - Total: 293.42 km^{2} (113.29 sq mi)
- Elevation: 3,438 m (11,280 ft)

Population (2005 census)
  - Total: 2,540
  - Density: 8.66/km^{2} (22.4/sq mi)
- Time zone: UTC-5 (PET)
- UBIGEO: 030702

Curpahuasi District is one of the fourteen districts of the Grau Province in Peru.

== Geography ==
One of the highest peaks of the district is Waman Ch'arpa at approximately 4,600 m (15,100 ft). Other mountains are listed below:

- Allqa Q'awa
- Anta Marka
- Aqu Qucha
- Kachi Kutana
- Pukara
- Puma Wasi
- Q'illu
- Waqutu
- Wayunkani
- Winq'u Pata
- Yana Urqu
- Yawriwiri

== Ethnic groups ==
The people in the district are mainly indigenous citizens of Quechua descent. Quechua is the language which the majority of the population (92.62%) learnt to speak in childhood, 7.10% of the residents started speaking using the Spanish language (2007 Peru Census).

== Climate ==
Climate data for Curpahuasi, elevation 3,535 m (11,598 ft), (1991–2020)
Month	Jan	Feb	Mar	Apr	May	Jun	Jul	Aug	Sep	Oct	Nov	Dec	Year
Mean daily maximum °C (°F)	21.6 (70.9)	20.5 (68.9)	20.3 (68.5)	20.5 (68.9)	20.2 (68.4)	20.4 (68.7)	20.2 (68.4)	21.9 (71.4)	22.8 (73.0)	23.2 (73.8)	24.6 (76.3)	22.8 (73.0)	21.6 (70.9)
Mean daily minimum °C (°F)	6.9 (44.4)	7.0 (44.6)	7.1 (44.8)	6.3 (43.3)	4.4 (39.9)	2.6 (36.7)	2.4 (36.3)	3.9 (39.0)	5.6 (42.1)	6.8 (44.2)	7.5 (45.5)	7.3 (45.1)	5.6 (42.2)
Average precipitation mm (inches)	173.4 (6.83)	216.4 (8.52)	147.7 (5.81)	41.4 (1.63)	7.1 (0.28)	7.4 (0.29)	5.6 (0.22)	9.8 (0.39)	17.2 (0.68)	50.9 (2.00)	66.4 (2.61)	133.8 (5.27)	877.1 (34.53)
Source: National Meteorology and Hydrology Service of Peru

== See also ==
- Chinaqucha
- Urququcha
