= Surapata (Melgar) =

Mountain in Peru

- Location within Peru

Highest point
- Elevation: 5,300 m (17,400 ft)
- Coordinates: 14°10′58″S 70°49′01″W

Geography
- Location: Peru, Puno Region
- Parent range: Andes, Vilcanota

Surapata is a mountain in the Vilcanota mountain range in the Andes of Peru, about 5,300 metres (17,388 ft) high. It is situated in the Puno Region, Melgar Province, Nuñoa District. It lies between Salla Tira in the east and Sambo in the west.
