= Chiaracce (Melgar) =

Mountain in Peru

- Location within Peru

Highest point
- Elevation: 4,900 m (16,100 ft)
- Coordinates: 14°16′13″S 70°51′31″W

Geography
- Location: Peru, Puno Region
- Parent range: Andes, Vilcanota

Chiaracce (possibly from Aymara ch'iyara black, jaqhi precipice, cliff, "black cliff") is a mountain in the Vilcanota mountain range in the Andes of Peru, about 4,900 metres (16,076 ft) high. It is situated in the Puno Region, Melgar Province, Nuñoa District. Chiaracce lies southeast of the mountain Chiaraje on the border of the Cusco Region and the Puno Region and east of the mountain Lliptani.
