= Chuquibambilla District =

Coordinates: 14°06′07″S 72°42′25″W

- District
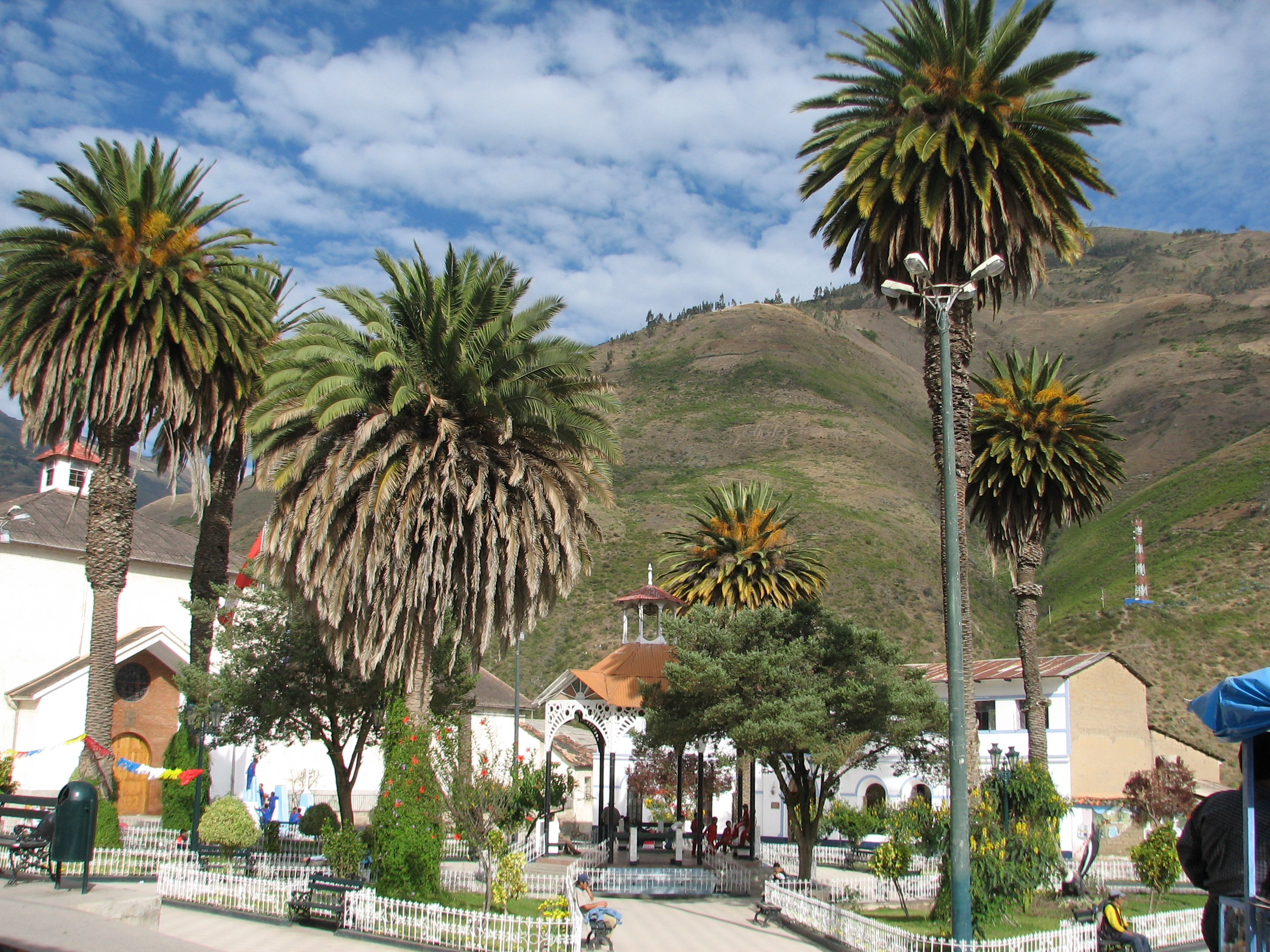
- Interactive map of Chuquibambilla District
- Country: Peru
- Region: Apurímac
- Province: Grau
- Capital: Chuquibambilla

Government
  - Mayor: Wilfredo Pareja Ayerve

Area
  - Total: 432.5 km^{2} (167.0 sq mi)
- Elevation: 3,320 m (10,890 ft)

Population (2005 census)
  - Total: 6,041
  - Density: 13.97/km^{2} (36.18/sq mi)
- Time zone: UTC-5 (PET)
- UBIGEO: 030701

Chuquibambilla District is one of the fourteen districts of the Grau Province in Peru.

== Geography ==
One of the highest peaks of the district is Q'urawiri at approximately 5,000 m (16,000 ft). Other mountains are listed below:

- Anta Pata
- Ch'aqu Urqu
- Ikma
- Lurituyuq
- Markayuq
- Nina Q'asa
- Pampa Urqu
- Puka Qaqa
- Pumani
- Puyani
- P'ukru
- Qillqas
- Qiwlla
- Qucha Pata
- Sasawini
- Suniq
- Suparawra
- Sura Pata
- Tipi Qucha
- T'uqu Pata
- Uqhu Pata
- Wayu
- Willka Marka
- Wisani
- Yana Qucha
- Yana Urqu

== Ethnic groups ==
The people in the district are mainly indigenous citizens of Quechua descent. Quechua is the language which the majority of the population (61.60%) learnt to speak in childhood, 37.84% of the residents started speaking using the Spanish language (2007 Peru Census).

== See also ==
- Tipiqucha
