= Cochacucho =

Mountain in Peru

- Location within Peru

Highest point
- Elevation: 5,300 m (17,400 ft)
- Coordinates: 14°05′43″S 70°48′09″W

Geography
- Location: Peru, Cusco Region, Puno Region
- Parent range: Andes, Vilcanota

Cochacucho (possibly from Quechua qucha lake, k'uchu corner, inside corner or outward angle) is a mountain in the Vilcanota mountain range in the Andes of Peru. The mountain is about 5,300 metres (17,388 ft) high. It is located in the Cusco Region, Canchis Province, San Pablo District, and in the Puno Region, Melgar Province, Nuñoa District. It is situated southwest of the mountains Pomanota and Jatuncucho, and north of the mountain Jatun Sallica.

The lake named Cochacucho lies southwest of the mountain in San Pablo District at 14°06′42″S 70°49′09″W.
