= Yuracjasa (Chullupata) =

Mountain in Peru

- Location within Peru

Highest point
- Elevation: 5,000 m (16,000 ft)
- Coordinates: 14°11′45″S 70°33′9″W

Naming
- Language of name: Quechua

Geography
- Location: Peru, Puno Region
- Parent range: Andes, Vilcanota

Yuracjasa (possibly from Quechua yuraq white, q'asa mountain pass, "white mountain pass") is a mountain in the Vilcanota mountain range in the Andes of Peru, about 5,000 metres (16,404 ft) high. It is located in the Puno Region, Melgar Province, in the north of the Nuñoa District, near Chullupata.
