= Jampatune =

Mountain in Peru

- Location within Peru

Highest point
- Elevation: 5,300 m (17,400 ft)
- Coordinates: 14°4′7″S 70°48′46″W

Geography
- Location: Peru, Cusco Region, Puno Region
- Parent range: Andes, Vilcanota

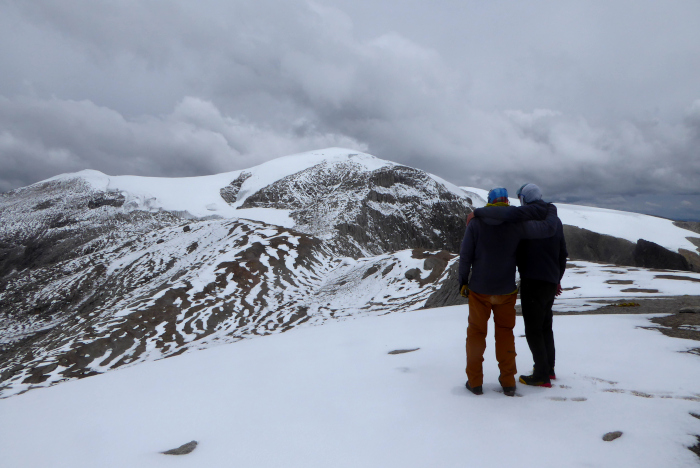
View from the top of Jampatune toward Pumanota (center) and "Pumanota Norte" (left).

Jampatune (possibly from Aymara jamp'atu, jamp'at'u frog, -ni a suffix to indicate ownership, "the one with a frog") is a mountain in the Vilcanota mountain range in the Andes of Peru, about 5,300 metres (17,388 ft) high.

Although Jampatune is a named peak, it is rather a shoulder of its higher neighbor to the east, Nevado Pumanota: Maps suggest a prominence from the shared saddle of just under 30 metres (100 ft) and this estimate was confirmed during the first reported ascent of both peaks by Andrew Thorburn (USA), Ulli Bayer (USA) and John Biggar (of Andes.org.uk) on Nov 12 2025.

== Geography ==
It is situated in the Cusco Region, Canchis Province, San Pablo District, and in the Puno Region, Carabaya Province, Corani District. Jampatune lies west of the mountain Nevado Pumanota and east of the mountain Nevado Culi.
