= Jonorana (Carabaya-Melgar) =

Mountain in Peru

- Location within Peru

Highest point
- Elevation: 5,553 m (18,219 ft)
- Coordinates: 14°05′01″S 70°46′11″W

Geography
- Location: Peru, Puno Region, Carabaya Province, Melgar Province
- Parent range: Andes, Vilcanota

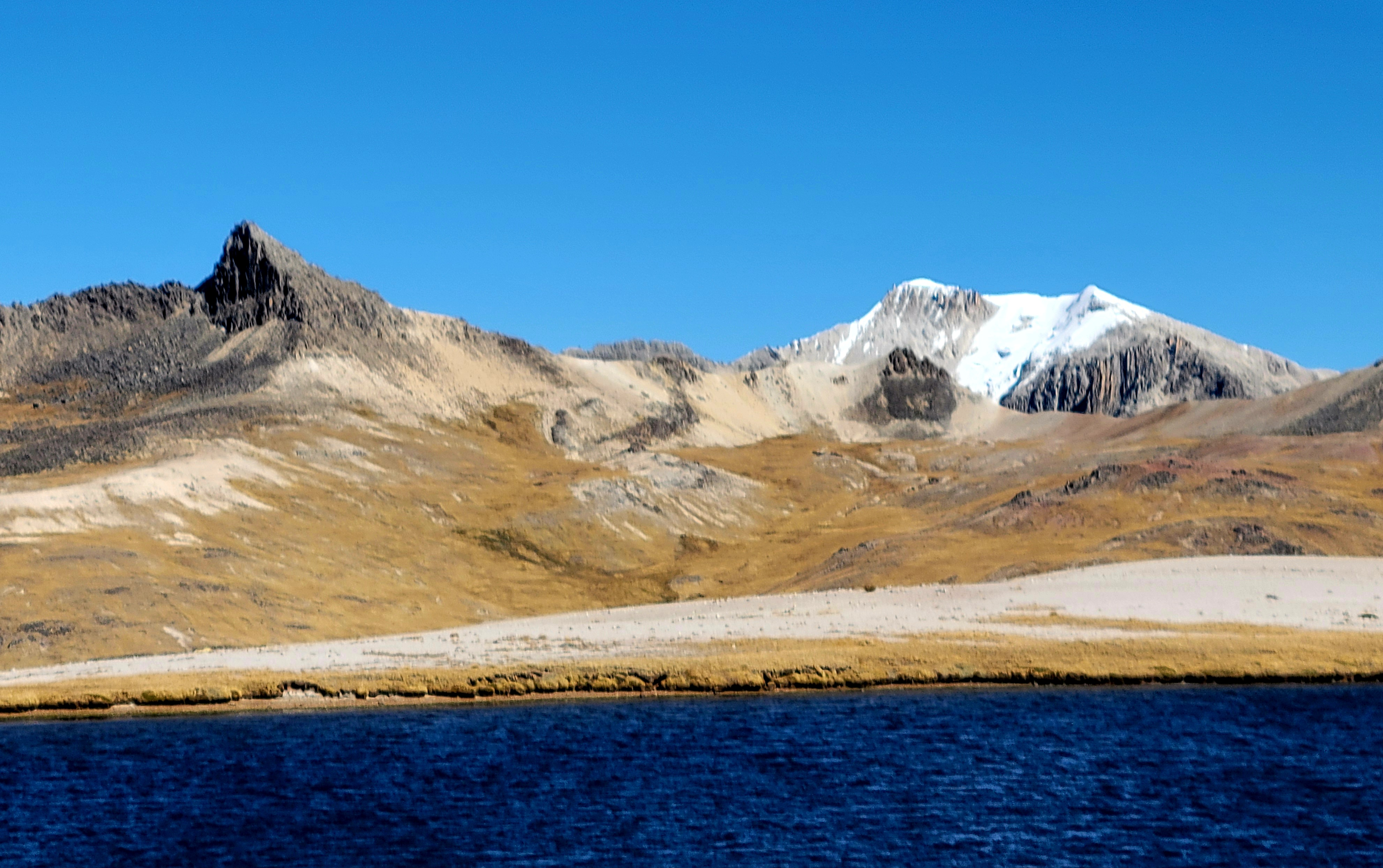
Jonorana (right) and Sachapata (left) from the east.

Jonorana (possibly from Aymara for a variety of potato of the qhini group) is a 5,553-metre-high (18,219 ft) mountain in the Vilcanota mountain range in the Andes of Peru. It is situated in the Puno Region, Carabaya Province, Corani District, and in the Melgar Province, Nuñoa District. Jonorana lies east of Jatuncucho, southeast of Jampatune and Pomanota, and northwest of Conatira. Jonorana is glaciated and is likely the highest peak in the southern Vilcanota range, i.e. the part south of the Quelccaya ice cap. The first reported ascent was done on Aug 11 2026 by a team composed of Ulli Bayer (USA) and Jackie and Andrew Thorburn (USA), led by John Biggar (of Andes.org.uk).
