= Jatuncucho =

Mountain in Peru near Cusco

- Location within Peru

Highest point
- Elevation: 5,400 m (17,700 ft)
- Coordinates: 14°04′58″S 70°47′28″W

Geography
- Location: Peru, Puno Region
- Parent range: Andes, Vilcanota

Jatuncucho (possibly from Quechua hatun big, k'uchu corner) is a mountain in the Vilcanota mountain range in the Andes of Peru, about 5,400 metres (17,717 ft) high. It is situated in the Cusco Region, Canchis Province, San Pablo District, in the Puno Region, Carabaya Province, Corani District, and in the Melgar Province, Nuñoa District. Jatuncucho lies between Pomanota in the north-west and Jonorana in the east and north-east of the mountain Cochacucho.
