= Pomanota =

Mountain in Peru

- Location within Peru

Highest point
- Elevation: 5,516 m (18,097 ft)
- Coordinates: 14°04′19″S 70°47′53″W

Geography
- Location: Cusco Region, Puno Region
- Parent range: Andes, Vilcanota

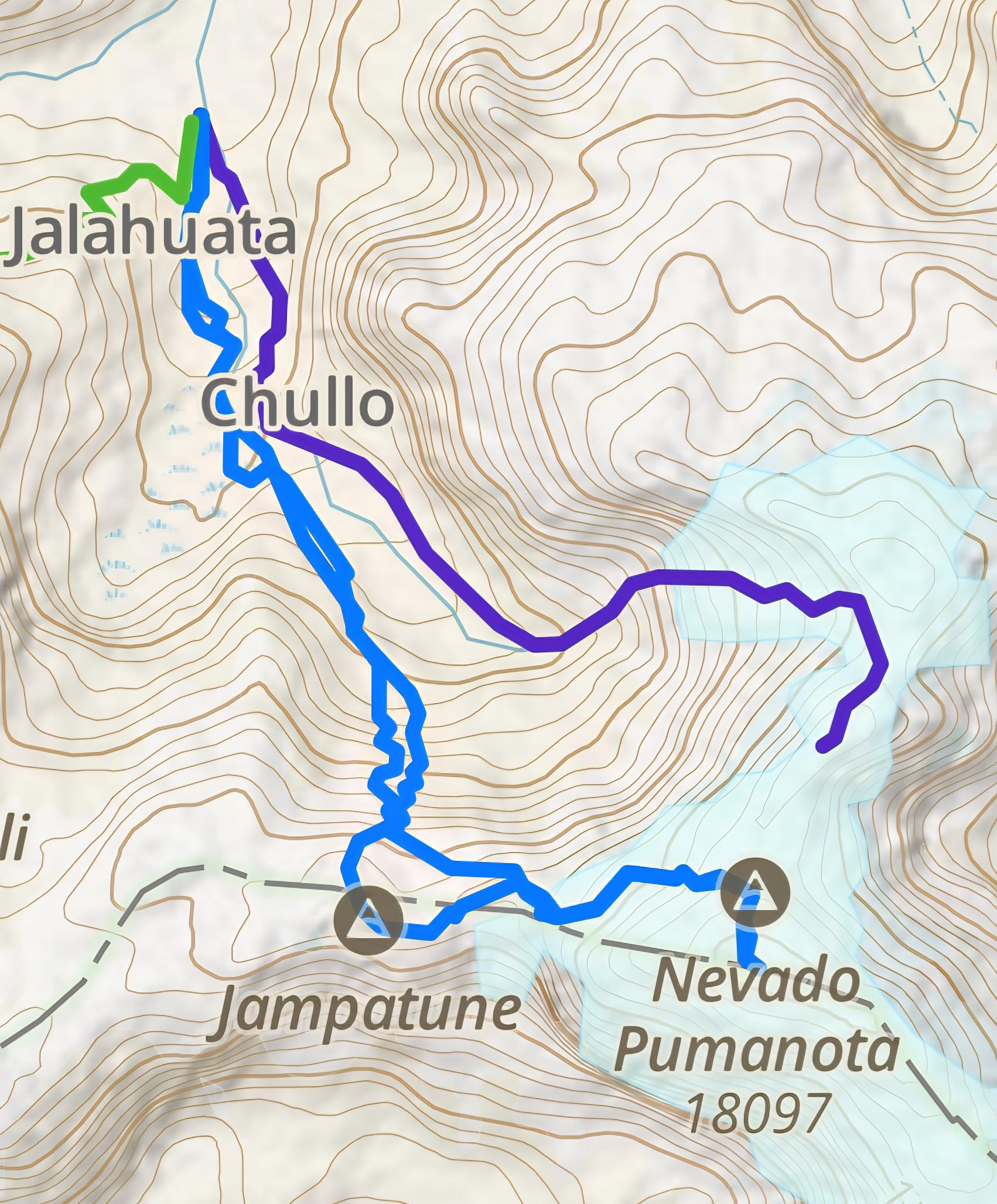
GPS tracks of the first reported ascents of Pumanota (via the Caracara glacier route; blue) and "Pumanota Norte" (via the Condor glacier route; purple).

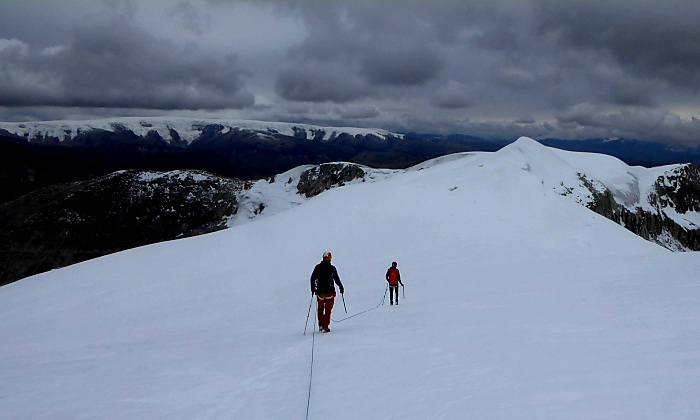
On the descent from Pumanota, with "Pumanota Norte" on the right and the Quelccaya ice cap in the distance.

Pomanota, or Nevado Pumanota, (possibly from Aymara puma cougar, puma, -n(i) a suffix, uta house, "house of the puma") is a mountain in the Vilcanota mountain range in the Andes of Peru, about 5,516 metres (18,097 ft) high. It is situated in the Cusco Region, Canchis Province, San Pablo District and in the Puno Region, Carabaya Province, Corani District as well as in the Melgar Province, Nuñoa District. Pomanota lies southeast of Joyllor Puñuna, the highest elevation in the glaciated area of Quelccaya (Quechua for "snow plain"); its neighbors to the east and west are Culi and Jonorana.

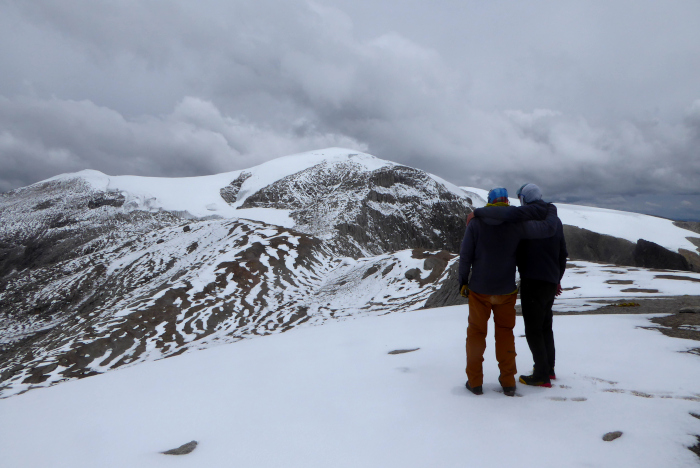
Pumanota (center) and "Pumanota Norte" (left) from Jampatune, with Andrew Thorburn and Ulli Bayer in the foreground.

The first reported ascent of Nevado Pumanota was achieved on 12 November 2025 via the Caracara glacier route by a team composed of Andrew Thorburn (USA) and Ulli Bayer (USA), under the leadership of John Biggar (of Andes.org.uk). One day earlier, the same team, with addition of Daniel Choquet (France) and Vito Ricciardi (Wales), achieved the first reported ascent of "Pumanota Norte" (5,474 metres; 17,959 ft) via the Condor glacier route.
