= Chuquibambilla =

Chuquibambilla Chuqipampilla
- Town
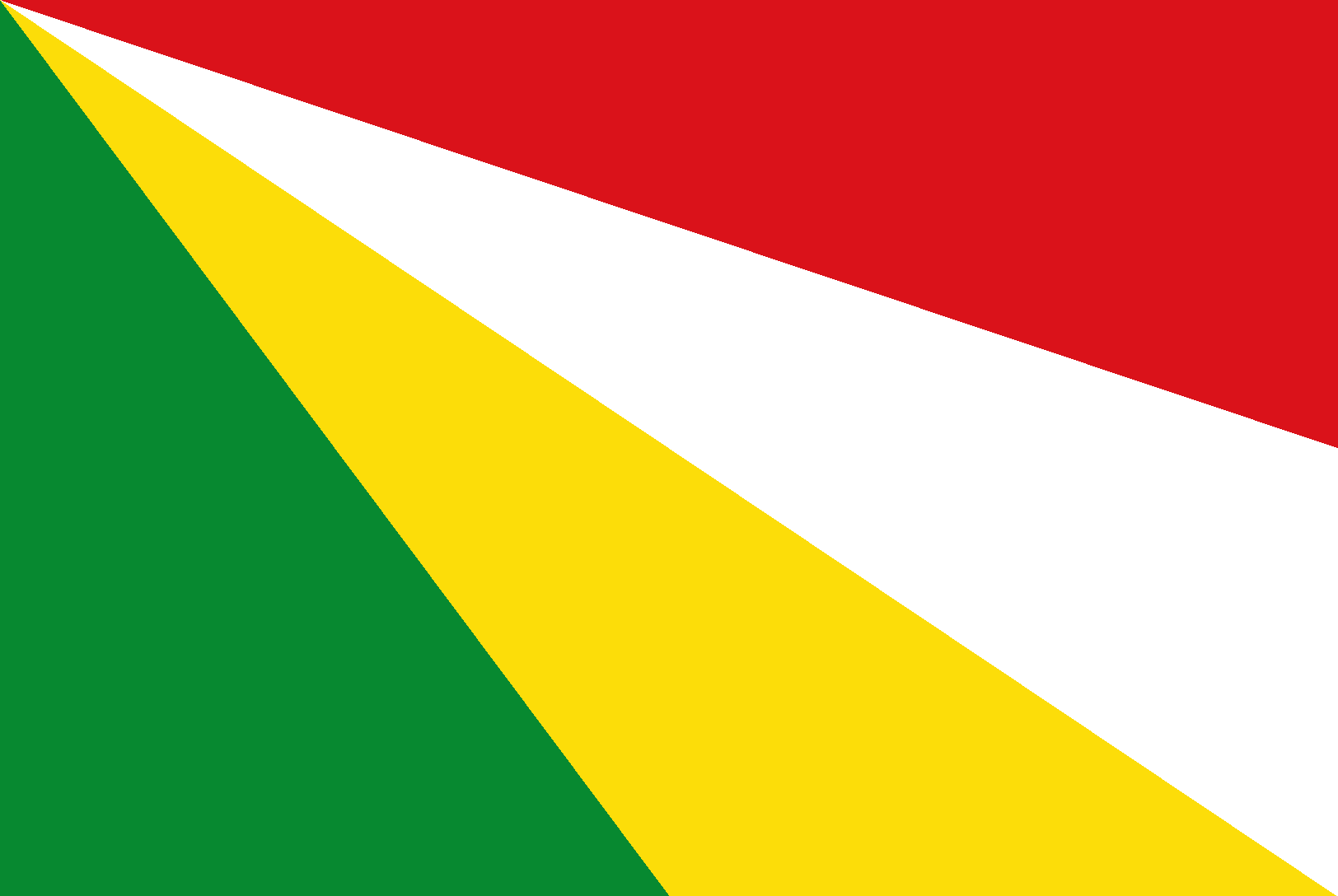
- Flag

- Location within Peru
- Coordinates: 14°06′50″S 72°42′54″W
- Country: Peru
- Region: Apurímac
- Province: Grau
- District: Chuquibambilla

Government
  - Mayor: Lilia Gallegos Cuéllar (2019–2022)
- Elevation: 3,320 m (10,890 ft)
- Time zone: UTC-5 (PET)

Chuquibambilla is a town in southern Peru, capital of Chuquibambilla District and Grau Province in the Department of Apurímac. The city is the seat of the Roman Catholic Territorial Prelature of Chuquibambilla.

== History ==
In 1928, the town was the site of hostile activity by abigeos against an individual named Pedro Palomino. The henchman (or "muchachos") of provincial deputy Alvarez Duran stole 8 cows and 69 horses from Palomino's estancia before decapitating Palomino's two sons. In order to have a court hear his case, Palomino had to drag the two heads with him as he went on a three-to-four day walk to Cusco, where he left the heads with the judge. On his way back, he found out that several henchmen were waiting for him at Chuquibambilla in order to kill him in the same way as his sons, and thus he had to turn back to Cusco and beg the judge to initiate proceedings because the justice system was too corrupt back home in Grau province.
