= Yuracjaja (Cusco) =

Mountain in Peru

- Location within Peru

Highest point
- Elevation: 4,600 m (15,100 ft)
- Coordinates: 13°34′35″S 71°14′23″W

Geography
- Location: Peru, Cusco Region
- Parent range: Andes, Vilcanota

Yuracjaja (possibly from Quechua yuraq white, qaqa rock, "white rock") is mountain in the northern extensions of the Vilcanota mountain range in the Andes of Peru, about 4,600 metres (15,092 ft) high. It is located in the Cusco Region, Quispicanchi Province, Ocongate District. Yuracjaja lies southwest of Jolljepunco and Cinajara where the annual Quyllur Rit'i festival takes place and southeast of Condorsenja and Jajachaca. Vilacirca is in the east beyond the Cinajara valley.
