= Condorsenja (Quispicanchi) =

Mountain in Peru

- Location within Peru

Highest point
- Elevation: 4,800 m (15,700 ft)
- Coordinates: 13°33′12″S 71°16′38″W

Geography
- Location: Peru, Cusco Region
- Parent range: Andes, Vilcanota

Condorsenja (possibly from Quechua kuntur condor, sinqa nose, "condor nose") is mountain in the northern extensions of the Vilcanota mountain range in the Andes of Peru, about 4,800 metres (15,748 ft) high. It is located in the Cusco Region, Quispicanchi Province, on the border of the districts of Ccarhuayo and Ocongate. The mountain lies southwest of Jolljepunco and Cinajara where the annual Quyllu Rit'i festival takes place. Yuracjaja and Jajachaca are southeast of Condorsenja.
