= Quechajaja =

Mountain in Peru

- Location within Peru

Highest point
- Elevation: 4,600 m (15,100 ft)
- Coordinates: 13°34′50″S 71°10′56″W

Geography
- Location: Peru, Cusco Region
- Parent range: Andes, Vilcanota

Quechajaja (possibly from Quechua kicha open, qaqa rock, "open rock") is mountain in the northern extensions of the Vilcanota mountain range in the Andes of Peru, about 4,600 metres (15,092 ft) high.

It is located in the Cusco Region, Quispicanchi Province, Ocongate District. Quechajaja lies south of Anta Punco and Jarjapata, southwest of Chuñuna and east of Vilacirca. It stretches along the Pampahuasi valley whose intermittent stream flows to Tinquimayo in the southwest. At the southern slope of Quechajaja there is a lake named Ampatune (possibly from Aymara for "the one with frogs").
