= Raymi =

Raymi may refer to:

- Ali Raymi, Yemeni boxer
- Inti Raymi, a religious ceremony of the Inca Empire
- Naoto Inti Raymi, Japanese singer-songwriter and composer
- Pachamama Raymi, a feast in Ecuador and Peru
- Pachamama Raymi (methodology), a methodology for rural development
- Qasim al-Raymi, Yemeni al-Qaeda militant
- T'anta Raymi, a feast in Peru
- Willka Raymi, a feast in Peru

== See also ==
- Raimi
