= Qullqi Cruz =

Qullqi Cruz (Aymara and Quechua qullqi silver, money, Spanish cruz cross, "silver cross", also spelled Ccolque Cruz, Colque Cruz, Colquecruz, Jolje Cruz, Qollqe Cruz) may refer to:

- Qullqi Cruz or Allqamarinayuq, a mountain in the Ocongate District, Quispicanchi Province, Cusco Region, Peru
- Qullqi Cruz or Qullqi, a mountain in the Marcapata District, Quispicanchi Province, Cusco Region, Peru
- Qullqi Cruz or Sawasiray, a mountain in the Calca Province, Cusco Region, Peru
