= Hualipayoc =

Mountain in Peru

- Location within Peru

Highest point
- Elevation: 5,600 m (18,400 ft)
- Coordinates: 13°41′3″S 71°7′33″W

Geography
- Location: Peru, Cusco Region, Quispicanchi Province
- Parent range: Andes, Vilcanota

Hualipayoc (possibly from Quechua wamanripa, a species of Senecio, -yuq a suffix) is a mountain in the Vilcanota mountain range in the Andes of Peru, about 5,600 metres (18,373 ft) high. It is situated in the Cusco Region, Quispicanchi Province, Ocongate District. Hualipayoc lies northwest of mount Alcamarinayoc and southeast of Lake Singrenacocha.
