= Jatun Pucacocha =

Lake in Peru

- Location within Peru
- Location: Peru; Cusco Region
- Coordinates: 13°48′40″S 71°16′12″W
- Max. length: 0.9 km (0.56 mi)
- Max. width: 0.58 km (0.36 mi)

Jatun Pucacocha (possibly from Quechua hatun (in Bolivia always jatun) big / superior / principal, puka red, qucha lake, "big red lake") is a lake in Peru located in the Cusco Region, Quispicanchi Province, Ocongate District. It is about 0.9 km long and 0.58 km at its widest point. Jatun Pucacocha lies southwest of the mountain Ausangate of the Vilcanota mountain range, between the lakes Uchuy Pucacocha ("little red lake") in the northwest and Pucacocha in the southeast.
