= Minasnioc (Cusco) =

Mountain in Peru

- Location within Peru

Highest point
- Elevation: 5,248 m (17,218 ft)
- Coordinates: 13°27′54″S 71°15′59″W

Geography
- Location: Peru, Cusco Region
- Parent range: Andes, Vilcanota

Minasnioc (Spanish minas mines, possibly from Quechua -ni, -yuq suffixes, "the one with mines") is a 5,248-metre-high (17,218 ft) mountain in the north of the Vilcanota mountain range in the Andes of Peru. It is situated in the Cusco Region, Quispicanchi Province, in the districts Ccarhuayo and Ocongate, and in the Paucartambo Province, Kosñipata District. Minasnioc lies southeast of the lake Minascocha and northwest of the mountains Cinajara and Jolljepunco where the annual Quyllur Rit'i festival takes place.
