= Comercocha (Ocongate) =

Lake in Peru

- Location within Peru
- Location: Peru; Cusco Region
- Coordinates: 13°44′27″S 71°12′47″W

Comercocha (possibly from in the Quechua spelling Q'umirqucha, q'umir green, qucha lake, "green lake") is a lake in Peru located in the Cusco Region, Quispicanchi Province, Ocongate District. Comercocha lies southwest of the mountain Callangate of the Vilcanota mountain range.
