= Anta Punco =

Mountain in Peru near Cusco

- Location within Peru

Highest point
- Elevation: 5,000 m (16,000 ft)
- Coordinates: 13°33′02″S 71°12′07″W

Geography
- Location: Peru, Cusco Region
- Parent range: Andes, Vilcanota

Anta Punco (possibly from Quechua anta copper, p'unqu pond, reservoir, tank; dam, "copper pond") is mountain in the northern extensions of the Vilcanota mountain range in the Andes of Peru, about 5,000 metres (16,404 ft) high. It is located in the Cusco Region, Quispicanchi Province, Ocongate District. Anta Punco lies west of Jarjapata and southeast of Jolljepunco where the annual Quyllur Rit'i festival takes place.
