= Lake Armaccocha =

Lake in Cusco, Peru

- Location within Peru
- Location: Peru; Cusco Region, Quispicanchi Province
- Coordinates: 13°41′39″S 71°11′14″W

Lake Armaccocha (possibly from Quechua arma bath / plough, qucha lake) is a lake in the Vilcanota mountain range in Peru. It is situated in the Cusco Region, Quispicanchi Province, Ocongate District. Lake Armaccocha lies south-west of Lake Singrenacocha and north-west of Mount Callangate.
