= Pukaqucha =

Pukaqucha (Quechua: puka red, qucha lake, "red lake", also spelled Puca Ccocha, Puca Jocha, Puca Khocha, Puca Qocha, Puca Q'ocha, Pucaccocha, Pucacocha, Pucajocha) may refer to:

== Lakes ==
- Pukaqucha (Ayacucho), in the Ayacucho Region, Peru
- Pukaqucha (Huaylas), in the Huaylas Province, Ancash Region, Peru
- Pukaqucha (Lima), in the Lima Region, Peru
- Pukaqucha (Ocongate), in the Cusco Region, Peru
- Pukaqucha (Puno), in the Puno Region, Peru

== Mountains ==
- Pukaqucha (Ancash), in the Ancash Region, Peru
- Pukaqucha (Calca), in the Calca District, Calca Province, Cusco Region, Peru
- Pukaqucha (Junín-Lima), a mountain near a little lake of that name on the border of the Junín Region and the Lima Region, Peru
- Pukaqucha (Lares), in the Lares District, Calca Province, Cusco Region, Peru
- Pukaqucha (Marcapata), in the Marcapata District, Quispicanchi Province, Cusco Region, Peru
