= Huiscachani (Marcapata-Ocongate) =

Mountain in Peru

- Location within Peru

Highest point
- Elevation: 6,000 m (20,000 ft)
- Coordinates: 13°42′38″S 71°04′48″W

Geography
- Location: Peru, Cusco Region, Quispicanchi Province, Marcapata District, Ocongate District
- Parent range: Andes, Vilcanota

Huiscachani (possibly from Aymara wisk'acha viscacha, -ni a suffix to indicate ownership, "the one with a viscacha (or viscachas)") is a mountain in the Vilcanota mountain range in the Andes of Peru, about 6,000 m (20,000 ft) high. It is situated in the Cusco Region, Quispicanchi Province, on the border of the districts of Marcapata and Ocongate. Wisk'achani lies north of Chumpe and southeast of Alcamarinayoc.
