= Waqwaqucha =

Lake in Peru

- Location within Peru
- Location: Peru; Cusco Region
- Coordinates: 13°51′04″S 71°37′04″W

Waqwaqucha (Quechua waqwa, waqu, mayu sunsu black-crowned night heron (Nycticorax nycticorax hoacli gmel), qucha lake, "night heron lake", hispanicized spellings Huajhuacocha, Huaj Huacocha) is a lake in Peru located in the Cusco Region, Quispicanchi Province, Quiquijana District. Waqwaqucha is situated about 10 km northeast of the town Acomayo near the villages Waqwapata (Huaj Huapata) and Qucha K'uchu (Cocha Cucho).
