= Anka Wachana (disambiguation) =

Anka Wachana (Quechua anka eagle, wacha birth, to give birth, -na a suffix, "where the eagle is born", Hispanicized spelling Ancahuachana), Anka Wachanan or Ankap Wachanan (-n, -p suffixes, Hispanicized Ancahuachanan, Ancapuachana, Ancapuachanan) may refer to:

- Anka Wachana (Chumbivilcas), a mountain in the Chumbivilcas Province, Cusco Region, Peru
- Anka Wachana (Quispicanchi), a mountain in the districts of Camanti and Marcapata, Quispicanchi Province, Cusco Region, Peru
- Anka Wachanan, a mountain in the Ocongate District, Quispicanchi Province, Cusco Region, Peru
- Ankap Wachanan, a lake in the Junín Region, Peru
