= Jatun Alfapata =

Mountain in the Peruvian Andes

- Location within Peru

Highest point
- Elevation: 5,390 m (17,680 ft)
- Coordinates: 13°31′24″S 71°10′03″W

Geography
- Location: Peru, Cusco Region
- Parent range: Andes, Vilcanota

Jatun Alfapata or Jatun Allpapata (possibly from Quechua hatun big, allpa earth, pata step, bank of a river, "big earth step" or "big earth bank") is 5,390-metre-high (17,684 ft) mountain in the Andes of Peru. It is located in the Cusco Region, Paucartambo Province, Kosñipata District, and in the Quispicanchi Province, in the districts of Marcapata and Ocongate. It lies in the Ayakachi group, the northern extension of the Vilcanota mountain range. Jatun Alfapata is situated northwest of Velacota and east of Jolljepunco.
