= Mullucocha (Cusco) =

Mountain in Peru

- Location within Peru

Highest point
- Elevation: 5,400 m (17,700 ft)
- Coordinates: 13°42′07″S 71°09′19″W

Geography
- Location: Peru, Cusco Region
- Parent range: Andes, Vilcanota

Mullucocha (possibly from Quechua mullu small perl made of fine clay / marine shell which is offered to the divinities, qucha lake, lagoon) is a mountain in the Vilcanota mountain range in the Andes of Peru, about 5,400 metres (17,717 ft) high. It is situated in the Cusco Region, Quispicanchi Province, Ocongate District. Mullucocha lies north of the mountain Callangate. There is a group of lakes northeast of Mullucocha, among them Alcacocha ("black-and-white lake"), Pucacocha ("red lake") and Yanacocha ("black lake").
