= Huillolluni =

Mountain in Peru near Cusco

- Location within Peru

Highest point
- Elevation: 5,000 m (16,000 ft)
- Coordinates: 13°29′51″S 71°09′37″W

Geography
- Location: Peru, Cusco Region
- Parent range: Andes, Vilcanota

Huillolluni (possibly from Aymara and Quechua willullu poor / orphan, Aymara -ni a suffix to indicate ownership, "the one with an orphan") is a mountain in the Vilcanota mountain range in the Andes of Peru, about 5,000 metres (16,404 ft) high. It is situated in the Cusco Region, Quispicanchi Province, Marcapata District, and in the Paucartambo Province, Kosñipata District. Huillolluni lies north-east of the mountain Jolljepunco and north-west of the mountain Ancahuachana.
