= Ancahuachanan =

Mountain in Peru

- Location within Peru

Highest point
- Elevation: 5,100 m (16,700 ft)
- Coordinates: 13°41′02″S 71°06′37″W

Geography
- Location: Peru, Cusco Region, Quispicanchi Province, Ocongate District
- Parent range: Andes, Vilcanota

Ancahuachanan (possibly from Quechua anka black-chested buzzard-eagle or eagle, wacha birth, to give birth -na, -n suffixes, "where the eagle is born") is a mountain in the Vilcanota mountain range in the Andes of Peru, about 5,100 m (16,700 ft) high. It is situated in the Cusco Region, Quispicanchi Province, Ocongate District. Ancahuachanan lies northwest of Alcamarinayoc and east of Singrenacocha.
