= Jajachaca =

Mountain in Peru

- Location within Peru

Highest point
- Elevation: 4,800 m (15,700 ft)
- Coordinates: 13°34′01″S 71°14′51″W

Geography
- Location: Peru, Cusco Region
- Parent range: Andes, Vilcanota

Jajachaca (possibly from Quechua qaqa rock, chaka bridge, "rock bridge") is mountain in the northern extensions of the Vilcanota mountain range in the Andes of Peru, about 4,800 metres (15,748 ft) high. It is located in the Cusco Region, Quispicanchi Province, Ocongate District. Jajachaca lies southwest of Jolljepunco and Cinajara where the annual Quyllur Rit'i festival takes place.
