= Chuñuna =

Mountain in Peru

- Location within Peru

Highest point
- Elevation: 5,100 m (16,700 ft)
- Coordinates: 13°33′39″S 71°08′54″W

Geography
- Location: Peru, Cusco Region, Quispicanchi Province
- Parent range: Andes, Vilcanota

Chuñuna (possibly from Quechua ch'uñu a freeze-dried potato, -na a suffix, "where ch'uñu is made") is mountain in the Vilcanota mountain range in the Andes of Peru, about 5,100 metres (16,732 ft) high. It is located in the Cusco Region, Quispicanchi Province, on the border of the districts of Marcapata and Ocongate. Chuñuna lies southwest of Ancahuachana and southeast of Jolljepunco and Velacota.
