= Jatun Punta =

Mountain in Peru

- Location within Peru

Highest point
- Elevation: 5,200 m (17,100 ft)
- Coordinates: 13°45′08″S 71°11′14″W

Geography
- Location: Peru, Cusco Region
- Parent range: Andes, Vilcanota

Jatun Punta (possibly from Quechua hatun (in Bolivia jatun) big, punta peak; ridge; first, before, in front of,) is a mountain in the Vilcanota mountain range in the Andes of Peru, about 5,200 metres (17,060 ft) high. It is situated in the Cusco Region, Quispicanchi Province, Ocongate District. Jatun Punta lies southwest of Callangate and west Puca Punta.
