= Ausangate =

Mountain in the Andes of Peru

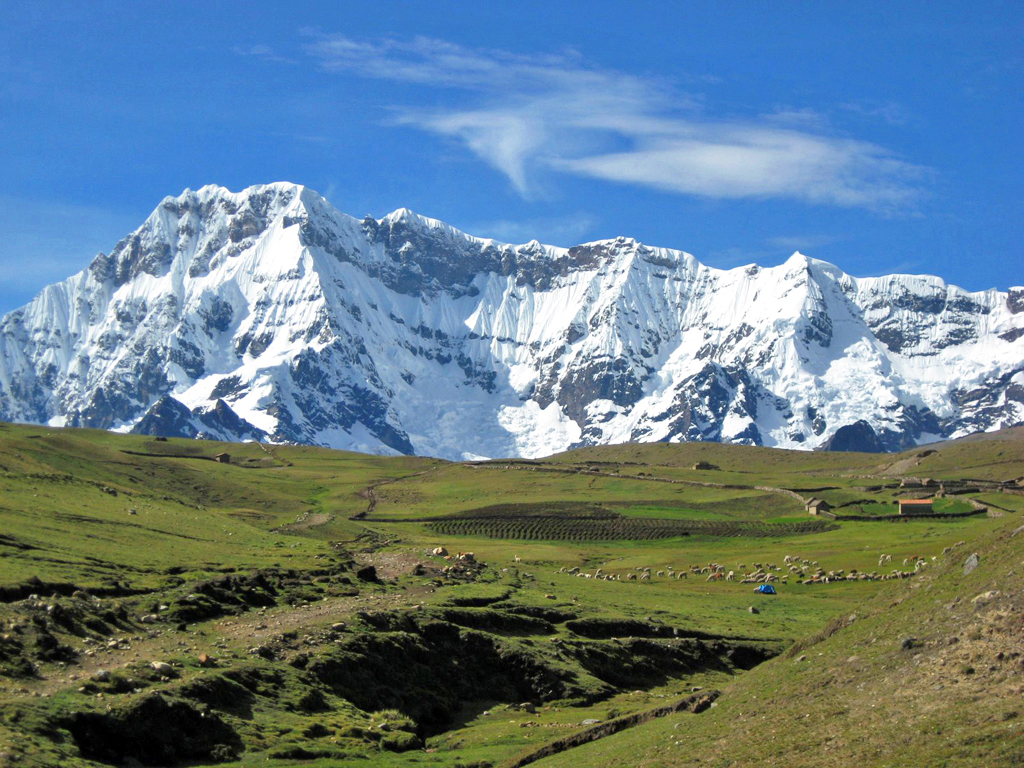
- The western face of Ausangate Mountain

Highest point
- Elevation: 6,384 m (20,945 ft)
- Prominence: 2,085 m (6,841 ft)
- Coordinates: 13°47′19″S 71°13′52″W

Geography
- Location within Peru
- Location: Cusco Region, Peru
- Parent range: Andes, Vilcanota mountain range

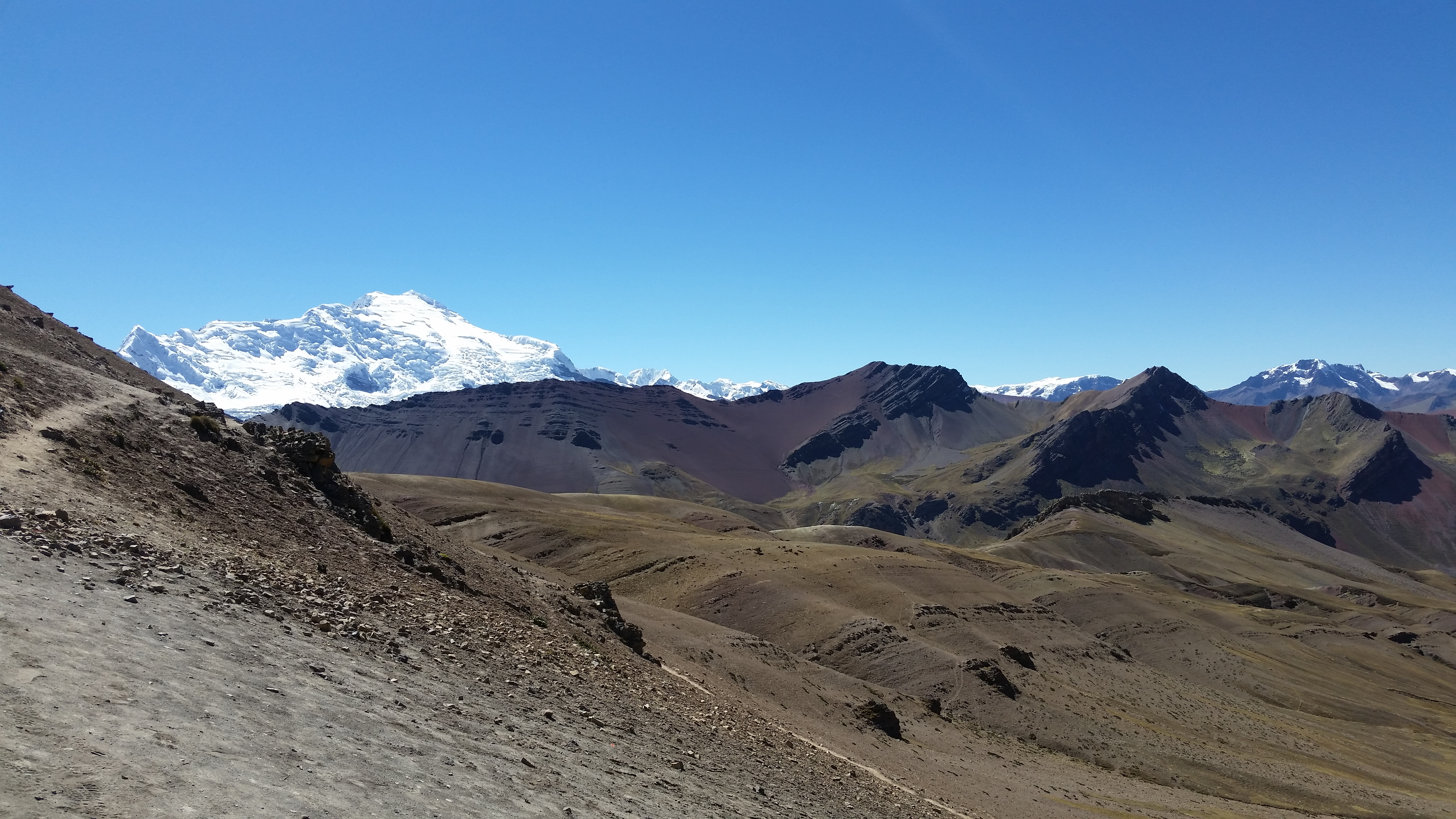
Ausangate as seen from Vinicunca

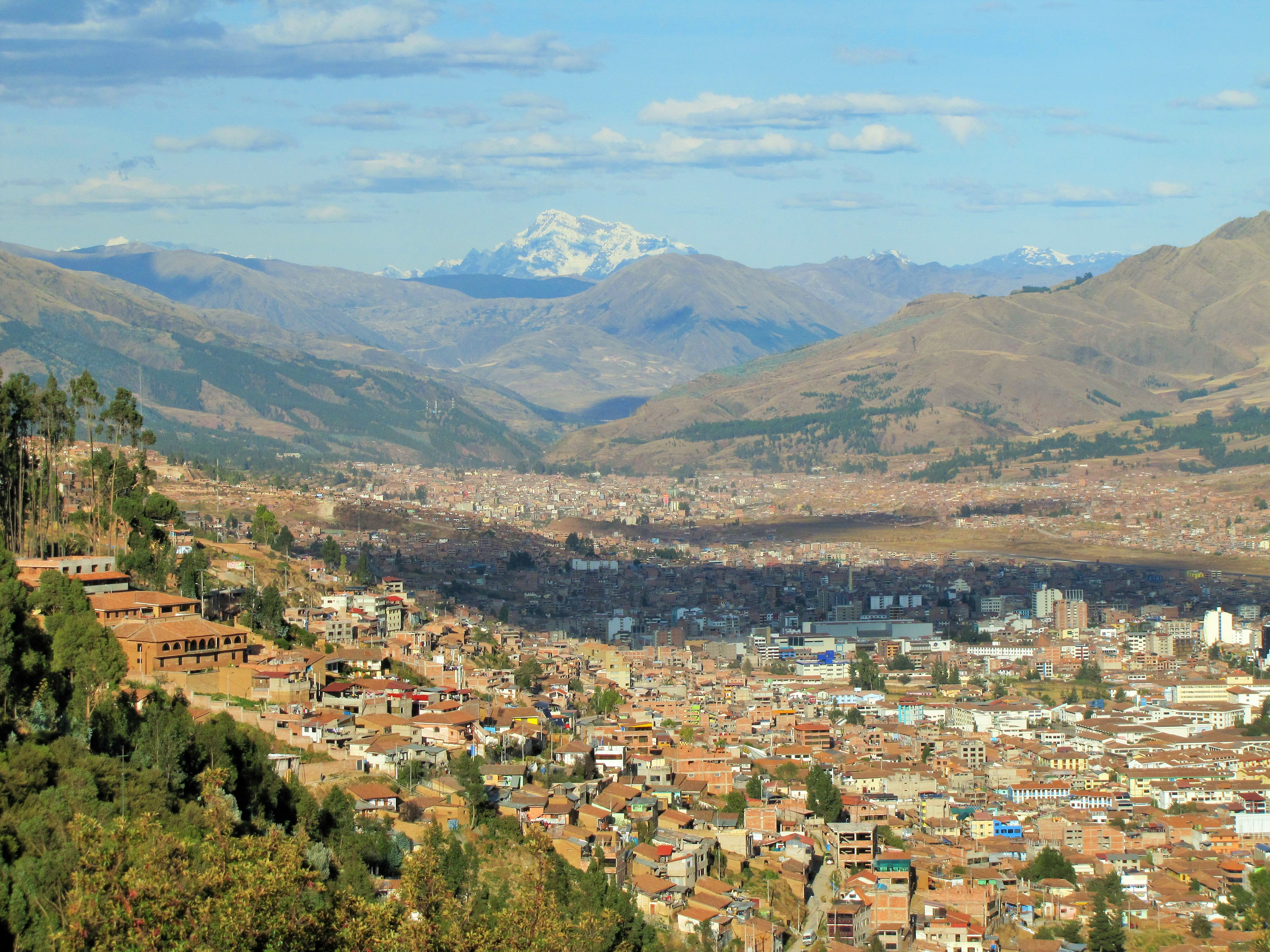
Ausangate as seen from Cusco

Ausangate or Auzangate (in Hispanicized spellings) is a mountain of the Vilcanota mountain range in the Andes of Peru. With an elevation of 6,384 metres, it is situated around 100 kilometres southeast of Cusco in the Cusco Region, Canchis Province, Pitumarca District, and in the Quispicanchi Province, Ocongate District.

The mountain has significance in Incan mythology.

Every year the Quyllur Rit'i (Quechua for "star snow") festival which attracts thousands of Quechua pilgrims is celebrated about 20 km north of the Ausangate at the mountain Qullqipunku. It takes place one week before the Corpus Christi feast.

The region is inhabited by llama and alpaca herding communities, and constitutes one of the few remaining pastoralist societies in the world. High mountain trails are used by these herders to trade with agricultural communities at lower elevations. Currently, one of these trails, "the road of the Apu Ausangate", is one of the most renowned treks in Peru.

The area has four major geological features, the Andean uplift formed by Granits, the hanging glaciers and glacial erosional valleys, the Permian formation with its singular colors: red, ochre, and turquoise and the Cretaceous, limestone forests.

== Archaeological sites on the Ausangate and Vinicunca Route ==
- Colonial Bridge of Checacupe
- Colonial Temple of Checacupe
- Siwinaqocha
- Laguna Ausangate
- Ananiso Canyon
- Rock Climbing - Huayllasqa
- Uchullucllo Thermal Baths

== Climbing activity ==
The north face of Ausangate was first climbed in 2023 by Japanese climbers Yudai Suzuki and Kei Narita. The north face is easily seen from the last small village Pacchanta/Pajchanta, 8 kilometres north of the summit. The normal route is located at opposite side (south face) of the mountain; however, only 0 to 4 teams successfully climb that route each year.

== Myths and Legends of the Ausangate Mountain ==
Protagonist of legends told through generations since the Inca Empire, the nevado is still venerated as a divinity (called apu) by the inhabitants of its surroundings.

Myths from the Quechua village of Kauri collected in 1938 say that the supreme local apu – guardian spirit – resided on Ausangate mountain, from where he protected the local llamas, alpacas and vicuñas. He was master of the Ccoa - a feline creature as big as a puma with broad stripes on its black, which was notorious for stealing the first fruits from the fields, then destroying the remainder by lightning bolts.

Ausangate is usually considered to be the highest being in the apu hierarchy of the Cusco Region.

== Gallery ==
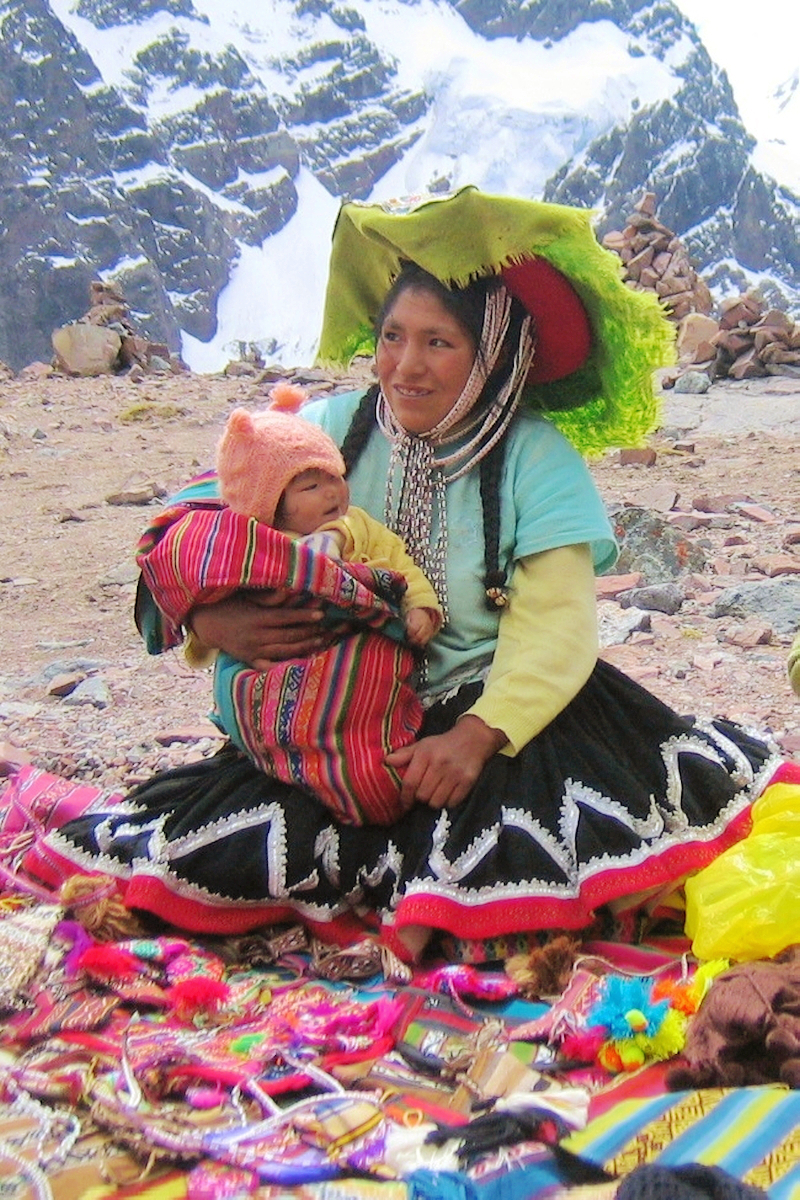
Handicraft seller in Ausangate, near Jampa Pass

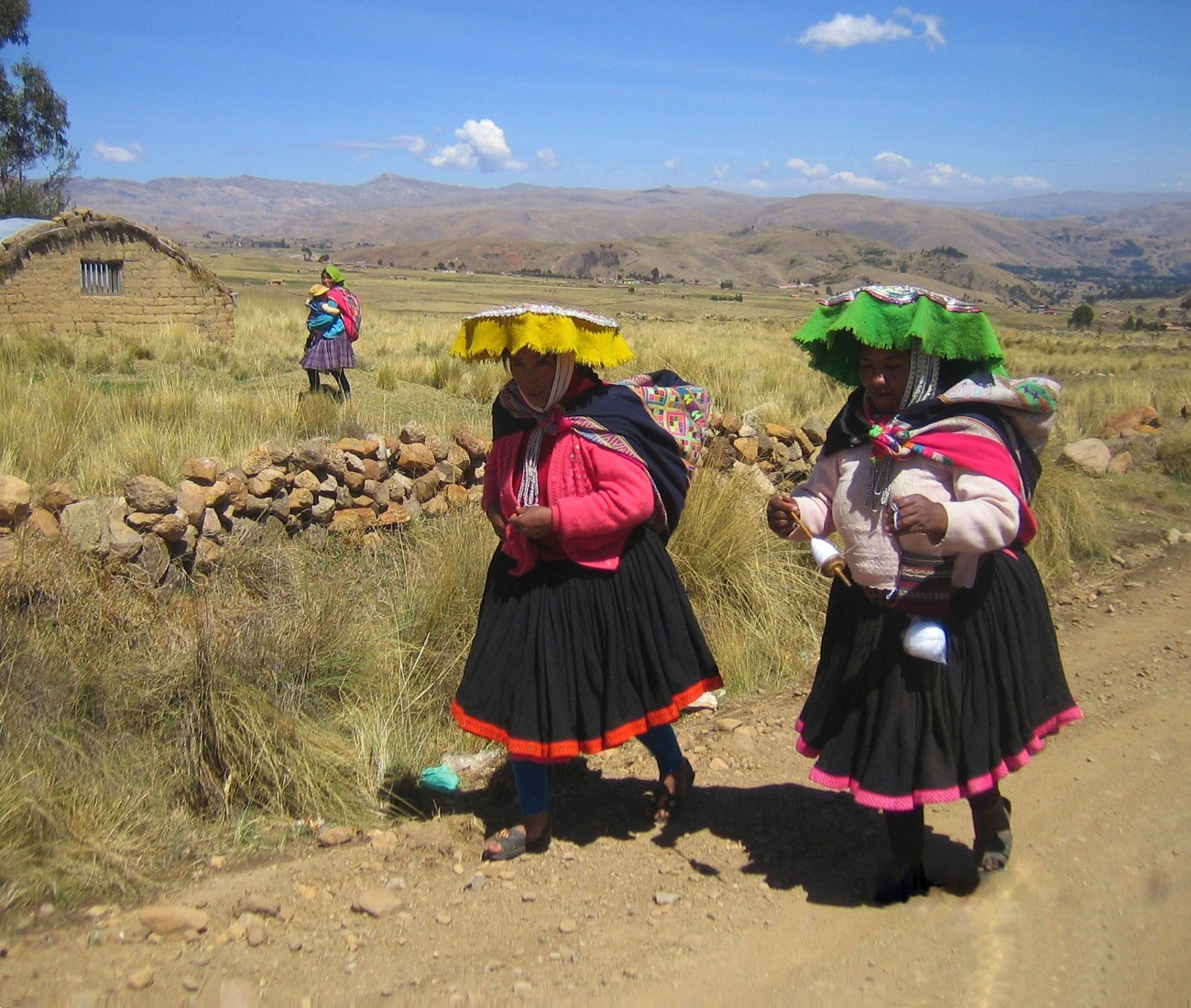
Women of Ausangate, near Tinki village

== See also ==
- Jatun Pucacocha
