= Tiklla Q'asa =

Mountain in Peru

- Location within Peru

Highest point
- Elevation: 4,800 m (15,700 ft)
- Coordinates: 13°54′41″S 71°23′07″W

Geography
- Location: Peru, Cusco Region, Canchis Province, Quispicanchi Province
- Parent range: Andes

Tiklla Q'asa (Quechua tiklla two-colored, qucha lake, lagoon, "two-colored mountain pass", Hispanicized spelling Ticllajasa) is a mountain in the Andes of Peru, about 4,800 metres (15,748 ft) high. It is situated in the Cusco Region, Canchis Province, Pitumarca District, and in the Quispicanchi Province, Cusipata District. Tiklla Q'asa lies southwest of Ch'aqu and Yuraq Q'asa and southeast of Tuqtu and Hatun Ch'aqu.

An intermittent stream originates west of Tiklla Q'asa. Its waters flow to the Ch'illkamayu in the south. The Ch'illkamayu is a right tributary of the Willkanuta River.
