= Pirhuane (Cusco) =

Mountain in Peru

- Location within Peru

Highest point
- Elevation: 4,800 m (15,700 ft)
- Coordinates: 13°37′28″S 71°06′46″W

Geography
- Location: Peru, Cusco Region
- Parent range: Andes, Vilcanota

Pirhuane (possibly from Aymara pirwa, piwra granary, -ni a suffix to indicate ownership, "the one with a granary") is a mountain in the northern extensions of the Vilcanota mountain range in the Andes of Peru, about 4,800 metres (15,748 ft) high. It is situated in the Cusco Region, Quispicanchi Province, Ocongate District. Pirhuane lies northeast of the lake named Singrenacocha, between the Ayacachi group in the north and the main range in the south.
