= Puca Punta (mountain) =

Mountain in Peru

Puka Punta
- Location within Peru

Highest point
- Elevation: 5,600 m (18,400 ft)
- Coordinates: 13°45′20″S 71°10′19″W

Geography
- Location: Peru, Cusco Region
- Parent range: Andes, Vilcanota

Puca Punta (possibly from Quechua puka red, punta peak; ridge, "red peak (or ridge)") is a mountain in the Vilcanota mountain range in the Andes of Peru, about 5,600 metres (18,373 ft) high. It is located in the Cusco Region, Canchis Province, Pitumarca District, and in the Quispicanchi Province, Ocongate District. Puka Punta lies southwest of Callangate, northeast of Yanajaja and east of Jatun Punta.
