= Queullacocha (Cusco) =

Mountain in Peru

- Location within Peru

Highest point
- Elevation: 4,900 m (16,100 ft)
- Coordinates: 13°45′55″S 71°17′1″W

Geography
- Location: Peru, Puno Region
- Parent range: Andes, Vilcanota

Queullacocha (possibly from Quechua qillwa, qiwlla, qiwiña gull, qucha lake, "gull lake") is a mountain in the Vilcanota mountain range in the Andes of Peru, about 4,900 metres (16,076 ft) high. It is located in the Cusco Region, Quispicanchi Province, Ocongate District. Queullacocha lies northwest of the mountain Ausangate.
