= Jarjapata =

Mountain in Peru

- Location within Peru

Highest point
- Elevation: 5,100 m (16,700 ft)
- Coordinates: 13°33′25″S 71°10′58″W

Geography
- Location: Peru, Cusco Region
- Parent range: Andes, Vilcanota

Jarjapata (possibly from Aymara k'ark'a crevice, fissure, crack, pata step) is mountain in the Vilcanota mountain range in the Andes of Peru, about 5,100 metres (16,732 ft) high. It is located in the Cusco Region, Quispicanchi Province, Ocongate District. Jarjapata lies at the Pacopampa valley southwest of Velacota, northwest of Chuñuna and southeast of Jolljepunco.
