= Yana Urqu (Ocongate-Quiquijana) =

Mountain in Peru

- Location within Peru

Highest point
- Elevation: 4,644.8 m (15,239 ft)
- Coordinates: 13°45′52″S 71°27′2″W

Naming
- Language of name: Quechua

Geography
- Location: Peru, Cusco Region, Quispicanchi Province
- Parent range: Andes

Yana Urqu (Quechua yana, black, urqu mountain, "black mountain", Hispanicized spelling Yana Orjo, erroneously also Yana Orja) is a mountain in the Cusco Region in Peru, about 4,644.8 metres (15,239 ft) high. It is situated in the Quispicanchi Province, at the border of the districts Ocongate and Quiquijana.

An intermittent stream originates south of Yana Urqu. It flows through the Ninapampa (Ninabamba) or Qunchupata (Cunchopata) valley to reach the river Huch'uymayu (Quechua for "little river", Uchuymayu). Huch'uymayu is a right tributary of the Willkanuta River. The confluence is north of Quiquijana.
