= Quri (Quiquijana) =

Mountain in Peru

- Location within Peru

Highest point
- Elevation: 4,200 m (13,800 ft)
- Coordinates: 13°50′9″S 71°31′7″W

Naming
- Language of name: Quechua

Geography
- Location: Peru, Cusco Region, Quispicanchi Province
- Parent range: Andes

Quri (Quechua for gold, Hispanicized spelling Curi) is a mountain in the Cusco Region in Peru, about 4,200 metres (13,780 ft) high. It is situated in the Quispicanchi Province, Quiquijana District. The mountain lies at the confluence of the Willkanuta River and its right tributary Uchuymayu (Quechua for "little river") in Quiquijana.
