= Ccolcce (Cusco) =

Mountain in Peru

- Qullqi Cruz
- Location within Peru

Highest point
- Elevation: 5,400 m (17,700 ft)
- Coordinates: 13°42′50″S 70°54′18″W

Naming
- Language of name: Aymara

Geography
- Location: Peru
- Parent range: Andes, Willkanuta

Ccolcce (possibly from Aymara and Quechua for silver, money) or Jolje Cruz (Spanish cruz cross, "silver cross") is a mountain in the Vilcanota mountain range in the Andes of Peru, about 5,400 metres (17,717 ft) high. It is located in the Marcapata District, Quispicanchi Province in the Cusco Region. Ccolcce lies north to northwest of Yanajasa and Kiswarniyuq. It is situated between the rivers Sayapata and Cajamayu (possibly from Quechua for "rock river"). They flow to the Arasa River (Araza) in the north.
