= Hatun Ch'aqu =

Mountain in Peru

- Location within Peru

Highest point
- Elevation: 5,000 m (16,000 ft)
- Coordinates: 13°53′49″S 71°24′30″W

Geography
- Location: Peru, Cusco Region
- Parent range: Andes

Hatun Ch'aqu (Quechua hatun big, ch'aqu a fine, whitish, edible and medicinal clay, Hispanicized spelling Jatunchajo) is a mountain in the Andes of Peru, about 5,000 metres (16,404 ft) high. It is located in the Cusco Region, Canchis Province, Pitumarca District, and in the Quispicanchi Province, Cusipata District. It lies south-west of the mountain Ch'aqu, west of the mountain Yanaqaqa ("black rock", Yanajaja), north-west of the mountain Tiklla Q'asa and north of the mountain Tuqtu. Its ridge stretches to the north-west.

Hatun Ch'aqu is situated south of the river Pukamayu ("red river", Pucamayu) which flows to the west as a right affluent of the Willkanuta River. An intermittent stream originates east of the mountains Hatun Ch'aqu and Tuqtu. Its waters flow to the river Ch'illkamayu in the south. Ch'illkamayu is also a right tributary of the Willkanuta River.
