= Yanajasa =

Mountain in Peru

- Location within Peru

Highest point
- Elevation: 5,200 m (17,100 ft)
- Coordinates: 13°45′40″S 70°53′42″W

Geography
- Location: Peru, Cusco Region
- Parent range: Andes, Vilcanota mountain range

Yanajasa (possibly from Quechua yana black, q'asa mountain pass) is a mountain in the Vilcanota mountain range in the Andes of Peru, about 5,200 metres (17,060 ft) high. It is located in the Cusco Region, Quispicanchi Province, Marcapata District. Yanajasa lies south of Ccolcce and Quishuarnioj between the Parina valley and the Sayapata valley.
