= Quevesere =

Mountain in Peru

- Location within Peru

Highest point
- Elevation: 5,700 m (18,700 ft)
- Coordinates: 13°43′21″S 71°05′46″W

Geography
- Location: Peru, Cusco Region
- Parent range: Andes, Vilcanota

Quevesere (possibly from Aymara q'iwisiña to fight, -ri a suffix, "fighter") is a mountain in the Vilcanota mountain range in the Andes of Peru, about 5,700 metres (18,701 ft) high. It is located in the Cusco Region, Quispicanchi Province, Ocongate District. It lies south of the peak of Alcamarinayoc and northwest of Chumpe.
