= Pachamama Raymi (methodology) =

Pachamama Raymi refers to a methodology for rural development. It was developed in 1988 in Cusco, Peru.

== Use ==
It is being used in many projects in Latin America and most recently in Europe. In extremely poor rural areas, extreme poverty and environmental degradation are often closely linked. Computer simulations have shown that natural resources can be reclaimed and poverty overcome, if a majority of the population changes management of their natural resources. At the same time, poor preventive health habits generate severe and generalized health problems. Changing preventive health practices greatly improves people's health.

The methodology Pachamama Raymi makes it possible to introduce the required innovations in natural resource management and in preventive health practices simultaneously in a great majority of large populations within three to four years, mobilizing the population to get out of poverty largely through their own means.

The methodology uses systemic social management, reinforcing people's cultural identity, families, communities and working in close cooperation with their local government. Projects that use the Pachamama Raymi methodology invest their resources in peer learning and motivation. The methodology uses contests between families of every village and between the villages of the district with attractive (cash) prizes. The participants in the contests compete in the quality of adoption of the innovations that the project seeks to introduce. Rules and Regulations are used. The contests typically lasts six months. About five to eight successive contests are required to achieve sustainable results. The contests create a festive spirit in the villages.

== Publications of the methodology Pachamama Raymi ==
- Willem H. M. Van Immerzeel, Juan V. Núñez del Prado (28 October 2007). "Pacha Mama Raymi: Un Sistema De Capacitacion Para El Desarrollo En Comunidades" (PDF). Archived from the original (PDF) on 12 August 2014.
- Marco Zeisser Polatsik, Teresa Tupayachi Mar. "Estudio de impacto de la acción de Pachamama Raymi en el distrito de Ccarhuayo, provincia de Quispicanchi – Cusco". Archived from the original on 2014-08-12.
- "Pachamama Raymi – aprender de los mejores". pachamamaraymi.org.

== See also ==
- Lugnasad
