= Cusipata District =

Coordinates: 13.9036°S 71.5027°W

Cusipata Kusipata
- District
- Interactive map of Cusipata; Kusipata
- Country: Peru
- Region: Cusco
- Province: Quispicanchi
- Founded: September 5, 1940
- Capital: Cusipata

Government
  - Mayor: Felipe Cornejo Cusihuaman

Area
  - Total: 248.03 km^{2} (95.76 sq mi)
- Elevation: 3,310 m (10,860 ft)

Population (2005 census)
  - Total: 4,444
  - Density: 17.92/km^{2} (46.41/sq mi)
- Time zone: UTC-5 (PET)
- UBIGEO: 081206

The Cusipata District is one of the twelve districts in the Quispicanchi Province in Peru. Created by Law No. 9164 on September 5, 1940, its capital is the town of Cusipata.

== Geography ==
The most important river of the district is the Willkanuta which crosses the district from south-east to north-west.

== Ethnic groups ==
The people in the district are mainly indigenous citizens of Quechua descent. Quechua is the language which the majority of the population (81.67%) learnt to speak in childhood, 18.07% of the residents started speaking using the Spanish language (2007 Peru Census).

== See also ==
- Chachakumayuq
- Ch'aqu
- Hatun Ch'aqu
- Hatun Rit'iyuq
- Tiklla Q'asa
- Tuqtu
- Wasaqucha
- Yuraq Q'asa
