= Ccatca District =

Coordinates: 13.6344°S 71.5290°W

Ccatca
- District
- Interactive map of Ccatca
- Country: Peru
- Region: Cusco
- Province: Quispicanchi
- Capital: Ccatca

Government
  - Mayor: Pedro Illanes Páucar

Area
  - Total: 307.72 km^{2} (118.81 sq mi)
- Elevation: 3,675 m (12,057 ft)

Population (2005 census)
  - Total: 13,841
  - Density: 44.979/km^{2} (116.50/sq mi)
- Time zone: UTC-5 (PET)
- UBIGEO: 081205

The Ccatca District is one of the twelve districts in the Quispicanchi Province in Peru. Its capital is the town of Ccatca.

== Geography ==
One of the highest peaks of the district is Luychu Urqu at 4,430 m (14,530 ft). Other mountains are listed below:

- Antay Marka
- Inti Qhawarina
- Kuntur Sinqa
- Luychu Muqu
- Misa Pata
- Pukara
- Qinqu Rumiyuq
- Qullpa Tira
- Saksay Waman
- Takina Urqu
- Tinki Muqu
- T'uquyuq
- Uturunku
- Wisk'achani
- Yuraq Kancha
- Yuraq Unuyuq

== Ethnic groups ==
The people in the district are mainly indigenous citizens of Quechua descent. Quechua is the language which the majority of the population (94.64%) learnt to speak in childhood, 5.00% of the residents started speaking using the Spanish language (2007 Peru Census).

== Climate ==
Climate data for Ccatca, elevation 3,681 m (12,077 ft), (1991–2020)
Month	Jan	Feb	Mar	Apr	May	Jun	Jul	Aug	Sep	Oct	Nov	Dec	Year
Mean daily maximum °C (°F)	14.6 (58.3)	14.4 (57.9)	14.5 (58.1)	15.2 (59.4)	16.1 (61.0)	15.7 (60.3)	15.3 (59.5)	15.6 (60.1)	15.7 (60.3)	16.1 (61.0)	16.3 (61.3)	15.3 (59.5)	15.4 (59.7)
Mean daily minimum °C (°F)	4.2 (39.6)	4.2 (39.6)	3.9 (39.0)	2.4 (36.3)	−0.5 (31.1)	−2.1 (28.2)	−2.7 (27.1)	−1.5 (29.3)	0.9 (33.6)	2.7 (36.9)	3.4 (38.1)	3.9 (39.0)	1.6 (34.8)
Average precipitation mm (inches)	131.8 (5.19)	134.8 (5.31)	105.6 (4.16)	29.8 (1.17)	6.7 (0.26)	6.1 (0.24)	6.0 (0.24)	10.0 (0.39)	14.3 (0.56)	42.2 (1.66)	64.9 (2.56)	114.3 (4.50)	666.5 (26.24)
Source: National Meteorology and Hydrology Service of Peru

== See also ==
- Pachamama Raymi
