= Tuqtu (Canchis-Quispicanchi) =

Mountain in Peru

- Location within Peru

Highest point
- Elevation: 5,000 m (16,000 ft)
- Coordinates: 13°54′06″S 71°24′45″W

Geography
- Location: Peru, Cusco Region, Canchis Province, Quispicanchi Province
- Parent range: Andes

Tuqtu (Quechua for "broody hen", also spelled Tucto) is a mountain in the Andes of Peru, about 5,000 metres (16,404 ft) high. It is situated in the Cusco Region, Canchis Province, Pitumarca District, and in the Quispicanchi Province, Cusipata District. Tuqtu lies northwest of Tiklla Q'asa, near Hatun Ch'aqu, south of it.

An intermittent stream originates east of Hatun Ch'aqu and Tuqtu. Its waters flow to the Ch'illkamayu in the south. The Ch'illkamayu is a right tributary of the Willkanuta River.
