= Vilacirca (Peru) =

Mountain in Peru

- Location within Peru

Highest point
- Elevation: 4,800 m (15,700 ft)
- Coordinates: 13°35′00″S 71°13′02″W

Geography
- Location: Peru, Cusco Region
- Parent range: Andes, Vilcanota

Vilacirca (possibly from Aymara wila blood, blood-red, sirka vein of the body or a mine, "red vein") is mountain in the northern extensions of the Vilcanota mountain range in the Andes of Peru, about 4,800 metres (15,748 ft) high. It is located in the Cusco Region, Quispicanchi Province, Ocongate District. Vilacirca lies south of Jolljepunco where the annual Quyllur Rit'i festival takes place.
