= Pinchimuru =

Mountain in Peru

- Location within Peru

Highest point
- Elevation: 4,098 m (13,445 ft)
- Coordinates: 13°34′52″S 71°27′20″W

Naming
- Language of name: Quechua

Geography
- Location: Peru, Cusco Region, Quispicanchi Province
- Parent range: Andes

Pinchimuru (Quechua, Hispanicized spelling Pinchimuro) is a mountain in the Cusco Region in Peru, about 4,098 metres (13,445 ft) high. It is situated in the Quispicanchi Province, Ccarhuayo District, west of the river Pinchimurumayu (Pinchimuro Mayo, also named Mapachu (Mapacho)).
