= Ccarhuayo District =

Ccarhuayo Qarwayu
- District
- Interactive map of Ccarhuayo
- Country: Peru
- Region: Cusco
- Province: Quispicanchi
- Founded: November 25, 1960
- Capital: Ccarhuayo

Government
  - Mayor: Valerio Aparicio Holgado

Area
  - Total: 313.89 km^{2} (121.19 sq mi)
- Elevation: 3,442 m (11,293 ft)

Population (2005 census)
  - Total: 2,943
  - Density: 9.376/km^{2} (24.28/sq mi)
- Time zone: UTC-5 (PET)
- UBIGEO: 081204

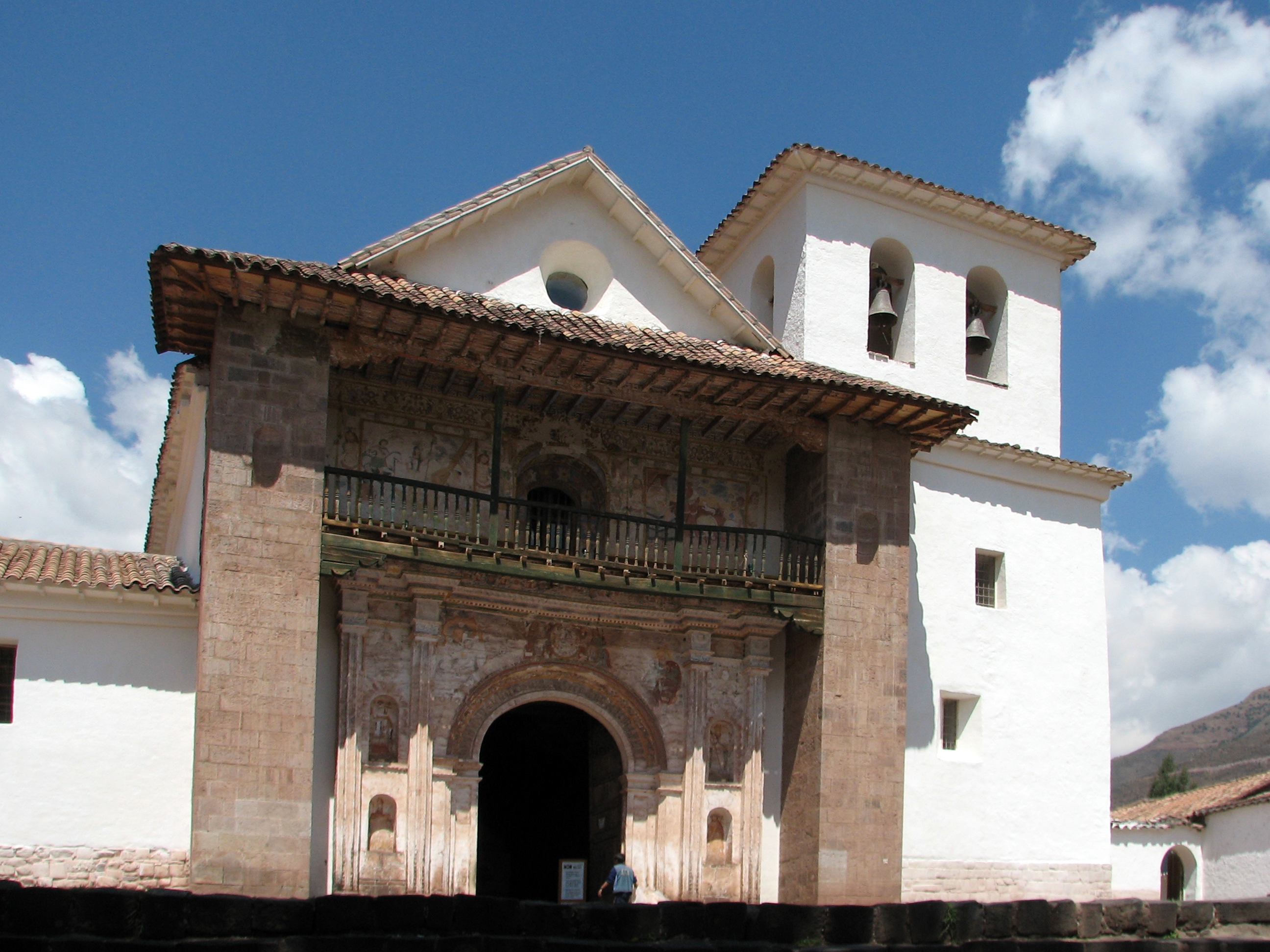
Church of Andahuaylilas in Andahuaylilas

The Ccarhuayo District is one of the twelve districts in the Quispicanchi Province in Peru. Created by Law No. 13476 on November 25, 1960, its seat is Ccarhuayo.

== Geography ==
One of the highest peaks of the district is Qullqi P'unqu at 5,522 m (18,117 ft). Other mountains are listed below:

- Inti Qhawana
- Inti Qhawarina
- Kuntur Sinqa
- Minasniyuq
- Misa Pata
- Pinchimuru
- Pukara
- Qullpa Tira
- Q'inqu Punta
- Saywa Urqu
- Sinaqara
- Takina Urqu
- T'uquyuq
- Uturunku
- Wiksayuq
- Wisk'achani

== Ethnic groups ==
The people in the district are mainly indigenous citizens of Quechua descent. Quechua is the language which the majority of the population (96.69%) learnt to speak in childhood, 3.20% of the residents started speaking using the Spanish language (2007 Peru Census).
