= Yuraq Q'asa (Canchis-Quispicanchi) =

Mountain in Peru

- Location within Peru

Highest point
- Elevation: 4,800 m (15,700 ft)
- Coordinates: 13°54′26″S 71°21′34″W

Geography
- Location: Peru, Cusco Region
- Parent range: Andes

Yuraq Q'asa (Quechua yuraq white, q'asa mountain pass, "white mountain pass", Hispanicized spelling Yuracjasa) is a mountain in the Andes of Peru, about 4,800 metres (15,748 ft) high. It lies in the Cusco Region, Canchis Province, Pitumarca District, and in the Quispicanchi Province, Cusipata District. Yuraq Q'asa is situated south of the mountain Ch'aqu, west of the mountain Chachakumayuq and north-east of the mountain Tiklla Q'asa.
