= Kosñipata District =

Kosñipata Q'usñi Pata
- District
- Interactive map of Kosñipata
- Coordinates: 13°01′S 71°24′W
- Country: Peru
- Region: Cusco
- Province: Paucartambo
- Founded: June 15, 1962
- Capital: Pilcopata

Government
  - Mayor: Juan José Rodriguez Aquise

Area
  - Total: 3,745.68 km^{2} (1,446.22 sq mi)
- Elevation: 527 m (1,729 ft)

Population (2005 census)
  - Total: 4,610
  - Density: 1.23/km^{2} (3.19/sq mi)
- Time zone: UTC-5 (PET)
- UBIGEO: 081106

Kosñipata District is one of six districts of the province Paucartambo in Peru.

== Geography ==
One of the highest peaks of the district is Qullqi P'unqu at 5,522 m (18,117 ft). Other mountains are listed below:

- Ananta Q'asa
- Anta Qhawarina
- Añu Añuyuq
- Apachita Q'asa
- Aqu Urqu
- Hatun Allpapata
- Hatun Ichhu Muqu
- Ichhu Wasi
- Jach'a Sira
- K'usilluyuq
- Llama Llusk'ana
- Minasniyuq
- Pantilla Qucha
- Qhispi Rumiyuq
- Usana Qucha
- Usana Urqu
- Wallwa Qucha
- Wask'a Qucha
- Willulluni
- Yana Urqu

== Ethnic groups ==
The people in the district are mainly indigenous citizens of Quechua descent. Quechua is the language which the majority of the population (%) learnt to speak in childhood, % of the residents started speaking using the Spanish language (2007 Peru Census).

== Climate ==
Climate data for Chontachaca, Kosñipata, elevation 872 m (2,861 ft), (1991–2020)
Month	Jan	Feb	Mar	Apr	May	Jun	Jul	Aug	Sep	Oct	Nov	Dec	Year
Mean daily maximum °C (°F)	27.7 (81.9)	27.2 (81.0)	27.6 (81.7)	27.6 (81.7)	26.3 (79.3)	25.7 (78.3)	25.8 (78.4)	27.2 (81.0)	28.1 (82.6)	28.4 (83.1)	28.1 (82.6)	27.6 (81.7)	27.3 (81.1)
Mean daily minimum °C (°F)	18.9 (66.0)	19.0 (66.2)	18.6 (65.5)	18.0 (64.4)	17.2 (63.0)	16.3 (61.3)	15.6 (60.1)	16.0 (60.8)	16.7 (62.1)	17.8 (64.0)	18.4 (65.1)	18.7 (65.7)	17.6 (63.7)
Average precipitation mm (inches)	565.5 (22.26)	553.2 (21.78)	571.6 (22.50)	418.9 (16.49)	315.2 (12.41)	299.9 (11.81)	248.7 (9.79)	225.6 (8.88)	271.8 (10.70)	439.8 (17.31)	413.0 (16.26)	512.2 (20.17)	4,835.4 (190.36)
Source: National Meteorology and Hydrology Service of Peru

== Subdistrict ==
- Kosñipata Subdistrict (Kosñipata)

== Canton ==
- Pillcopata Canton (Pillcopata)
- Bernardo Canton (Bernardo, San Lou, Tarn Loku)
