= Quishuarnioj =

Mountain in Peru

- Auzangate
- Location within Peru

Highest point
- Elevation: 5,700 m (18,700 ft)
- Coordinates: 13°44′07″S 70°53′40″W

Geography
- Location: Peru, Cusco Region
- Parent range: Andes, Vilcanota

Quishuarnioj (possibly from Quechua kiswar a species of shrub or tree (Buddleja incana), -ni, -yuq suffixes, "the one with kiswar") or Auzangate (in Hispanicized spelling) is a mountain in the Vilcanota mountain range in the Andes of Peru, about 5,700 metres (18,701 ft) high. It is situated in the Cusco Region, Quispicanchi Province, Marcapata District. Quishuarnioj is the dominating peak between the Parina valley and the Sayapata valley. It lies north of Yanajasa and southeast of Ccolcce.
