= Raimi =

Raimi is a given name and surname. Notable people with the name include:

== Given name ==
- Raimi Gbadamosi (born 1965), British artist and writer
- Raimi Kola (born 1995), Beninese footballer
- Raimi Merritt (born 1993), American wakeboarder
- Raimi Nor (born 1986), Malaysian footballer

== Surname ==
- The Raimi brothers
  - Ivan Raimi (born 1956), American physician and screenwriter
  - Sam Raimi (born 1959), American filmmaker
  - Ted Raimi (born 1965), American actor, director, and writer
- Ali Yahya Mahdi Al Raimi (born 1984), Yemeni detained at Guantanamo Bay
- Funlola Aofiyebi-Raimi (born 1970), Nigerian actress
- Kim Raimi (born 1985), Finnish football manager and player
- Yasameen Al-Raimi (born 1985), Yemeni sports shooter

== Fictional characters ==
- John Raimi, protagonist of the video game Geist
- Worm Raimi, character in the manga and anime series Saint Seiya

== See also ==
- Raymi
