= Oropesa District, Quispicanchi =

Coordinates: 13.5964°S 71.7654°W

Oropesa
- District
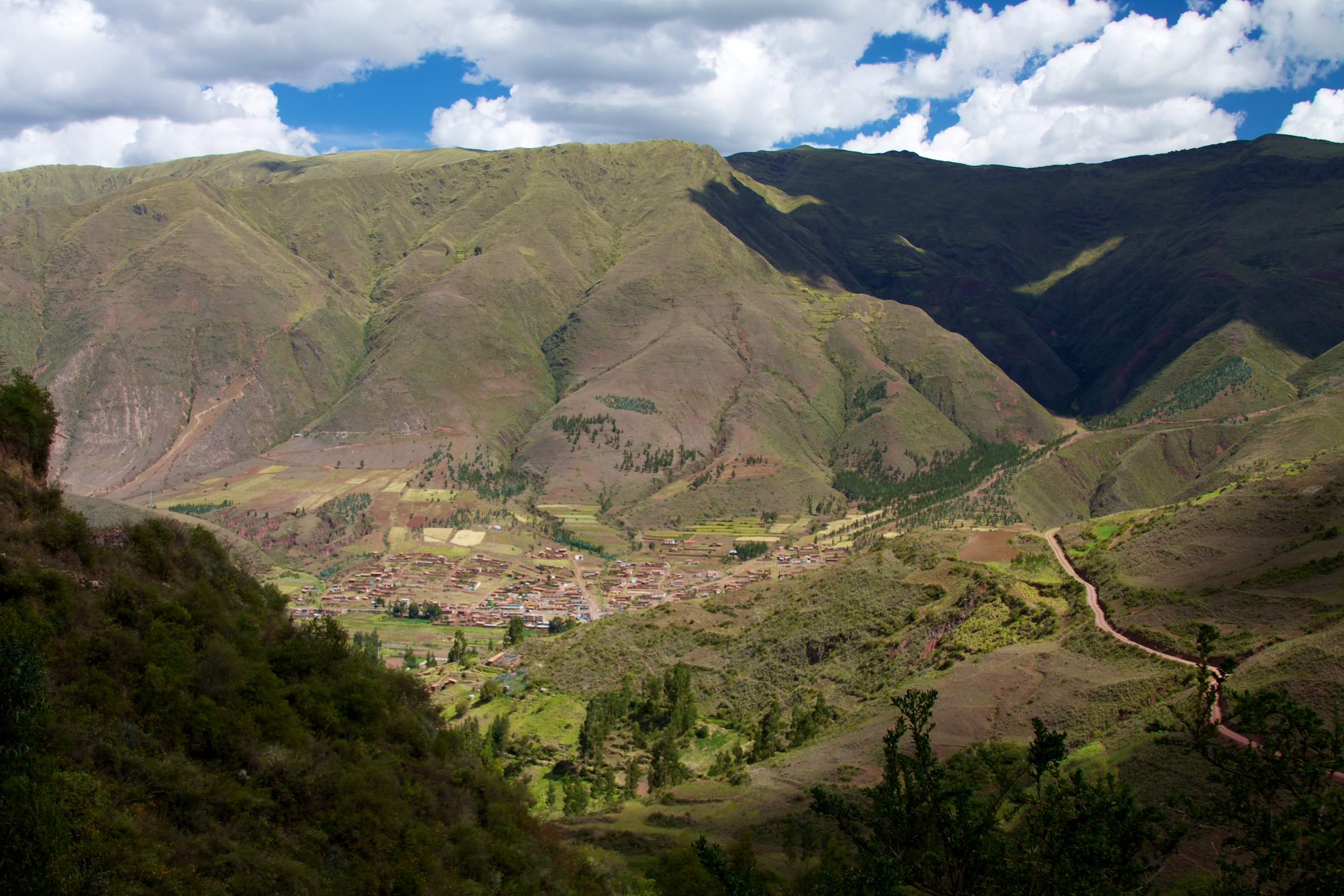
- Oropesa District as seen from Tipon
- Interactive map of Oropesa
- Country: Peru
- Region: Cusco
- Province: Quispicanchi
- Capital: Oropesa

Government
  - Mayor: Mario Samanez Yáñez

Area
  - Total: 74.44 km^{2} (28.74 sq mi)
- Elevation: 3,116 m (10,223 ft)

Population (2005 census)
  - Total: 6,209
  - Density: 83.41/km^{2} (216.0/sq mi)
- Time zone: UTC-5 (PET)
- UBIGEO: 081211

The Oropesa District is one of the twelve districts in the Quispicanchi Province in Peru. Its capital is the town of Oropesa.

== Geography ==
One of the highest peaks of the district is Pachatusan at 4,842 m (15,886 ft). Other mountains are listed below:

- Maransirayuq
- Pachatusan
- Quri Qalla
- Quriwayrachina
- Sinchi Q'umirniyuq
- Waypun

== See also ==
- T'anta Raymi
