= Lake Pucacocha (Ocongate) =

Lake in Peru

- Location within Peru
- Location: Peru; Cusco Region, Quispicanchi Province
- Coordinates: 13°41′30″S 71°8′40″W

Lake Pucacocha (possibly from Quechua puka red, qucha lake, "red lake") is a lake in the Vilcanota mountain range in Peru. It is situated in the Cusco Region, Quispicanchi Province, Ocongate District. Lake Pucacocha lies between Lake Singrenacocha in the north-west and Lake Huarurumicocha in the south-east. The small lakes north and south of it are called Alcacocha and Yanacocha.
