= Ccatca =

- Village
- Location within Peru
- Coordinates: 13°36′17″S 71°33′34″W
- Country: Peru
- Region: Cusco
- Province: Quispicanchi
- District: Ccatca

Government
  - Mayor: Pedro Illanes Paucar
- Elevation: 3,675 m (12,057 ft)
- Time zone: UTC-5 (PET)

CCatca is a town in Southern Peru, capital of the district Ccatca in the province Quispicanchi in the region Cusco.

== Climate ==
Climate data for Ccatca, elevation 3,681 m (12,077 ft), (1991–2020)
Month	Jan	Feb	Mar	Apr	May	Jun	Jul	Aug	Sep	Oct	Nov	Dec	Year
Mean daily maximum °C (°F)	14.6 (58.3)	14.4 (57.9)	14.5 (58.1)	15.2 (59.4)	16.1 (61.0)	15.7 (60.3)	15.3 (59.5)	15.6 (60.1)	15.7 (60.3)	16.1 (61.0)	16.3 (61.3)	15.3 (59.5)	15.4 (59.7)
Mean daily minimum °C (°F)	4.2 (39.6)	4.2 (39.6)	3.9 (39.0)	2.4 (36.3)	−0.5 (31.1)	−2.1 (28.2)	−2.7 (27.1)	−1.5 (29.3)	0.9 (33.6)	2.7 (36.9)	3.4 (38.1)	3.9 (39.0)	1.6 (34.8)
Average precipitation mm (inches)	131.8 (5.19)	134.8 (5.31)	105.6 (4.16)	29.8 (1.17)	6.7 (0.26)	6.1 (0.24)	6.0 (0.24)	10.0 (0.39)	14.3 (0.56)	42.2 (1.66)	64.9 (2.56)	114.3 (4.50)	666.5 (26.24)
Source: National Meteorology and Hydrology Service of Peru
