= Quiquijana District =

Coordinates: 13.8220°S 71.5416°W

Quiquijana
- District
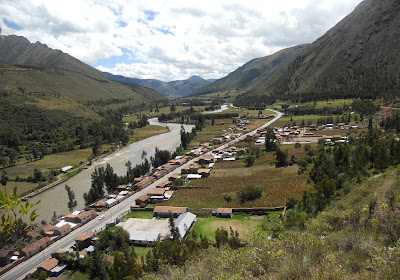
- Interactive map of Quiquijana
- Country: Peru
- Region: Cusco
- Province: Quispicanchi
- Capital: Quiquijana

Government
  - Mayor: Lucio Ttito Huaraccone

Area
  - Total: 360.90 km^{2} (139.34 sq mi)
- Elevation: 3,210 m (10,530 ft)

Population (2005 census)
  - Total: 10,224
  - Density: 28.329/km^{2} (73.372/sq mi)
- Time zone: UTC-5 (PET)
- UBIGEO: 081212

The Quiquijana District is one of the twelve districts in the Quispicanchi Province in Peru. Its capital is the town of Quiquijana.

== Geography ==
The most important river of the district is the Willkanuta which crosses the district from south-east to north-west.

One of the highest peaks of the district is Yana Urqu at 4,644 m (15,236 ft). Other mountains are listed below:

- Inka Kancha
- Inti Watana
- Khuchiyuq
- Pukara
- Puma Urqu
- Quri
- Qhispi Urqu
- Q'asa Wasi
- Ruq'a Urqu
- Tinki Muqu
- Uchu Q'asa
- Waman Marka
- Wankar Phuku

== Ethnic groups ==
The people in the district are mainly indigenous citizens of Quechua descent. Quechua is the language which the majority of the population (88.42%) learnt to speak in childhood, 11.25% of the residents started speaking using the Spanish language (2007 Peru Census).
