= Velacota (Cusco) =

Mountain in Peru

- Location within Peru

Highest point
- Elevation: 5,100 m (16,700 ft)
- Coordinates: 13°32′39″S 71°09′08″W

Geography
- Location: Peru, Cusco Region, Quispicanchi Province
- Parent range: Andes, Vilcanota

Velacota (possibly from Aymara wila blood, blood-red, quta lake, "red lake") is mountain in the Vilcanota mountain range in the Andes of Peru, about 5,100 metres (16,732 ft) high. It is located in the Cusco Region, Quispicanchi Province, in the districts of Marcapata and Ocongate. Velacota lies southeast of Jolljepunco and southwest of Ancahuachana.
