= Ch'aqu =

Mountain in Peru

- Location within Peru

Highest point
- Elevation: 5,000 m (16,000 ft)
- Coordinates: 13°52′42″S 71°22′02″W

Geography
- Location: Peru, Cusco Region
- Parent range: Andes

Ch'aqu (Quechua for a fine, whitish, edible and medicinal kind of clay, Hispanicized spelling Chajo) is a mountain in the Andes of Peru, about 5,000 metres (16,404 ft) high. It is located in the Cusco Region, Quispicanchi Province, Cusipata District. It lies northeast of Hatun Ch'aqu and Yanaqaqa ("black rock", Yanajaja) and northwest of Yuraq Q'asa. Ch'aqu is situated on the left bank of the river Pukamayu ("red river", Pucamayu) which flows to the west as a right affluent of the Willkanuta River. The confluence is near Cusipata.
