= T'anta Raymi =

Religious feast in Oropesa, Quispicanchi, Peru

T'anta Raymi (Quechua t'anta bread, raymi feast, "bread feast") is a religious feast in Peru. It is celebrated annually on October 4 in Oropesa in the Cusco Region, Quispicanchi Province, Oropesa District.
