= Pachamama Raymi =

Pachamama Raymi (Quechua Pachamama Mother Earth, raymi feast, "Mother Earth feast") is a ceremony held annually on August 1 in Ecuador and Peru.

== Location ==
=== Ecuador ===
In Ecuador, the feast is celebrated in the Zamora-Chinchipe Province.

=== Peru ===
In Peru it takes place in the Ccatca District of the Cusco Region, Quispicanchi Province, on August 1.

== Other uses of the expression ==
Pachamama Raymi also refers to a methodology to generate widespread prosperity in areas of extreme poverty. The methodology was developed since 1988 in Cusco, Peru.

== See also ==
- Willka Raymi
