= Alcamarinayoc =

Mountain in Peru

- Colque Cruz
- Location within Peru

Highest point
- Elevation: 6,102 m (20,020 ft)
- Prominence: 1,310 m (4,300 ft)
- Parent peak: Callangate
- Coordinates: 13°41′59″S 71°05′41″W

Geography
- Location: Peru, Cusco Region
- Parent range: Andes, Vilcanota

Climbing
- First ascent: 08/14/1957 - Craig Merrihue, William Hooker, Steven Jervis, Earle Whipple (USA) 08/14/1957 - Craig Merrihue, William Hooker, Steven Jervis, Earle Whipple (USA). 1-1953 via N. ridge: N. face-1974: S.E. ridge-1974: W.- E.traverse-1984: N. face direct-1987.

Alcamarinayoc (possibly from Aymara and Quechua allqamari mountain caracara) or Colque Cruz (possibly from Aymara and Quechua qullqi money, silver, Spanish cruz cross) is a 6,102-metre-high (20,020 ft) mountain in the Vilcanota mountain range in the Andes of Peru. It is situated in the Cusco Region, Quispicanchi Province, Ocongate District. Alcamarinayoc lies northwest of the peak of Chumpe, north of Quevesere and northeast of Ichhu Ananta.

== First Ascent ==
Colque Cruz was first climbed by Craig Merrihue, William Hooker, Steven Jervis, Earle Whipple (USA) 14 August 1957.

== Elevation ==
Other data from available digital elevation models: SRTM yields 6069 metres, ASTER 6050 metres and TanDEM-X 6111 metres. The height of the nearest key col is 4792 meters, leading to a topographic prominence of 1310 meters. Colque Cruz is considered a Mountain Subrange according to the Dominance System and its dominance is 21.47%. Its parent peak is Callangate and the Topographic isolation is 7.9 kilometers.
