= Ocongate District =

Coordinates: 13.6293°S 71.3860°W

Ocongate
- District
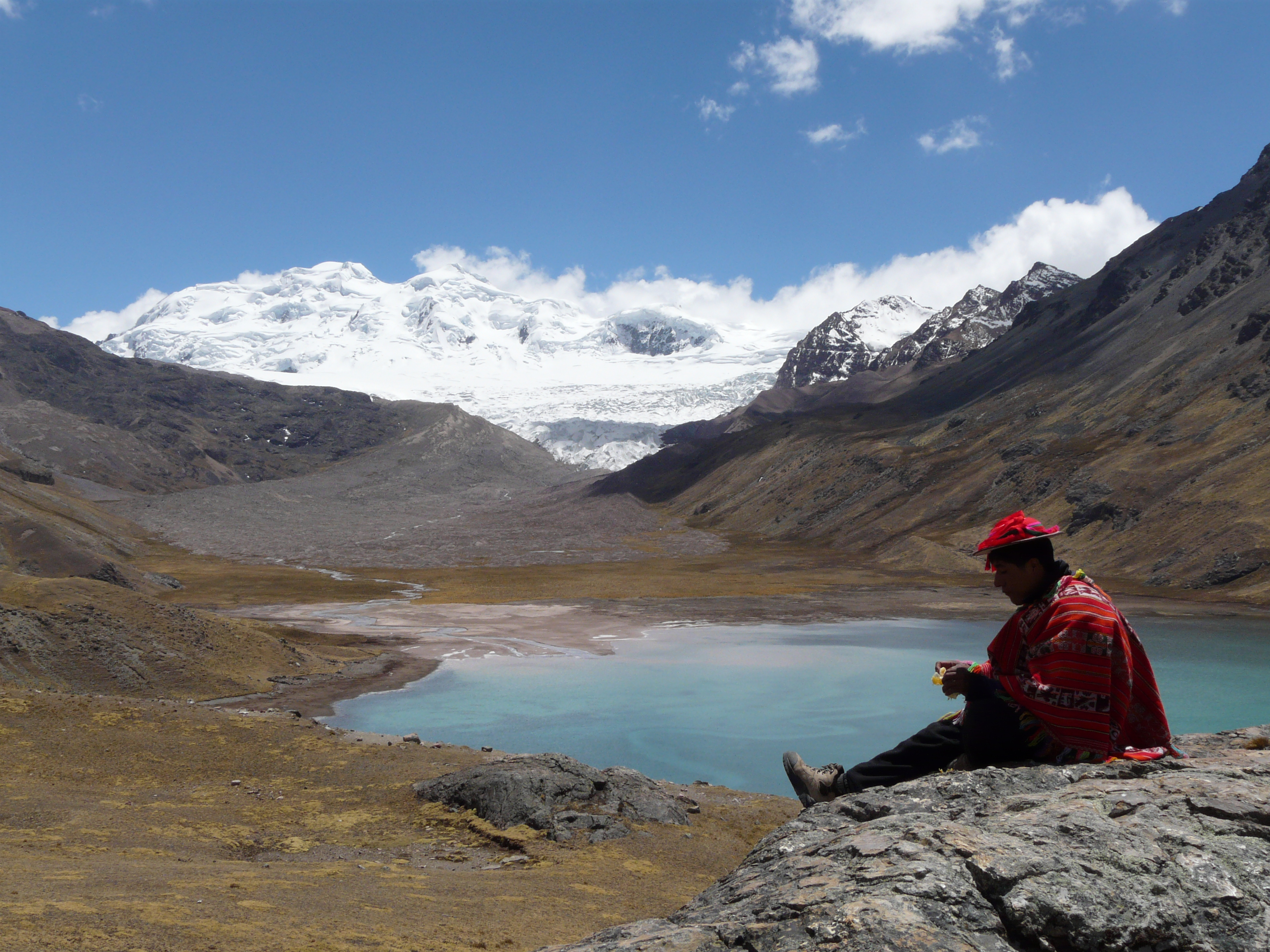
- Siwinaqucha
- Interactive map of Ocongate
- Country: Peru
- Region: Cusco
- Province: Quispicanchi
- Founded: January 2, 1857
- Capital: Ocongate

Government
  - Mayor: Graciano Mandura Crispín

Area
  - Total: 952.66 km^{2} (367.82 sq mi)
- Elevation: 3,533 m (11,591 ft)

Population (2005 census)
  - Total: 13,872
  - Density: 14.561/km^{2} (37.714/sq mi)
- Time zone: UTC-5 (PET)
- UBIGEO: 081210

The Ocongate District is one of the twelve districts in the Quispicanchi Province in Peru. Created on January 2, 1857, its capital is the town of Ocongate.

== Geography ==
The Willkanuta mountain range traverses the district. Some of the highest peaks are listed below:

- Allqamarinayuq
- Anka Wachanan
- Anta P'unqu
- Anta Qalla
- Aquy Kunka
- Chawpi Urqu
- Chinchay Wasi
- Chumpi
- Chuwa Chuwa
- Ch'aki Quchana
- Ch'uñuna
- Hatun Allpapata
- Hatun Punta
- Hatunuma
- Huch'uy Phawchinta
- Ichhu Ananta
- Ichhu Urqu
- Kicha Qaqa
- Kimsa Puka Urqu
- Kulli Kunka
- Kuntur Sinqa
- Kuntur Sayana
- K'ark'apata
- Minasniyuq
- Mulluqucha
- Pachayuq
- Paquyuq
- Pariyuq
- Pata Ananta
- Pata Qayqu
- Pirwani
- Pukaqucha
- Puka Punta
- P'allqa Q'asa
- Qaqa Chaka
- Qayqu Urqu
- Qiwllaqucha
- Qucha Quchayuq
- Qullpa Ananta
- Qullqi P'unqu
- Qhispirumiyuq
- Q'illu Muqu
- Q'iwisiri
- Sinaqara
- Sinkrina
- Sura Ananta
- Surimani
- Usqullu Ananta
- Wamanlipa
- Wamanripayuq
- Wasaqucha
- Wask'a Qucha
- Waylla Pata
- Waylla Tira
- Wayruru Punku
- Wila Sirka
- Wilaquta
- Wisk'achani
- Yana Qaqa
- Yana Qucha
- Yana Urqu
- Yuraq Kancha
- Yuraq Qaqa

== Ethnic groups ==
The people in the district are mainly indigenous citizens of Quechua descent. Quechua is the language which the majority of the population (90.98%) learnt to speak in childhood, 8.69% of the residents started speaking using the Spanish language (2007 Peru Census).

== See also ==
- Armaqucha
- Pukaqucha
- Sinkrinaqucha
- Siwinaqucha
- Warurumiqucha
