= Pucacocha (Marcapata) =

Mountain in Peru

- Location within Peru

Highest point
- Elevation: 5,320 m (17,450 ft)
- Coordinates: 13°44′16″S 71°01′55″W

Naming
- Language of name: Quechua

Geography
- Location: Peru, Cusco Region, Quispicanchi Province, Marcapata District
- Parent range: Andes, Vilcanota

Pucacocha (possibly from Quechua puka red, qucha lake, "red lake") is a 5,320-metre-high (17,454 ft) mountain in the Vilcanota mountain range in the Andes of Peru. It is situated in the Cusco Region, Quispicanchi Province, Marcapata District. Pucacocha lies northeast of Jatunñaño Punta.
