= Ancahuachana (Quispicanchi) =

Mountain in Peru near Cusco

- Mama Rosa
- Location within Peru

Highest point
- Elevation: 5,100 m (16,700 ft)
- Coordinates: 13°31′06″S 71°07′07″W

Geography
- Location: Peru, Cusco Region
- Parent range: Andes, Vilcanota

Ancahuachana (possibly from Quechua anka black-chested buzzard-eagle or eagle, wacha birth, to give birth -na a suffix, "where the eagle is born") or Mama Rosa is a mountain in the Vilcanota mountain range in the Andes of Peru, about 5,100 metres (16,732 ft) high. It is situated in the Cusco Region, Quispicanchi Province, in the districts of Camanti and Marcapata. Ancahuachana lies northeast of Singrenacocha and east of Colquepunco.
