= Cinajara =

Mountain in Peru

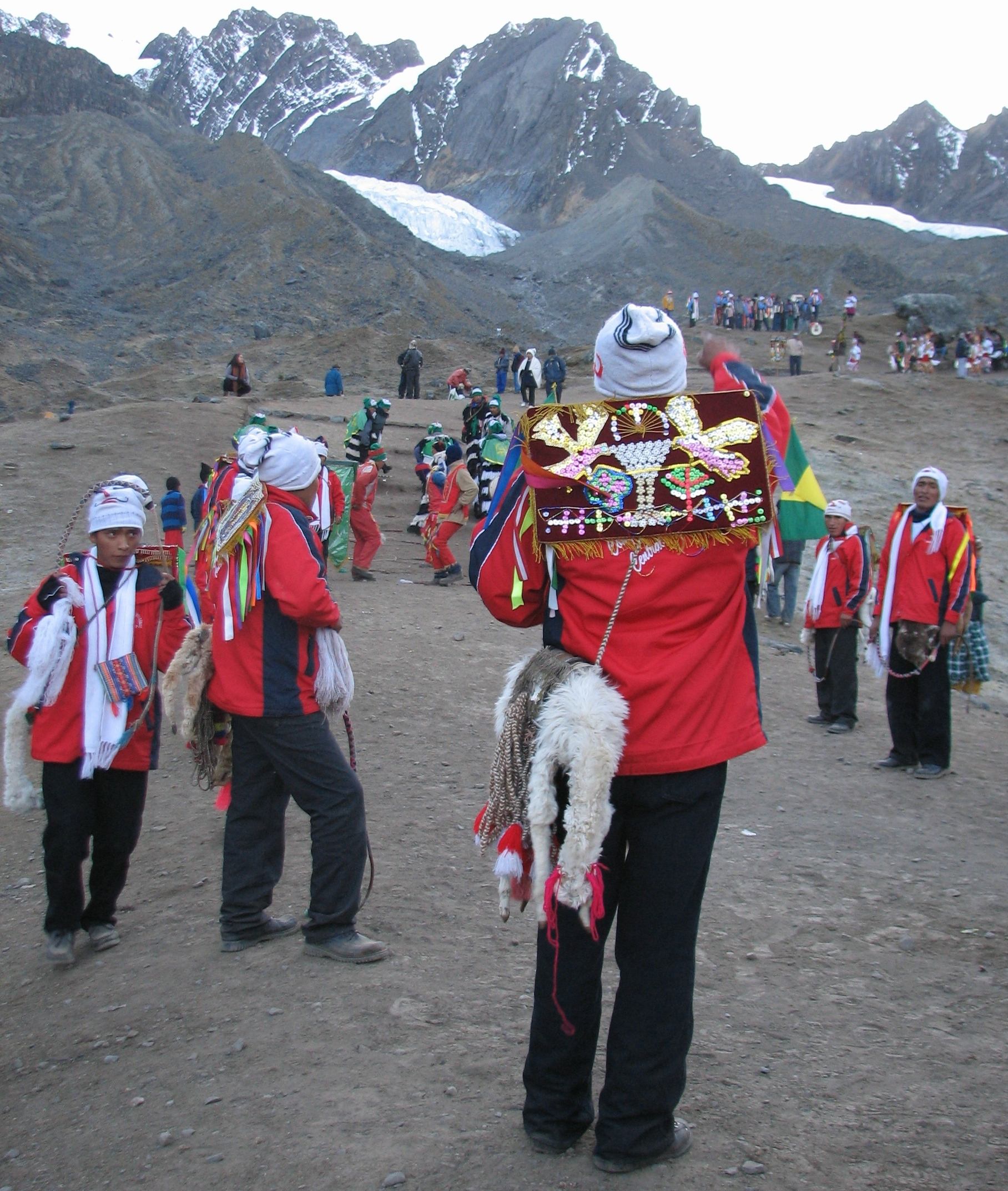
- Quyllur Rit'i festival at the foothills of Cinajara and Jolljepunco

Highest point
- Elevation: 5,471 m (17,949 ft)
- Coordinates: 13°31′42″S 71°14′01″W

Geography
- Location within Peru
- Location: Peru, Cusco Region
- Parent range: Andes, Vilcanota

Climbing
- First ascent: 1-1979 via S.E. ridge.

Cinajara or Sinaqara is a mountain in the Vilcanota mountain range in the Andes of Peru, about 5,471 metres (17,949 ft) high. It is situated in the Cusco Region, Quispicanchi Province, in the districts Ccarhuayo and Ocongate. Cinajara lies southwest of the Jolljepunco. The annual religious Quyllur Rit'i festival takes place at the foot of the mountains Cinajara and Jolljepunco.
