= Quyllurit'i =

Religious festival in Peru

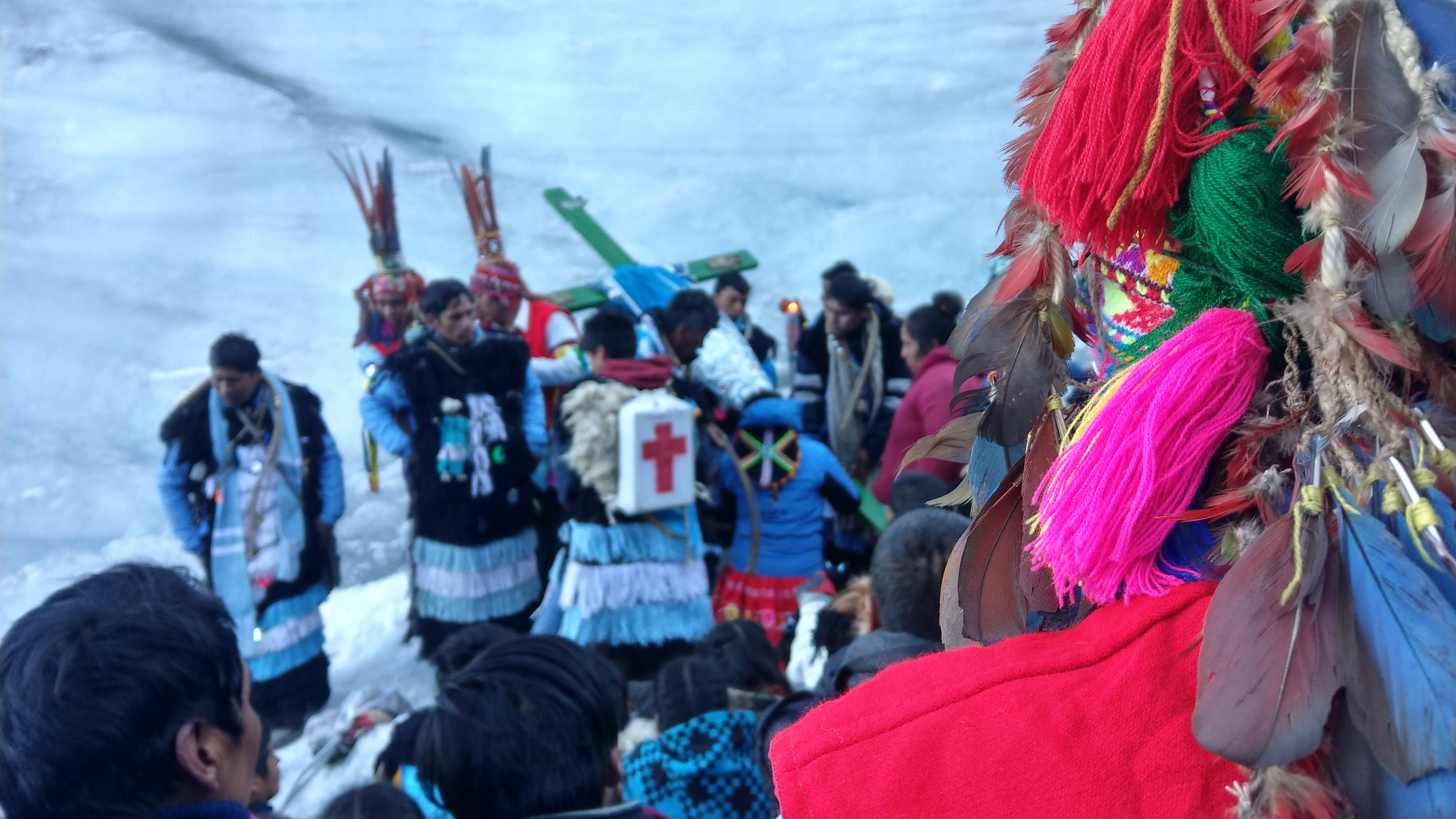
- The pilgrimage to Nevado Colque Punku
- Locations: Sinakara Valley, Cusco Region
- Country: Peru

Cultural Heritage of Peru
- Official name: Santuario de Qoyllorit'i Festividad de Qoyllorit'i de Cusco
- Type: Intangible
- Criteria: Festivals and ritual celebrations
- Designated: 10 August 2004; 22 years ago
- Legal basis: RDN 608/INC-2004

Pilgrimage to the sanctuary of the Lord of Qoyllurit'i
- UNESCO Intangible Cultural Heritage
- Country: Peru
- Reference: 00567
- Region: Latin America and the Caribbean

Inscription history
- Inscription: 2011 (6th session)
- List: Representative

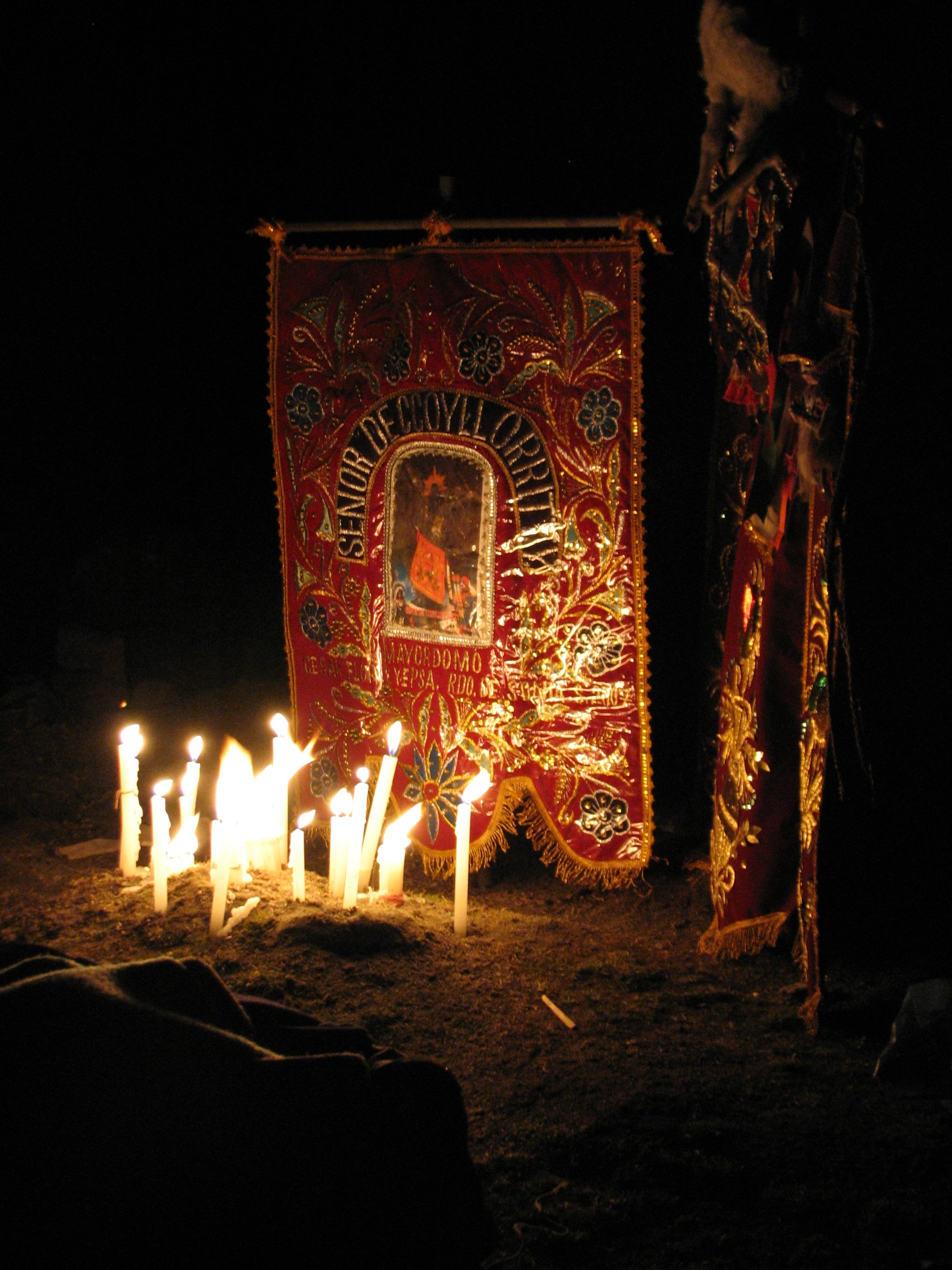
Shrine of the Lord of Quyllurit'i at night

Quyllurit'i or Qoyllur Rit'i (Quechua: quyllu rit'i 'bright white snow', from quyllu 'bright white' and rit'i 'snow') is a syncretic religious festival held annually at the Sinakara Valley in the southern highlands Cusco Region of Peru. Local indigenous people of the Andes know this festival as a native celebration of the stars. In particular they celebrate the reappearance of the Pleiades constellation, known in Quechua as Qullqa, or 'Storehouse', and associated with the upcoming harvest and New Year. The Pleiades disappears from view in April and reappears in June. The new year is marked by indigenous people of the Southern Hemisphere on the Winter Solstice in June, and it is also a Catholic festival. The people have celebrated this period of time for hundreds if not thousands of years. The pilgrimage and associated festival was inscribed in 2011 on the UNESCO Intangible Cultural Heritage Lists.

According to the Catholic Church, the festival is in honor of the Lord of Quyllurit'i (Quechua: Taytacha Quyllurit'i, Spanish: Señor de Quyllurit'i) and it originated in the late 18th century. The young native herder Mariano Mayta befriended a mestizo boy named Manuel on the mountain Qullqipunku. Thanks to Manuel, Mariano's herd prospered, so his father sent him to Cusco to buy a new shirt for Manuel. Mariano could not find anything similar, because that kind of cloth was sold only to the archbishop. Learning of this, the bishop of Cusco sent a party to investigate. When they tried to capture Manuel, he was transformed into a bush with an image of Christ crucified hanging from it. Thinking the archbishop's party had harmed his friend, Mariano died on the spot. He was buried under a rock, which became a place of pilgrimage known as the Lord of Quyllurit'i, or "Lord of Star (Brilliant) Snow." An image of Christ was painted on this boulder.

The Quyllurit'i festival attracts thousands of indigenous people from the surrounding regions, made up of Paucartambo groups (Quechua speakers) from the agricultural regions to the northwest of the shrine, and Quispicanchis (Aymara speakers) from the pastoral (herders) regions to the southeast. Both moieties make an annual pilgrimage to the feast, bringing large troupes of dancers and musicians. There are four groups of participants with particular roles: ch'unchu, qulla, ukuku, and machula. Attendees increasingly have included middle-class Peruvians and foreign tourists.

The festival takes place in late May or early June, to coincide with the full moon. It falls one week before the Christian feast of Corpus Christi. Events include several processions of holy icons and dances in and around the shrine of the Lord of Quyllurit'i. The culminating event for the indigenous non-Christian population takes place after the reappearance of Qullqa in the night sky; it is the rising of the sun after the full moon. Tens of thousands of people kneel to greet the first rays of light as the sun rises above the horizon. Until recently, the main event for the Church was carried out by ukukus, who climbed glaciers over Qullqipunku and brought back crosses and blocks of ice to place along the road to the shrine. These are believed to be medicinal with healing qualities. Due to the melting of the glacier, the ice is no longer carried down.

== Origins ==
There are several accounts of the origins of the Quyllurit'i festival. What follows are two versions: one relates the pre-Columbian origins, and the other the Catholic Church's version as compiled by the priest of the town of Ccatca between 1928 and 1946.

=== Pre-Columbian origins ===
The Inca followed both solar and lunar cycles throughout the year. The cycle of the moon was of primary importance for the timing of both agricultural activities and associated festivals. There are many celebration of seasonal events related to animal husbandry, sowing seeds, and harvesting of crops. Important festivals such as Quyllurit'i, perhaps the most important festival given its significance and meaning, are still celebrated on the full moon.

The Quyllurit'i festival takes place at the end of a period of a few months when the Pleiades constellation, or Seven Sisters, a 7-star cluster in the Taurus constellation, disappears and reappears in the skies of the Southern Hemisphere. Its time of disappearance was marked in Inca culture by a festival for Pariacaca, the god of water and torrential rains. It occurs near the date of qarwa mita (qarwa meaning when the corn leaves are yellow).

The return of the constellation about 40 days later, called unquy mita in Quechua, was long associated in the Southern Hemisphere with the time of the coming harvest and therefore a time of abundance for the people. Incan astronomers had named the Pleiades constellation as Qullqa, or "storehouse," in their native language of Quechua.

Metaphorically, the constellation's disappearance from the night sky and reemergence approximately two months afterward is a signal that the human planes of existence have times of disorder and chaos, but also return to order.

=== Catholic Church origins ===
In the city of Cuzco in the late 17th century, the celebration of Corpus Christi reached a height under Bishop Manuel de Mollinedo y Angulo (1673–99), with processions through the city including Inca nobles in ceremonial regalia. The bishop also commissioned portraits of the nobles in their ceremonial clothes. Scholars such as Carolyn Dean have studies this evidence for its suggestions about related church rituals.

Dean believes that such early churchmen thought that such Catholic rituals could displace indigenous ones. She examines the feast of Corpus Christi and its relationship to the indigenous harvest festival at winter solstice, celebrated in early June in the Southern Hemisphere. According to the church, events of the late 18th century that included a sighting of Christ on the mountain Qullqipunku became part of myth, and the pilgrimage festival of the Lord of Quyllurit'i is still celebrated in the 21st century.

It is told that an Indian boy named Mariano Mayta used to watch over his father's herd of alpaca on the slopes of the mountain. He wandered into the snowfields of the glacier, where he encountered a mestizo boy named Manuel. They became good friends, and Manuel provided Mariano with food. When the boy did not return home for meals, Mariano's father went looking for his son. He was surprised to find his herd had increased. As a reward, he sent Mariano to Cusco to get new clothes. Mariano asked to buy some also for Manuel, who wore the same outfit every day. His father agreed, so Mariano asked Manuel for a sample in order to buy the same kind of cloth in Cusco.

Mariano was told that this refined cloth was restricted for use only by the bishop of the city. Mariano went to see the prelate, who was surprised by the request. He ordered an inquiry of Manuel, directed by the priest of Oncogate (Quispicanchi), a village close to the mountain. On June 12, 1783, the commission ascended Qullqipunku with Mariano; they found Manuel dressed in white and shining with a bright light. Blinded, they retreated, returning with a larger party. On their second try they reached the boy. But when they touched him, he was transformed into a tayanka bush (Baccharis odorata) with the crucified Christ hanging from it. Thinking the party had harmed his friend, Mariano fell dead on the spot. He was buried under the rock where Manuel had last appeared.

The tayanka tree was sent to Spain, as requested by king Charles III. As it was never returned, the Indian population of Ocongate protested. The local priest ordered a replica, which became known as Lord of Tayankani (Spanish: Señor de Tayankani). The burial site of Mariano attracted a great number of Indian devotees, who lit candles before the rock. Religious authorities ordered the painting of an image of Christ crucified on the rock. This image became known as Lord of Quyllurit'i (Spanish: Señor de Quyllurit'i). In Quechua, quyllur means star and Rit'i means snow; thus, the term means Lord of Star Snow.

== Pilgrims ==
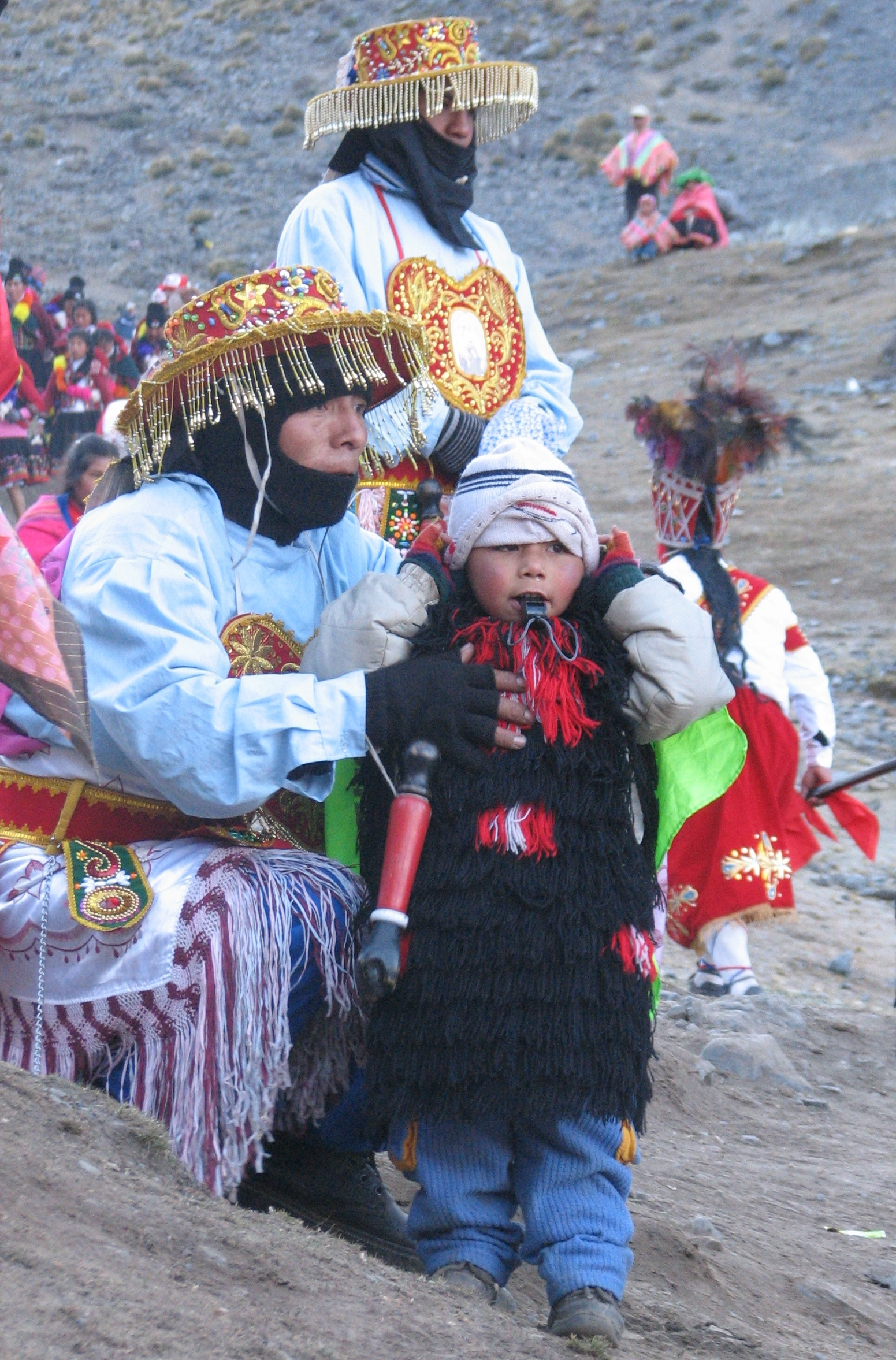
Dancers at Quyllurit'i. A ch'unchu performer can be seen behind and to the right of the child.

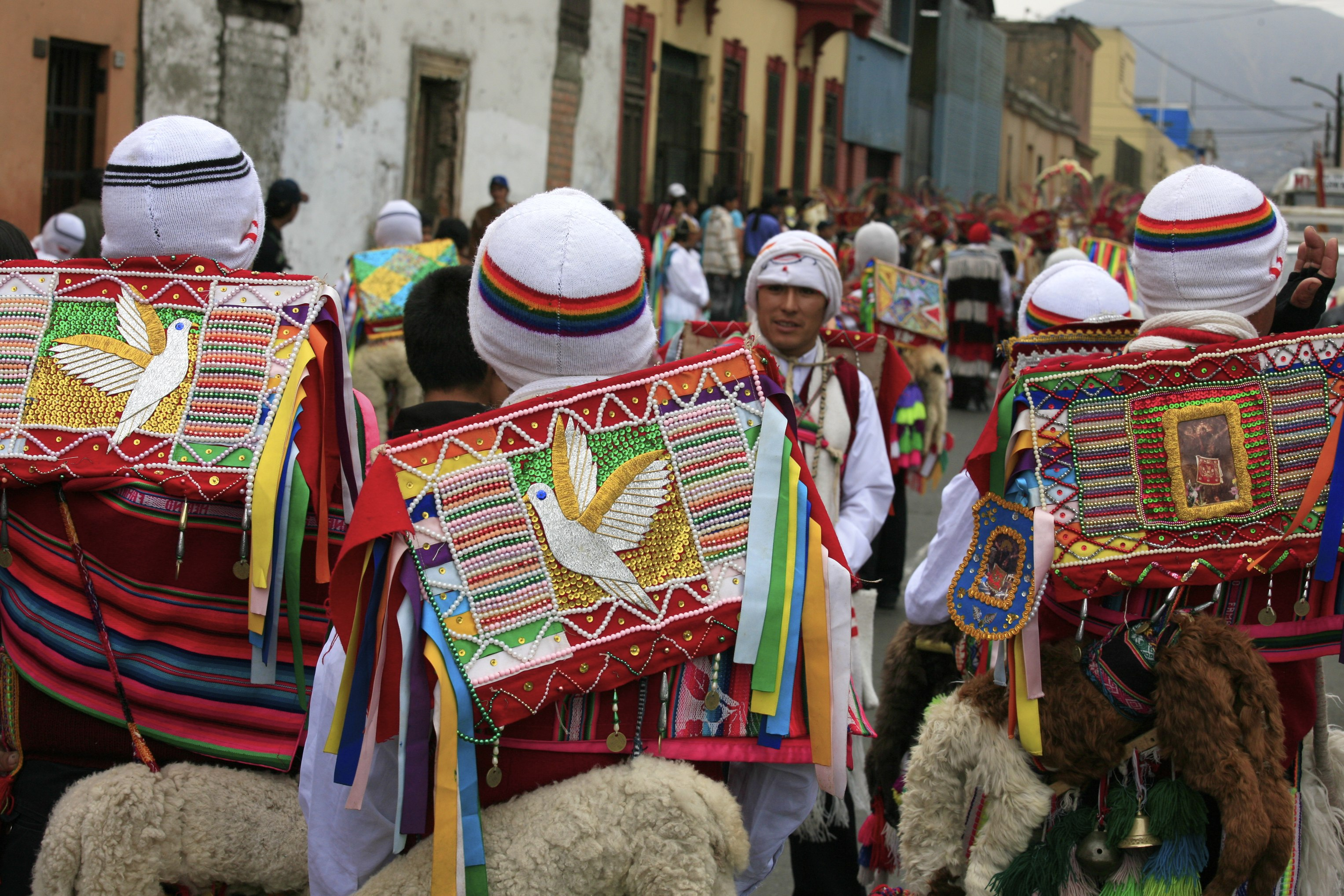
Festive costume of Qhapaq Qulla dancers

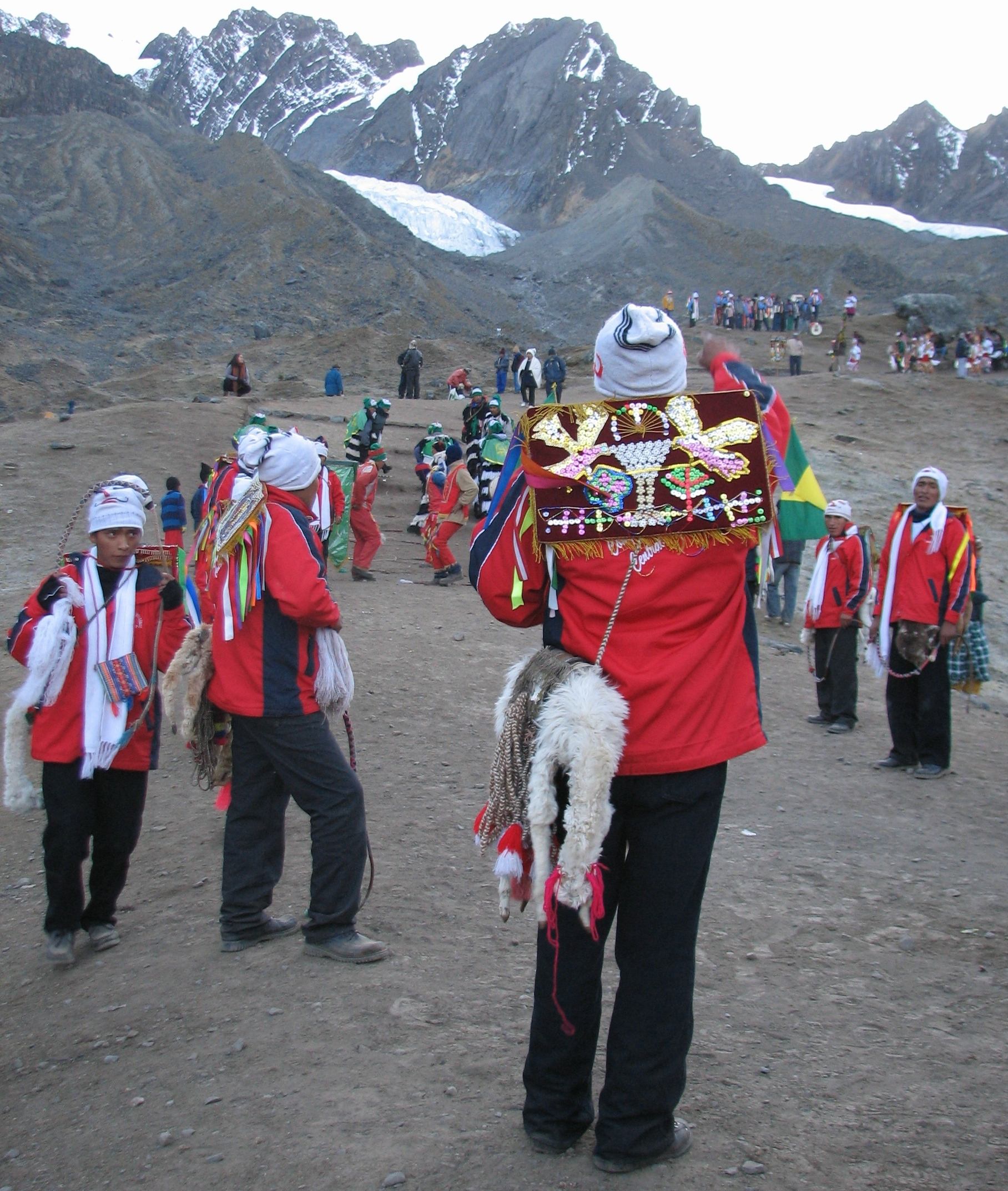
Dancers with the mountains Qullpiqunkpu and Sinaqara behind them.

The Quyllurit'i festival attracts more than 10,000 pilgrims annually, most of them indigenous peoples from rural communities in nearby regions. They are from two moieties: Quechua-speaking Paucartambo, people from agricultural communities located to the northwest of the shrine in the provinces of Cusco, Calca, Paucartambo and Urubamba; and Aymara-speaking Quispicanchis, which encompasses those living to the southeast in the provinces of Acomayo, Canas, Canchis and Quispicanchi, This geographic division also reflects social and economic distinctions, as the Quechuas of Paucartambo cultivate agricultural crops, whereas Quispicanchis is populated by the Aymara, whose lives are based on animal husbandry, especially herds of alpaca and llama.

Peasants from both moieties undertake an annual pilgrimage to the Quyllurit'i festival, with representatives of each community carrying a small image of Christ to the sanctuary. Together, these delegations include a large troupe of dancers and musicians dressed in four main styles:

- Ch'unchu: wearing feathered headdresses and carrying a wood staff, the ch'unchus represent the indigenous inhabitants of the Amazon rainforest, to the north of the sanctuary. There are several types of ch'unchu dancers; the most common is wayri ch'unchu, which comprises up to 70% of all Quyllurit'i dancers.
- Qhapaq Qulla: dressed in a "waq'ullu" knitted mask, a hat, a woven sling and a llama skin, qullas represent the Aymara inhabitants of the Altiplano to the south of the sanctuary. Qulla is considered a mestizo dance style, whereas ch'unchu is regarded as indigenous.
- Ukuku: clad in a dark coat and a woolen mask, the ukukus (spectacled bear) represent the role of tricksters; they speak in high-pitched voices, and play pranks, but have the serious responsibility of keeping order among the thousands of pilgrims. Some also go up to the glacier to spend the night. They cut blocks of glacier ice and carry them on their backs to their people at the festival in the valley. When melted, the water is believed to be medicinal for body and mind. It is used for holy water in the churches during the next year. In Quechua mythology, ukukus are the offspring of a woman and a bear, feared by everyone because of their supernatural strength. In these stories, the ukuku redeems itself by defeating a condenado, a cursed soul, and becoming an exemplary farmer.
- Machula: wearing a mask, a humpback, and a long coat, and carrying a walking stick, machulas represent the ñawpa machus, the mythical first inhabitants of the Andes. In a similar way to the ukukus, they perform an ambiguous role in the festival, being comical as well as constabulary figures.

Quyllur Rit'i also attracts visitors from outside the Paucartambo and Quispicanchis moieties. Since the 1970s, an increasing number of middle-class mainstream Peruvians undertake the pilgrimage, some of them at a different date than more traditional pilgrims. There has also been a rapid growth in the number of North American and European tourists drawn to the indigenous festival, prompting fears that it is becoming too commercialized. The pilgrimage and associated festival were inscribed in 2011 on the UNESCO Intangible Cultural Heritage Lists.

== Festival ==
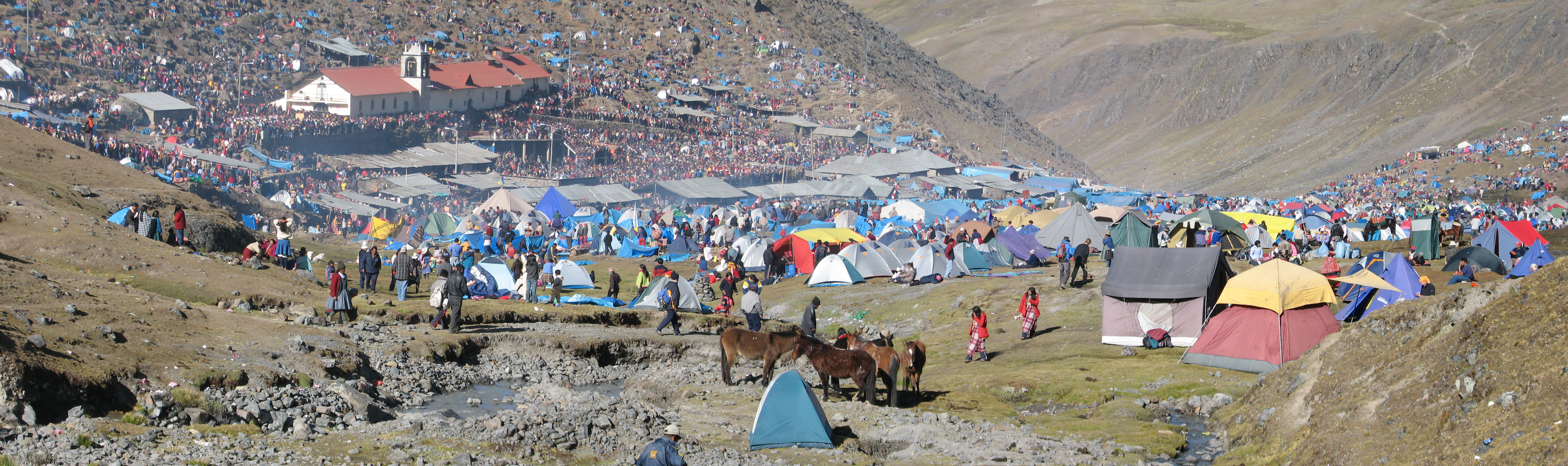
Panoramic view of the festival, with sanctuary church of Sinaqara in background

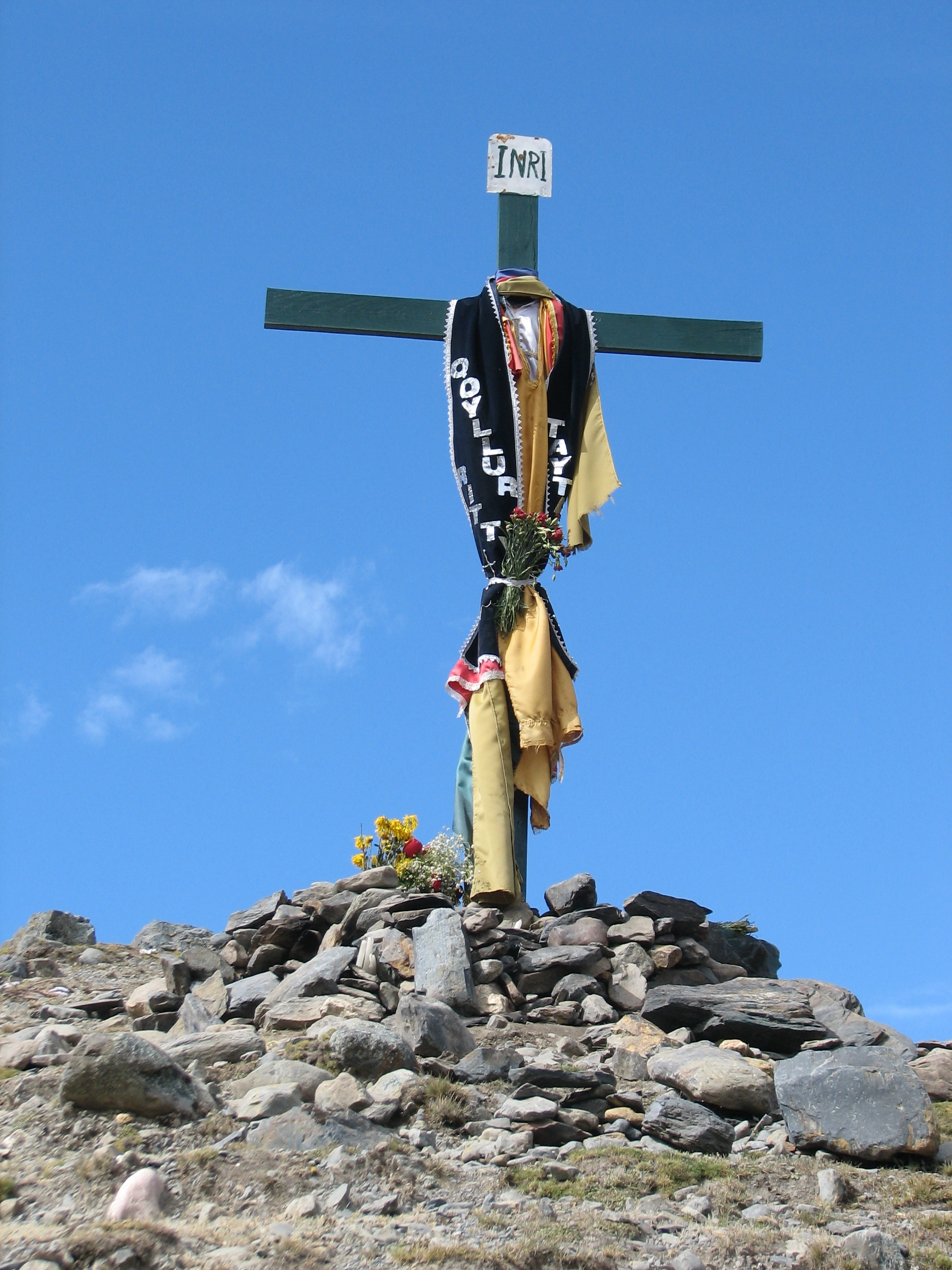
One of the crosses along the road to the Quyllurit'i shrine

The festival is attended by thousands of indigenous people, some of whom come from as far away as Bolivia. The Christian celebration is organized by the Brotherhood of the Lord of Quyllurit'i (Spanish: Hermandad del Señor de Quyllurit'i), a lay organization that also keeps order during the festival. Preparations start on the feast of the Ascension, when the Lord of Quyllurit'i is carried in procession from its chapel at Mahuayani (es) 8 kilometers to its sanctuary at the foot of the Sinaqara mountain (alt. 5,471m).

On the first Wednesday after Pentecost, a second procession carries a statue of Our Lady of Fatima from the Sinaqqara sanctuary to an uphill grotto to prepare for the festival. Most pilgrims arrive by Trinity Sunday, when the Blessed Sacrament is taken in procession through and around the sanctuary.

The following day, the Lord of Qoyllur Rit'i is taken in procession to the grotto of the Virgin and back. Pilgrims refer to this as the greeting between the Lord and Mary, referring to the double traditional Inca feasts of Pariacaca and Oncoy mita. (See section above.) On the night of this second day, dance troupes take turns to perform in the shrine.

At dawn on the third day, ukukus grouped by moieties climb the glaciers on Qullqipunku to retrieve crosses set on top. Some ukukus traditionally spent the night on the glacier to combat spirits. They also cut and bring back blocks of the ice, which is believed to have sacred medicinal qualities. The ukukus are considered to be the only ones capable of dealing with condenados, the cursed souls said to inhabit the snowfields. According to oral traditions, ukukus from different moieties used to engage in ritual battles on the glaciers, but this practice was banned by the Catholic Church. After a mass celebrated later this day, most pilgrims leave the sanctuary. One group carries the Lord of Quyllurit'i in procession to Tayankani before taking it back to Mawallani.

The festival precedes the official feast of Corpus Christi, held the Thursday following Trinity Sunday, but it is closely associated with it.

== See also ==
- Religion in Peru
- Syncretism

== Bibliography ==
- Allen, Catherine. The Hold Life Has: Coca and Cultural Identity in an Andean Community. Washington: Smithsonian Institution Press, 1988.
- Ceruti, Maria Constanza. Qoyllur Riti: etnografia de un peregrinaje ritual de raiz incaica por las altas montañas del Sur de Peru (in Spanish)
- Dean, Carolyn. Inka Bodies and the Body of Christ: Corpus Christi in Colonial Cusco, Peru. Durham: Duke University Press, 1999.
- Randall, Robert. "Qoyllur Rit'i, an Inca fiesta of the Pleiades: reflections on time & space in the Andean world," Bulletin de l'Institut Français d'Etudes Andines 9 (1–2): 37–81 (1982).
- Randall, Robert. "Return of the Pleiades". Natural History 96 (6): 42–53 (June 1987).
- Sallnow, Michael. Pilgrims of the Andes: regional cults in Cusco. Washington: Smithsonian Institution Press, 1987.
