= Callangate =

Mountain in Peru

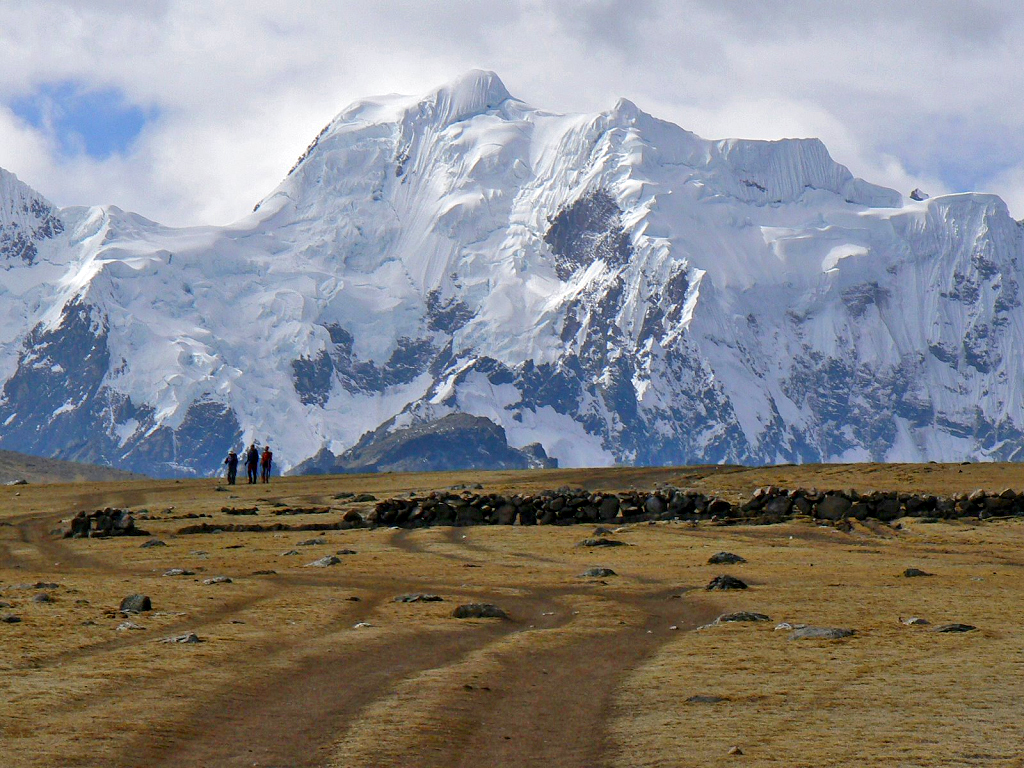

Highest point
- Elevation: 6,110 m (20,050 ft)
- Prominence: 1,403 m (4,603 ft)
- Parent peak: Ausangate
- Coordinates: 13°43′53″S 71°09′36″W

Geography
- Location within Peru
- Location: Cusco Region, Peru
- Parent range: Andes, Vilcanota

Climbing
- First ascent: 30 July 1957, Günther Hauser, Bernhard Kuhn (Germany)

Callangate or Ccallangate is a mountain massif in the Vilcanota mountain range of the Andes in Peru. Its highest point is Collpa Ananta (possibly from Aymara and Quechua qullpa, "saltpeter"), also known as Chimboya, with an elevation of 6,110 metres (20,046 ft). Another peak in the massif is called Ccallangate. It lies in the Cusco Region, Quispicanchi Province, Ocongate District. Collpa Ananta is the second-highest peak in Cusco, and ranks as the 24th highest in Peru.

== First ascent ==
Callangate was first climbed by Germans Günther Hauser and Bernhard Kuhn on 30 July 1957.

== Elevation ==
Other data from available digital elevation models: SRTM 6104 metres. The height of the nearest key col is 4707 meters, leading to a topographic prominence of 1403 meters. Callangate is considered a Mountain Subrange according to the Dominance System and its dominance is 22.96%. Its parent peak is Ausangate and the Topographic isolation is 9.7 kilometers.

== See also ==
- Condoriquiña
- Comercocha
- List of mountains in Peru
- List of mountains in the Andes
