= Lake Singrenacocha =

Lake in Peru

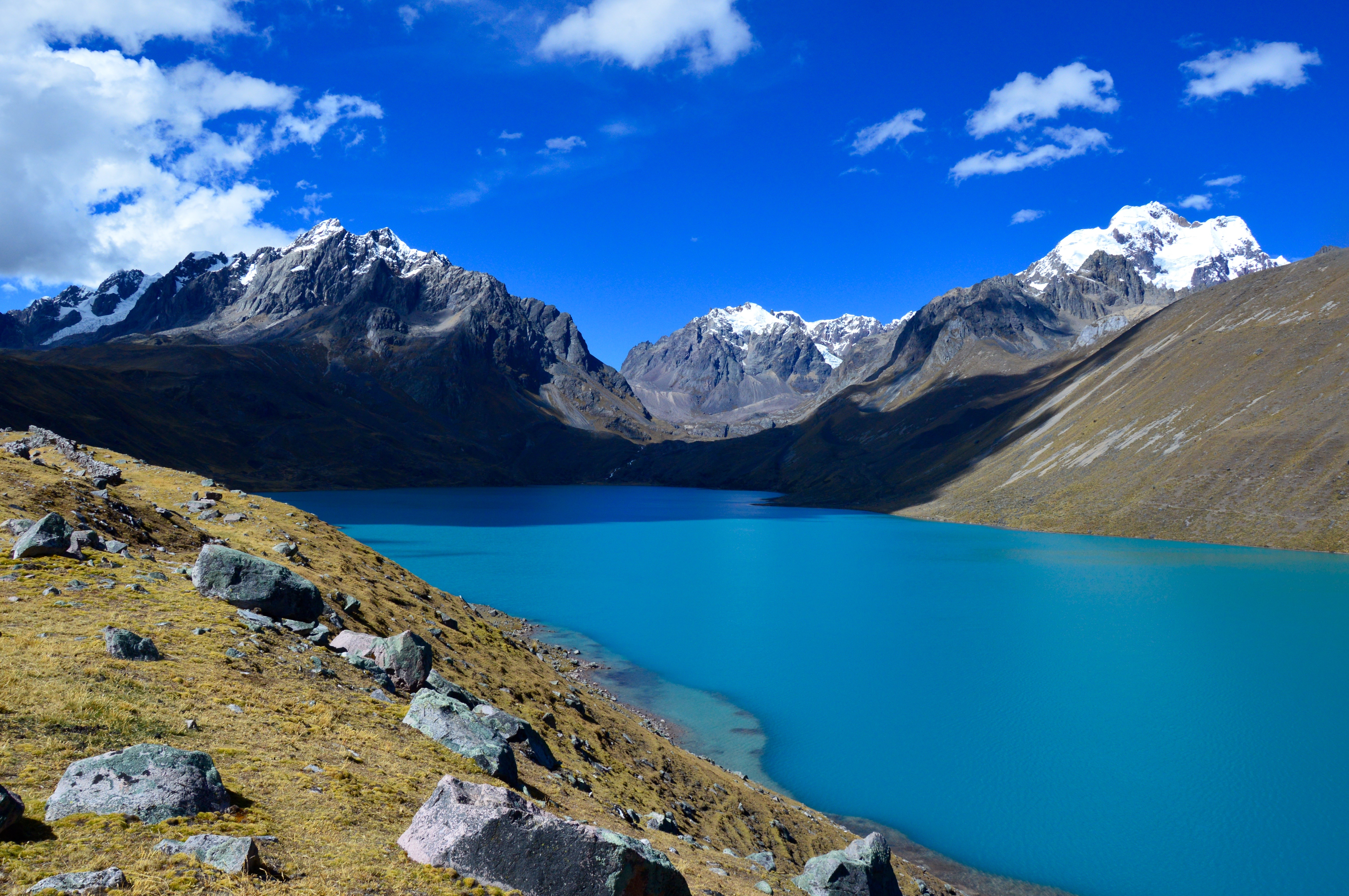
- Lake Singrenacocha (Laguna Sigrinaqocha in Quechua)

- Location within Peru
- Location: Peru; Cusco Region
- Coordinates: 13°39′40″S 71°09′38″W
- Max. length: 3.82 km (2.37 mi)
- Max. width: 0.88 km (0.55 mi)
- Surface elevation: 4,377 m (14,360 ft)

Lake Singrenacocha (possibly from Quechua sinkriy to walk in a line / to string, sikriy, sinri to string beads, -na a suffix, qucha lake) or Sigrenacocha is a lake in Peru located in the Cusco Region, Quispicanchi Province, Ocongate District. It is situated at a height of about 4,377 metres (14,360 ft), about 3.82 km long and 0.88 km at its widest point.2.78 km2. Singrenacocha lies in the Vilcanota mountain range, northwest of the larger Lake Sibinacocha and north of the Callangate massif.
