= Quispicanchi province =

Coordinates: 13°42′00″S 71°38′24″W

Quispicanchi
- Province
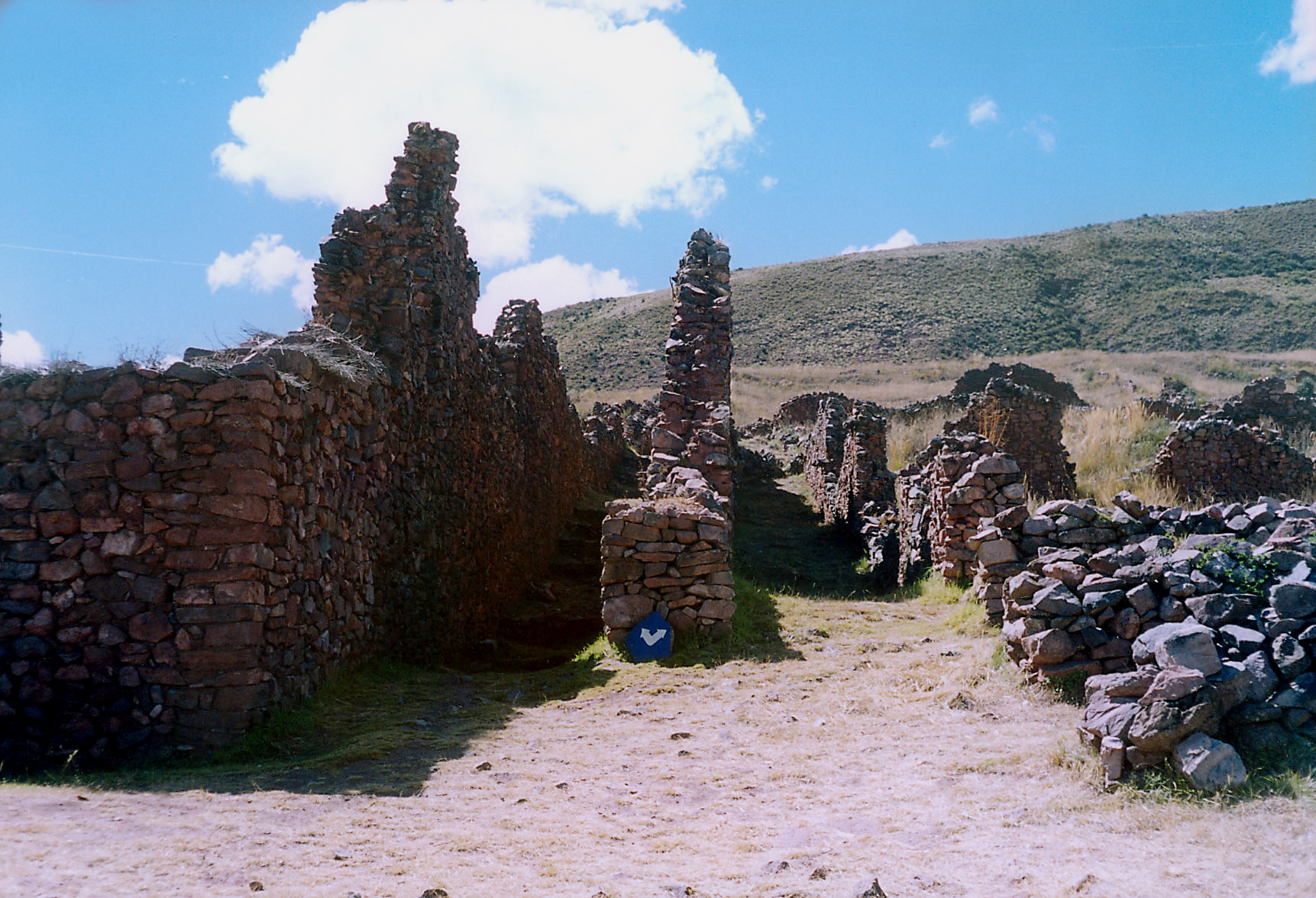
- Pikillaqta

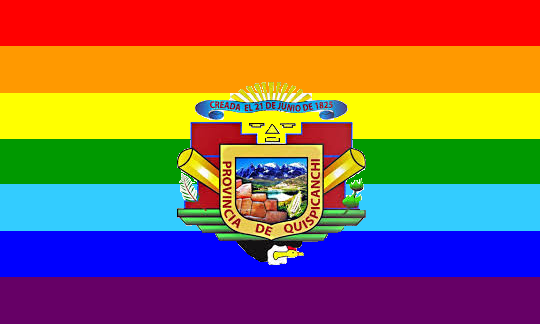
- Flag

- Location of Quispicanchi in the Cusco Region
- Country: Peru
- Region: Cusco
- Capital: Urcos

Government
  - Mayor: Manuel Jesús Sutta Pfocco

Area
  - Total: 7,564.79 km^{2} (2,920.78 sq mi)

Population
  - Total: 87,430
  - Density: 11.56/km^{2} (29.93/sq mi)
- UBIGEO: 0812

Quispicanchi is one of thirteen provinces in the Cusco Region in the southern highlands of Peru.

== Geography ==
The province of Quispicanchi is bounded to the north by the province of Paucartambo and the Madre de Dios Region, to the east by the Puno Region, to the south by the province of Canchis, and to the west by the provinces of Acomayo, Paruro and Cusco.

The Willkanuta mountain range traverses the province. Some of the highest peaks of the province are Ausangate, Chumpi and Qullpa Ananta. Other mountains are listed below:

- Allin Qhapaq
- Ananta
- Anka Wachana
- Anka Wachanan
- Anta P'unqu
- Antaymarka
- Apu K'uchu
- Chachakumani
- Chachakumayuq
- Chiri Unuyuq
- Chuqurusi
- Chhuxlluni
- Ch'aqu
- Ch'uñuna
- Hapu Punta
- Hatun Allpapata
- Hatun Ch'aqu
- Hatun Punta
- Hatun Rit'iyuq
- Hatun Wayq'u
- Huch'uy Ananta
- Istalla
- Jach'a Sira
- Jaqhichuwa
- Kicha Qaqa
- Kimsachata
- Kiswarniyuq
- Kuntur Ikiña
- Kuntur Sinqa
- Khuchi Salla
- K'ark'apata
- Luychu Urqu
- Llusk'a Rit'i
- Machu Apachita
- Mamanlipani
- Minasniyuq
- Mulluqucha
- Pachatusan
- Pararani
- Piki Mach'ay
- Pinchimuru
- Pirwani
- Puka Punta
- Puka Salla
- Pukaqucha
- Pukayuq
- Phaq'u
- P'isqiyuq
- P'uykutuni
- Qanchis Kancha
- Qaqa Chaka
- Qillqata
- Qiwllaqucha
- Qullpa Qaqa (Cusco-Puno)
- Qullpa Qaqa (Huch'uy Ananta)
- Qullpa Qaqa (Marcapata)
- Qullqip'unqu
- Quri (Paucartambo)
- Quri (Quiquijana)
- Quri Pukara
- Qusqu Qhawarina
- Q'illu Kunka
- Q'illu Wallayuq
- Q'iwisiri
- Q'iwisiri (Marcapata)
- Sallaqucha
- Sanimayu
- Saqsa Ananta
- Sullulluni
- Suyu Parina
- Tiklla Q'asa
- Tikllaqucha
- Tuqllayuq
- Tuqtu
- Uña Pakana
- Urqu Puñuna
- Usqullu Ananta
- Wallpa Qaqa
- Wamanripani
- Wamanripayuq
- Wanakuni
- Waracha
- Wari Sayana
- Wasaqucha
- Waypun
- Wayruruni
- Wila Jaqhi
- Wila Sirka
- Wilaquta
- Willulluni
- Wiraqucha
- Wiskana
- Wisk'achani (Camanti-Marcapata)
- Wisk'achani (Cusco-Puno)
- Yana Qaqa
- Yana Q'asa
- Yana Urqu (Hapu Punta)
- Yana Urqu (Jaqhichuwa)
- Yana Urqu (Mullu P'unqu)
- Yana Urqu (Ocongate-Quiquijana)
- Yana Urqu (Q'umirqucha)
- Yana Urqu (Yayamari)
- Yanaqucha
- Yuraq Kancha
- Yuraq Qaqa
- Yuraq Q'asa

Siwinaqucha and Sinkrinaqucha belong to the largest lakes of the province.

== Political division ==
The province is divided into twelve districts (Spanish: distritos, singular: distrito), each of which is headed by a mayor (alcalde). The districts, with their capitals in parentheses, are:

- Andahuaylillas (Andahuaylillas)
- Camanti (Quince Mil)
- Ccarhuayo (Ccarhuayo)
- Ccatca (Ccatca)
- Cusipata (Cusipata)
- Huaro (Huaro)
- Lucre (Lucre)
- Marcapata (Marcapata)
- Ocongate (Ocongate)
- Oropesa (Oropesa)
- Quiquijana (Quiquijana)
- Urcos (Urcos)

== Ethnic groups ==
The people in the province are mainly indigenous citizens of Quechua descent. Quechua is the language which the majority of the population (75.35%) learnt to speak in childhood, 24.29% of the residents started speaking using the Spanish language (2007 Peru Census).

== See also ==
- Armaqucha
- Chuqi Pukyu
- Pachamama Raymi
- Pikillaqta
- Quyllur Urmana
- Q'umirqucha (Camanti)
- Q'umirqucha (Q'umir Qucha)
- Q'umirqucha (Yanaq Qusqu K'uchu)
- Pukaqucha
- Rumiqullqa
- T'anta Raymi
- Warurumiqucha
