= Jolljepunco =

Mountain in Peru near Cusco

- Sasahui
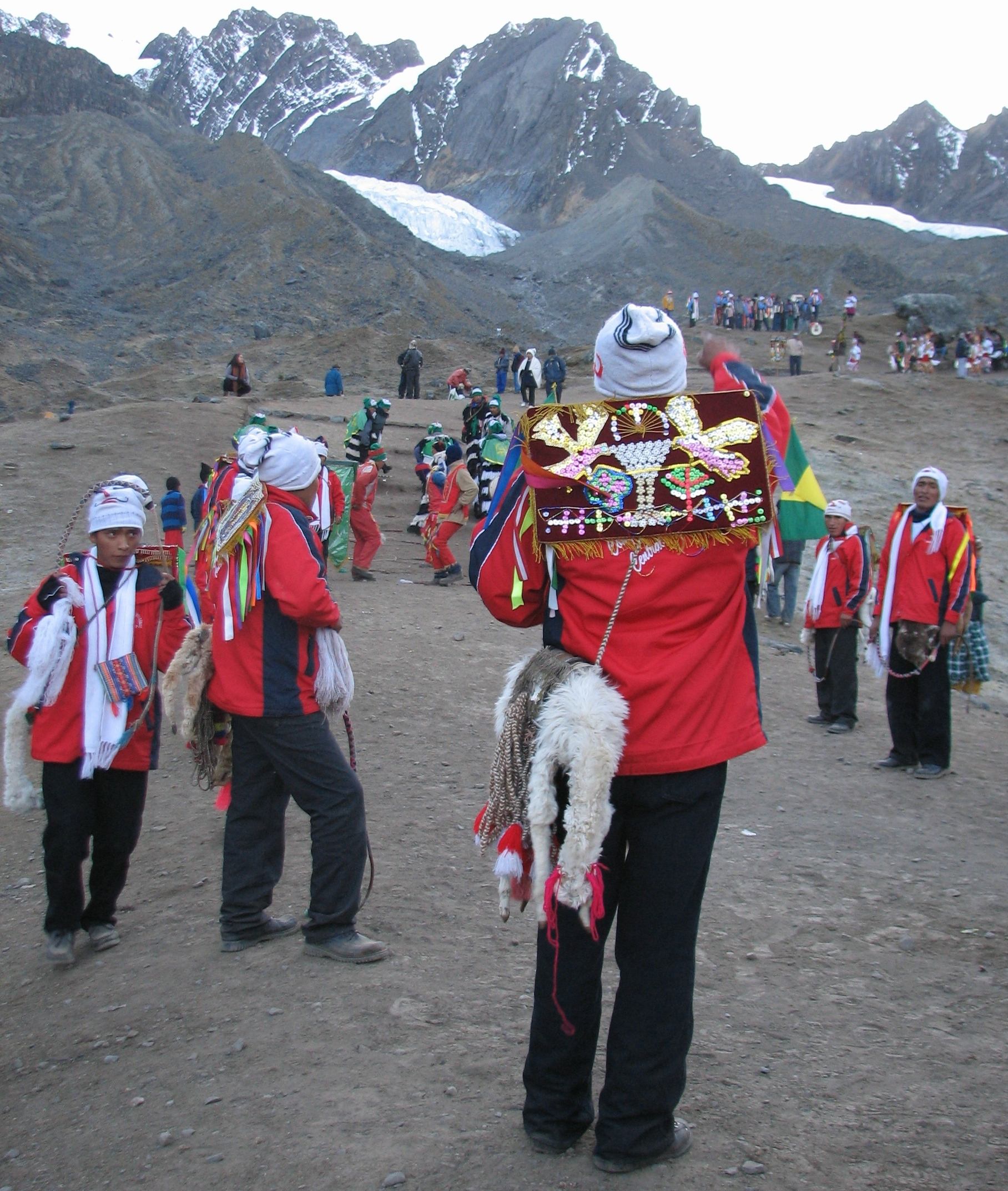
- Quyllur Rit'i festival at the foothills of Cinajara and Jolljepunco

Highest point
- Elevation: 5,522 m (18,117 ft)
- Coordinates: 13°31′09″S 71°12′24″W

Geography
- Location within Peru
- Location: Peru, Cusco Region
- Parent range: Andes, Vilcanota

Climbing
- First ascent: 1-1961

Jolljepunco (possibly from Quechua qullqi money, silver, p'unqu pond, reservoir, tank; dam, "silver pond"), Colquepunco (possibly from Quechua punku door, "silver door") or Sasahui (sasawi) local name for Leucheria daucifolia, -ni an Aymara suffix to indicate ownership, "the one with the sasawi plant", Hispanicized Sasahuini) is a mountain in the Andes of Peru and the name of a lake near the peak. The mountain is about 5,522 metres (18,117 ft) high. It is situated in the northern extensions of the Vilcanota mountain range in the Cusco Region, Quispicanchi Province, in the districts Ccarhuayo and Ocongate and in the Paucartambo Province, Kosñipata District. Jolljepunco lies northwest of the lake Singrenacocha, southeast of Minasnioc. The lake named Jolljepunco is situated south of the mountain at 13°32′04″S 71°12′29″W.

The annual Quyllur Rit'i festival takes place at the foot of the mountains Jolljepunco and Cinajara. The ukukus (Cusco Quechua ukuku spectacled bear (or just 'bear'), also a character in the Andean mythology) of all the groups climb the glaciers of Jolljepunco and spend the night there. They return, carrying on their backs huge ice blocks for the people of their community. The waters of the mountain are believed to heal the body and the mind.
