= Q'illu Q'asa =

Mountain in Peru

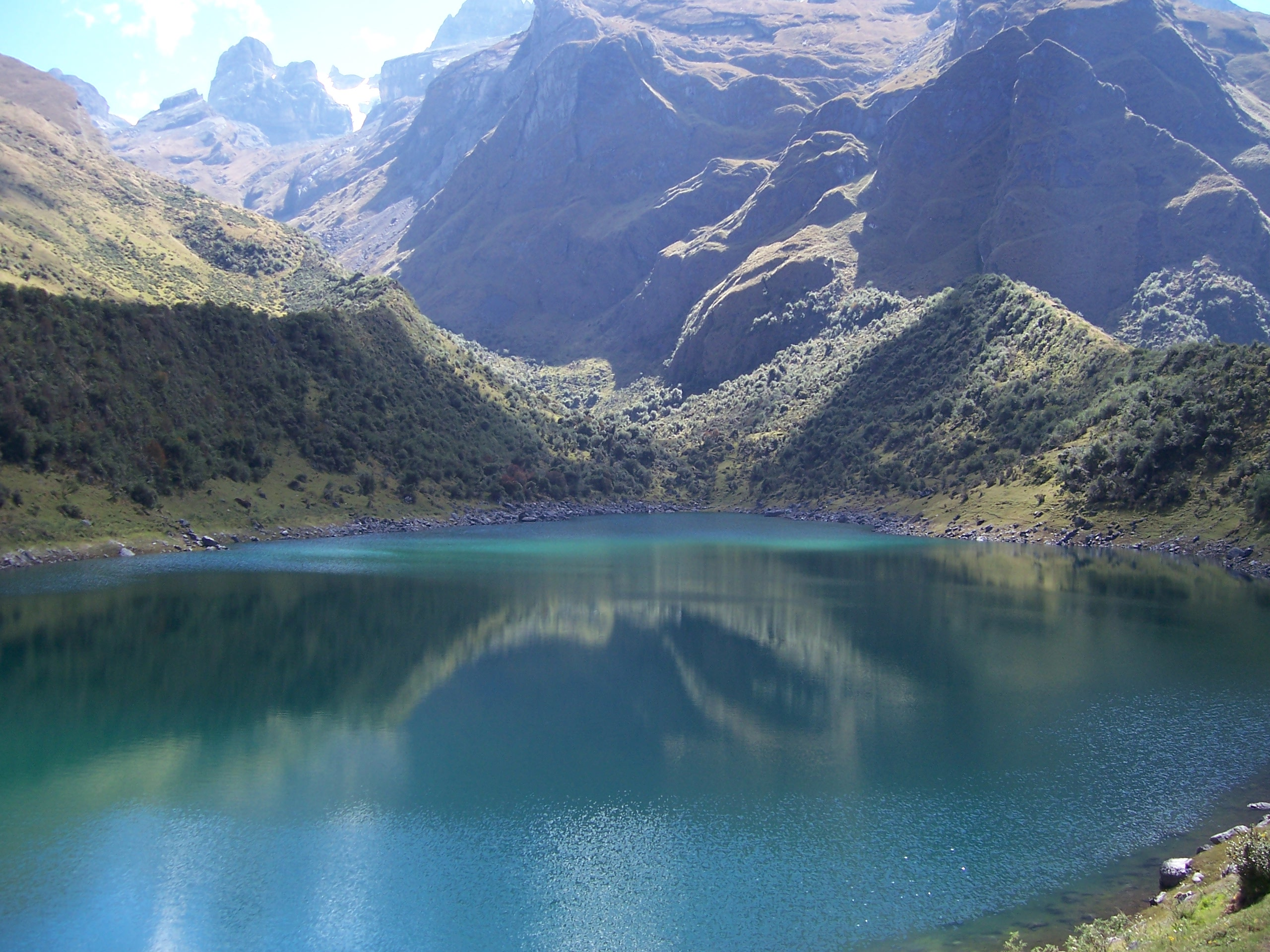
- Ampay (in the background on the left) and the eastern slope of Q'illu Q'asa in front of it as seen from Usphaqucha

Highest point
- Elevation: 5,000 m (16,000 ft)
- Coordinates: 13°34′30″S 72°55′06″W

Geography
- Location within Peru
- Location: Peru, Apurímac Region
- Parent range: Andes

Q'illu Q'asa (Quechua q'illu yellow, q'asa mountain pass, "yellow mountain pass", hispanicized spelling Jellojasa) is a mountain in the Andes of Peru, about 5,000 metres (16,404 ft) high. It is located in the Apurímac Region, Abancay Province, on the border of the districts of Abancay and Tamburco. Q'illu Q'asa lies southeast of Ampay and west of a lake named Usphaqucha.

== See also ==
- Ampay National Sanctuary
