= Abancay (disambiguation) =

Abancay is a city in southern-central Peru.

Abancay may also refer to:

- Abancay Province, a province in the Apurímac Region
- Abancay District, a district in the Abancay province
