= Huanipaca District =

Coordinates: 13°30′04″S 72°56′18″W

Huanipaca
- District
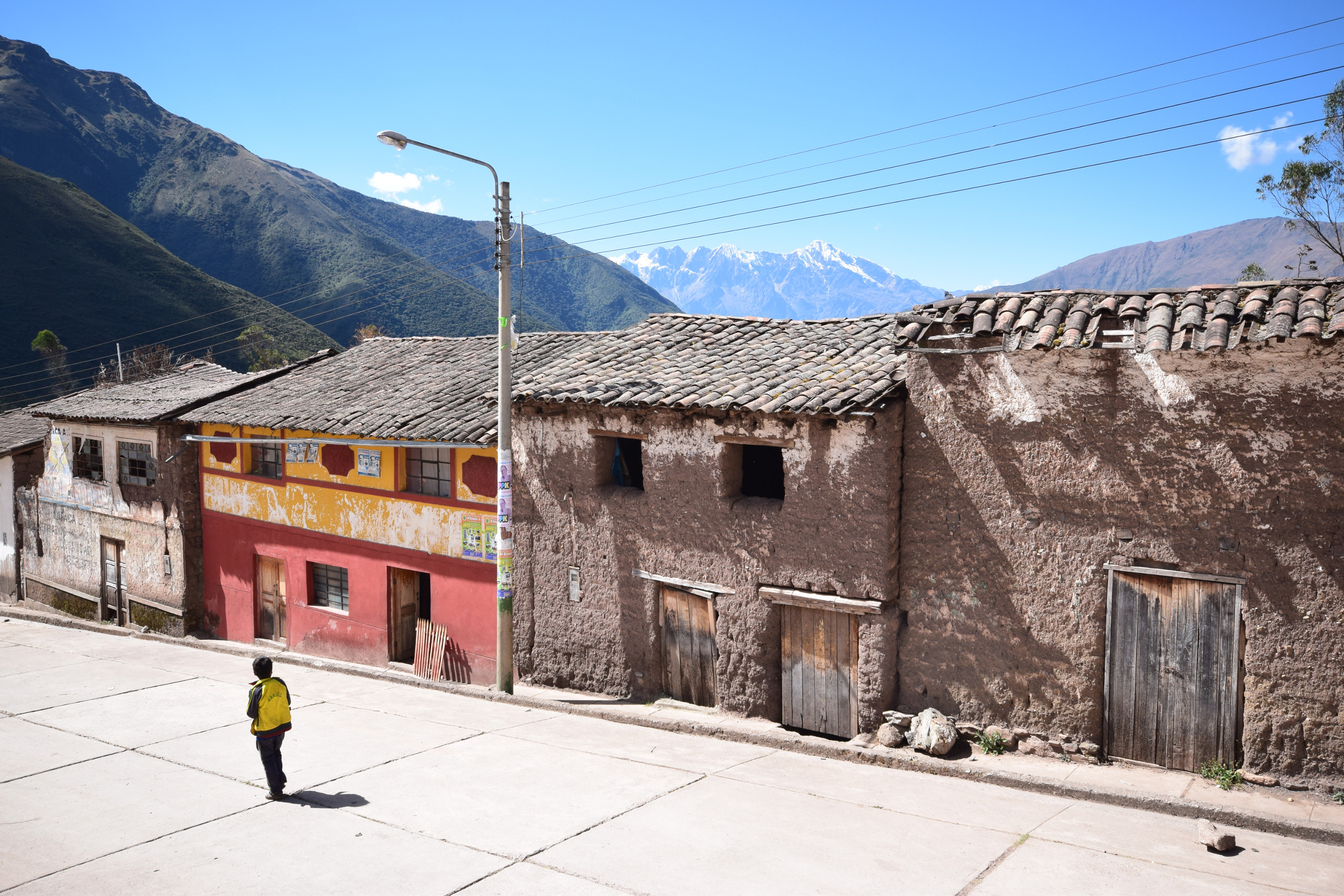
- Haunipaca, Apurimac
- Interactive map of Huanipaca
- Country: Peru
- Region: Apurímac
- Province: Abancay
- Founded: November 21, 1893
- Capital: Huanipaca

Government
  - Mayor: Jose Chacon Vargas

Area
  - Total: 432.62 km^{2} (167.04 sq mi)
- Elevation: 3,150 m (10,330 ft)

Population (2005 census)
  - Total: 5,257
  - Density: 12.15/km^{2} (31.47/sq mi)
- Time zone: UTC-5 (PET)
- UBIGEO: 030105

Huanipaca District is one of the nine districts of the Abancay Province in Peru.

== Geography ==
One of the highest peaks of the district is Ampay at 5,236 m (17,178 ft) located in the Ampay National Sanctuary. Other mountains are listed below:

- Ch'uñuna
- Ch'uspirqa
- Inka Wasi
- Jayuri
- K'usilluyuq
- Qucha Urqu
- Qullqa Pata
- Suchuna Pata
- T'asta Q'asa

== Ethnic groups ==
The people in the district are mainly indigenous citizens of Quechua descent. Quechua is the language which the majority of the population (77.81%) learnt to speak in childhood, 21.41% of the residents started speaking using the Spanish language (2007 Peru Census).

== See also ==
- Qurimarka
