= Tamburco District =

Coordinates: 13°37′01″S 72°52′16″W

Tamburco Tampurqu
- District
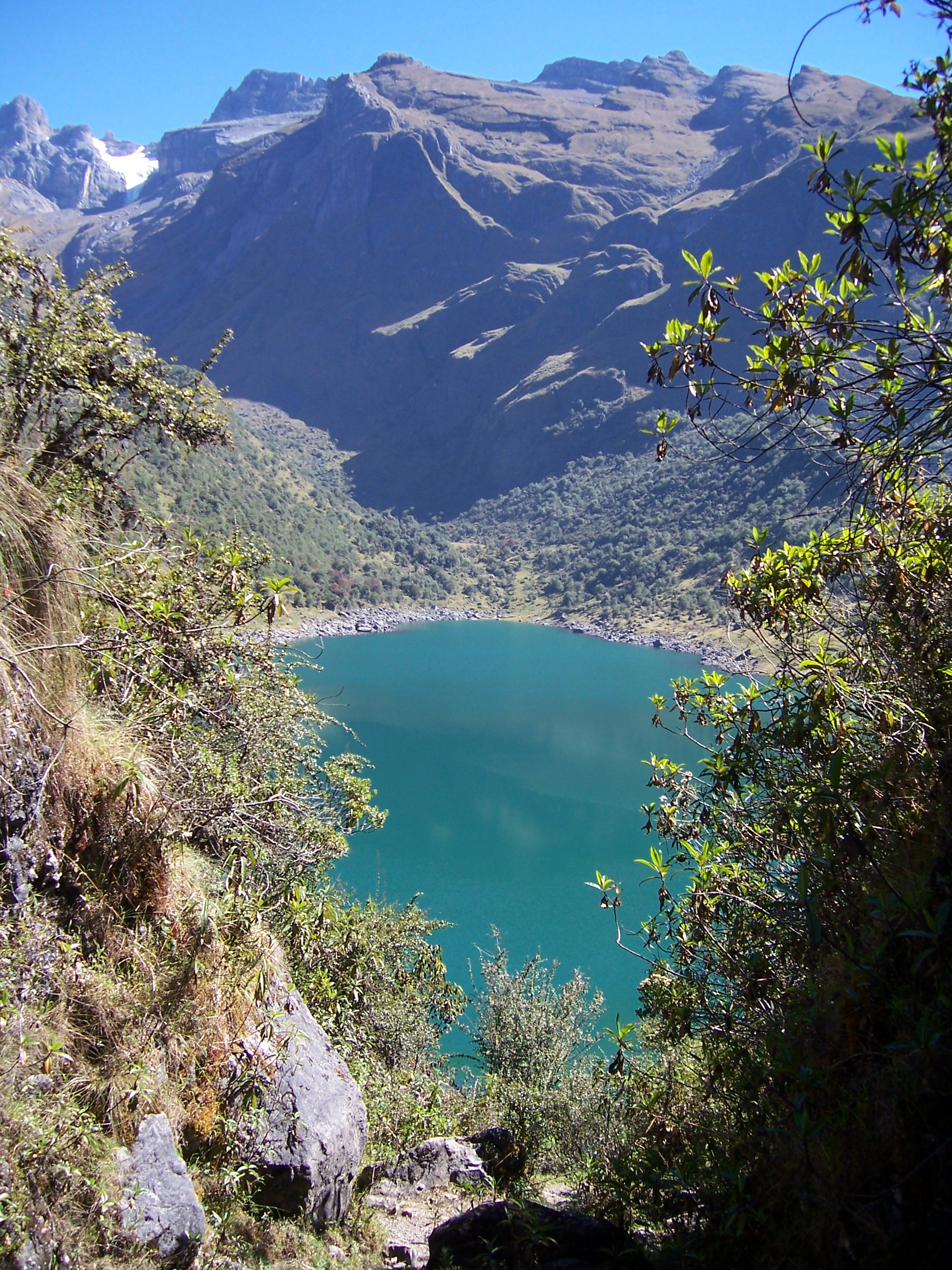
- Ampay (in the background on the left) as seen from Usphaqucha
- Interactive map of Tamburco
- Country: Peru
- Region: Apurímac
- Province: Abancay
- Founded: December 31, 1941
- Capital: Tamburco

Government
  - Mayor: Fernando Zuñiga Gutierrez

Area
  - Total: 54.6 km^{2} (21.1 sq mi)
- Elevation: 2,581 m (8,468 ft)

Population (2005 census)
  - Total: 7,216
  - Density: 132/km^{2} (342/sq mi)
- Time zone: UTC-5 (PET)
- UBIGEO: 030109

Tamburco District is one of the nine districts of the province Abancay in Peru.

== Climate ==
Climate data for Granja San Antonio, Tamburco, elevation 2,772 m (9,094 ft), (1991–2020)
Month	Jan	Feb	Mar	Apr	May	Jun	Jul	Aug	Sep	Oct	Nov	Dec	Year
Mean daily maximum °C (°F)	20.9 (69.6)	20.2 (68.4)	20.3 (68.5)	20.4 (68.7)	20.9 (69.6)	20.3 (68.5)	20.3 (68.5)	21.1 (70.0)	22.2 (72.0)	22.6 (72.7)	23.3 (73.9)	21.7 (71.1)	21.2 (70.1)
Mean daily minimum °C (°F)	8.9 (48.0)	8.8 (47.8)	8.8 (47.8)	8.3 (46.9)	7.3 (45.1)	6.6 (43.9)	6.0 (42.8)	6.8 (44.2)	8.3 (46.9)	8.7 (47.7)	9.1 (48.4)	9.0 (48.2)	8.0 (46.5)
Average precipitation mm (inches)	198.5 (7.81)	256.5 (10.10)	97.4 (3.83)	50.1 (1.97)	15.2 (0.60)	8.6 (0.34)	8.6 (0.34)	23.0 (0.91)	15.4 (0.61)	58.2 (2.29)	64.4 (2.54)	129.2 (5.09)	925.1 (36.43)
Source: National Meteorology and Hydrology Service of Peru

== See also ==
- Ampay
- Ampay National Sanctuary
- Q'illu Q'asa
- Usphaqucha
- Usnu Muqu
