= Sondor (Abancay-Antabamba) =

Mountain in Peru

- Location within Peru

Highest point
- Elevation: 4,800 m (15,700 ft)
- Coordinates: 14°07′27″S 72°58′29″W

Geography
- Location: Peru, Apurímac Region
- Parent range: Andes

Sondor (possibly from Aymara sunturu square (house) without a ridge, Quechua suntur circular, is a mountain in the Andes of Peru, about 4,800 metres (15,748 ft) high. It is located in the Apurímac Region, Abancay Province, Circa District, and in the Antabamba Province, El Oro District. It lies southeast of a mountain named Sunturu.
