= Sayhuite =

Archaeological site in Peru

- Saywite
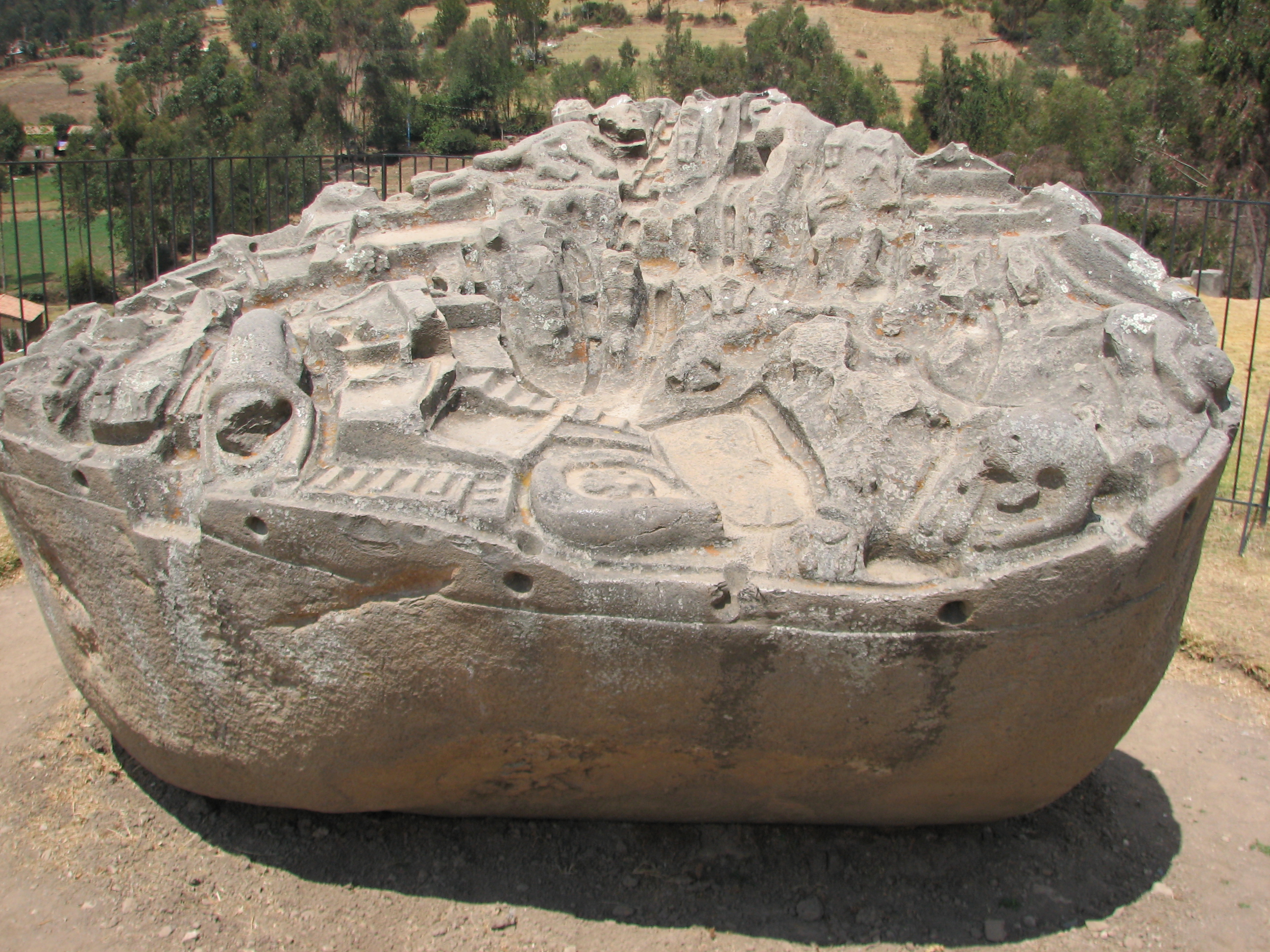
- The Sayhuite monolith

- Location within Peru
- 13°32′50″S 72°48′10″W
- Type: Sanctuary
- Location: Curahuasi, Abancay Province, Apurímac Region, Peru
- Region: Andes

Sayhuite is an archaeological site 47 kilometres (29 mi) east of the city Abancay, about 3 hours away from the city of Cusco, in the province Abancay in the region Apurímac in Peru. The site is regarded as a center of religious worship for Inca people, focusing on water. In the Monuments of the Inca by John Hemming, Hemming points to a colonial narrative that describes the interior of the Sayhuite temple. The temple featured larger columns draped in fabrics with gold bands the "thickness of one's hand." The temple was also under the care of the priestess Asarpay, who jumped to her death in the nearby 400 meter gorge to avoid capture by Spanish forces.

== Monolith ==
An important feature on the site is the Sayhuite monolith, an enormous rock containing more than 200 geometric and zoomorphic figures, including reptiles, frogs, and felines. Found at the top of a hill named Concacha, the stone was sculpted as a topographical hydraulic model, complete with terraces, ponds, rivers, tunnels, and irrigation channels. About two meters long, and four meters wide, the monolith is the most popular attraction at the archaeological site.

=== Significance of the monolith ===
While the creators remain a mystery, the monolith provides archaeologists with insight into the culture of the pre-Columbian population. Archaeologists have determined that the site was an Incan religious center, where rituals and ceremonies for the worship of water was conducted. The monolith is an important clue to this, since it depicts a water-like flow between the carvings. Archaeologist Gary Urton states that "Carvings in its upper part represent terraces, irrigation canals, pumas, and other animals, such as lizards." and that it may be a symbolic representation of the valley.
