= Qiwllaqucha (Abancay) =

Lake in Peru

- Location within Peru
- Location: Peru; Apurímac Region, Abancay Province
- Coordinates: 13°57′48″S 72°48′48″W

Qiwllaqucha (Quechua qillwa, qiwlla, qiwiña gull, qucha lake, "gull lake", also spelled Keullacocha) is a small lake in Peru located in the Apurímac Region, Abancay Province, Circa District, southwest of the mountain Pituni.

== See also ==
- Wask'aqucha
