= Pichirhua District =

Coordinates: 13°51′47″S 73°04′23″W

Pichirhua Pichirwa
- District
- Interactive map of Pichirhua
- Country: Peru
- Region: Apurímac
- Province: Abancay
- Founded: November 19, 1839
- Capital: Pichirhua

Government
  - Mayor: Marcelino Montes Aguilar

Area
  - Total: 370.69 km^{2} (143.12 sq mi)
- Elevation: 2,726 m (8,944 ft)

Population (2005 census)
  - Total: 4,564
  - Density: 12.31/km^{2} (31.89/sq mi)
- Time zone: UTC-5 (PET)
- UBIGEO: 030107

Pichirhua District is one of the nine districts of the Abancay Province in Peru.

== Geography ==
One of the highest peaks of the district is Kuntur Sinqa at approximately 4,400 m (14,400 ft). Other mountains are listed below:

- Aqu Marka
- Aqu Q'asa
- Ch'ampa Qucha
- Ch'uñuna
- Hatun Waswalla
- Kimsa P'ukru
- Layanniyuq
- Lilayuq
- Puka Kunka
- Qucha Urqu
- Quncha Pallana
- Tuku Sinqa
- Usnu Muqu
- Wisk'achayuq

== Ethnic groups ==
The people in the district are mainly indigenous citizens of Quechua descent. Quechua is the language which the majority of the population (77.34%) learnt to speak in childhood, 22.25% of the residents started speaking using the Spanish language (2007 Peru Census).
