= Abancay District =

Coordinates: 13°38′02″S 72°52′52″W

Abancay
- District
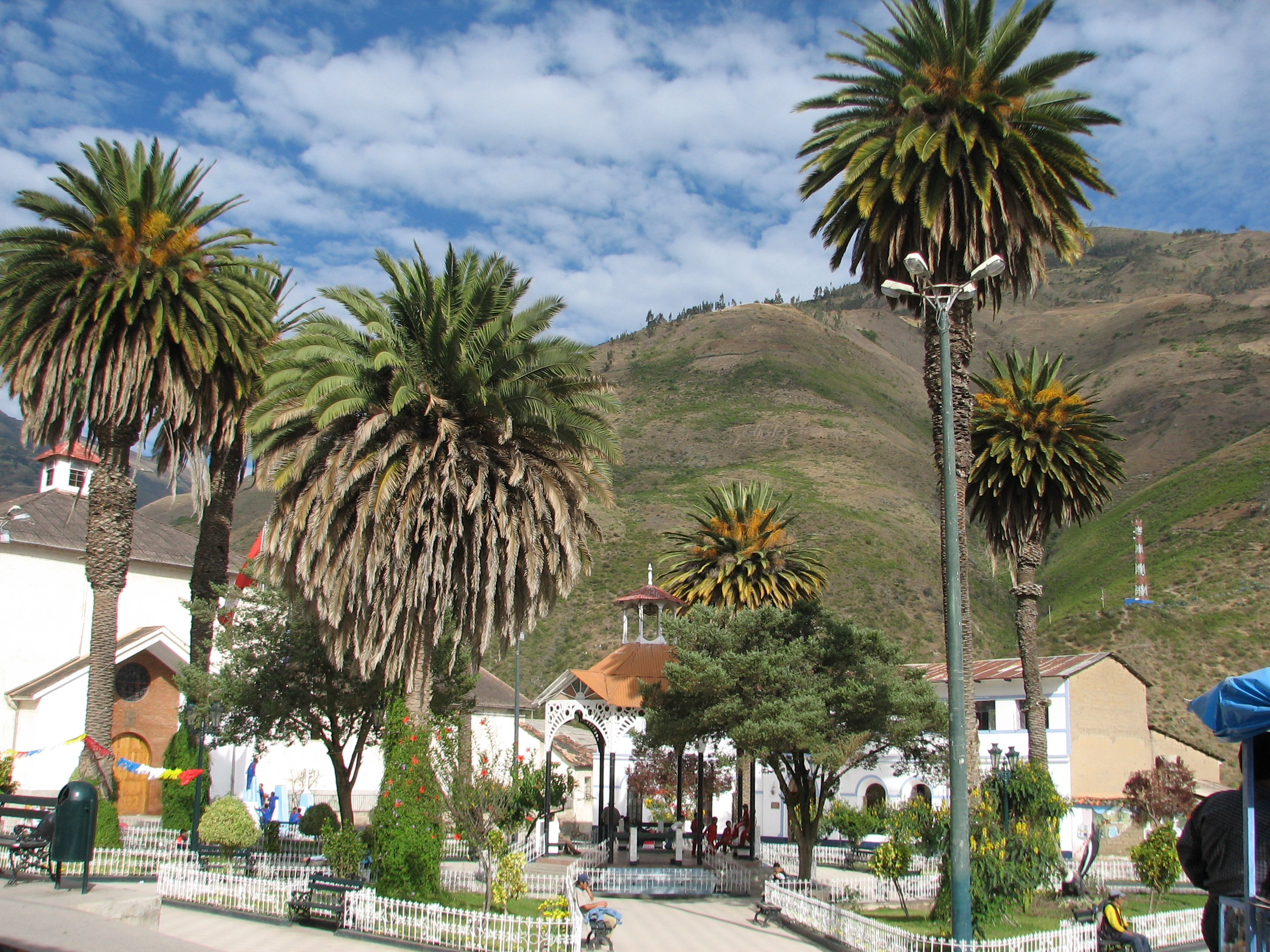

- Location of Abancay in the Abancay province
- Country: Peru
- Region: Apurímac
- Province: Abancay
- Capital: Abancay

Government
  - Mayor: Guido Chahuaylla Maldonado (2019 - 2022)

Area
  - Total: 313.07 km^{2} (120.88 sq mi)
- Elevation: 2,378 m (7,802 ft)

Population (2005 census)
  - Total: 54,180
  - Density: 173.1/km^{2} (448.2/sq mi)
- Time zone: UTC-5 (PET)
- UBIGEO: 030101

Abancay District is one of the nine districts of the Abancay Province in Peru.

== Geography ==
Some of the highest mountains of the district are listed below:

- Allqa Marka
- Ampay
- Ichhu Urqu
- Inka Pirqa
- Kunturillu
- Muruqucha
- P'unqu Q'asa
- Q'illu Q'asa
- Sunturuyuq
- Waraquyuq
- Wayllayuq
- Wiraqucha
- Wisk'achayuq

== See also ==
- Ampay National Sanctuary
