= El Oro District =

Coordinates: 14°12′29″S 73°03′58″W

- District
- Interactive map of El Oro District
- Country: Peru
- Region: Apurímac
- Province: Antabamba
- Founded: August 18, 1961
- Capital: Ayahuay

Government
  - Mayor: Nicanor Oswaldo Quispe Lopez

Area
  - Total: 68.81 km^{2} (26.57 sq mi)
- Elevation: 3,280 m (10,760 ft)

Population (2005 census)
  - Total: 509
  - Density: 7.40/km^{2} (19.2/sq mi)
- Time zone: UTC-5 (PET)
- UBIGEO: 030302

El Oro District is one of the seven districts of the province Antabamba in Peru.

== Ethnic groups ==
The people in the district are mainly indigenous citizens of Quechua descent. Quechua is the language which the majority of the population (79.88%) learnt to speak in childhood, 19.92% of the residents started speaking using the Spanish language (2007 Peru Census).

== See also ==
- Suntur
