= Chacoche District =

Coordinates: 13°56′53″S 72°59′28″W

Chacoche
- District
- Interactive map of Chacoche
- Country: Peru
- Region: Apurímac
- Province: Abancay
- Founded: December 28, 1961
- Capital: Chacoche

Government
  - Mayor: Martin Puma Cayllahua

Area
  - Total: 186.1 km^{2} (71.9 sq mi)
- Elevation: 3,433 m (11,263 ft)

Population (2005 census)
  - Total: 1,381
  - Density: 7.421/km^{2} (19.22/sq mi)
- Time zone: UTC-5 (PET)
- UBIGEO: 030102

Chacoche District is one of the nine districts of the Abancay Province in Peru.

== Geography ==
One of the highest peaks of the district is Wik'uña Wat'a at approximately 4,600 m (15,100 ft). Other mountains are listed below:

- Antaq Allpa
- Inti Waman
- Kuntur Llapana
- Kuntur Pampa
- Llulluch'ani
- Nina Urqu
- Pinqulluni
- Puka Ch'ullu
- Qiwña P'ukru
- Surimana
- Tirani
- Tuqtuqa
- Uya Uya
- Wanathi Uma
- Yana Qucha
- Yawriwiri

== Ethnic groups ==
The people in the district are mainly indigenous citizens of Quechua descent. Quechua is the language which the majority of the population (68.89%) learnt to speak in childhood, 30.76% of the residents started speaking using the Spanish language (2007 Peru Census).
