= David Salazar (politician) =

Peruvian politician

David Abraham Salazar

3rd Governor of Apurímac
- In office January 1, 2007 – December 31, 2010
- Preceded by: Rosa Suárez Aliaga
- Succeeded by: Elías Segovia Ruiz

Personal details
- Born: 12 June 1953 (age 73) Andahuaylas, Apurímac, Peru
- Party: Frente Popular Llapanchik; Popular Alliance (2015-2016)
- Education: Universidad Nacional Mayor de San Marcos

David Abraham Salazar Morote is a Peruvian politician. He has served as Governor of the Apurímac Region from 2007 to 2010. In 2015, he was assigned to be part of Alan García's Popular Alliance presidential ticket with Lourdes Flores. García received 6% of the popular vote, dissolving the alliance.

Salazar is also the leader of the regional movement "Frente Popular Llapanchik".

== Biography ==
He was born in the city of Talavera, Peru, on June 12, 1953. He completed his primary studies in the town of Ongoy and the city of Talavera. High school began in Andahuaylas and culminated in the Leoncio Prado Military College, in El Callao, in 1969. Between 1970 and 1982 he studied industrial engineering at the Universidad Nacional Mayor de San Marcos. He has developed his professional life in the public and private sectors.
