= Qurimarka, Apurímac =

Archaeological site in Peru

Qurimarka
- Location: Peru, Apurímac Region, Cotabambas Province

Qurimarka (Quechua quri gold, marka village / storey) is an archaeological site in Peru. It is situated in the Apurímac Region, Abancay Province, Huanipaca District.

== See also ==
- Inka Raqay
