= Usnu Muqu =

Archaeological site in Peru

- Interactive map of Usnu Muqu
- 13°37′16″S 72°52′20″W
- Location: Peru, Apurímac Region

Usnu Muqu (Quechua usnu altar; a special platform for important celebrations, muqu hill, "usnu hill", also spelled Usno Moqo, Usnomoqo) is an archaeological site in Peru. It is located in the Apurímac Region, Abancay Province, Tamburco District, near the main square of Tamburco.
