= Circa District =

Coordinates: 13°52′26″S 72°52′23″W

Circa Sirka
- District
- Interactive map of Circa
- Country: Peru
- Region: Apurímac
- Province: Abancay
- Capital: Circa

Government
  - Mayor: Asunto Gregorio Montoya Juro

Area
  - Total: 641.68 km^{2} (247.75 sq mi)
- Elevation: 3,120 m (10,240 ft)

Population (2005 census)
  - Total: 3,105
  - Density: 4.839/km^{2} (12.53/sq mi)
- Time zone: UTC-5 (PET)
- UBIGEO: 030103

Circa (hispanicized spelling of Sirka, Aymara for vein of the body or a mine) is one of the nine districts of the Abancay Province in the Apurímac Region in Peru.

== Geography ==
Some of the highest mountains of the district are listed below:

- Aklla Wasi
- Aqu Q'asa
- Atuq Pata
- Chakana
- Chaku Urqu
- Chawpi
- Chuntani
- Hatun Ullukuyuq
- Huch'uy Q'urawiri
- Jach’a Marka
- Kimsa P'unqu
- Kimsa Wayna
- Kuntur Llapana
- Kuntur Pampa
- Kuntur Uta
- Kunturi Marka
- K’ayrawi
- K’awa Pallana
- Llaksa
- Llikawi
- Mawk'allaqta
- Nina Urqu
- Pillpintu
- Pinqulluni
- Pisqa Qucha
- Pukara
- Qala Saywa
- Qillqas
- Qiñwa Marka
- Qiñwa Urqu
- Qucha Pata
- Qumiñawi
- Q’ala Chukchu
- Q'urawiri
- Rumi Chaka
- Sawsayuq
- Sunqun Marka
- Suntur
- Sura Pata
- Uqhu Pata
- Warisqa
- Warmi Rumi
- Wik'uña Wat'a
- Willkawara
- Yana Qaqa
- Yana Urqu

== Ethnic groups ==
The people in the district are mainly indigenous citizens of Quechua descent. Quechua is the language which the majority of the population (79.43%) learnt to speak in childhood, 20.14% of the residents started speaking using the Spanish language (2007 Peru Census).

== See also ==
- Qiwllaqucha
- Wask'aqucha
