= Huch'uy Q'urawiri =

Mountain in Peru

- Location within Peru

Highest point
- Elevation: 4,800 m (15,700 ft)
- Coordinates: 14°01′36″S 72°50′14″W

Geography
- Location: Peru, Apurímac Region
- Parent range: Andes

Q'urawiri (Quechua huch'uy small, Aymara q'urawiri slinger, someone who catapults something, Q'urawiri the name of a mountain, "little Q'urawiri", Hispanicized spelling Uchuycorahuiri) is a mountain in the Andes of Peru, about 4,800 metres (15,748 ft) high. It is located in the Apurímac Region, Abancay Province, Circa District. It lies northwest of Q'urawiri.
