= Wask'aqucha (Apurímac) =

Lake in Peru

- Location within Peru
- Location: Peru; Apurímac Region, Abancay Province, Circa District
- Coordinates: 14°04′46″S 72°55′27″W

Wask'aqucha (Quechua wask'a rectangle / long, qucha lake, "rectangle lake" or "long lake", hispanicized spelling Huascacocha) is a lake in Peru. It is located in the Apurímac Region, Abancay Province, Circa District.

== See also ==
- Qiwllaqucha
