= Regional Government of Apurímac =

Regional government in Peru

- Gobierno Regional de Apurímac

Regional Government overview
- Formed: January 1, 2003; 22 years ago
- Jurisdiction: Department of Apurímac
- Headquarters: Abancay
- Website: Government site

The Regional Government of Apurímac (Spanish: Gobierno Regional de Apurímac; GORE Apurímac) is the regional government that represents the Department of Apurímac. It is the body with legal identity in public law and its own assets, which is in charge of the administration of provinces of the department in Peru. Its purpose is the social, cultural and economic development of its constituency. It is based in the city of Abancay.

== List of representatives ==
Governor	Political party	Period
Luis Barra Pacheco	Union for Peru	January 1, 2003–September 24, 2004
Rosa Suárez Aliaga	Union for Peru	September 24, 2004–December 31, 2006
David Salazar Morote	Frente Popular Llapanchik	January 1, 2007–December 31, 2010
Elías Segovia Ruiz	Movimiento Poder Popular Andino	January 1, 2011–December 31, 2014
Wilber Venegas Torres	Movimiento Independiente Fuerza Campesina Regional	January 1, 2015–December 31, 2018
Baltazar Lantarón	Movimiento Regional Llankasun Kuska	January 1, 2019–December 31, 2022
Percy Godoy Medina	Front of Hope 2021	January 1, 2023–Incumbent

== See also ==
- Regional Governments of Peru
- Department of Apurímac
