= Pachachaca River =

River in Peru

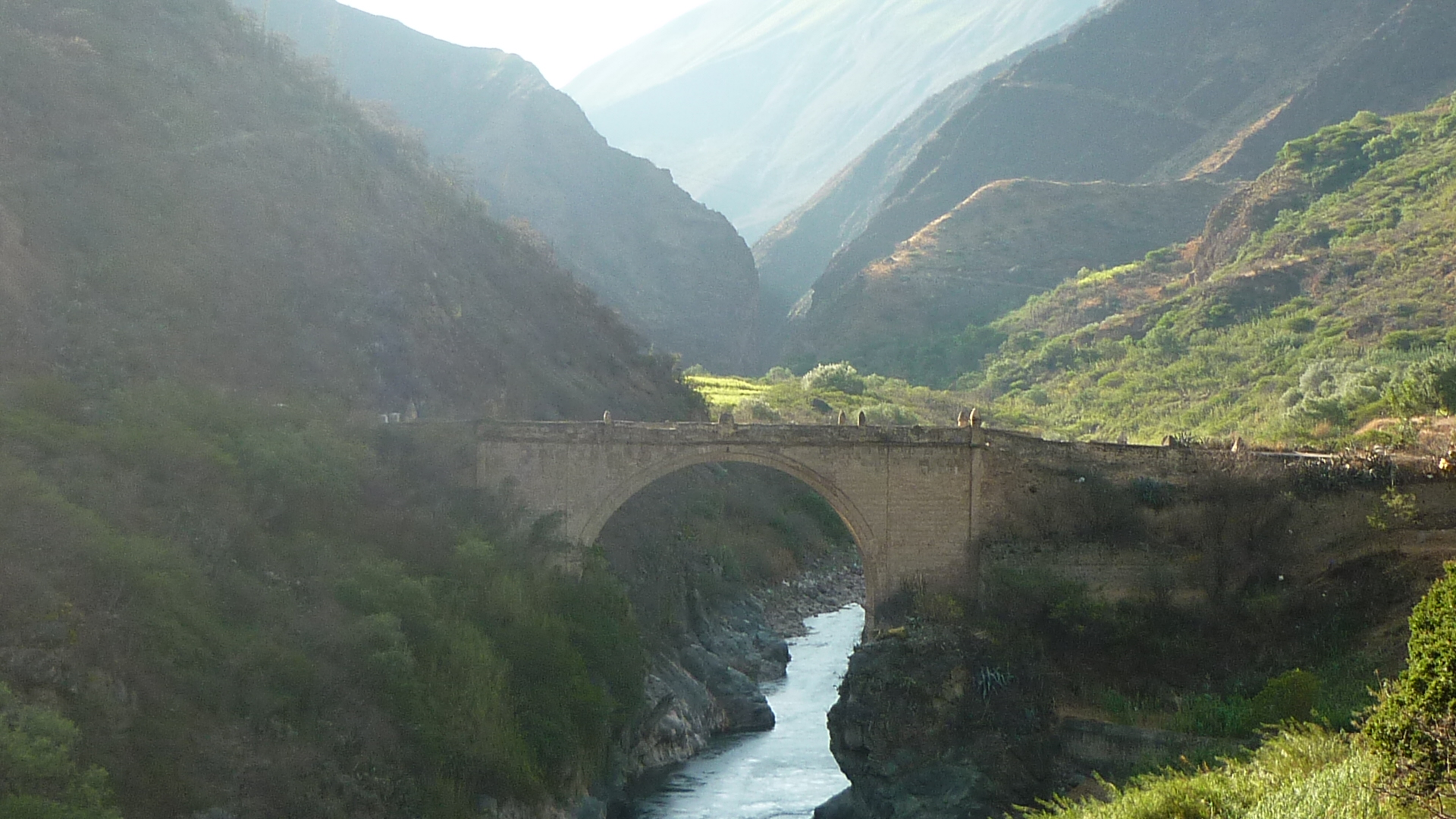
Pachachaca River

The Pachachaca is a river, and also the name of a valley, of the Andes in Peru. Abancay lies on the river and in flows through the Ampay National Sanctuary.
