= Ampay National Sanctuary =

Protected area in Peru

- Santuario Nacional de Ampay
- IUCN category III (natural monument or feature)
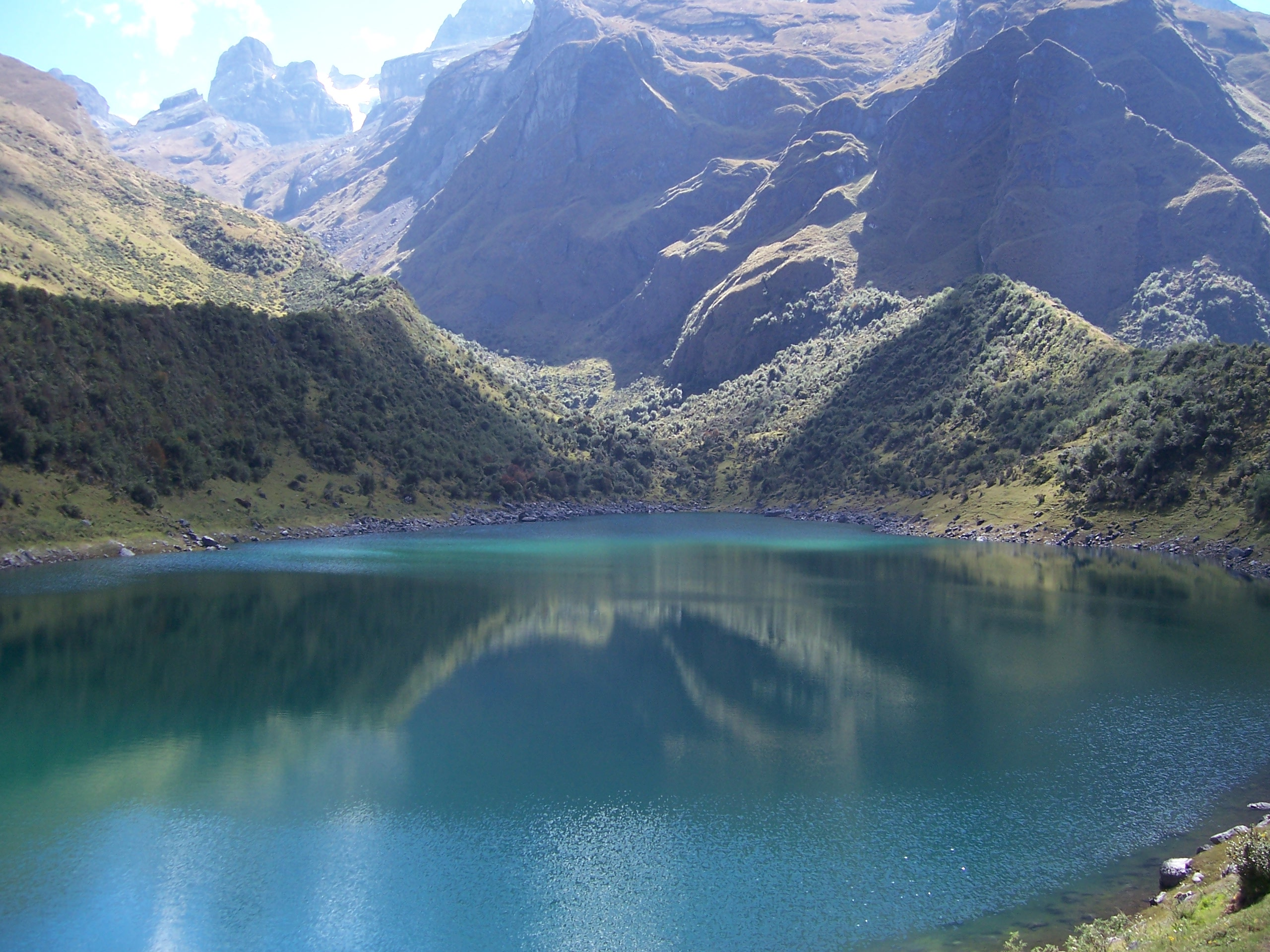
- Mount Ampay (in the background on the left) as seen from Lake Uspaccocha

- Location within Peru
- Location: Peru; Apurimac
- Nearest city: Abancay
- Coordinates: 13°34′44″S 72°53′24″W
- Area: 36.35 km^{2} (14.03 mi^{2})
- Established: 1987
- Governing body: SERNANP
- Website: Santuario Nacional de Ampay (in Spanish)

Ampay National Sanctuary (Santuario Nacional de Ampay) is a wildlife sanctuary established in 1987. It is located in the district of Tamburco, just north of the city of Abancay, Peru. Its 36.35 square kilometres (14.03 mi^{2}), which include Mount Ampay, protect the Pachachaca River basin and several endangered plant species, being the most representative the conifer called Intimpa (Podocarpus glomeratus).

== History ==
In the 1930s, the Podocarpus forest at the Mt. Ampay area was botanically identified.

In 1983, Dr. Ciro Palomino and the "Asociación Cultural Apurímac" (Apurimac Cultural Society) presented a petition signed by more than 3000 people from the towns of Abancay and Tamburco urging then President Fernando Belaunde to help in the approval of the laws required to declare the forests of Ampay as a protected natural area.

Ampay National Sanctuary was established on 23 July 1987, by decree No. 042-87-AG.

== Geography ==
This protected area is located in the district of Tamburco, which belongs to the province of Abancay, region of Apurimac. With an extension of 3,635.50 hectares (14.0367 mi^{2}) the park covers an elevational range from 2,900 to 5,235 meters above sea level in the southeastern Peruvian Andes.

Topography in the area consists mostly of steep slopes that culminate in Mount Ampay.

The area also includes two small lakes: Angasccocha (at 3250 m) and Uspaccocha (at 3750 m).

== Climate ==
The climate is seasonal, with a rainy season from October to April and a dry season from May to September. Between 2300 and 3600 m the mean temperature varies between 11 ° and 16 °C; between 3800 and 4800 m the mean temperature varies from 0 ° to 10 °C; and above 5000 m, temperatures below 0 °C and snow are present. Frosts are frequent between June and September.

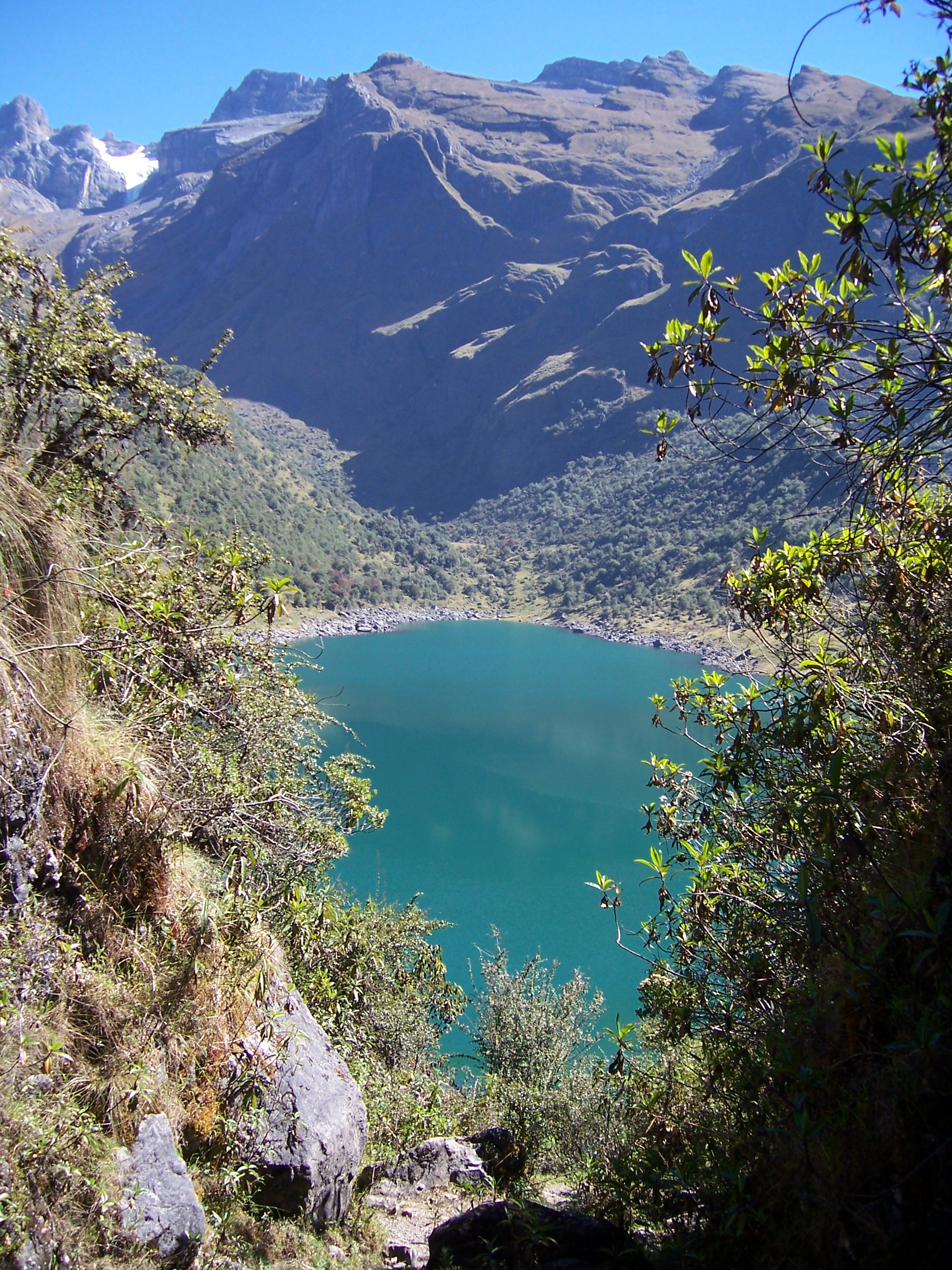
Another view of Lake Uspaccocha inside Ampay National Sanctuary

== Ecology ==
=== Flora ===
There are two main vegetation zones in the sanctuary: the montane forest, with trees like: intimpa (Podocarpus glomeratus), unka (Myrcianthes oreophila), ch'uyllur (Vallea stipularis), chachacomo (Escallonia resinosa), tasta (Escallonia myrtilloides), huamanq'ero (Styloceras laurifolium), wankartipa (Randia boliviana) and capuli-pishay (Prunus rigida), along with associated shrubs and herbs; and the high altitude grasslands, with herb species of the genera: Jarava, Festuca, Calamagrostis, Werneria, Valeriana, Azorella, among others. There is a transitional zone above 3700 m between these two main vegetation zones and is dominated by: tasta (Escallonia myrtilloides), masuka (Brachyotum sp.). and chawchapay (Saracha punctata).

Forests of the conifer intimpa (Podocarpus glomeratus) cover an extension of almost 600 hectares; with this tree showing an abundance of 430 individuals per hectare.

A total of 115 species of woody plants, distributed in 72 genera and 44 families have been found in this protected area.

=== Fauna ===
Among the mammals present in this wildlife sanctuary are the montane guinea pig, the vizcacha (both species inhabit the high Andean grasslands above 3700 m of elevation), the puma, the Andean fox, the white-tailed deer and the taruca.

Birds present in the area include the Andean hillstar, the Andean gull, the undulated antpitta, Taczanowski's tinamou, the Andean goose, the Andean condor and the endemic Apurímac spinetail.

== Activities ==
Hiking and camping are the main activities in the area, as there are suitable camping sites designated by the park authority.

== Environmental issues ==
Despite being a protected natural area, illegal hunting, invasive plant species, agricultural fields, wood cutting, field burning and cattle grazing are reported in the sanctuary.
