= Universidad Nacional Micaela Bastidas de Apurímac =

Coordinates: 13.6170°S 72.8680°W

Universidad Nacional Micaela Bastidas de Apurímac is a university in Abancay, Peru.
