= Vallea ecuadorensis =

Conservation status
- Near Threatened (IUCN 3.1)

Scientific classification
- Kingdom: Plantae
- Clade: Tracheophytes
- Clade: Angiosperms
- Clade: Eudicots
- Clade: Rosids
- Order: Oxalidales
- Family: Elaeocarpaceae
- Genus: Vallea
- Species: V. ecuadorensis

Binomial name
- Vallea ecuadorensis J.Jaram.

Species of tree

Vallea ecuadorensis is a species of tree in the Elaeocarpaceae family. Although formerly considered endemic to Ecuador it has also been collected in Bolivia and Peru. This species occurs in subtropical or tropical moist montane forests, at 2500 – 3500 meters above sea level.
