= Asarpay =

Asarpay, also known as Sarpay (16th century), was an Inca priestess in a cult dedicated to Apurima, the personified version of the Apurimac River, during the 1500s.

She was the sister of the Inca, possibly a daughter of the Inca Huayna Capac.

Asarpay spoke for the Apurimac shrine, understood as an oracle of the personified river. She would give advice and warning to those of her community on the shrine's behalf.

Asarpay is known for her actions and premonitions during the Spanish conquest; Asarpay foretold the Conquest and advised Inca nobility to gather and use up all of their food stores, as to not leave the conquerors any access to their resources.

Asarpay is mentioned most frequently in regards to her sensationalized suicide; the reasoning for her suicide, however, is not exact. There are some claims that Asarpay threw herself into the Apurimac river gorge as a way to assure her freedom after being previously kidnapped by the Spaniard Diego Nunez Mercado. However, it is also believed that Asarpay threw herself from the Apurima temple into the river as a way of returning to the river goddess, rather than watching the destruction of the idol by the advancing Spanish army.
