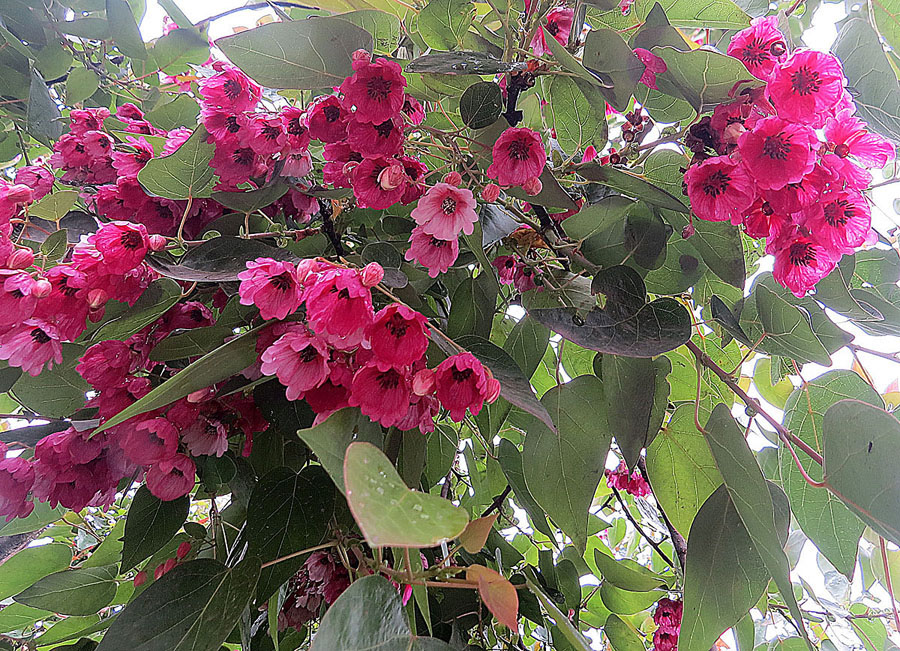
- Vallea stipularis

Scientific classification
- Kingdom: Plantae
- Clade: Tracheophytes
- Clade: Angiosperms
- Clade: Eudicots
- Clade: Rosids
- Order: Oxalidales
- Family: Elaeocarpaceae
- Genus: Vallea; Mutis ex L.f.

Species
- See text

= Vallea =

Genus of trees

Vallea is a genus of trees in the family Elaeocarpaceae. It is native to the Andes mountain range in South America and contains two species:

- Vallea ecuadorensis
- Vallea stipularis
