= Ampay =

Mountain in Peru

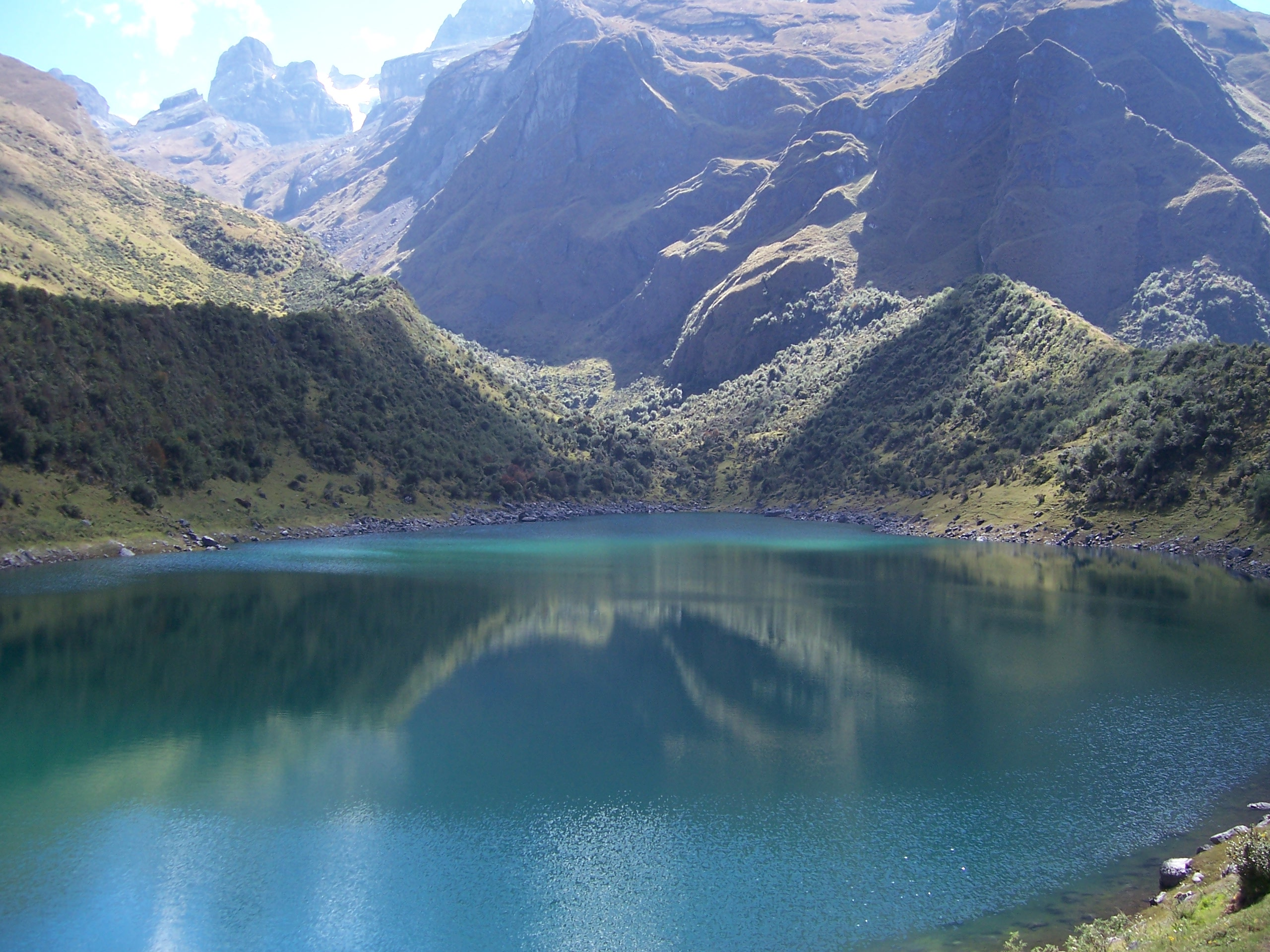
- Ampay (in the background on the left) as seen from Usphaqucha

Highest point
- Elevation: 5,236 m (17,178 ft)
- Coordinates: 13°33′34″S 72°55′59″W

Geography
- Location within Peru
- Location: Peru, Apurímac Region
- Parent range: Andes

Ampay is a 5,235-metre-high (17,175 ft) mountain in the Andes of Peru. It is located in the Apurímac Region, Abancay Province, on the border of the districts of Abancay, Huanipaca and Tamburco. The mountain lies in the Ampay National Sanctuary.

An intermittent stream named Q'illu Yakuyuq (Quechua for "the one with yellow water", also spelled Ceelloyacuyoc) originates west of the mountain. It flows to the northwest.

== See also ==
- Usphaqucha
