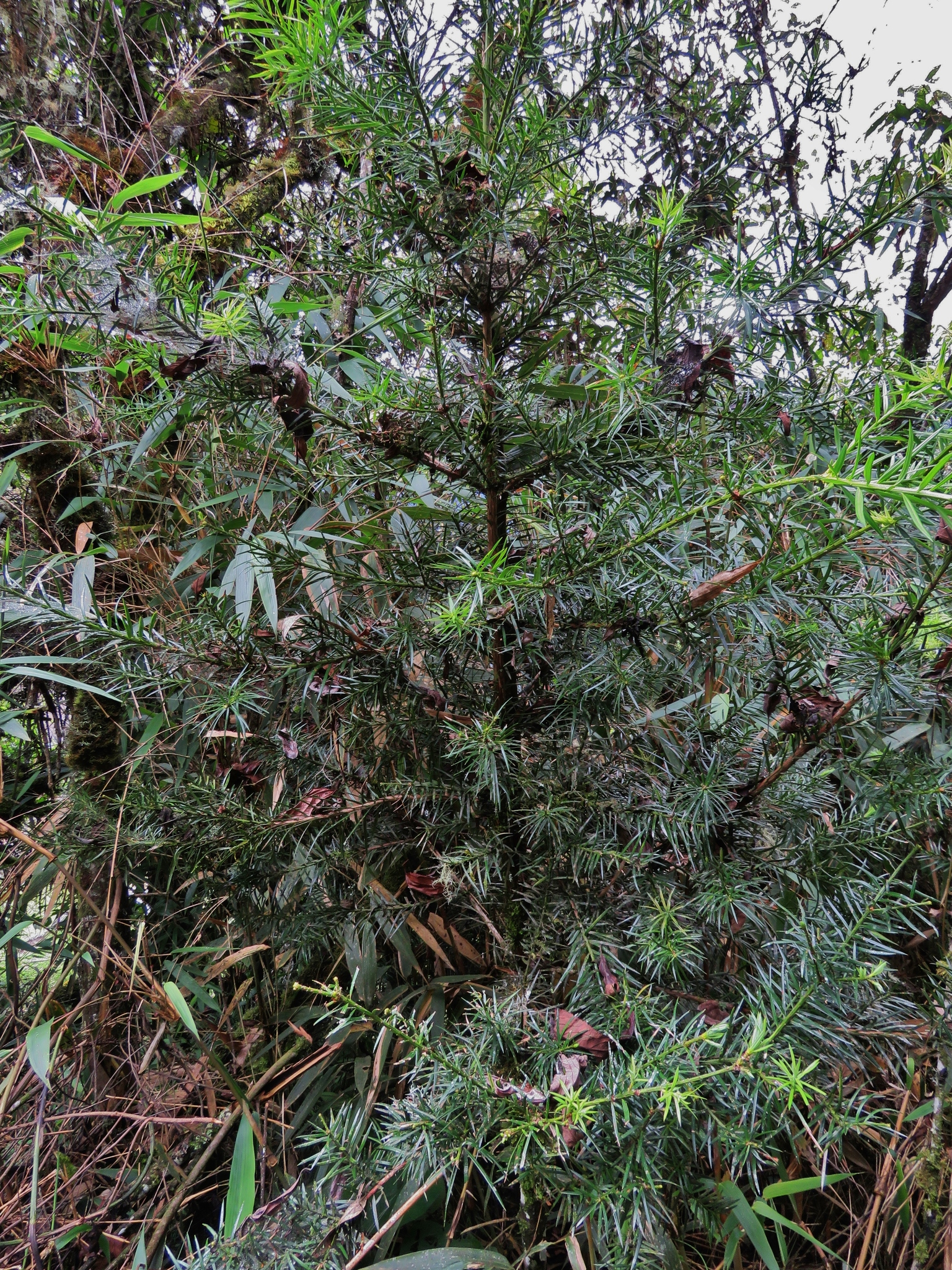
- Near Cusco, Peru

Conservation status
- Near Threatened (IUCN 3.1)

Scientific classification
- Kingdom: Plantae
- Clade: Tracheophytes
- Clade: Gymnosperms
- Division: Pinophyta
- Class: Pinopsida
- Order: Araucariales
- Family: Podocarpaceae
- Genus: Podocarpus
- Species: P. glomeratus

Binomial name
- Podocarpus glomeratus D.Don

Synonyms
- Nageia glomerata (D.Don) Kuntze; Podocarpus cardenasii J.Buchholz & N.E.Gray; Podocarpus rigidus Klotzsch ex Endl.

= Podocarpus glomeratus =

Species of conifer

Podocarpus glomeratus is a species of coniferous tree in the family Podocarpaceae. It is native to the montane rainforests of Bolivia, Ecuador, and Peru; between 1800–3600 meters above sea level.

== Description ==
They are shrubs or trees up to 20 m. high, with dark brown bark. Leaves are 2–5 cm. long, 2–4 mm. wide; rigid and almost erect, linear-lanceolate or sometimes almost falcate; light grayish green and shiny above, whitish beneath; the base narrowed into a very short petiole; the tip ending in a stiff pungent prickle. Pollen cones up to 6 mm. long, clustered in groups of 6 on slender peduncles 8–12 mm. long. Ovulate cones sessile or on peduncles up to 4 mm. long, with a receptacle 5–6 mm. long. Seed 5 mm. long, subglobose.

== Distribution and habitat ==
Podocarpus glomeratus is native to Bolivia, Ecuador and Peru, where it grows in Andean montane cloud forests from 1,800 to 3,600 metres elevation. It is an indicator species of primary forest.

== See also ==
- Podocarpus National Park
