= Prunus rigida =

Scientific classification
- Kingdom: Plantae
- Clade: Tracheophytes
- Clade: Angiosperms
- Clade: Eudicots
- Clade: Rosids
- Order: Rosales
- Family: Rosaceae
- Genus: Prunus
- Species: P. rigida

Binomial name
- Prunus rigida Koehne

Species of tree

Prunus rigida, is a species of shrub or tree in the family Rosaceae. It is native to Peru and Bolivia.

P. rigida grows up to 6 metres (20 feet) tall. The leaves are rigid, ovate-lanceolate in shape, up to 15 centimetres (6 inches) long, with toothed margin. The flowers are arranged in racemes up to 6 cm (2 1/2 in) long.
