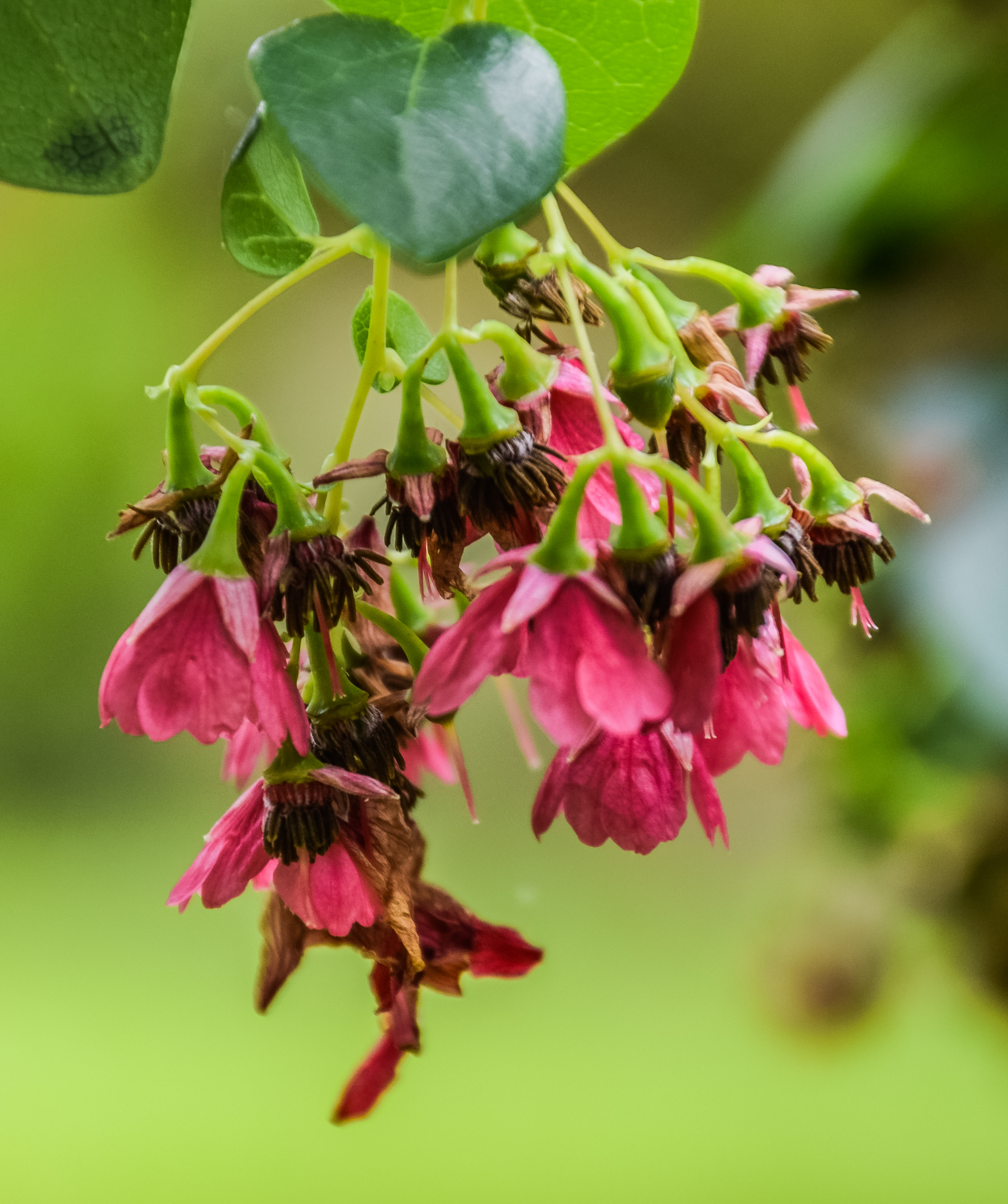
- Flowers.

Scientific classification
- Kingdom: Plantae
- Clade: Tracheophytes
- Clade: Angiosperms
- Clade: Eudicots
- Clade: Rosids
- Order: Oxalidales
- Family: Elaeocarpaceae
- Genus: Vallea
- Species: V. stipularis

Binomial name
- Vallea stipularis L.f.

= Vallea stipularis =

Species of tree

Vallea stipularis is a species of tree in the Elaeocarpaceae family. It is native from the Andes mountains in South America.

== Description ==
Evergreen shrub or tree up to 18 meters tall; fissured bark. Kidney-shaped stipules on branchlets. Leaves heart-shaped or pear-shaped, sometimes lobed, up to 10 cm long, dark green above, whitish green beneath, with tufts of hairs in the vein axils. Cymose inflorescence with pinkish-red or crimson bell-shaped flowers; these with five sepals and five three-lobed petals, 9–13 mm long; ovary and styles glabrous; 15–60 stamens. Warty fruits, 1 cm wide, often dehiscing on the tree.

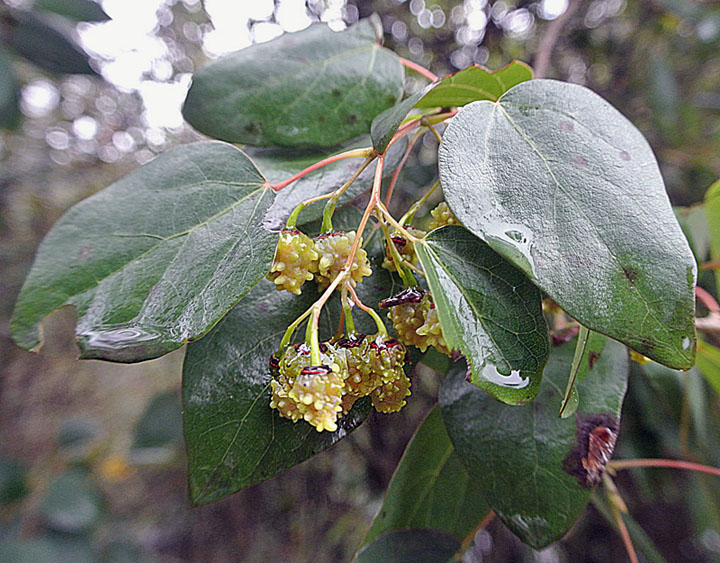
Leaves and fruits.

== Distribution and habitat ==
Vallea stipularis is native to the Andes, in montane forest and páramo, between 1600–4000 m of elevation, from Venezuela to Bolivia.
