= Abancay province =

Coordinates: 13.634°S 72.881°W

Abancay
- Province
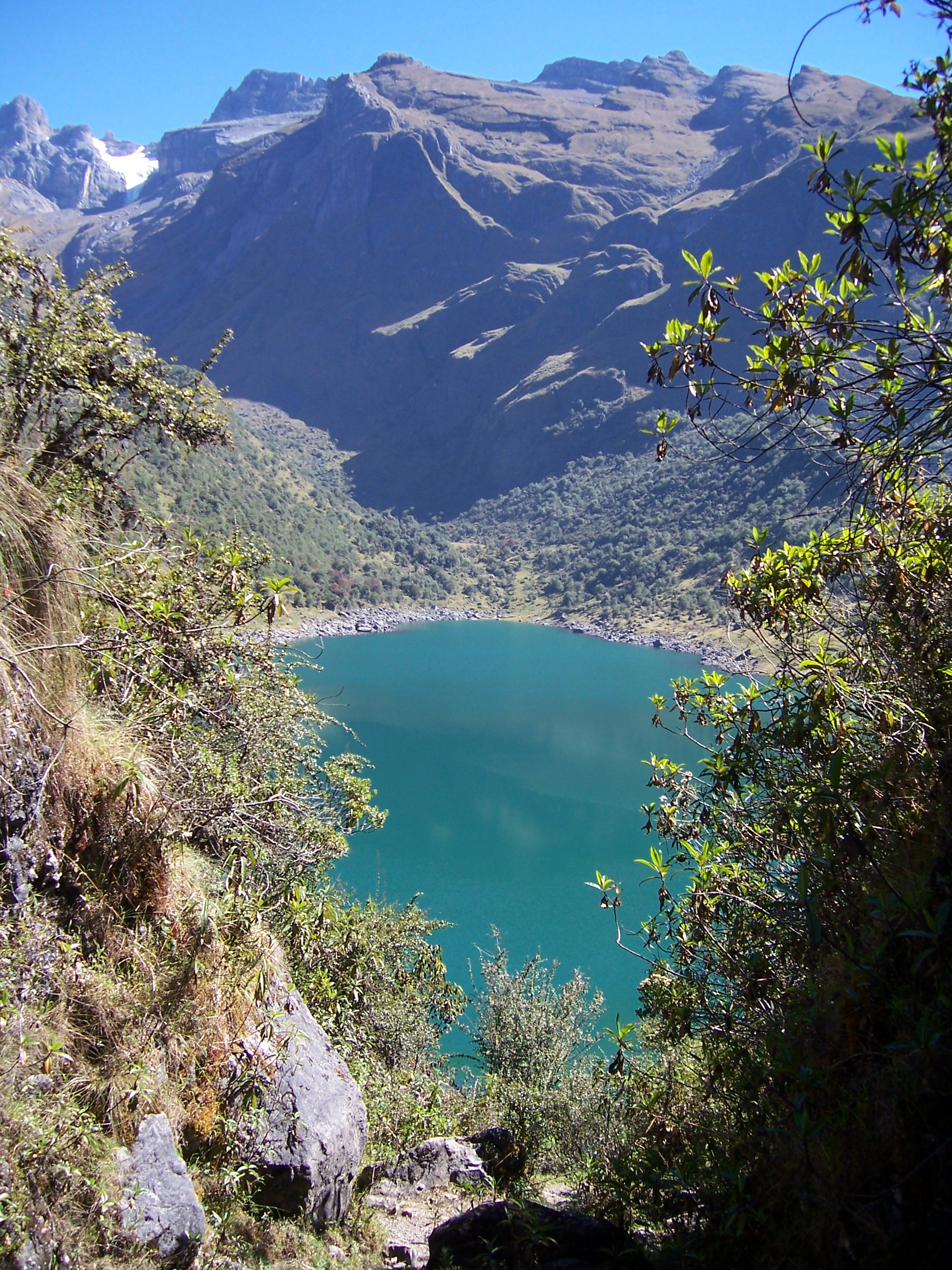
- Ampay (in the background on the left) as seen from Usphaqucha

- Coat of arms

- Location of Abancay in the Apurímac Region
- Country: Peru
- Region: Apurímac
- Capital: Abancay

Government
  - Mayor: Néstor Raúl Peña Sánchez

Area
  - Total: 3,447.13 km^{2} (1,330.94 sq mi)

Population
  - Total: 110,520
  - Density: 32.061/km^{2} (83.039/sq mi)
- UBIGEO: 0301
- Website: www.muniabancay.gob.pe

Abancay is one of seven provinces of the Apurímac Region in Peru. The capital of the province is the city of Abancay.

== Boundaries ==
- North: Cusco Region
- East: provinces of Cotabambas and Grau
- South: provinces of Aymaraes, Antabamba and Grau
- West: provinces of Andahuaylas and Aymaraes

== Geography ==
One of the highest mountains of the province is Ampay located in the Ampay National Sanctuary. Other mountains are listed below:

- Allqa Marka
- Antaqucha
- Aqu Q'asa
- Atuq Pata
- Chakana
- Chaku Urqu
- Chawpi
- Chunkara
- Chuntani
- Hatun Ullukuyuq
- Huch'uy Q'urawiri
- Ichhu Urqu
- Inka Pirqa
- Inka Wasi
- Janq'u Marka
- Kallanka
- Kimsa P'ukru
- Kimsa P'unqu
- Kimsa Urqu
- Kimsaqucha
- Kimsa Wayna
- Kiska Urqu
- Kuntur Sinqa
- Kunturillu
- Lurituyuq
- Llaksa
- Llikawi
- Mawk'allaqta
- Muruqucha
- Pillpintu
- Pinqulluni
- Pirwata
- Pisqaqucha
- Pukara
- P'unqu Q'asa
- Qala Saywa
- Qillqas
- Qiñwa Marka
- Qiñwa Urqu
- Quncha Pallana
- Q'illu Q'asa
- Q'illu Q'asa (Aban.-Grau)
- Q'urawiri
- Rumi Chaka
- Runtuqucha
- Silla Urqu
- Suntur
- Sunturu
- Sunturuyuq
- Sunqun Marka
- Surimana
- Waman Ch'arpa
- Waraquyuq
- Warmi Rumi
- Wayllayuq
- Willkawara
- Wiraqucha
- Wisk'achayuq
- Yana Allpa
- Yana Qaqa
- Yana Urqu

== Political division ==
The province of Abancay is divided into nine districts, which are:

District	Mayor
Abancay	Guido Chahuaylla Maldonado
Chacoche	Martin Puma Cayllahua
Circa	Asunto Gregorio Montoya Juro
Curahuasi	Danilo Valenza Calvo
Huanipaca	Jose Chacon Vargas
Lambrama	Hilario Saldivar Taipe
Pichirhua	Marcelino Montes Aguilar
San Pedro de Cachora	Huber Cuaresma Espinoza
Tamburco	Fernando Zuñiga Gutierrez

== Ethnic groups ==
The province is inhabited by indigenous citizens of Quechua descent. Spanish is the language which the majority of the population (51.47%) learnt to speak in childhood, 48.06% of the residents started speaking using the Quechua language and 0.21% using Aymara (2007 Peru Census).

== See also ==
- Inka Raqay
- Qiwllaqucha
- Qurimarka
- Q'illu Q'asa
- Usnu Muqu
- Usphaqucha
- Wask'aqucha
