= Lake Uspaccocha =

Lake in Peru

- Lake Uspaycocha
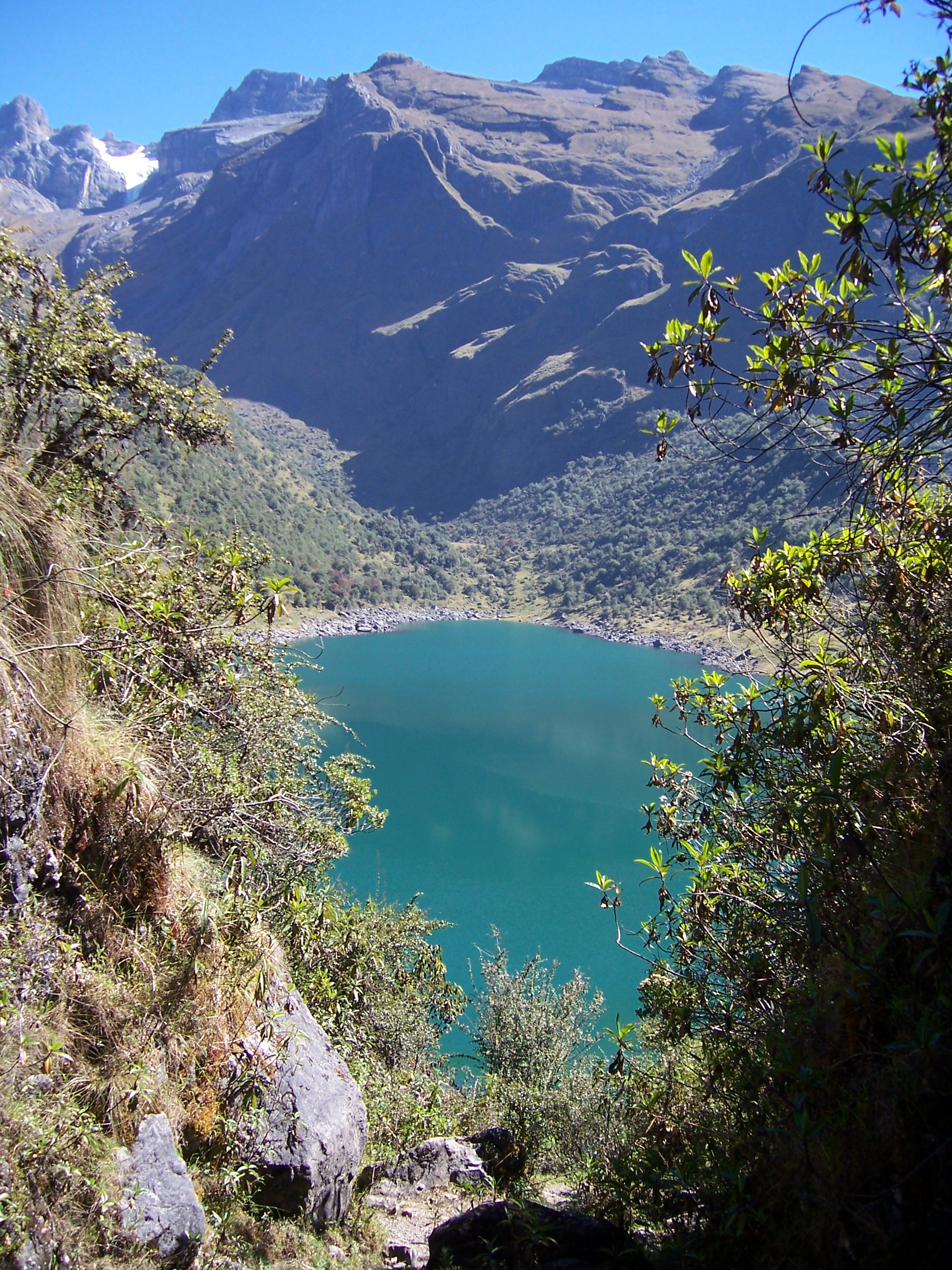
- Lake Uspaccocha

- Location within Peru
- Location: Apurímac Region
- Coordinates: 13°34′28″S 72°53′18″W
- Basin countries: Peru
- Max. length: 0.45 kilometres (0.28 mi)
- Max. width: 0.15 kilometres (0.093 mi)
- Surface area: 0.052 square kilometres (0.020 sq mi)
- Max. depth: 10 metres (33 ft)
- Surface elevation: 3,750 metres (12,300 ft)

Lake Uspaccocha or Uspaycocha (possibly from Quechua uspha, uchpha ash, rest of combustion, qucha lake, lagoon, "ash lake") is a lake in the Andes of Peru located in the Apurímac Region, Abancay Province, Abancay District. It is situated in the Ampay National Sanctuary, at 3750 meters above sea level, north of the city of Abancay.

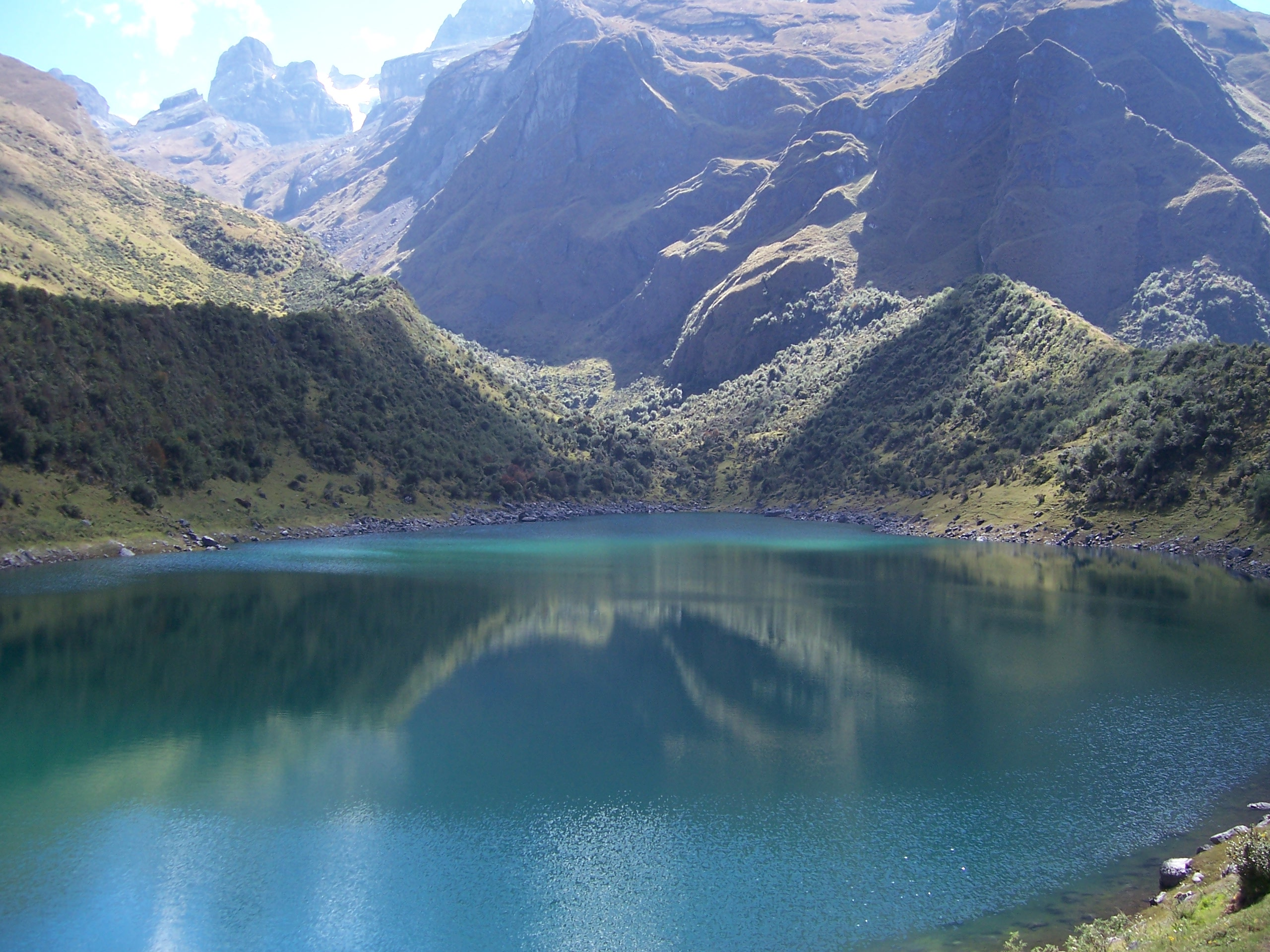
Lake Uspaccocha
