= Abancay =

Town in Apurímac, Peru

Abancay Santiago de los Reyes de Abancay
- Town
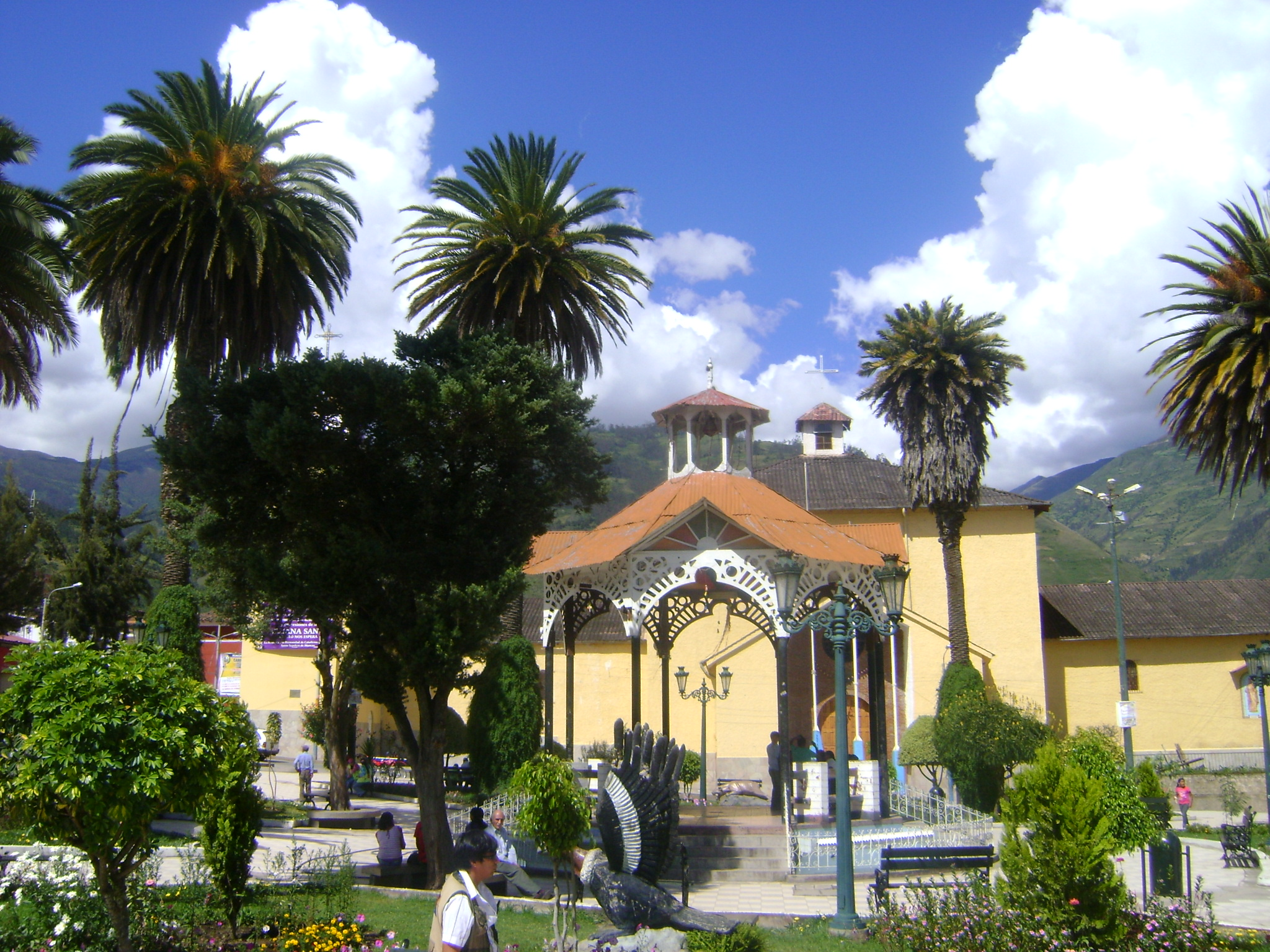
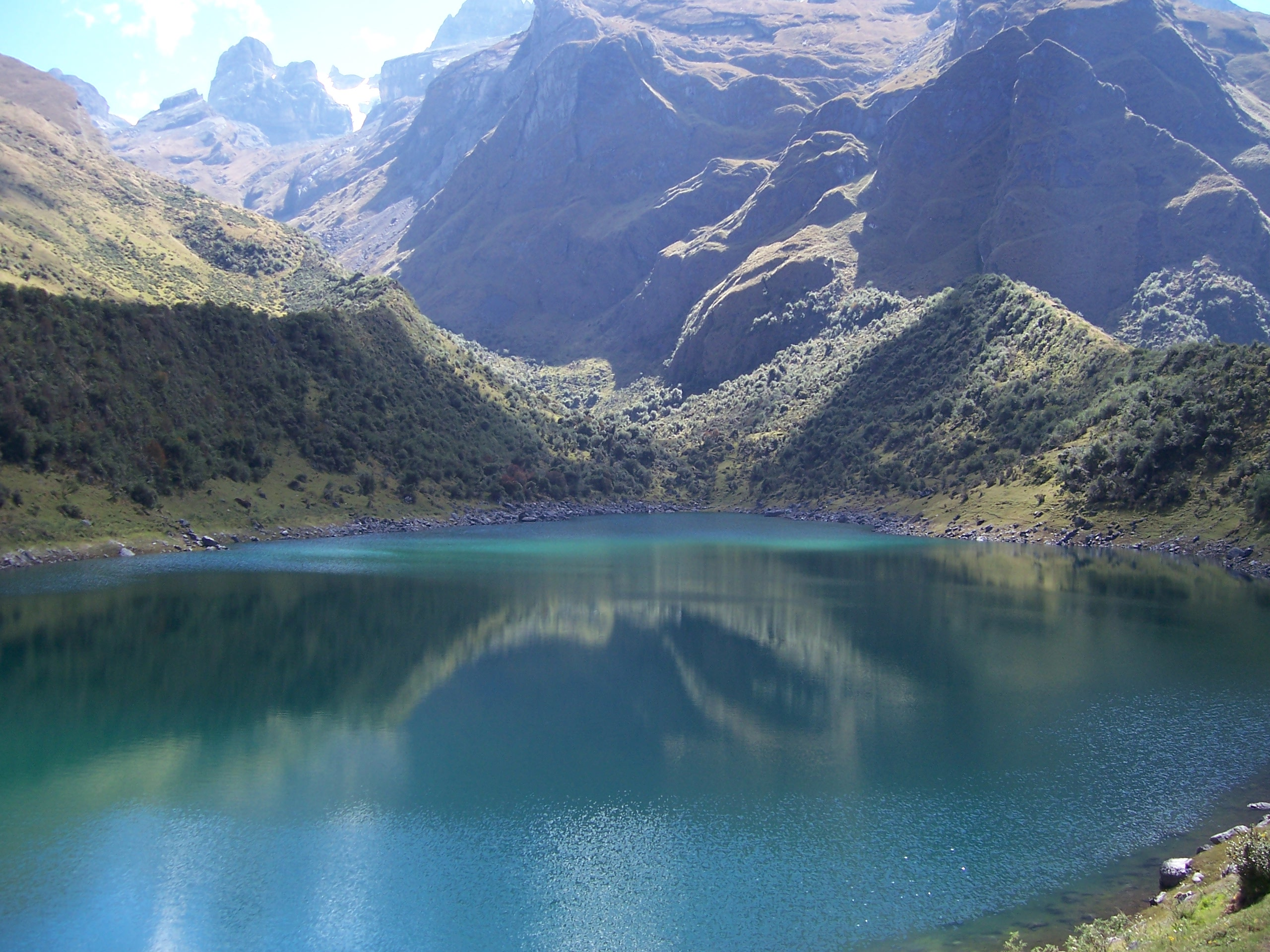
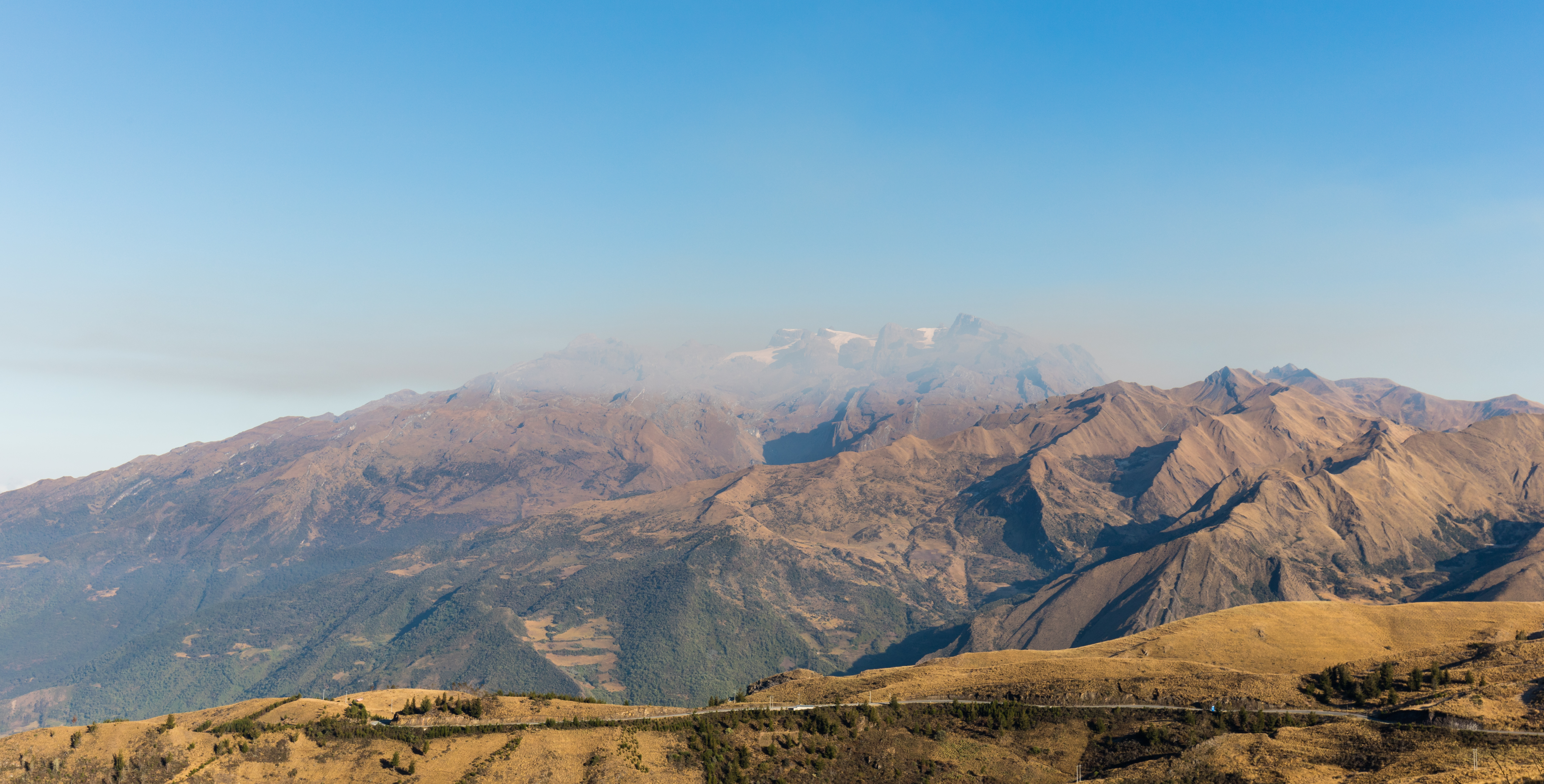
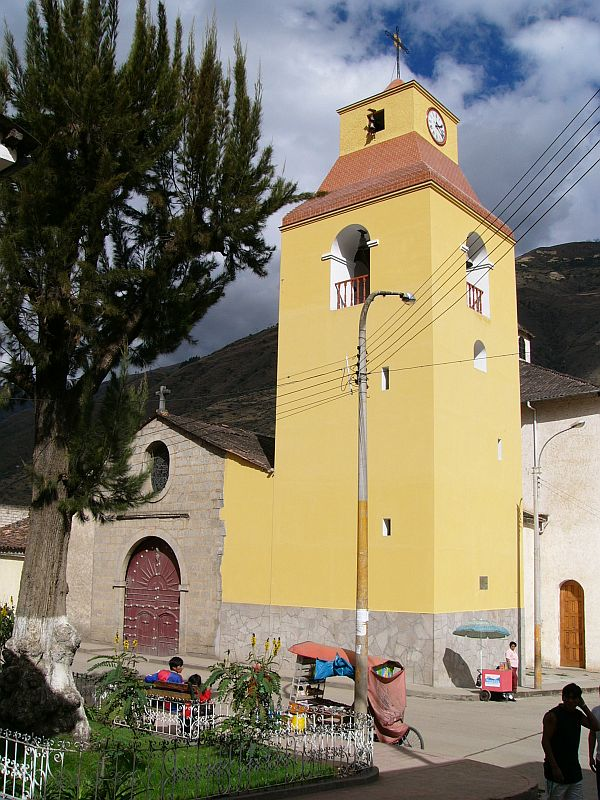
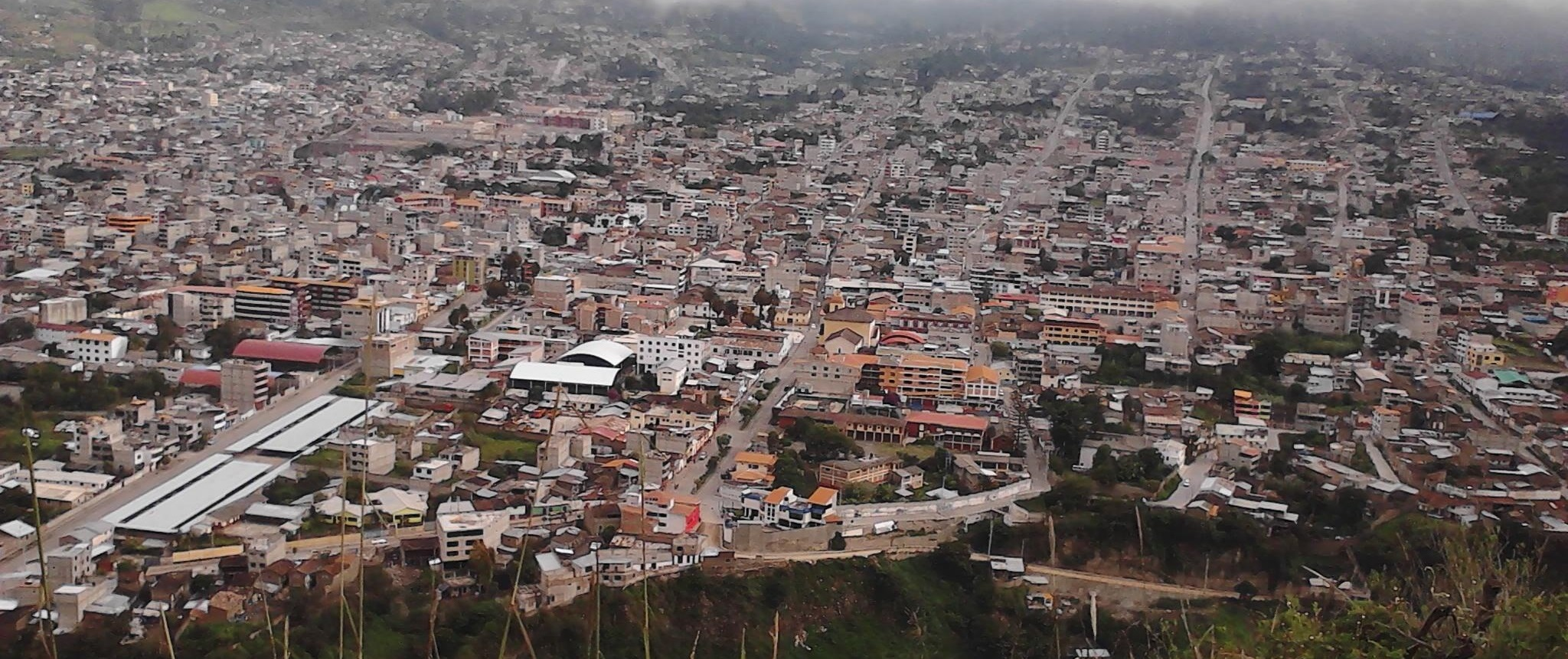
- Main Square Lake Uspaccocha View of the Andes Abancay Cathedral Aerial view

- Seal
- Motto: El Eterno Valle Primaveral (The Eternal Springtime Valley)
- Location within Peru
- Coordinates: 13°38′S 72°53′W
- Country: Peru
- Region: Apurímac
- Province: Abancay
- Established: 1540
- Town: 1873
- City: 1874

Government
  - Mayor: Néstor Raúl Peña Sánchez
- Elevation: 2,377 m (7,799 ft)

Population (2017 census)
  - Total: 72,277
  - Estimate (2015): 58,741
- Time zone: UTC-5 (PET)
- Postal code: 03001
- Website: www.muniabancay.gob.pe

Abancay (from Quechua language: Hamanqay, Amanqay, or Amankay, meaning lily), founded in 1572 as Santiago de los Reyes de Abancay, is a city in southern-central Peru. It is the capital of both the Apurímac Region and the Abancay Province, and serves an important cultural, economic, and political role in Apurímac.

== Name ==
The origin of the word Abancay might have two possible explanations:

1. It is a transliteration to Spanish of the Quechuan word amancay, meaning lily.
2. It originates from the Quechuan awanqay, meaning weaving place, which is the version proposed by Rodolfo Cerrón Palomino, a Peruvian linguist.

== Geography ==
Abancay is located at an elevation of 2,377 metres (7,799 ft) above sea level in the southern Peruvian Andes, above the Pachachaca River, and straddles the Marino River. Because of its dry mountain and famous year-round warm weather it is known as "The Eternal Springtime Valley". The nearest cities are Cusco, Chalhuanca and Andahuaylas. Abancay is located at the junction of two important Peruvian roads: the Caminos del Inca Road, an old road dating from Incan times, between the cities of Nazca and Cusco, and the Via de los Libertadores, connecting Ayacucho and Cusco.

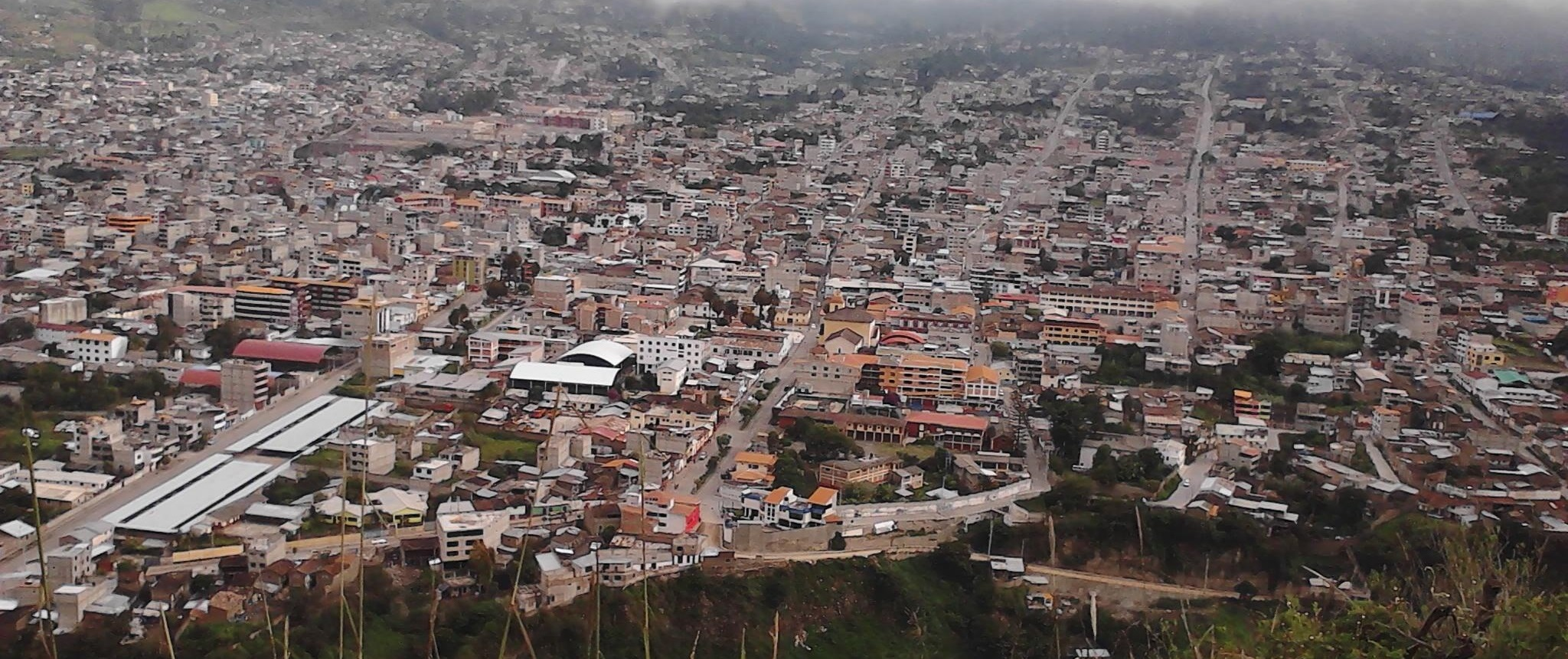
Panoramic view of Abancay

=== Climate ===
Climate data for Abancay, elevation 2,377 m (7,799 ft)
Month	Jan	Feb	Mar	Apr	May	Jun	Jul	Aug	Sep	Oct	Nov	Dec	Year
Mean daily maximum °C (°F)	23.7 (74.7)	23.3 (73.9)	23.0 (73.4)	23.8 (74.8)	24.0 (75.2)	23.5 (74.3)	23.2 (73.8)	23.9 (75.0)	24.8 (76.6)	25.8 (78.4)	25.6 (78.1)	24.5 (76.1)	24.1 (75.4)
Daily mean °C (°F)	17.5 (63.5)	17.3 (63.1)	17.1 (62.8)	17.3 (63.1)	17.0 (62.6)	16.5 (61.7)	16.0 (60.8)	16.8 (62.2)	17.8 (64.0)	18.6 (65.5)	18.6 (65.5)	17.9 (64.2)	17.4 (63.3)
Mean daily minimum °C (°F)	11.3 (52.3)	11.4 (52.5)	11.1 (52.0)	10.7 (51.3)	10.0 (50.0)	9.5 (49.1)	8.9 (48.0)	9.7 (49.5)	10.8 (51.4)	11.4 (52.5)	11.5 (52.7)	11.4 (52.5)	10.6 (51.2)
Average precipitation mm (inches)	180.4 (7.10)	183.0 (7.20)	141.9 (5.59)	52.0 (2.05)	14.8 (0.58)	10.2 (0.40)	11.9 (0.47)	17.7 (0.70)	24.2 (0.95)	65.3 (2.57)	84.3 (3.32)	117.7 (4.63)	903.4 (35.56)
Source 1: Municipalidad Distrital de Kishuara
Source 2: Plataforma del Estado Peruano (precipitation 1965–2012)

== History ==
Abancay was already a populated area before the arrival of the Incas. It was the frontier of the Quechua-Inca cultural influence area of the Chancas, an ethnic native group of Peru. Its name comes from a flower native to the region called amankay. When the Spanish arrived, they transliterated the word and named the city Abancay, Villa de los Reyes ("Abancay, Village of the Kings"), which was later reduced to Abancay, its current name. Abancay was the location of the Battle of Abancay between the forces of the Conquistadores Francisco Pizarro and Diego de Almagro. Abancay was mentioned in the first Cronicas (Pedro Cieza de León) as an encomienda dedicated to the cultivation of sugar cane for the production of aguardiente.

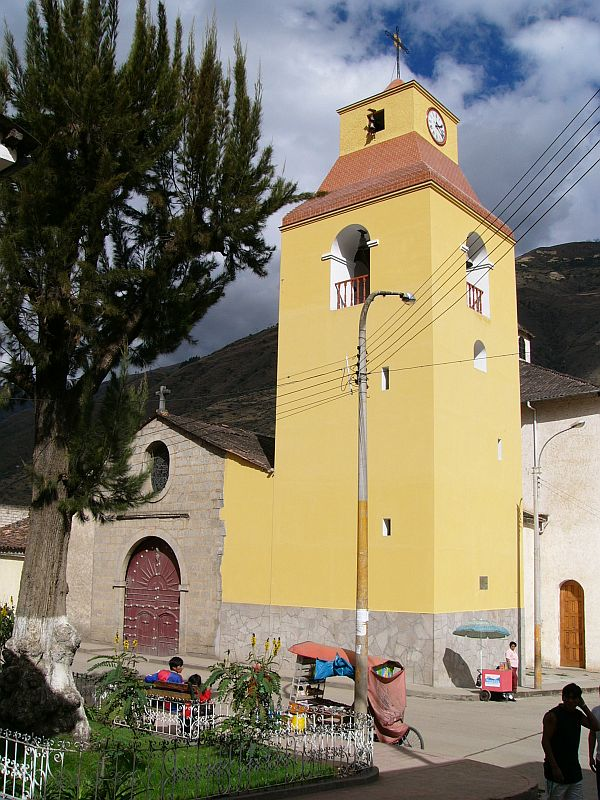
Abancay Cathedral's Bells Tower

There is a traditional tale about the foundation of the city recorded by Guillermo Vidalegut, a local journalist, in his book "Alma y Rostro de Abancay", who, inspired by Ricardo Palma's Tradiciones Peruanas, gathered local traditional stories. As the story goes, during colonial times, the town was located above the valley, in one of the skirts of the Ampay mountain, in a place which is now known as Ccorhuani. One day, the statue of the Virgin Mary known as Our Lady of the Rosary, Patroness of the village, mysteriously disappeared from the local Church. The people, fearing robbery and claiming sacrilege, searched day and night until a shepherd found the statue standing above an immense boulder by the valley. The people believed that the thieves had left the statue in fear of being discovered by the search parties. The statue was returned in a procession back into town. A few weeks later, the same disappearance occurred again and another search ensued. The statue was again found in the same spot where it was found before. Lo and behold, the disappearance happened a third time. The people never understood why or how this was happening. Finally, it was suggested that maybe the statue was asking for a shrine in the valley at the location where it was being found. The town then built a small Chapel there, and it became a place of constant visits by the people. Before long, it became the center of activity, and the entire town was moved to where is located today. The statue of Our Lady of the Rosary still sits above the immense boulder which is located on the right side of the Cathedral.

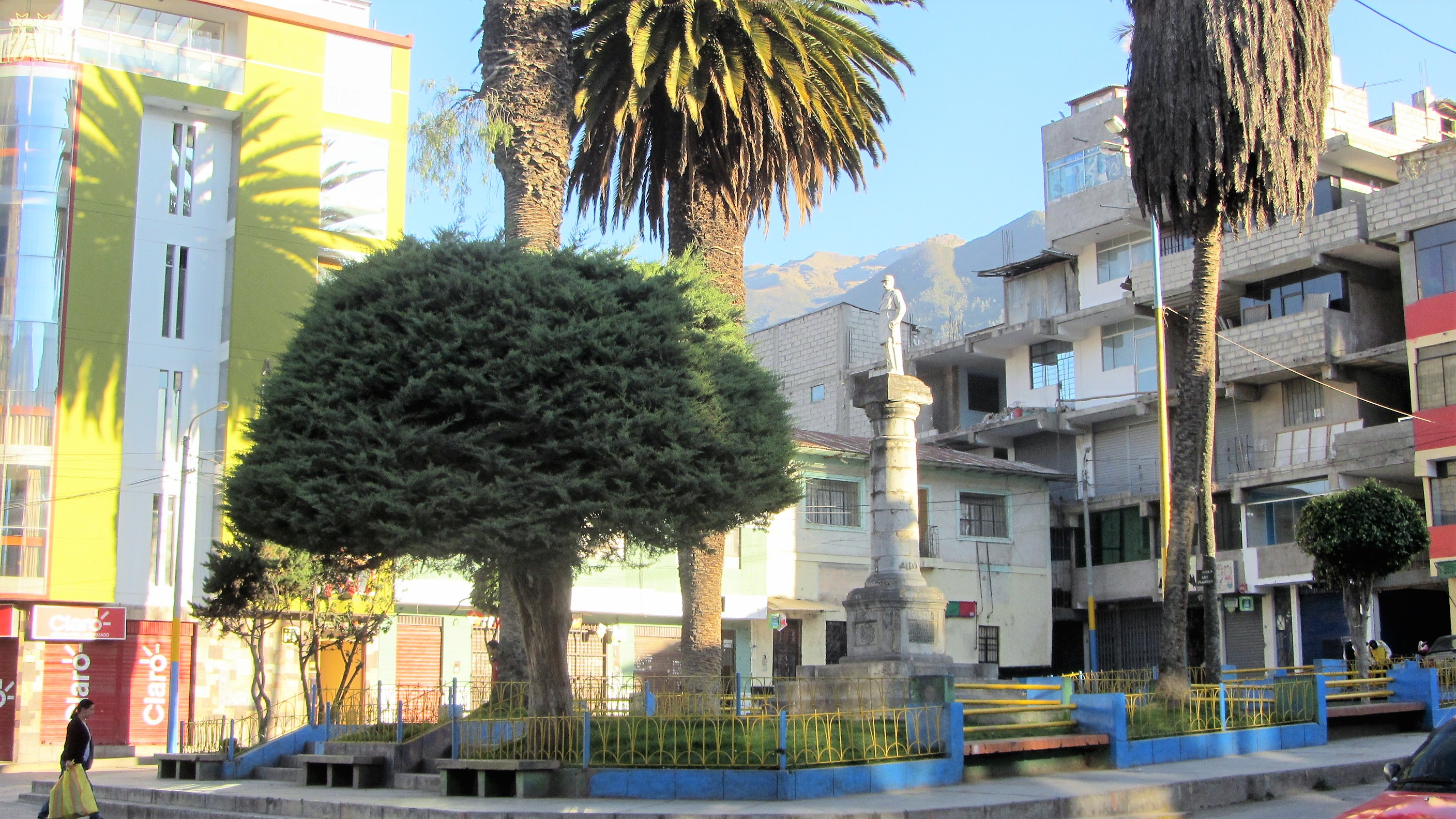
Ocampo Park in Abancay

== Economy ==
Abancay is the agricultural center, as well as the industrial center of most of Apurímac. Sugar is milled, along with rum and other liquor distillation. There are copper mines in the area, and they are also known for their sericulture.

== Population ==
The population as of 2014 is 58 000 which has more than doubled the city in size since 1990 when the population was 29,200.

== Tourism ==
The Carnival is the town's main celebration festival. It is famous as one of the best Peruvian ethnomusical festivals. It takes place from the last week of February through the last week of March. The comparsas contest and Yunsa games, with people dressing in local traditional costumes, fill the streets of the city. Every social group, from market vendors, students, government officials, teachers, etc., participate in the games which also have the support from the local and regional government due its cultural relevance.

The city's surroundings include noted landscapes, such as the Ampay National Sanctuary, a wildlife sanctuary and a frontier within the Andes, and the Clouded Forest of the Amazonian Basin, located north of the city where the mountain called Apu Ampay (the Lord of Ampay, in the indigenous cosmology) is also located. Apu Ampay reaches heights of approximately 5,300 meters above sea level. There are also cave paintings, meteorite crash sites, lagoons, waterfalls, wildlife, orchids, and the famous Intimpa tree (a unique tropical conifer preserved by an effort led by the World Wildlife Fund) constitute a few of the attractions that nature lovers will find.

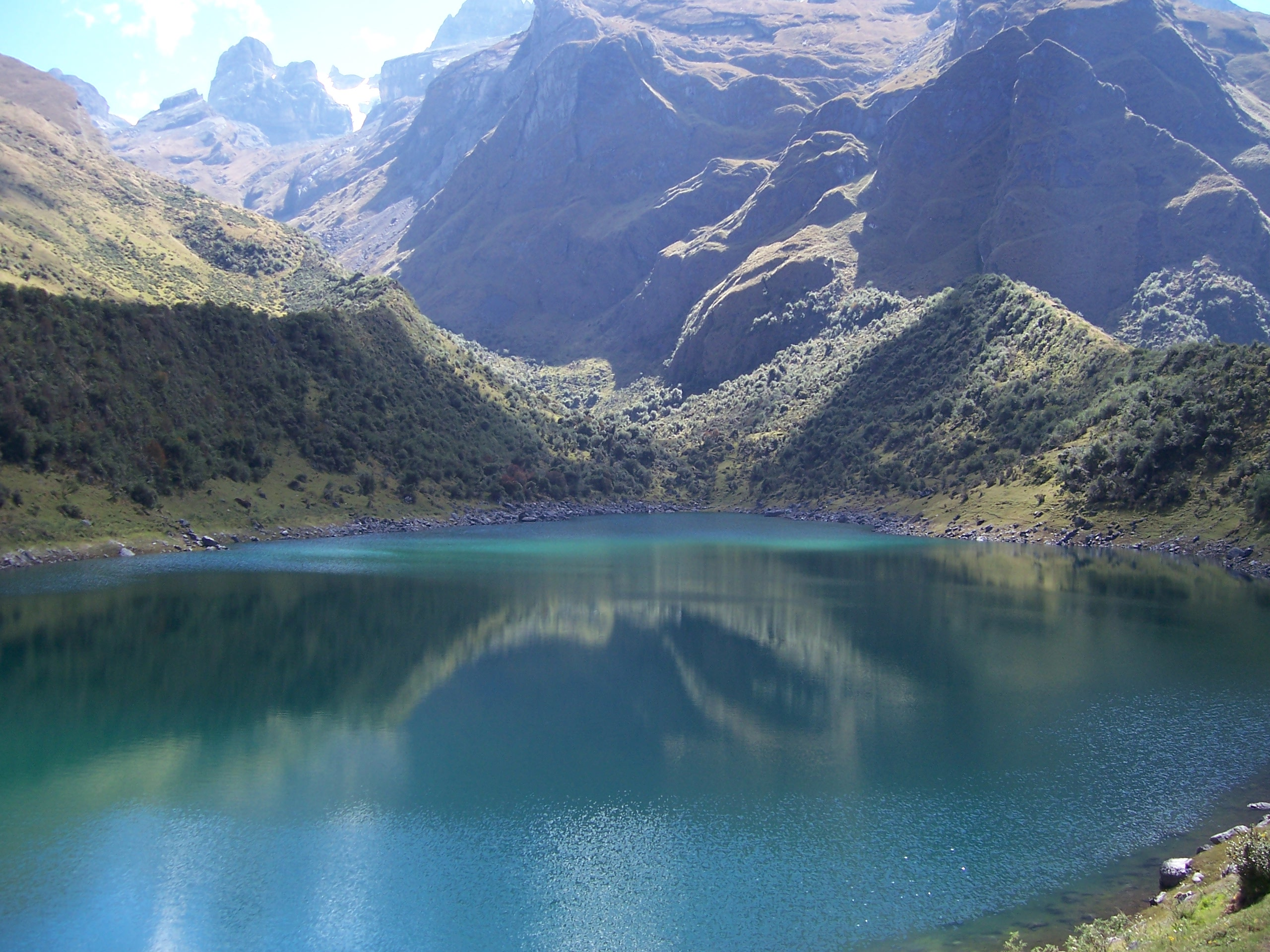
Uspaccocha Lagoon, at the National Wildlife Sanctuary of Ampay.

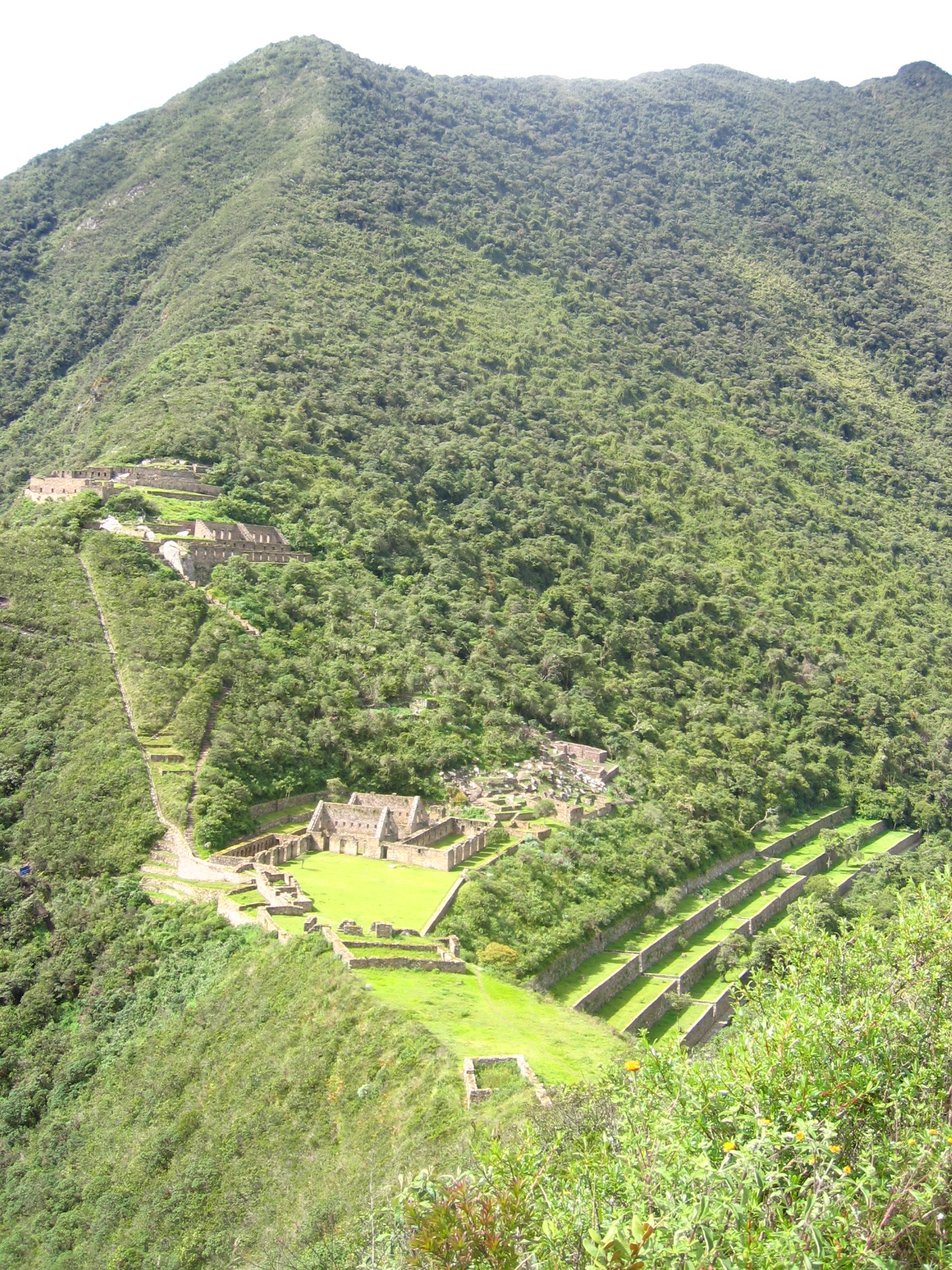
Some of the Choquequirao structures

The Pachachaca River is famous for its colonial bridge and its rapids where canyoneering and whitewater kayaking can be practiced. It is one of the best and longest Peruvian locations for this. Remains of The Pachachaca State, an important producer of sugar and brandy during colonial and republican times, is now one of the major attractions of the city.

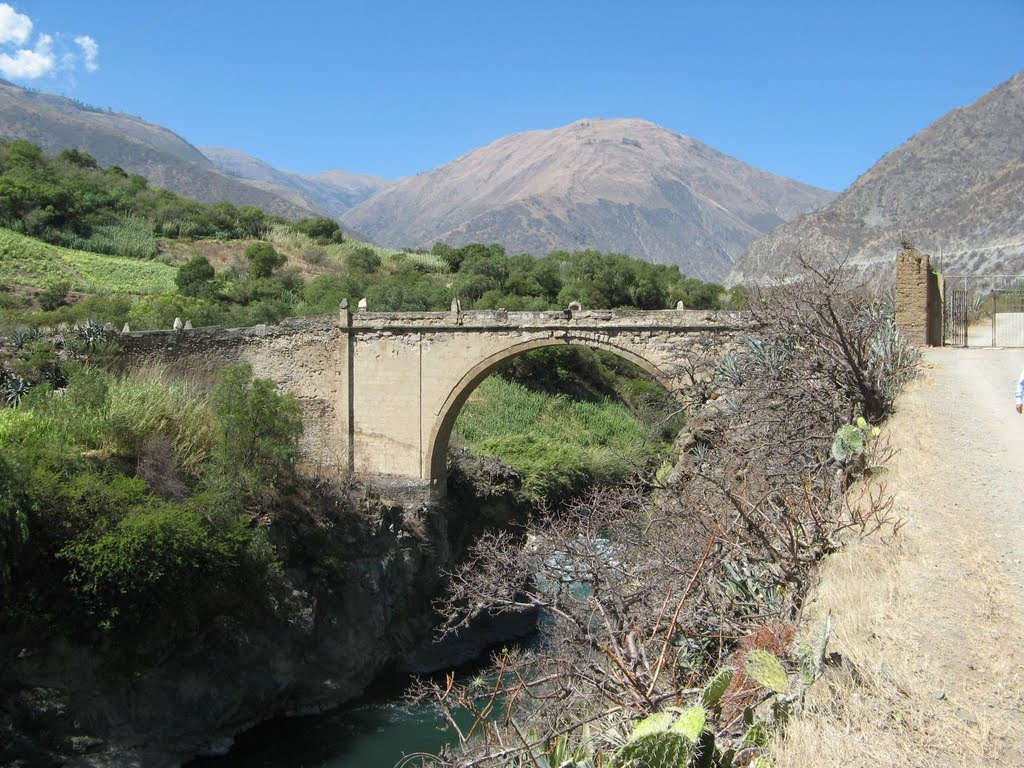
Pachachaca Colonial Bridge, Abancay

The Saywite Archeological Site, a famous temple and adoration center dating from Inca times, is located a few kilometers from the city. Therein is the world-renowned Saywite Stone. The stone is a roughly spherically-shaped monolith that has a representation of the Inca world. It suggests that the Incas had a much better understanding of astronomy than Europeans gave them credit for. There is taxi service from the city.

The Konoc Hot Springs (Cconocc, in Quechua) is a resort located a few kilometers from Saywite and is one of the best places in Peru to enjoy thermal baths from volcanic waters. It is claimed that regular baths in the springs can cure arthritis, asthma, and psoriasis.

Abancay is the gate to the Inca city of Choquequirao, next to the Apurímac River, which is considered as important as Machu Picchu. There is evidence that the real dimensions of the city are much larger than what has been uncovered, excavated and studied until now.

== Education ==
=== High schools ===
Abancay is home of the high school Colegio Nacional "Miguel Grau". Since its founding in the 1880s, it has educated each generation of the city. The main festivity of the school is on October 8, and it is a day in which all the alumni reunite and celebrate companionship. It is a tradition that the classes which are celebrating their Silver and Gold jubilees head the expensive festivities.

=== Universities ===
Abancay, despite its small size, is an important center of higher education. The city is home of one state university, Universidad Nacional Micaela Bastidas de Apurimac, and two private universities, Universidad Tecnológica de los Andes and Universidad Alas Peruanas. There are also two college-level institutions, Escuela Normal La Salle, for careers in education, and SENATI for industry-related training.

== Literary References ==
Abancay is the setting of José María Arguedas' novel Deep Rivers. Another important book that gives accounts of the history, traditions and customs of the city is "Alma y Rostro de Abancay", by Guillermo Vidalegut, a late local journalist and author.
