= Department of Apurímac =

Department of Peru

Coordinates: 14°10′00″S 72°45′20″W

Apurímac Apurimaq (Quechua)
- Department
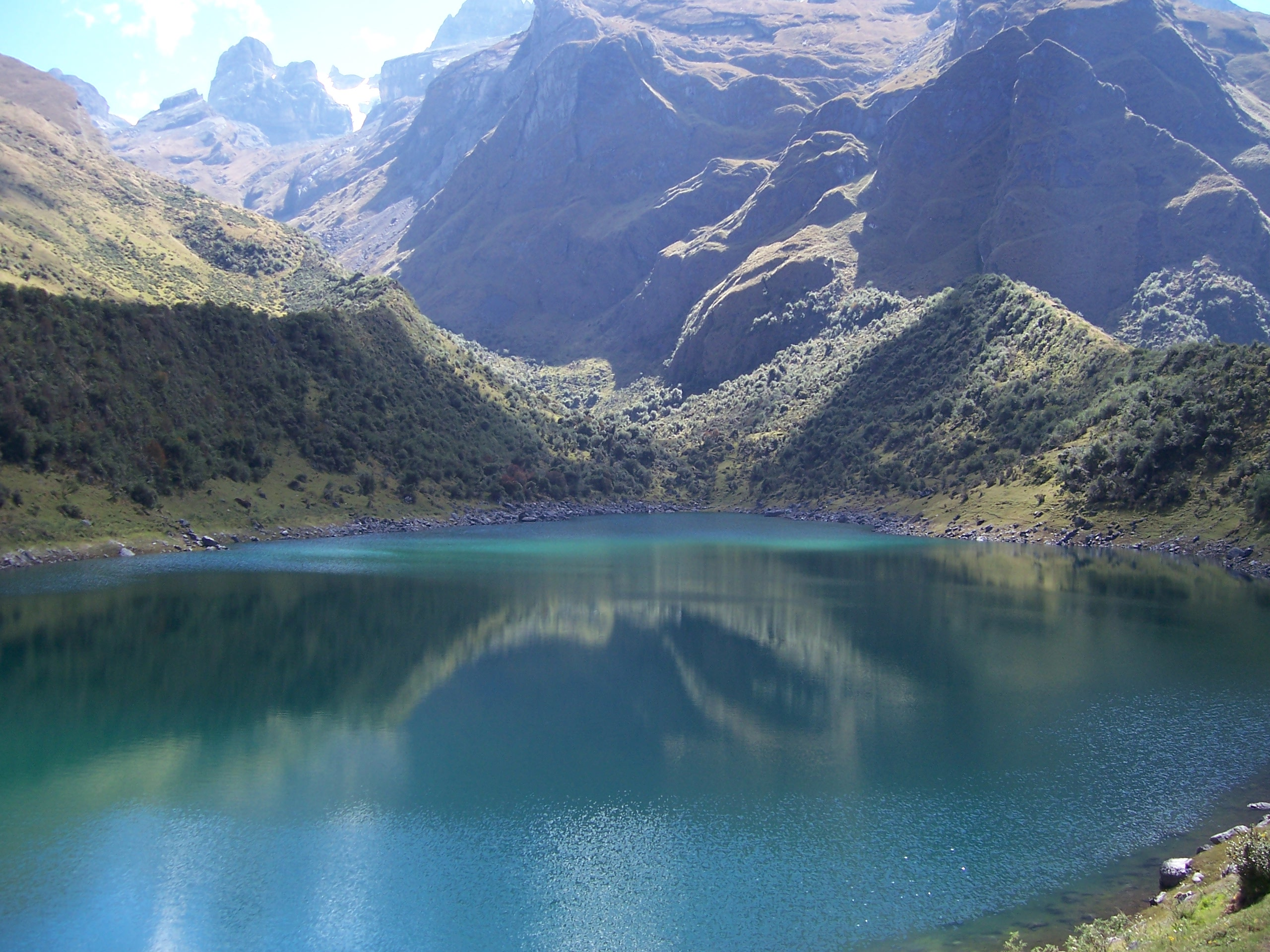
- Lake Usphaqucha with the volcano Ampay in the Ampay National Sanctuary

- Flag Coat of arms

- Location of Apurímac within Peru
- Country: Peru
- Capital: Abancay
- Provinces: List: Abancay; Andahuaylas; Antabamba; Aymaraes; Chincheros; Cotabambas; Grau

Government
  - Type: Regional Government
  - Governor: Percy Godoy Medina

Area
  - Total: 20,895.79 km^{2} (8,067.91 sq mi)
- Highest elevation: 3,952 m (12,966 ft)
- Lowest elevation: 2,378 m (7,802 ft)

Population (2025 census)
  - Total: 467,380
  - Density: 22.367/km^{2} (57.931/sq mi)
- Demonym: apurimeño/a
- UBIGEO: 03
- Dialing code: 083
- ISO 3166 code: PE-APU
- Principal resources: Fruit, maize, potato, wheat, eucalyptus.
- Percentage of Peru's GDP: 0.42%
- Website: www.regionapurimac.gob.pe

Apurímac (Spanish pronunciation: [apuˈɾimak]) is a department of Peru. Located in the southern-central part of the country, it is bordered on the east by Cuzco, on the west by Ayacucho, and on the south by the Arequipa and Ayacucho. It is administered by a regional government and its capital city is Abancay.

== Etymology ==
The department's name originates from the Quechua language and means "where the gods speak" in reference to the many mountains of the region, which are gods in the Andean religion and seem to be talking to one another.

== Political division ==
Map of provinces

The region is divided into 7 provinces (provincias, singular: provincia), which are composed of 80 districts (distritos, singular: distrito). The provinces, with their capitals in parentheses, are:

- Abancay (Abancay)
- Andahuaylas (Andahuaylas)
- Antabamba (Antabamba)
- Aymaraes (Chalhuanca)
- Chincheros (Chincheros)
- Cotabambas (Tambobamba)
- Grau (Chuquibambilla)

== Demographics ==
=== Population ===
According to the adjusted 2025 census results, around 467,000 people lived in Apurímac.

Census year	Population
1981	342,964
1993	396,098
2007	491,349
2025	467,380

=== Languages ===
According to the 2007 Peru Census, the first language learned by most of the residents was Quechua (70.58%) followed by Spanish (29.01%). The Quechua varieties spoken in Apurímac are Cusco Quechua and Chanka Quechua. The following table shows the results concerning the language learnt first in the Apurímac Region by province:

Province	Quechua	Aymara	Asháninka	Another native language	Spanish	Foreign language	Deaf or mute	Total
Abancay	43,425	189	15	32	46,510	41	152	90,364
Andahuaylas	98,774	249	25	22	35,043	12	190	134,315
Antabamba	8,771	32	3	9	2,532	6	20	11,373
Aymaraes	19,754	42	4	3	7,953	1	44	27,801
Cotabambas	38,091	70	7	9	4,034	2	28	42,241
Chincheros	38,563	67	8	6	9,154	1	160	47,959
Grau	18,958	52	2	12	4,239	6	55	23,324
Total	266,336	701	64	93	109,465	69	649	377,377
%	70.58	0.19	0.02	0.02	29.01	0.02	0.17	100.00

=== Ethnicity ===
Over 80% of the population identifies as Quechua as of 2017.

Ethnicity in Apurímac
Ethnicity	Percentage	Number
Quechua	85.7%	277,624
Mestizo	9.9%	32,152
Other	2.8%	9,069
White-Peruvian	1%	3,127
Aymara	0.3%	997
Afro-Peruvian	0.3%	820

=== Religion ===
Most of the population is Catholic at nearly 80%.

1. Quechua (85.7%)
2. Mestizo (9.90%)
3. Other (2.80%)
4. White Peruvians (1.00%)
5. Aymara (0.30%)
6. Afro-Peruvian (0.30%)

Religion in Apurímac
Religion	Percentage	Number
Catholicism	77.9%	256,430
Evangelical	17.7%	58,404
Other	2.4%	7,798
Irreligious	2%	6,525

=== Literacy ===
80.8% (324,938) of the population is literate and 19.2% (77,347) of the population is illiterate.

== History ==
Little is known about the region's origins. However, chroniclers noted that the first settlers were formed by tribes of several regions originating among the Quechua and Aymaras. The Chancas, originally from Choclococha and Huancavelica, settled in the region of Andahuaylas. The group of tribes was historically known as rebellious and fearless warriors of ancient Peru.

Chronicles relate that the Chancas prepared themselves for years to conquer the imperial city of Cusco. The great figure and strategy of Inca Pachacutec was necessary for the Inca Empire not to yield.

When the conquerors established the first political organization of the Colony, almost the whole extension of the current region had become under the jurisdiction of the authorities of Huamanga; nevertheless, there is no recollection on the foundation of cities and towns.

At the beginning of the Republic, Abancay belonged to Cusco. It was not until April 28, 1873, that a law was given to create the department of Apurímac, based on the provinces of Andahuaylas (Ayacucho), Antabamba, Aymaraes and Cotabambas (Cusco), and naming Abancay as its capital.

== Attractions ==
Abancay is the capital and most important economic and political center. Also, in the region is Andahuaylas, a rather cold city, located at 2980 meters above sea level (9,800 ft) and the region's agricultural centre. Its main church is the Cathedral de San Pedro, built in colonial style architecture. A one-piece stone fountain stands out in the Plaza de Armas. Close to Abancay in the way to Cusco is the famed Saywite Stone.

Another notable place favored by visitors is Talavera de la Reyna, located 4 km (2.5 mi) from Andahuaylas. The main square or Plaza de Armas is remarkable, built in stone with an impressive tower with a clock. Nearby, the thermal baths of Hualalache may be visited. Chalhuanca, the capital of the province of Aymaraes, located at 2,800 m (2,100 ft), preserves beautiful churches built during colonial times, containing fine wood carvings and gold leaf. A detailed account of Apurímac's architecture can be found in the works of the Peruvian writer and architect Armando Arteaga.

In Antabamba, trepanations so accurately performed that astonishing medicines have been found there, in addition to mud sculptures, weapons, domestic utensils, and hunting implements.

Considered one of the largest and most beautiful lakes of Peru, Paqucha Lake is located at 3,000 m (9,800 ft) in the route between Andahuaylas and Abancay. Known as a place to rest and enjoy nature, fishing and duck hunting are permitted.

== Local customs ==
=== Typical dishes and beverages ===
A typical Apurímac Region dish is the wathiya. Traceable to ancient times, this is prepared by building a fire surrounded by stones, on the center of which potatoes are placed until done. The ancient settlers used to prepare it during sowing and harvesting.

A dish that is also well known in Apurímac is potatoes and eggs with uchullaqwa, a sauce made with chili, cottage cheese and Tagetes minuta, a culinary herb known in Peru as wakatay, a word that derives from the Quechua language. Among the variety of breads, we find rejillas, tarapacos, paltos and roscas.

=== Festivities ===
January 1 through 6 feature New Year's celebrations in Andahuaylas. During this period the Baja de Negros (dancers disguised as black men) is celebrated. There is entertainment of all sorts, especially religious folklore.

February is celebrated with Carnivals. The whole town fills the streets to participate in La Yunsa. It is the only opportunity in which Apurímac shows all its folklore, with disguised groups dancing through all quarters. In Andahuaylas, women and men dance in groups day and night. In Grau, bullfights are organized, and the day before, the torril velacuy or velada de toros takes place to drive away evil spirits and avoid any harm to the toreros. In Aymaraes, a sling tournament between several districts takes place, a kind of duel, at times typically leaving several participants wounded.

May 13. Fiesta de la Virgen de Fátima. A great demonstration of folklore, especially music and dance. Numerous musical groups arrive to Grau to show their arts.

June 24. Farm Products and Livestock Fair in Pachaconas (Antabamba), where the best products of the region are exhibited. A majordomo, called Carguyoc, is in charge of entertaining the guests.

July 28. Yawar Fiesta ("blood festival") in Andahuaylas. A special bullfight in which a condor is tied to the back of the bull. In its efforts to release itself from the back of the bull, the condor wounds the bull. The bull is then killed by the condor, or by the villagers. The condor is released after the fiesta. Also, there are cockfights and the traditional ride to the lake Paqucha, for good trout fishing.

August 15. Fiesta de la Virgen de la Asunción. The people of Grau crowd the streets to take part in processions and prayers. Simultaneously, the tinka or branding of the cattle takes place. In Cotabambas, the festivity is celebrated with the Yawar Fiesta.

September 8. Fiesta de Nuestra Señora de Cocharcas. This Marian advocation is also known as Machacha Cocharcas and is one of the most adored in Apurimac and throughout Peru since the sixteenth century.

September 24. Fiesta de Nuestra Señora de las Mercedes. The whole town of Antabamba is invited to dance, drink, eat or to the bullfights and horse racing.

October 7. Fiesta de la Virgen del Rosario. Everyone in Abancay takes part. There are processions and fireworks. The alferado or majordomo is responsible for the expenses of the feast.

November 3. The anniversary of the city of Abancay. Celebrated with several sports, folklore and social activities. Also, cockfights and bullfights.

December 8. Fiesta de la Virgen de la Concepción. In Cotabambas, dancing is featured in the main square during three or four nights, before and after the celebrations.

December 25. During Christmas Eve and Christmas, the people of Cotabambas go out to dance in the streets together with disguised dancers. Large crowds salute the Holy Child in adoration with songs and prayers. There are also processions, fireworks and banquets with typical food.

== Notable people ==
- Juan Espinoza Medrano, born in Calcauso, Antabamba. An important baroque writer and priest.
- José María Arguedas, born in Andahuaylas, poet, novelist and anthropologist. Author of Los Ríos Profundos, Todas las Sangres, El Zorro de Arriba y El Zorro de Abajo
- Fredy Roncalla, poet, essayist, jewelry maker.
- María Isabel Granda y Larco, known as Chabuca Granda. One of the most important singers of Peru

== See also ==
- Ampay National Sanctuary
