= Ayapata District =

Coordinates: 13°46′40″S 70°19′21″W

Ayapata
- District
- Interactive map of Ayapata
- Country: Peru
- Region: Puno
- Province: Carabaya
- Capital: Ayapata

Government
  - Mayor: Javier Grimaldo Pariapaza Arraya

Area
  - Total: 1,091.61 km^{2} (421.47 sq mi)
- Elevation: 3,475 m (11,401 ft)

Population (2005 census)
  - Total: 6,820
  - Density: 6.25/km^{2} (16.2/sq mi)
- Time zone: UTC-5 (PET)
- UBIGEO: 210303

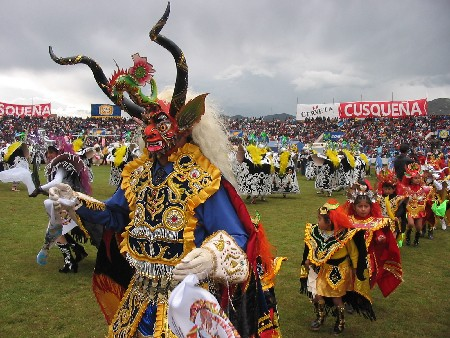
Diablada puneña during the Fiesta de la Candelaria in Peru.

Ayapata District is one of ten districts of the province Carabaya in Peru.

== Geography ==
The Kallawaya mountain range traverses the district. The highest peak of the district is Allin Qhapaq at 5,780 m (18,963 ft). Other mountains are listed below:

- Apachita
- Chawpi Tiyana
- Ch'ichi Qhapaq
- Hatun Qillwani
- Kuntur Wachana
- Muru Quta
- Ñuñu Pampa
- Pichanayuq
- Pukara
- Sach'a Pata
- Tawqa Qaqa
- Turuni
- Wari Kunka
- Wayna Qhapaq
- Muru Quta
- Wallata Wachana
- Wisk'achani

== Ethnic groups ==
The people in the district are mainly indigenous citizens of Quechua descent. Quechua is the language which the majority of the population (82.61%) learnt to speak in childhood, 16.22% of the residents started speaking using the Spanish language (2007 Peru Census).

== See also ==
- Inambari River
- Yawarmayu
