= Yurac Huayruro =

Mountain in Peru

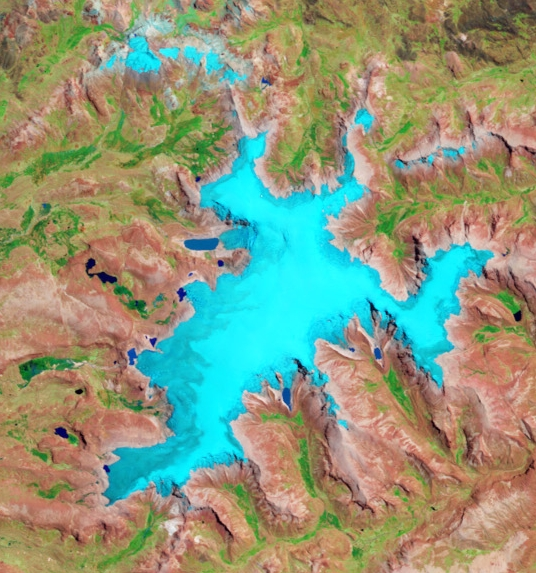
- The glaciated Quelccaya area with Yurac Huayruro shown in the upper right edge of this image (NASA, 2010)

Highest point
- Elevation: 5,000 m (16,000 ft)
- Coordinates: 13°51′01″S 70°46′02″W

Geography
- Location within Peru
- Location: Peru, Puno Region
- Parent range: Andes, Vilcanota

Yurac Huayruro (possibly from Quechua yuraq white, wayruru a type of tree, Aymara wayruru red and black seeds of a plant (Abrus precatorius, Ormosia coccinea or Ormosia minor); also meaning something very beautiful, "white wayruru") is a mountain in the Vilcanota mountain range in the Andes of Peru, about 5,000 metres (16,404 ft) high. It is located in the Puno Region, Carabaya Province, Corani District, northeast of the large glaciated area of Quelccaya (Quechua for "snow plain"). Yurac Huayruro lies northwest of Tarucani and Jachatira and northeast of Cunorana.
