= Jaquehuata =

Mountain in Peru

- Location within Peru

Highest point
- Elevation: 4,800 m (15,700 ft)
- Coordinates: 13°55′46″S 70°44′44″W

Geography
- Location: Peru, Puno Region
- Parent range: Andes, Vilcanota

Jaquehuata (possibly from Aymara jaqhi cliff, wat'a island, "cliff island") is a mountain in the Vilcanota mountain range in the Andes of Peru, about 4,800 metres (15,748 ft) high. It is located in the Puno Region, Carabaya Province, Corani District. Jaquehuata lies east of the large glaciated area of Quelccaya (Quechua for "snow plain"). It is situated at the Anjasi valley and at an affluent of the Corani River northeast of Pata Anjasi and southeast of Cuncunani.
