= Ananta Cucho =

Mountain in Peru

- Location within Peru

Highest point
- Elevation: 5,100 m (16,700 ft)
- Coordinates: 13°43′52″S 70°42′08″W

Geography
- Location: Peru, Puno Region
- Parent range: Andes, Vilcanota

Ananta Cucho (possibly from Aymara and Quechua k'uchu corner) is a mountain in the Vilcanota mountain range in the Andes of Peru, about 5,100 metres (16,732 ft) high. It is located in the Puno Region, Carabaya Province, on the border of the districts of Corani and Ollachea. Ananta Cucho lies southwest of Yurac Salla, northwest of Taruca Sayana and east of Llusca Ritti and Jori Pintay.

There is a little lake south of Ananta Cucho named Joritoruyoc ("the one with gold mud").
