= Saytajota =

Lake in Macusani District in the Andes of Peru

- Location within Peru
- Location: Puno Region
- Coordinates: 14°01′58″S 70°18′29″W
- Basin countries: Peru

Saytajota (possibly from Aymara sayt'u tapering, quta lake "tapering lake") is a lake in the Andes of Peru. It is located in the Puno Region, Carabaya Province, Macusani District, at a place named Saytoccota. Saytajota is situated northwest of the lake Tocsajota and the mountain Vilajota and east of the lake Parinajota and another lake named Saytajota which lies next to Parinajota, north of it.
