= Ollachea District =

Coordinates: 13°47′41″S 70°28′17″W

Ullachiya
- District
- Interactive map of Ullachiya
- Country: Peru
- Region: Puno
- Province: Carabaya
- Founded: May 2, 1854
- Capital: Ullachiya

Area
  - Total: 595.79 km^{2} (230.04 sq mi)
- Elevation: 2,785 m (9,137 ft)

Population (2005 census)
  - Total: 5,128
  - Density: 8.607/km^{2} (22.29/sq mi)
- Time zone: UTC-5 (PET)
- UBIGEO: 210308

Ullachiya District is one of ten districts of the province Carabaya in Peru.

== Geography ==
The Kallawaya mountain range and the Willkanuta mountain range traverse the district. Some of the highest mountains of the district are listed below:

- Allin Qhapaq
- Allqamarini
- Ananta K'uchu
- Apachita
- Ari Kunka
- Ari Kunka Apachita
- Asnuni
- Huch'uy Yana Qaqa
- Ichhu Pata
- Kiswarani
- Kuntur Wachana
- Llanthu Q'asa
- Llusk'a Rit'i
- Machu Rit'i
- Michi Michi
- Pä Qullu
- Pallqa
- Pallqa Kunka Apachita
- Pari Urqu
- Puka Urqu
- P'uykutuni
- Qachi Qachini
- Qillqata
- Qillwaqucha Urqu
- Qiwiñayuq
- Qucha Wasi
- Qullpa Qaqa
- Quri Pintay
- Qhichwani
- Q'illu Kunka
- Q'illu Sallayuq
- Rit'i Wasi
- Rit'iqucha
- Silla Kunka
- Sullulluni
- Taruka Sayana
- Turpa Urqu
- Turu Puñuna
- T'inkiqucha
- T'ipa Q'asa
- T'uqra
- Wank'a Rumi
- Warachani
- Wari Sayana
- Warmi Warmini
- Wayna Qhapaq
- Wila Kunka
- Wiskana
- Yana Qaqa
- Yana Urqu
- Yanaqucha
- Yuraq Khawayuyuq
- Yuraq Salla

== Ethnic groups ==
The people in the district are mainly indigenous citizens of Quechua descent. Quechua is the language which the majority of the population (83.96%) learnt to speak in childhood, 15.48% of the residents started speaking using the Spanish language (2007 Peru Census).

== Climate ==
Climate data for Ollachea, elevation 2,706 m (8,878 ft), (1991–2020)
Month	Jan	Feb	Mar	Apr	May	Jun	Jul	Aug	Sep	Oct	Nov	Dec	Year
Mean daily maximum °C (°F)	17.4 (63.3)	17.6 (63.7)	17.8 (64.0)	18.0 (64.4)	17.8 (64.0)	17.3 (63.1)	17.0 (62.6)	17.4 (63.3)	17.7 (63.9)	18.0 (64.4)	18.1 (64.6)	17.8 (64.0)	17.7 (63.8)
Mean daily minimum °C (°F)	9.8 (49.6)	9.8 (49.6)	9.7 (49.5)	9.0 (48.2)	7.8 (46.0)	6.5 (43.7)	6.0 (42.8)	6.6 (43.9)	7.9 (46.2)	8.8 (47.8)	9.4 (48.9)	9.6 (49.3)	8.4 (47.1)
Average precipitation mm (inches)	193.9 (7.63)	198.0 (7.80)	163.4 (6.43)	63.8 (2.51)	29.9 (1.18)	14.9 (0.59)	18.0 (0.71)	28.5 (1.12)	40.8 (1.61)	76.4 (3.01)	84.1 (3.31)	144.8 (5.70)	1,056.5 (41.6)
Source: National Meteorology and Hydrology Service of Peru

== See also ==
- Chichakuri
