= Viscachani (Cusco-Puno) =

Mountain in Peru

- Location within Peru

Highest point
- Elevation: 5,065 m (16,617 ft)
- Coordinates: 13°46′41″S 70°42′42″W

Geography
- Location: Peru, Cusco Region, Puno Region
- Parent range: Andes, Vilcanota

Viscachani (possibly from Aymara wisk'acha viscacha, -ni a suffix to indicate ownership, "the one with the viscacha (or viscachas)") is a 5,065-metre-high (16,617 ft) mountain in the Vilcanota mountain range in the Andes of Peru. It is located in the Cusco Region, Quispicanchi Province, Marcapata District, and in the Puno Region, Carabaya Province, Corani District. Viscachani lies southwest of Taruca Sayana and southeast of Jori Pintay, Tocllayoc and Huarisayana.
