= Chiajarjapata =

Mountain in Peru

- Location within Peru

Highest point
- Elevation: 5,014 m (16,450 ft)
- Coordinates: 13°50′04″S 70°34′57″W

Geography
- Location: Peru, Puno Region
- Parent range: Andes, Vilcanota

Chiajarjapata (possibly from Aymara ch'iyara black, k'ark'a crevice, fissure, crack, pata step, "black crevice step") is a 5,014-metre-high (16,450 ft) mountain in the Vilcanota mountain range in the Andes of Peru. It is located in the Puno Region, Carabaya Province, Corani District. Chiajarjapata Pata lies southeast of Macho Ritti, Tocra and Ananta near a lake named Mancacocha.
