= Huarisayana =

Mountain in Peru

- Location within Peru

Highest point
- Elevation: 5,200 m (17,100 ft)
- Coordinates: 13°45′44″S 70°43′20″W

Geography
- Location: Peru, Cusco Region, Puno Region
- Parent range: Andes, Vilcanota

Huarisayana (possibly from Aymara wari vicuña, Quechua sayana stop, whereabouts, a place where you stop frequently, "vicuña stop") is a mountain in the Vilcanota mountain range in the Andes of Peru, about 5,200 metres (17,060 ft) high. It is located in the Cusco Region, Quispicanchi Province, Marcapata District, and in the Puno Region, Carabaya Province, Corani District. Huarisayana lies south of Jori Pintay, southwest of Taruca Sayana, northeast of Viscachani and southeast of Tocllayoc.
