= Quellhuacotarriti =

Mountain in Peru

- Location within Peru

Highest point
- Elevation: 5,200 m (17,100 ft)
- Coordinates: 13°55′35″S 70°26′56″W

Geography
- Location: Peru, Puno Region, Carabaya Province
- Parent range: Andes, Carabaya

Quellhuacotarriti (Aymara qillwa, qiwña, qiwlla Andean gull, quta lake, Quechua rit'i snow, "gull lake snow (mountain)") is a mountain in the Carabaya mountain range in the Andes of Peru, about 5,200 m (17,100 ft) high. It is located in the Puno Region, Carabaya Province, Macusani District. Quellhuacotarriti lies southwest of Allincapac and south of Vela Cunca.
