= Tocllayoc =

Mountain in Peru

- Location within Peru

Highest point
- Elevation: 5,291 m (17,359 ft)
- Coordinates: 13°44′53″S 70°43′36″W

Geography
- Location: Peru, Cusco Region, Puno Region
- Parent range: Andes, Vilcanota

Tocllayoc (possibly from Quechua tuqlla trap, -yuq a suffix to indicate ownership, "the one with a trap") is a 5,291-metre-high (17,359 ft) mountain in the Vilcanota mountain range in the Andes of Peru. It is located in the Cusco Region, Quispicanchi Province, Marcapata District, and in the Puno Region, Carabaya Province, Corani District. Tocllayoc lies southeast of Llusca Ritti, southwest of Jori Pintay, west of Taruca Sayana, northwest of Huarisayana and Huarachani Tojo, northeast of Quello Cunca and east of Huaman Lipani.
