= Quello Sallayoc =

Mountain in Peru

- Location within Peru

Highest point
- Elevation: 5,000 m (16,000 ft)
- Coordinates: 13°45′15″S 70°41′44″W

Geography
- Location: Peru, Puno Region
- Parent range: Andes, Vilcanota

Quello Sallayoc (possibly from Quechua q'illu yellow, salla large cliff of gravel, -yuq a suffix to indicate ownership, "the one with a yellow cliff of gravel" or "the yellow one with a cliff of gravel") is a mountain in the Vilcanota mountain range in the Andes of Peru, about 5,000 metres (16,404 ft) high. It is located in the Puno Region, Carabaya Province, on the border of the districts Corani and Ollachea. Quello Sallayoc lies south-east of the mountains Llusca Ritti (Cusco-Puno), Jori Pintay and Taruca Sayana, west of the mountain Riti Huasi and northwest of the mountains Yana Sallayoc and Llusca Ritti (of Corani). Its ridge stretches to the northeast.

An intermittent stream originates south-east of Quello Sallayoc. Its waters flow to the lake Quicho Suytococha (Khichu Suytuqucha) and then to the river Lajamayu (Laq'amayu).
