= Yanaqucha (Carabaya) =

Mountain in Peru

- Location within Peru

Highest point
- Elevation: 5,000 m (16,000 ft)
- Coordinates: 13°46′12″S 70°39′21″W

Geography
- Location: Peru, Puno Region
- Parent range: Andes, Willkanuta

Yanaqucha (Quechua yana black, qucha lake, "black lake", Hispanicized spelling Yanacocha) is a mountain at a small lake of the same name in the Willkanuta mountain range in the Andes of Peru, about 5,000 metres (16,404 ft) high. The mountain is located on the border of the districts Corani and Ollachea in Carabaya Province, Puno Region. It lies southeast of the mountain Rit'i Wasi, northeast of the mountain T'ika Pallana and east of the mountain Llusk'a Rit'i and the lake Khichu Suytuqucha (Quicho Suytococha).

The lake Yanaqucha lies south of the mountain in Corani District. at 13°46′45″S 70°39′09″W.
