= Riticocha =

Mountain in Peru near Cusco

- Location within Peru

Highest point
- Elevation: 5,100 m (16,700 ft)
- Coordinates: 13°45′52″S 70°34′25″W

Geography
- Location: Peru, Puno Region
- Parent range: Andes, Vilcanota

Riticocha (possibly from Quechua rit'i snow, qucha lake) is a mountain in the Vilcanota mountain range in the Andes of Peru, about 5,100 metres (16,732 ft) high. It is located in the Puno Region, Carabaya Province, Ollachea District. Riticocha lies north-east of the mountains Ananta and Macho Ritti and the lakes Mancacocha and Jomercocha.
