= Morojota =

Mountain in Peru

- Location within Peru

Highest point
- Elevation: 4,800 m (15,700 ft)
- Coordinates: 13°51′28″S 70°22′21″W

Geography
- Location: Peru, Puno Region
- Parent range: Andes, Carabaya

Morojota (possibly from Aymara muru truncated, quta lake, "truncated lake") is a mountain at a small lake of the same name in the northern extensions of the Carabaya mountain range in the Andes of Peru, about 4,800 m (15,700 ft) high. The mountain and the lake located in the Puno Region, Carabaya Province, Ayapata District, northeast of Allincapac.

The lake named Morojota is situated southwest of the mountain at 13°51′50″S 70°23′25″W.
