= Pata Anjasi =

Mountain in Peru

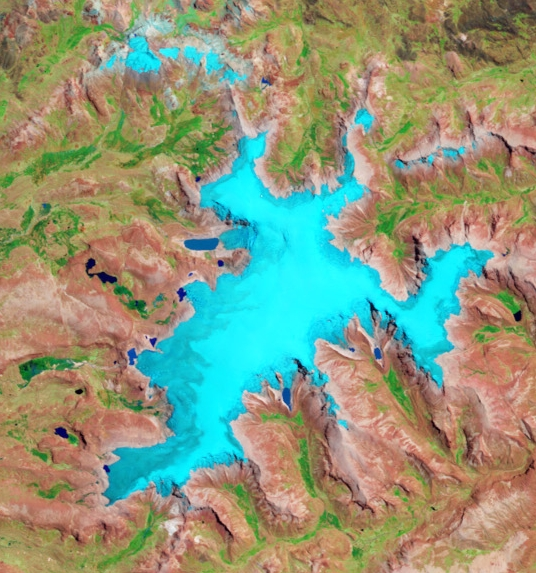
- The glaciated Quelccaya area with Pata Anjasi shown in the lower right part of this satellite image (NASA, 2010)

Highest point
- Elevation: 5,000 m (16,000 ft)
- Coordinates: 13°56′55″S 70°45′46″W

Geography
- Location within Peru
- Location: Peru, Puno Region
- Parent range: Andes, Vilcanota

Pata Anjasi (possibly from Quechua pata elevated place; above, at the top; edge; bank (of a river), shore, anqasi cobalt salt used for dyeing,) is a mountain in the Vilcanota mountain range in the Andes of Peru, about 5,000 metres (16,404 ft) high. It is located in the Puno Region, Carabaya Province, Corani District. Pata Anjasi is situated east of the large glaciated area of Quelccaya (Quechua for "snow plain") and the peaks of Jatun Quenamari, and southeast of Cuncunani.
