= Huiscana =

Mountain in Peru

- Location within Peru

Highest point
- Elevation: 4,900 m (16,100 ft)
- Coordinates: 13°39′35″S 70°41′59″W

Geography
- Location: Peru, Cusco Region, Puno Region
- Parent range: Andes, Vilcanota

Huiscana (possibly from Quechua for a kind of pickaxe, or Wisq'ana for lock) is a mountain in the Vilcanota mountain range in the Andes of Peru, about 4,900 metres (16,076 ft) high. It is located in the Cusco Region, Quispicanchi Province, Camanti District, and in the Puno Region, Carabaya Province, Ollachea District. It is situated northeast of Puicutuni and Jolpajaja. North of Huiscana there is a little lake named Huiscanacocha ("pickaxe lake"). The two little lakes east of the mountain are called Iscaycocha ("two lakes").
