= Huallota Huachana =

Mountain in Peru

- Location within Peru

Highest point
- Elevation: 4,800 m (15,700 ft)
- Coordinates: 13°56′22″S 70°19′46″W

Geography
- Location: Peru, Puno Region
- Parent range: Andes, Carabaya

Huallota Huachana (possibly from Quechua wallata Andean goose, wacha birth, to give birth, -na a suffix, "where the Andean goose is born") is a mountain in the Carabaya mountain range in the Andes of Peru, about 4,800 m (15,700 ft) high. It is located in the Puno Region, Carabaya Province, Ayapata District, southeast of Allincapac.
