= Tucuhuachana =

Mountain in Peru

- Location within Peru

Highest point
- Elevation: 5,000 m (16,000 ft)
- Coordinates: 14°04′26″S 70°14′21″W

Geography
- Location: Peru, Puno Region, Carabaya Province
- Parent range: Andes, Carabaya

Tucuhuachana (possibly from quechua tuku owl, wacha birth, to give birth, -na a suffix, "where the owl is born") is mountain in the Carabaya mountain range in the Andes of Peru, about 5,000-metre (16,000 ft) high. It is located in the Puno Region, Carabaya Province, Ituata District. Tucuhuachana lies southwest of Pumajolluni, northeast of Queroni and southeast of Allpajata. The little lake east of it is named Vilajota (possibly from Aymara for "red lake").
