= Vilajota (Carabaya) =

Mountain in Peru

- Location within Peru

Highest point
- Elevation: 5,198 m (17,054 ft)
- Coordinates: 14°01′46″S 70°16′31″W

Geography
- Location: Peru, Puno Region, Carabaya Province
- Parent range: Andes, Carabaya

'Vilajota (possibly from Aymara wila blood, blood-red, quta lake, "red lake") is mountain in the Carabaya mountain range in the Andes of Peru, about 5,198 m (17,054 ft) high. It is located in the Puno Region, Carabaya Province, in the southwest of the Ituata District, near the border with the Macusani District. Vilajota lies north of Tocsajota, northeast of a lake named Tocsajota and northwest of Allpajata.
