= Yurac Salla =

Mountain in Peru

- Location within Peru

Highest point
- Elevation: 5,000 m (16,000 ft)
- Coordinates: 13°43′20″S 70°41′13″W

Geography
- Location: Peru, Puno Region
- Parent range: Andes, Vilcanota

Yurac Salla (possibly from Quechua yuraq white, salla large cliff of gravel, "white cliff of gravel") is a mountain in the Vilcanota mountain range in the Andes of Peru, about 5,000 metres (16,404 ft) high. It is lies in the Puno Region, Carabaya Province, Ollachea District. Yurac Salla is situated north-east of the mountains Jori Pintay, Taruca Sayana and Quello Sallayoc.

There is a little lake south-east of Yurac Salla named Joritoruyoc ("the one with gold mud"). An intermittent stream of the same name flows from the lake to the north-east where it meets the river Quichomayu.
