= Tipajasa =

Mountain in Peru

- Location within Peru

Highest point
- Elevation: 4,800 m (15,700 ft)
- Coordinates: 13°46′54″S 70°36′37″W

Geography
- Location: Peru, Puno Region
- Parent range: Andes, Vilcanota

Tipajasa (possibly from Quechua t'ipa a little basket, q'asa mountain pass, "basket pass") is a mountain in the Vilcanota mountain range in the Andes of Peru, about 4,800 metres (15,748 ft) high. It is situated in the Puno Region, Carabaya Province, Ollachea District. Tipajasa lies northwest of Tocra and north of Macho Ritti.
