= Kimsaqucha (Puno) =

Lake in Peru

- Location within Peru
- Location: Peru; Puno Region, Carabaya Province
- Coordinates: 13°52′25″S 70°15′48″W

Kimsaqucha (Quechua kimsa three, qucha lake, "three lakes", hispanicized spelling Quimsacocha) is a group of three lakes in Peru located in the Puno Region, Carabaya Province, Ituata District. The lakes lie north-east of the Kallawaya mountain range, at the foot of the mountain Yana Wayllayuq (Quechua for "the one with a black meadow", hispanicized Yana Huayllayoc).

The lakes are connected by an intermittent stream. It flows to the little lake Sallaqucha (Sallaccocha) where it turns to the south-east to reach the river Yuraq Kancha (Yurac Cancha) whose waters flow to the Inambari River.
