= Ituata District =

Coordinates: 13°47′28″S 70°15′05″W

Ituata
- District
- Interactive map of Ituata
- Country: Peru
- Region: Puno
- Province: Carabaya
- Capital: Ituata

Government
  - Mayor: Roger Saya Tapara

Area
  - Total: 1,200.79 km^{2} (463.63 sq mi)
- Elevation: 3,770 m (12,370 ft)

Population (2005 census)
  - Total: 6,075
  - Density: 5.059/km^{2} (13.10/sq mi)
- Time zone: UTC-5 (PET)
- UBIGEO: 210307

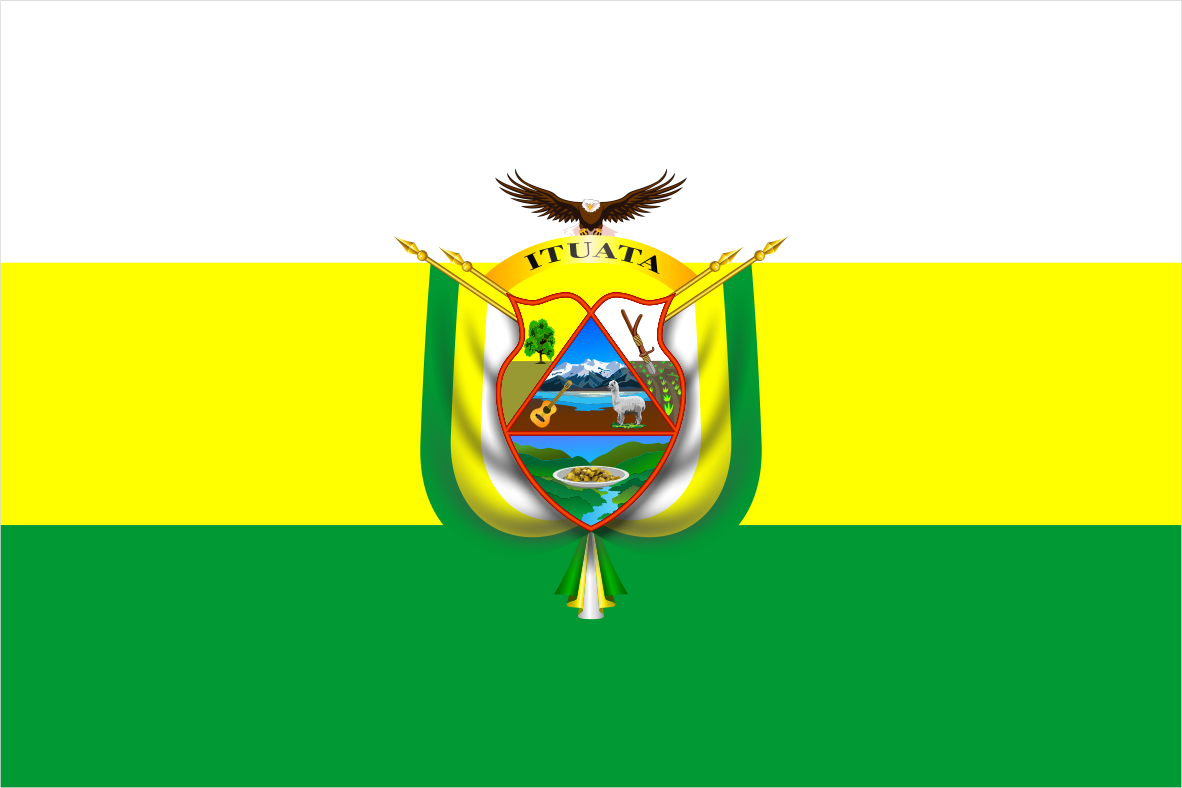
The flag of Ituata

Ituata District is one of ten districts of the Carabaya Province in Peru.

== Geography ==
The Kallawaya mountain range traverses the district. One of the highest elevations of the district is Q'iruni at 5,259 m (17,254 ft). Other mountains are listed below:

- Allpa Qhata
- Apachita
- Asnuni
- Chullumpirini
- Hatun Muqu Mayu
- Hatun Qhispi Kunka
- Jukumarini
- Kimsa Tinkuri
- Kimsaqucha
- Khunu
- Maych'ani
- Puma Qulluni
- Qulu Warach'a
- Q'ara Nasa
- Q'iruni
- Q'ulini (Peru)
- Tawqa Qaqa
- Taypi Tira
- Tuku Wachana
- Thujsaquta
- Umaña
- Usqulluni
- Waylla Tira
- Wilaquta
- Yana Warmiyuq
- Yana Wayllayuq
- Yanaqucha

== Ethnic groups ==
The people in the district are mainly indigenous citizens of Quechua descent. Quechua is the language which the majority of the population (92.94%) learnt to speak in childhood, 6.02% of the residents started speaking using the Spanish language (2007 Peru Census).

== See also ==
- Kimsaqucha
