= Chichicapac =

Mountain in Peru

- Location within Peru

Highest point
- Elevation: 5,614 m (18,419 ft)
- Coordinates: 13°56′40″S 70°22′00″W

Geography
- Location: Peru, Puno Region
- Parent range: Andes, Carabaya

Climbing
- First ascent: 1-1959: S. face-1974

Chichicapac (possibly from Quechua ch'ichi shoot; dirt, dirty, chichi naked; udder full of milk; gold powder, qhapaq the mighty one, Hispanicized spellings Chichicapac, Chichiccapac, Chichicápac, Chichijapac, Chichi Cápac) is a mountain in the Andes of Peru. It is one of the highest peaks of the Carabaya mountain range rising up to 5,614 metres (18,419 ft). Chichicapac is located in the Puno Region, Carabaya Province, on the border of the districts of Ayapata and Macusani. It lies southeast of the higher mountains Huaynaccapac and Allincapac and northeast of the lake Chaupicocha.
