= Pirhuani (Carabaya) =

Mountain in Peru

- Location within Peru

Highest point
- Elevation: 5,000 m (16,000 ft)
- Coordinates: 13°48′45″S 70°39′47″W

Geography
- Location: Peru, Puno Region
- Parent range: Andes, Vilcanota

Pirhuani (possibly from Aymara pirwa, piwra granary, -ni a suffix to indicate ownership, "the one with a granary") is a mountain in the Vilcanota mountain range in the Andes of Peru, about 5,000 m (16,000 ft) high. It is located in the Puno Region, Carabaya Province, Corani District. Pirhuani lies southwest of Macho Ritti. It is situated at the Lajamayu valley.
