= Qillwaqucha Urqu =

Mountain in Peru

- Location within Peru

Highest point
- Elevation: 4,174 m (13,694 ft)
- Coordinates: 13°37′00″S 70°32′59″W

Geography
- Location: Peru, Puno Region
- Parent range: Andes

Qillwaqucha Urqu (Quechua qillwa, qiwlla, qiwiña gull, qucha lake, urqu mountain, "gull lake mountain", Hispanicized spellings Quellhua Cocha Orcco, Quellhuacochaorjo) is a mountain in the Andes of Peru, about 4,174 metres (13,694 ft) high. It is situated in the Puno Region, Carabaya Province, on the border of the districts Ollachea and San Gaban. Qillwaqucha Urqu lies north of the river Khichumayu (Quechua for "thread river", Hispanicized Quichomayo) whose waters flow to the Inambari River.
