= Jatun Quenamari =

Mountain in Peru

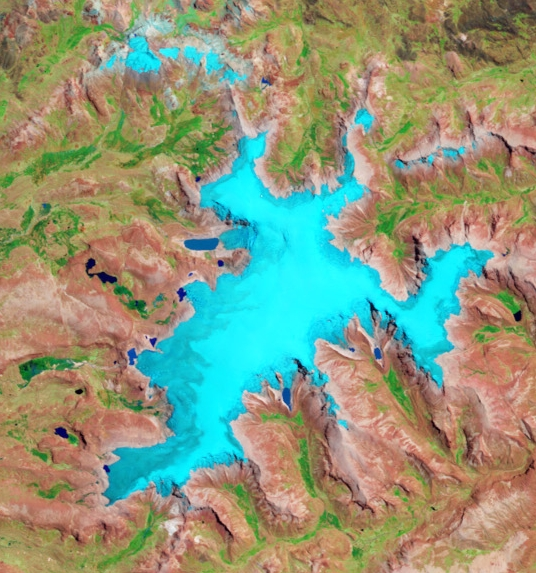
- The glaciated Quelccaya area with Jatun Quenamari shown in the lower center of this satellite image (NASA, 2010)

Highest point
- Elevation: 5,400 m (17,700 ft)
- Coordinates: 13°56′45″S 70°48′20″W

Geography
- Location within Peru
- Location: Peru, Puno Region
- Parent range: Andes, Vilcanota

Jatun Quenamari (possibly from Quechua hatun big (jatun in Bolivia), Aymara or Quechua qinamari (a possible spelling)) is a mountain in the Vilcanota mountain range in the Andes of Peru, about 5,400 metres (17,717 ft) high. It is situated in the Puno Region, Carabaya Province, Corani District. Jatun Quenamari lies east of the large glaciated area of Quelccaya (Quechua for "snow plain"), southwest of Cuncunani.
