= San Gaban District =

Coordinates: 13°26′00″S 70°23′22″W

San Gaban
- District
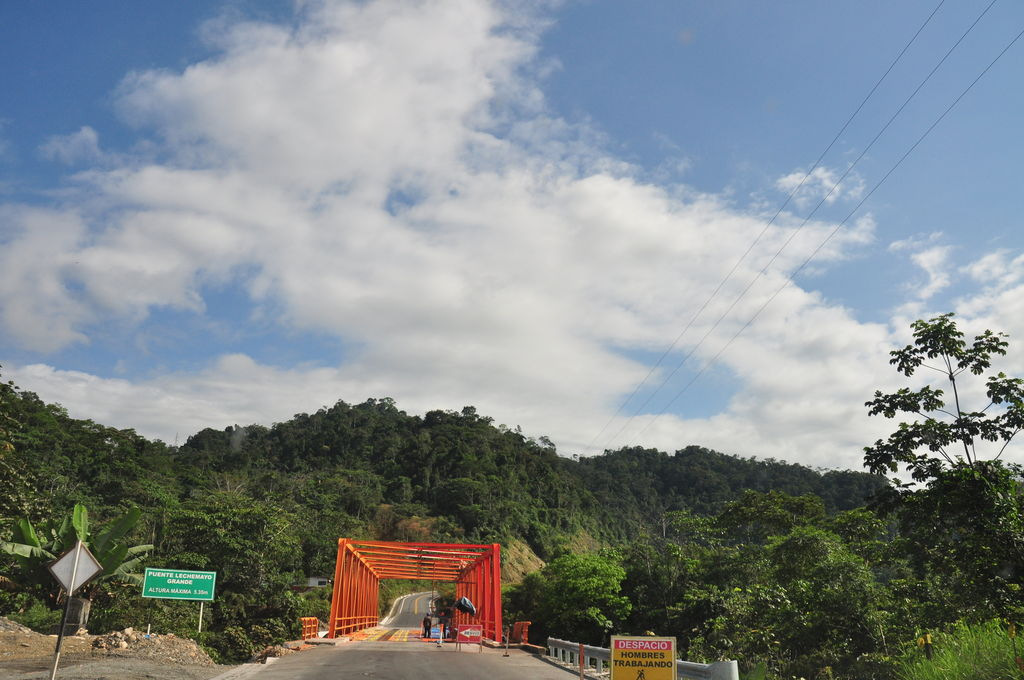
- Interactive map of San Gaban
- Country: Peru
- Region: Puno
- Province: Carabaya
- Founded: October 15, 1925
- Capital: Lanlacuni Bajo

Area
  - Total: 2,029.22 km^{2} (783.49 sq mi)
- Elevation: 580 m (1,900 ft)

Population (2005 census)
  - Total: 4,243
  - Density: 2.091/km^{2} (5.416/sq mi)
- Time zone: UTC-5 (PET)
- UBIGEO: 210309

San Gaban District is one of ten districts of the province Carabaya in Peru.

== Climate ==
Climate data for San Gaban, elevation 666 m (2,185 ft), (1991–2020)
Month	Jan	Feb	Mar	Apr	May	Jun	Jul	Aug	Sep	Oct	Nov	Dec	Year
Mean daily maximum °C (°F)	29.3 (84.7)	28.9 (84.0)	29.5 (85.1)	29.3 (84.7)	27.6 (81.7)	26.8 (80.2)	27.1 (80.8)	28.7 (83.7)	29.9 (85.8)	30.4 (86.7)	29.5 (85.1)	29.1 (84.4)	28.8 (83.9)
Average precipitation mm (inches)	864.6 (34.04)	867.1 (34.14)	723.3 (28.48)	452.3 (17.81)	306.0 (12.05)	308.9 (12.16)	352.7 (13.89)	314.0 (12.36)	307.1 (12.09)	429.1 (16.89)	514.0 (20.24)	810.1 (31.89)	6,249.2 (246.04)
Source: National Meteorology and Hydrology Service of Peru

Climate data for San Gaban District, elevation 700 m (2,300 ft), (1961–1990)
Month	Jan	Feb	Mar	Apr	May	Jun	Jul	Aug	Sep	Oct	Nov	Dec	Year
Mean daily maximum °C (°F)	28.3 (82.9)	28.2 (82.8)	28.3 (82.9)	28.1 (82.6)	26.8 (80.2)	25.3 (77.5)	25.0 (77.0)	27.7 (81.9)	28.7 (83.7)	28.5 (83.3)	29.2 (84.6)	28.5 (83.3)	27.7 (81.9)
Daily mean °C (°F)	23.7 (74.7)	23.6 (74.5)	23.6 (74.5)	23.2 (73.8)	22.7 (72.9)	21.2 (70.2)	21.2 (70.2)	22.6 (72.7)	23.3 (73.9)	23.7 (74.7)	24.1 (75.4)	23.7 (74.7)	23.0 (73.4)
Mean daily minimum °C (°F)	19.2 (66.6)	19.5 (67.1)	19.0 (66.2)	18.7 (65.7)	18.0 (64.4)	17.1 (62.8)	16.5 (61.7)	17.2 (63.0)	18.0 (64.4)	18.6 (65.5)	18.8 (65.8)	19.2 (66.6)	18.3 (64.9)
Average precipitation mm (inches)	883 (34.8)	834 (32.8)	633 (24.9)	436 (17.2)	299 (11.8)	307 (12.1)	279 (11.0)	352 (13.9)	280 (11.0)	532 (20.9)	505 (19.9)	715 (28.1)	6,055 (238.4)
Source: FAO

== See also ==
- Inambari River
- Qillwaqucha Urqu
