= Parinaquta =

Parinaquta may refer to:

- Parinaquta (Carabaya), a lake in Peru
- Parinaquta (Chucuito), a lake in Peru
- Parinacota (volcano), a volcano on the border of Bolivia and Chile, with a Hispanicized spelling of Parinacota, but also known as Parinaquta or Parina Quta
