= Quello Cunca =

Mountain in Peru

- Location within Peru

Highest point
- Elevation: 5,100 m (16,700 ft)
- Coordinates: 13°45′20″S 70°44′37″W

Geography
- Location: Peru, Cusco Region
- Parent range: Andes, Vilcanota

Quello Cunca (possibly from Quechua q'illu yellow, kunka throat, gullet, "yellow throat" or "yellow gullet") is a mountain in the Vilcanota mountain range in the Andes of Peru, about 5,100 metres (16,732 ft) high. It is situated in the Cusco Region, Quispicanchi Province, Marcapata District. Quello Cunca lies southwest of the mountains Sullulluni, Llusca Ritti and Jori Pintay, southwest of the mountain Tocllayoc and north of the mountain Condor Puñuna.
