= Tocra (mountain) =

Mountain in Peru

- Location within Peru

Highest point
- Elevation: 5,000 m (16,000 ft)
- Coordinates: 13°47′36″S 70°35′33″W

Geography
- Location: Peru, Puno Region
- Parent range: Andes, Vilcanota

Tocra (possibly from Quechua for faded, discolored, pale) is a mountain in the Vilcanota mountain range in the Andes of Peru, about 5,000 metres (16,404 ft) high. It is situated in the Puno Region, Carabaya Province, on the border of the districts Corani and Ollachea. Tocra lies east of the mountain Macho Ritti and northeast of the mountain Ananta. The lakes Mancacocha and Jomercocha lie south of Tocra.
