= Eupithecia costivallata =

Scientific classification
- Domain: Eukaryota
- Kingdom: Animalia
- Phylum: Arthropoda
- Class: Insecta
- Order: Lepidoptera
- Family: Geometridae
- Genus: Eupithecia
- Species: E. costivallata

Binomial name
- Eupithecia costivallata (Warren, 1904)

Synonyms
- Tephroclystia costivallata Warren, 1904

Species of moth

Eupithecia costivallata is a moth in the family Geometridae. It is known from Santo Domingo in the Carabaya province, Peru. Specimens resembling this species have also been collected in Ecuador.

The wingspan is 19 mm (0.75 in) in the holotype, a male collected at 1,800 m (6,000 ft) above sea level.
