= Sumpiruni =

Mountain in Peru

- Location within Peru

Highest point
- Elevation: 5,063 m (16,611 ft)
- Coordinates: 14°05′55″S 70°40′20″W

Geography
- Location: Peru, Puno Region, Carabaya Province
- Parent range: Andes, Vilcanota

Sumpiruni (possibly from Aymara sumpiru hat (a borrowing from Spanish sombrero), -ni a suffix to indicate ownership, "the one with a hat") is a 5,063-metre-high (16,611 ft) mountain in the Vilcanota mountain range in the Andes of Peru. It is situated in the Puno Region, Carabaya Province, Macusani District. Sumpiruni lies west of Catautira. This is where the Ninahuisa River originates. It flows along the southern slopes of Catautira before it turns to the northeast.
