= Jairani =

Mountain in Peru

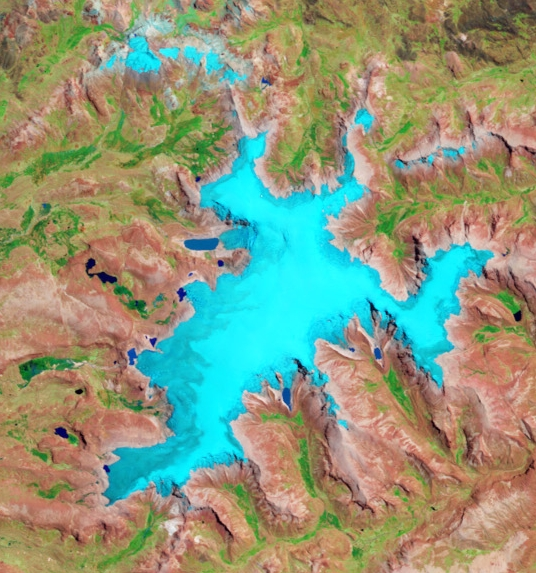
- The glaciated Quelccaya area (center) and Jairani shown in the upper right edge of this image (NASA, 2010)

Highest point
- Elevation: 5,000 m (16,000 ft)
- Coordinates: 13°50′32″S 70°46′24″W

Geography
- Location within Peru
- Location: Peru, Puno Region, Carabaya Province
- Parent range: Andes, Vilcanota

Jairani (possibly from Aymara k'ayra frog, -ni a suffix, "the one with a frog (or frogs)") is a mountain in the Vilcanota mountain range in the Andes of Peru, about 5,000-metre (16,404 ft) high. It is located in the Puno Region, Carabaya Province, Corani District. Jairani lies northeast of the glaciated area of Quelccaya (Quechua for "snow plain").
