= Muro Muruni =

Mountain in Peru

- Location within Peru

Highest point
- Elevation: 5,200 m (17,100 ft)
- Coordinates: 14°01′59″S 70°09′58″W

Geography
- Location: Peru, Puno Region
- Parent range: Andes, Carabaya

Muro Muruni (possibly from in the Aymara spelling Muru Muruni) is a mountain in the Carabaya mountain range in the Andes of Peru, about 5,200 metres (17,060 ft) high. It is in the Puno Region, Carabaya Province, Coasa District. Muro Muruni lies southeast of the mountain Chullumpirini.

Its name derives from the Aymara muru truncated, the reduplication indicates that there is a group or a complex of something, -ni a suffix to indicate ownership.
