= Macusani =

- Town
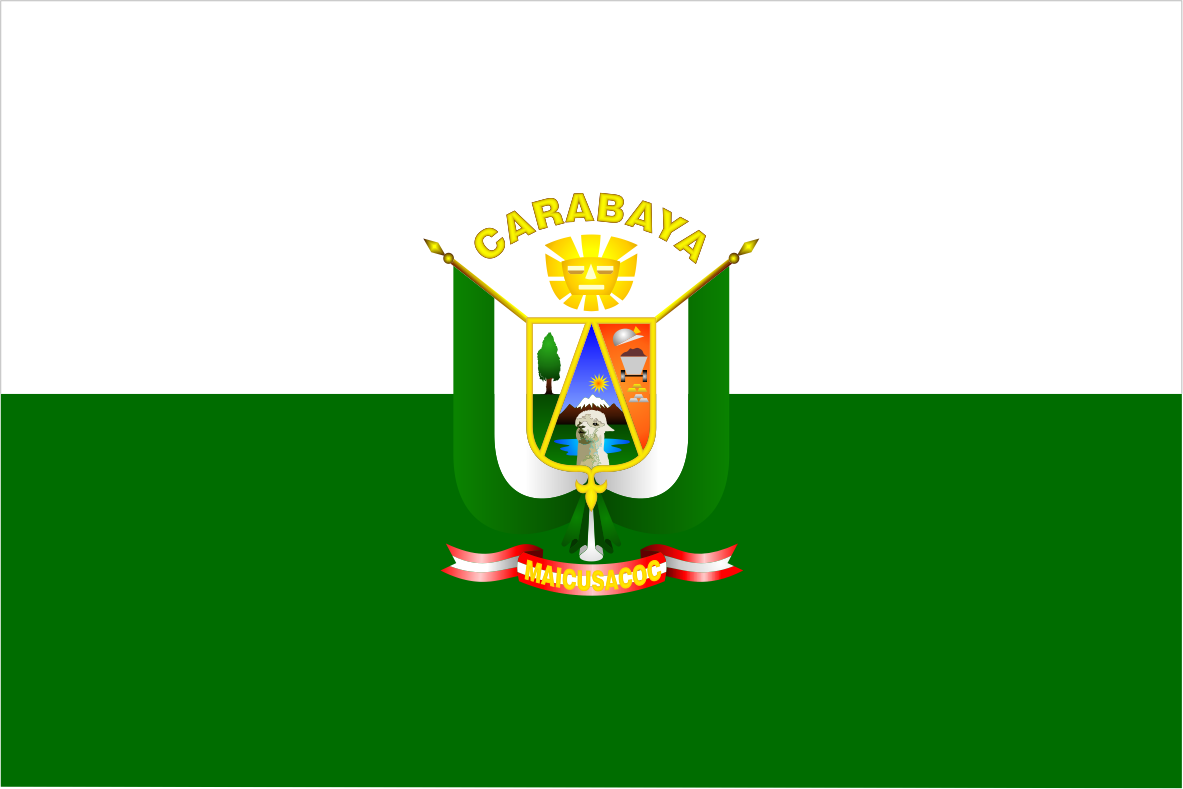
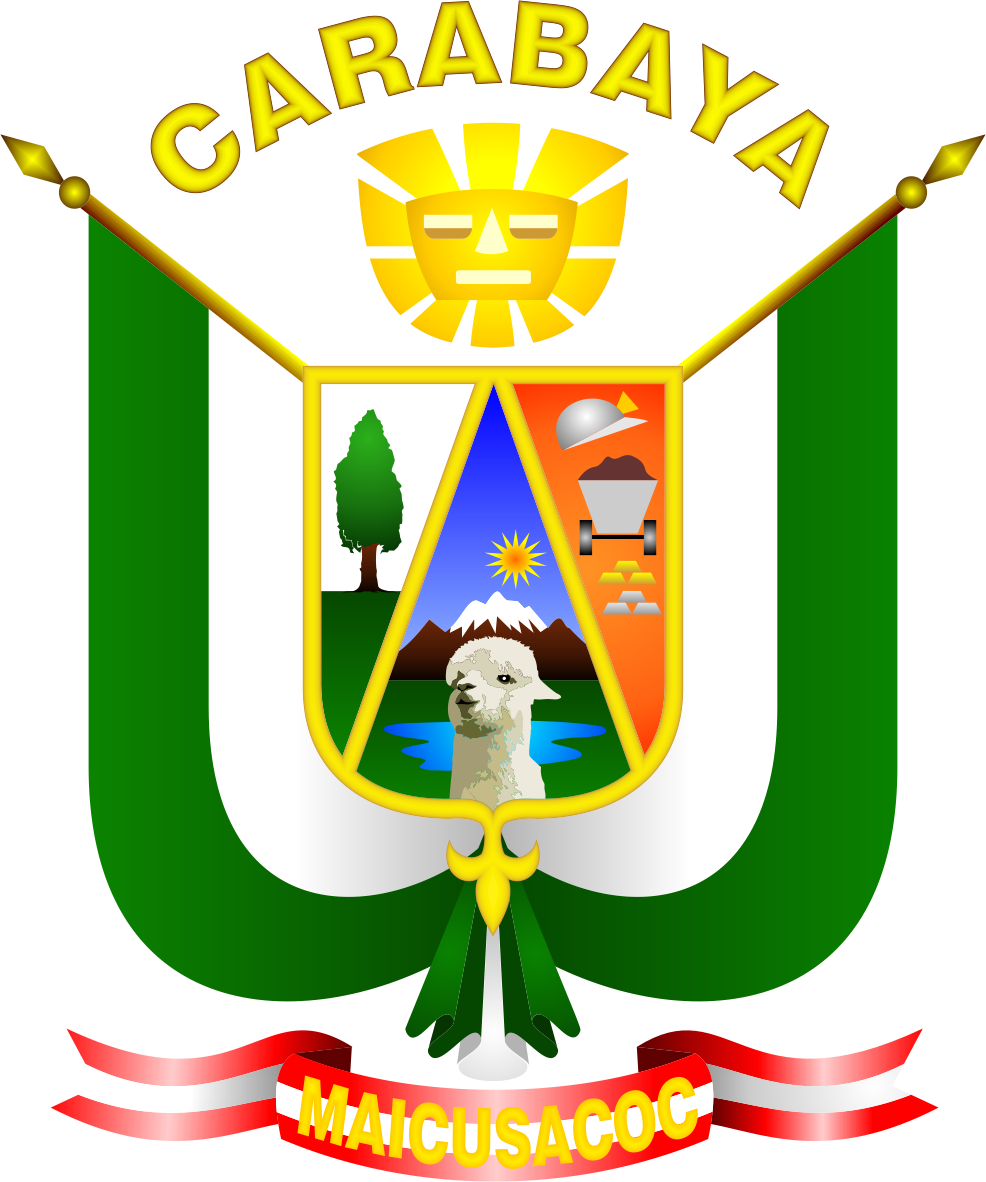
- Flag Seal

- Location within Peru
- Coordinates: 14°4′9″S 70°25′52″W
- Country: Peru
- Region: Puno
- Province: Carabaya
- District: Macusani

Government
  - Mayor: Augusto Ronald Gutiérrez Rodrigo (2011-2014)
- Elevation: 4,315 m (14,157 ft)

Population
  - Total: 11,707
- Time zone: UTC-5 (PET)

Macusani is a town in Southern Peru, capital of the province Carabaya in the region Puno.

== Geography ==
=== Climate ===
Due to the extreme altitude, Macusani is a tundra climate and has very low temperatures, even during the warmest month of the year. According to Köppen and Geiger, this climate is classified as ET. The temperature here averages 5.0 °C. The rainfall averages 726 mm.

Climate data for Macusani, elevation 4,363 m (14,314 ft), (1991–2020)
Month	Jan	Feb	Mar	Apr	May	Jun	Jul	Aug	Sep	Oct	Nov	Dec	Year
Mean daily maximum °C (°F)	11.0 (51.8)	11.1 (52.0)	11.3 (52.3)	11.7 (53.1)	12.3 (54.1)	11.9 (53.4)	11.6 (52.9)	12.2 (54.0)	12.3 (54.1)	12.4 (54.3)	12.7 (54.9)	11.6 (52.9)	11.8 (53.3)
Mean daily minimum °C (°F)	1.2 (34.2)	1.4 (34.5)	1.0 (33.8)	−0.5 (31.1)	−4.0 (24.8)	−6.9 (19.6)	−8.0 (17.6)	−7.0 (19.4)	−3.7 (25.3)	−1.2 (29.8)	−0.2 (31.6)	0.7 (33.3)	−2.3 (27.9)
Average precipitation mm (inches)	135.7 (5.34)	116.8 (4.60)	101.0 (3.98)	38.4 (1.51)	10.2 (0.40)	3.6 (0.14)	3.8 (0.15)	7.3 (0.29)	17.0 (0.67)	47.8 (1.88)	61.7 (2.43)	110.7 (4.36)	654 (25.75)
Source: National Meteorology and Hydrology Service of Peru
