= Lake Chaupicocha (Puno) =

Lake in Puno Region, Peru

- Location within Peru
- Location: Peru; Puno Region
- Coordinates: 13°57′54″S 70°24′05″W

Lake Chaupicocha (possibly from Quechua chawpi central, middle, qucha lake) is a lake in Peru located in the Puno Region, Carabaya Province, Macusani District. It lies in the Carabaya mountain range, south of Allincapac and southwest of Chichicapac.
