= Otoroncane (Puno) =

Mountain in Peru

- Location within Peru

Highest point
- Elevation: 5,305 m (17,405 ft)
- Coordinates: 14°00′58″S 70°49′17″W

Geography
- Location: Peru, Puno Region
- Parent range: Andes, Vilcanota

Otoroncane (possibly from Aymara uturunqa, uturunqha, uturunqu, uturunqhu tiger (here referring to the jaguar), -ni a suffix to indicate ownership, "the one with the jaguar") is a 5,305-metre-high (17,405 ft) mountain in the Vilcanota mountain range in the Andes of Peru. It is situated in the Puno Region, Carabaya Province, Corani District. Otoroncane lies northwest of the mountains Pomanota, Jampatune and Sapanuta. The river Challapampa (possibly from Aymara for "sand plain") flows along its southern slopes.
