= Chullumpirini =

Mountain in Peru

- Location within Peru

Highest point
- Elevation: 5,000 m (16,000 ft)
- Coordinates: 14°00′29″S 70°10′58″W

Geography
- Location: Peru, Puno Region
- Parent range: Andes, Carabaya

Chullumpirini (chullumpi local name for the white-tufted grebe) is a mountain in the Carabaya mountain range in the Andes of Peru, about 5,000 metres (16,404 ft) high. It is located in the Puno Region, Carabaya Province, on the border of the districts Coasa and Ituata. Chullumpirini lies east of the lake Laurancocha and north-west of the mountain Muru Muruni.
