= Vela Cunca (Puno) =

Mountain in Peru

- Location within Peru

Highest point
- Elevation: 5,350 m (17,550 ft)
- Coordinates: 13°53′49″S 70°26′47″W

Geography
- Location: Peru, Puno Region, Carabaya Province
- Parent range: Andes

Vela Cunca (possibly from Aymara wila red, kunka throat, "red throat") is a mountain in the Carabaya mountain range in the Andes of Peru, about 5,350 metres (17,552 ft) high. It is located in the Puno Region, Carabaya Province, on the border of the districts Macusani and Ollachea. Vela Cunca lies northwest of the mountain Allincapac.
