= Yana Sallayoc =

Mountain in Peru

- Location within Peru

Highest point
- Elevation: 5,000 m (16,000 ft)
- Coordinates: 13°46′40″S 70°41′24″W

Geography
- Location: Peru, Puno Region
- Parent range: Andes, Vilcanota

Yana Sallayoc (possibly from Quechua yana black, salla large cliff of gravel, -yuq a suffix to indicate ownership, "the one with a black cliff of gravel" or "the black one with a cliff of gravel") is a mountain in the Vilcanota mountain range in the Andes of Peru, about 5,000 metres (16,404 ft) high. It is lies in the Puno Region, Carabaya Province, Corani District. Yana Sallayoc is situated south of the mountains Quello Sallayoc and Llusca Ritti, east of the mountain Tica Pallana and west of the mountain Viscachani.

An intermittent stream originates south-east of Yana Sallayoc. Its waters flow to the river Lajamayu.
