= Carabaya province =

Coordinates: 14.069501°S 70.431245°W

Carabaya
- Province
- Allin Qhapaq, one of the highest mountains of the province

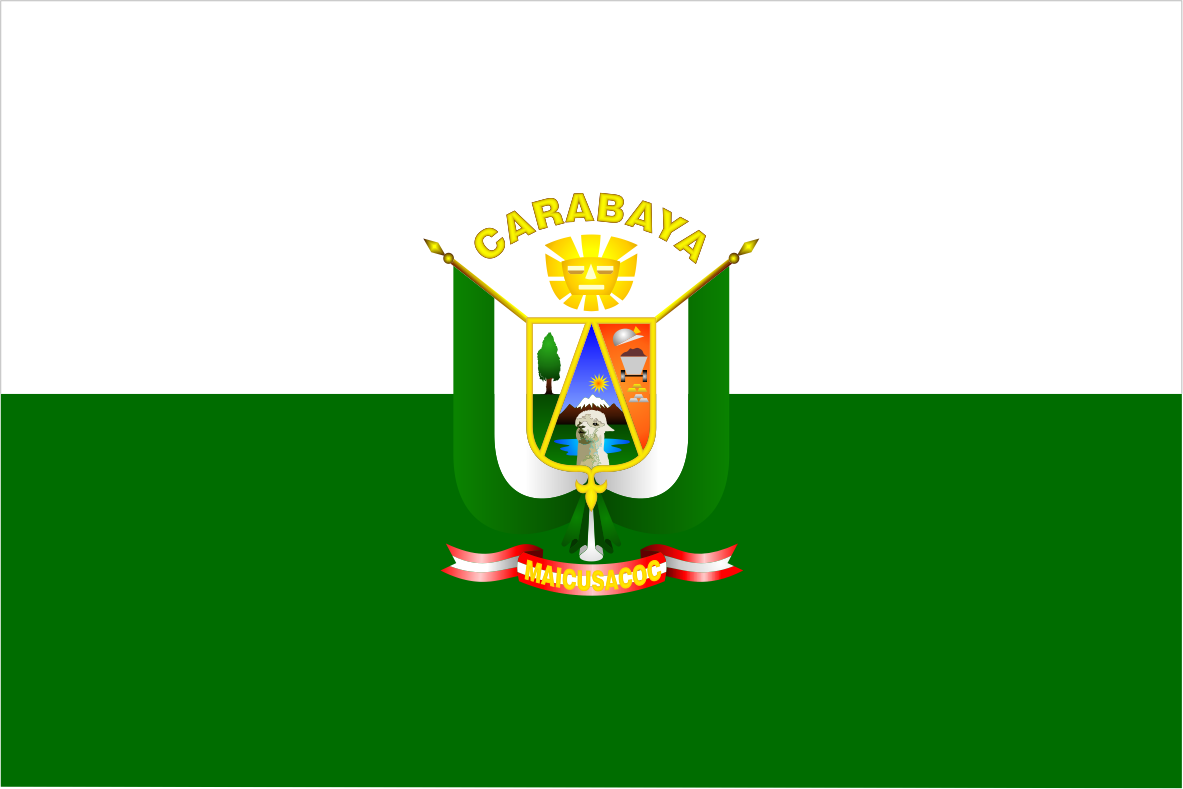
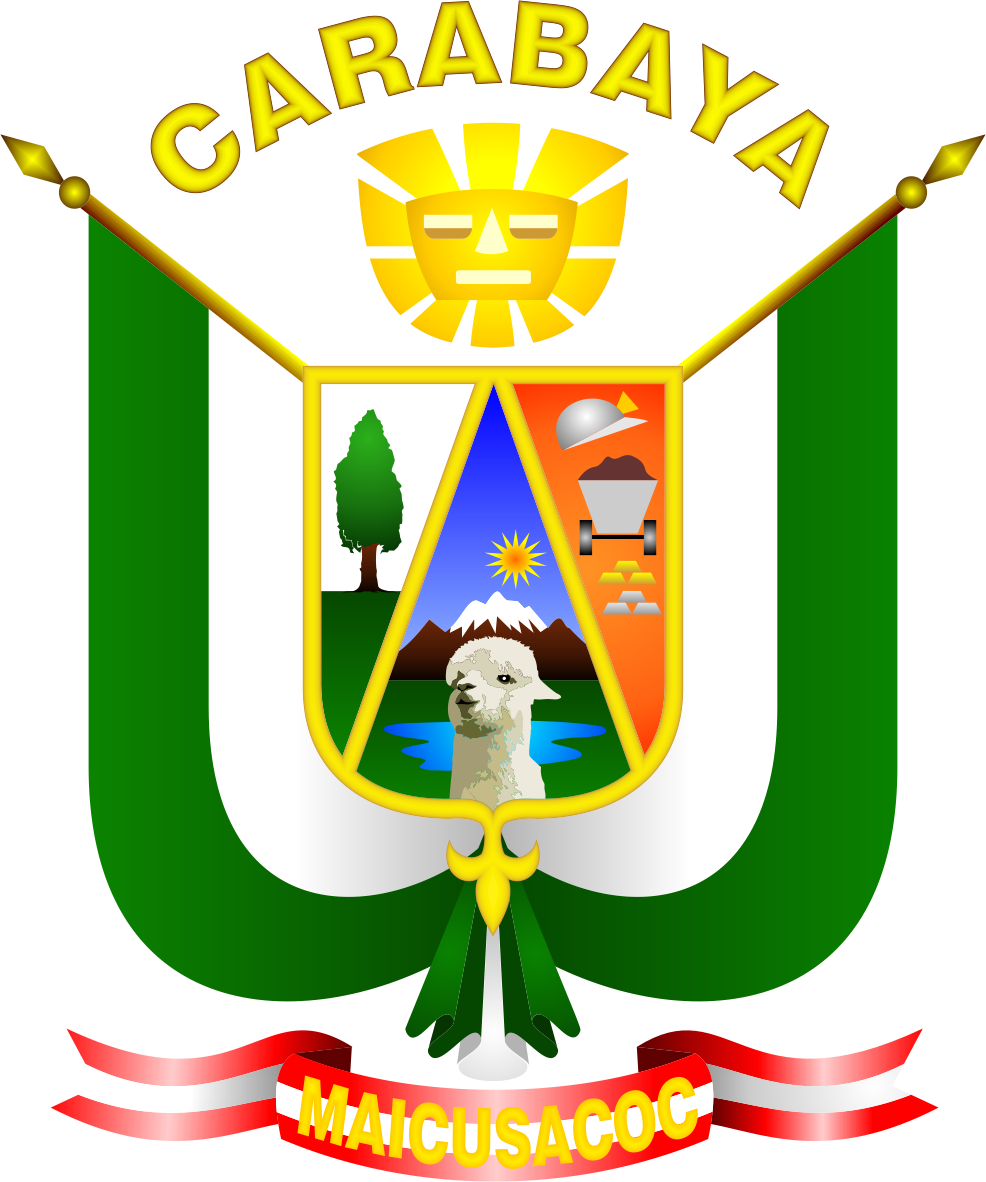
- Flag Coat of arms

- Location of Carabaya in the Puno Region
- Country: Peru
- Region: Puno
- Capital: Macusani

Government
  - Mayor: Augusto Ronald Gutierrez Rodrigo

Area
  - Total: 12,266.4 km^{2} (4,736.1 sq mi)
- Elevation: 4,315 m (14,157 ft)

Population
  - Total: 66,316
  - Density: 5.4063/km^{2} (14.002/sq mi)
- UBIGEO: 2103
- Website: www.municarabaya.gob.pe

Carabaya is a province of the Puno Region located in the southern part of Peru. It is bounded on the north by the Madre de Dios Region, on the east by the province of Sandia, on the south by the provinces of Azángaro, Melgar and Putina and on the west by the Cusco Region. The capital of the province is the city of Macusani.

== Geography ==
The province is traversed by the Willkanuta and Kallawaya mountain ranges. Some of the highest peaks in the province are Allin Qhapaq, Ch'ichi Qhapaq and Pumanuta. Other mountains are listed below:

- Allpa Qhata
- Ananta (Cusco-Puno)
- Ananta
- Ananta K'uchu
- Apachita (Crucero)
- Apachita (Ollachea)
- Ari Kunka
- Ari Kunka Apachita
- Ariquma
- Asiruni
- Ayapata
- Challwani
- Challwani Urqu
- Chullumpirini
- Chunta Q'atawi
- Ch'iyar K'ark'a Pata
- Ch'uspini
- Hatun Pinkilluni
- Hatun Qinamari
- Hatun Sallayuq
- Hatun Wayq'u
- Hatunk'uchu
- Huch'uy Yana Qaqa
- Ichhupata
- Jach'a Tira
- Jamp'atuni
- Jaqhi Wat'a
- Kimsa Chata
- Kiswarani
- Kunkunani
- Kuntur Ikiña
- Kuntur Wachana
- Khunurana (Carabaya)
- Khunurana (Carabaya-Melgar)
- K'ayrani
- Laramani
- Liqiliqini
- Llanthu Q'asa
- Llusk'a Rit'i (Corani)
- Llusk'a Rit'i (Ollachea)
- Lluxisa
- Machu Rit'i
- Maran Sarani
- Millu
- Minas Kunka
- Muru Muruni
- Muru Quta
- Pata Anqasi
- Pä Qullu
- Pallqa Kunka Apachita
- Pichaqani
- Pinkillu Punta
- Pinkilluni Urqu
- Pirwani
- Puka Kunka
- Puka Urqu
- Pumaqulluni
- P'allqa
- P'allqa Kunka Apachita
- P'uykutuni
- Qayqu
- Qayqu Tira
- Qillwaqucha Urqu
- Qillwaquta Rit'i
- Qillqata
- Qinamari
- Qiwiñayuq
- Qucha Kunka
- Qucha Wasi
- Qullpa Qaqa
- Qullqitawqa
- Quri Pintay
- Quyllur Puñuna
- Qhichwani
- Q'alawaña
- Q'ataw Tira
- Q'illu Kunka
- Q'illu Sallayuq
- Q'iruni
- Q'uli
- Q'umirqucha
- Rit'ikunka
- Rit'i Wasi
- Rit'iqucha
- Runku Tawqa
- Sayri K'uchu
- Silla Kunka
- Sullulluni
- Sumpiruni
- Surapata
- Tampu K'ark'a
- Tani Tani
- Taruka Sayana
- Tarujani
- Taypi Kunka
- Tuku Wachana
- Tuqllayuq
- Turpa Urqu
- Tutha Llipiña
- Thujsaquta
- T'inkiqucha
- T'ipa Q'asa
- T'uqra
- T'uturuma
- Unu Lluqsina
- Uturunqani
- Wallata Wachana
- Wanqani Apachita
- Warachani
- Wari Sayana (Carabaya-Cusco)
- Wari Sayana (Ollachea)
- Warmi Warmini
- Wayllapata
- Wayna Qhapaq
- Wila Kunka (Corani)
- Wila Kunka (Macusani-Ollachea)
- Wila Sirka
- Wilaquta
- Wiluyuq Urqu
- Wiskana
- Wisk'achani
- Wit'u Uma
- Yana Qaqa
- Yana Sallayuq
- Yana Urqu
- Yana Wayruru
- Yanaqucha (Carabaya)
- Yanaqucha (Carabaya-Melgar)
- Yuraq Kawalluyuq
- Yuraq Salla
- Yuraq Wayruru

Ariquma Lake, Wiluyuq Qucha and Sayt'uquta belong to the largest lakes of the province.

== Political division ==
The province measures 12,266.4 square kilometres (4,736.1 sq mi) and is divided into ten districts:

District	Mayor	Capital	Ubigeo
Ajoyani	Pedro Cutipa Quispe	Ajoyani	210302
Ayapata	Hector Arraya Cuba	Ayapata	210303
Coasa	N	Coasa	210304
Corani	Edmundo caceres Guerra	Corani	210305
Crucero	Max caceres Chui	Crucero	210306
Ituata	N	Ituata	210307
Macusani	Augusto Ronald Gutierrez rodrigo	Macusani	210301
Ollachea	Juan Huayta C	Ollachea	210308
San Gaban	Adolfo Huamantica	Lanlacuni Bajo	210309
Usicayos	N	Usicayos	210310

== Ethnic groups ==
The people in the province are mainly indigenous citizens of Quechua descent. Quechua is the language which the majority of the population (84.12%) learnt to speak in childhood, 15.14% of the residents started speaking using the Spanish language and 0.62% Aymara (2007 Peru Census).

== See also ==
- Chawpiqucha
- Chichakuri
- Ch'uxñaquta
- Inambari River
- Kimsaqucha
- Parinaquta
- Saytuqucha (Coasa)
- Yawarmayu
