= Colquetauca =

Mountain in Peru

- Location within Peru

Highest point
- Elevation: 5,000 m (16,000 ft)
- Coordinates: 14°6′23″S 70°36′21″W

Geography
- Location: Peru, Puno Region, Carabaya Province
- Parent range: Andes, Vilcanota

Colquetauca (possibly from Quechua qullqi silver, tawqa heap, pile, "silver heap") is a mountain in the Vilcanota mountain range in the Andes of Peru, about 5,000 metres (16,404 ft) high. It is located in the Puno Region, Carabaya Province, Macusani District. Colquetauca lies south of the Ninahuisa River.
