= Yawarmayu =

River in Peru

- Etymology: Quechua

Location
- Country: Peru
- Region: Puno Region

Physical characteristics
- Mouth: Inambari River

Yawarmayu (Quechua yawar blood, mayu river, "blood river", hispanicized spelling Yahuarmayo) is a river in Peru located in the Puno Region, Carabaya Province, Ayapata District. It originates near the border of the districts Ayapata and Coasa. The Yawarmayu's direction is mainly to the northwest where it meets Inambari River as a right affluent. The confluence is north of the village Yawarmayu (Yahuarmayo).
