= Tarucani =

Mountain in Peru

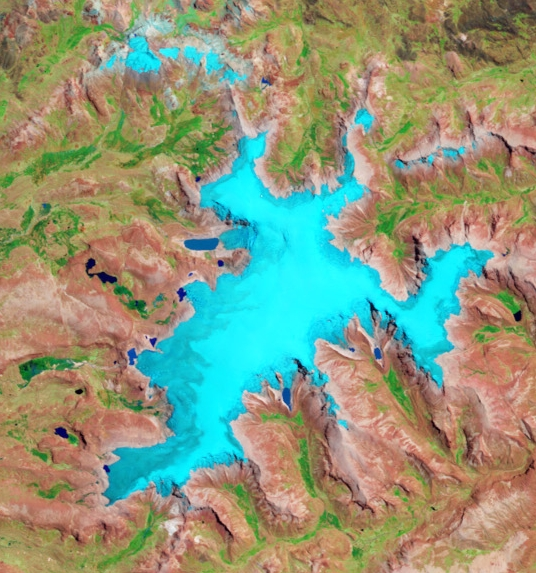
- The glaciated Quelccaya area with Tarucani shown in the upper right part of this image (NASA, 2010)

Highest point
- Elevation: 5,000 m (16,000 ft)
- Coordinates: 13°52′46″S 70°45′12″W

Geography
- Location within Peru
- Location: Peru
- Parent range: Andes, Vilcanota

Tarucani (possibly from Aymara taruja deer, -ni a suffix to indicate ownership, "the one with the deer") is a mountain in the Vilcanota mountain range in the Andes of Peru, about 5,000 metres (16,404 ft) high. It is situated in the Puno Region, Carabaya Province, Corani District, west of Corani (Qurani). Tarucani lies southeast of the mountain Jachatira east of the large glaciated area of Quelccaya (Quechua for "snow plain").
