= Chichakuri =

Archaeological site in Peru

Coordinates: 13.8500°S 70.5000°W

- Interactive map of Chichakuri
- Location: Peru, Puno Region, Carabaya Province
- Region: Andes

Site notes
- Height: 2,800 m (9,200 ft)

Chichakuri (Quechua chichaku, meaning chigoe flea (Tunga penetrans), -(i)ri an Aymara suffix; Hispanicized spelling Chichacori) is an archaeological site in Peru consisting of stone tombs (chullpa), walls, houses and squares. The place was declared a National Cultural Heritage by Resolución Directoral Nacional No. 296/INC-2003 by the National Institute of Culture on May 16, 2003. Chichakuri is situated in the Puno Region, Carabaya Province, Ollachea District, at a height of about 2,800 m (9,200 ft).
