= Allpajata =

Mountain in Peru

- Location within Peru

Highest point
- Elevation: 5,100 m (16,700 ft)
- Coordinates: 14°03′45″S 70°15′46″W

Geography
- Location: Peru, Puno Region, Carabaya Province
- Parent range: Andes, Carabaya

Allpajata (possibly from quechua allpa earth, qhata slope, hillside, "earth slope") is mountain in the Carabaya mountain range in the Andes of Peru, about 5,100-metre (16,700 ft) high. It is located in the Puno Region, Carabaya Province, on the border of the districts of Ituata and Macusani. Allpajata lies northwest of Queroni, and east and southeast of the lake and the mountain named Tocsajota.
