= Llusca Ritti (Corani) =

Mountain in Peru

- Location within Peru

Highest point
- Elevation: 5,200 m (17,100 ft)
- Coordinates: 13°45′45″S 70°41′36″W

Geography
- Location: Peru, Puno Region
- Parent range: Andes, Vilcanota

Llusca Ritti (possibly from Quechua llusk'a polished / slippery, rit'i snow, "polished snow" or "slippery snow") is a mountain in the Vilcanota mountain range in the Andes of Peru, about 5,200 metres (17,060 ft) high. It is located in the Puno Region, Carabaya Province, Corani District. Llusca Ritti lies southeast of the mountains Taruca Sayana and Quello Sallayoc, southwest of the mountain Riti Huasi and north of the mountain Yana Sallayoc.

Intermittent streams originates northeast and southeast of Llusca Ritti. Their waters flow to a lake named Quicho Suytococha and then to the river Lajamayu.
