= Jolpajaja (Cusco-Puno) =

Mountain in Peru

- Location within Peru

Highest point
- Elevation: 4,900 m (16,100 ft)
- Coordinates: 13°39′40″S 70°42′44″W

Geography
- Location: Peru, Cusco Region, Puno Region
- Parent range: Andes, Vilcanota

Jolpajaja (possibly from Quechua qullpa salty, salpeter, qaqa rock, "salpeter rock") is a mountain in the Vilcanota mountain range in the Andes of Peru, about 4,900 metres (16,076 ft) high. It is located in the Cusco Region, Quispicanchi Province, in the districts of Camanti and Marcapata, and in the Puno Region, Carabaya Province, Ollachea District. Jolpajaja is situated northeast of Puicutuni. Piqui Machay lies to the west.
