= Huilacunca (Corani) =

Mountain in Peru

- Location within Peru

Highest point
- Elevation: 5,100 m (16,700 ft)
- Coordinates: 14°03′41″S 70°44′44″W

Geography
- Location: Peru
- Parent range: Andes, Vilcanota

Huilacunca (possibly from Aymara wila blood, blood-red, kunka throat, "red throat") is a mountain in the Vilcanota mountain range in the Andes of Peru, about 5,100 metres (16,732 ft) high. It is situated in the Puno Region, Carabaya Province, Corani District. Huilacunca lies northeast of the mountains Jatuncucho and Jonorana.
