= Jachatira =

Mountain in Peru

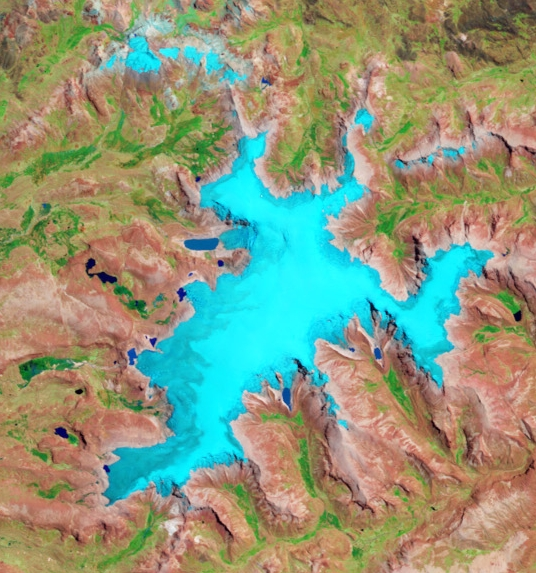
- The glaciated Quelccaya area (center) and Jachatira shown in the upper right part of this image (NASA, 2010)

Highest point
- Elevation: 5,320 m (17,450 ft)
- Coordinates: 13°52′34″S 70°45′49″W

Geography
- Location within Peru
- Location: Peru
- Parent range: Andes, Vilcanota

Jachatira (possibly from Aymara jach'a big, tira cradle, "big cradle") is a 5,320-metre-high (17,450 ft) mountain in the Vilcanota mountain range in the Andes of Peru. It is situated in the Puno Region, Carabaya Province, Corani District, west of Corani (Qurani). Jachatira lies northwest of Tarucani in the eastern part of the large glaciated area of Quelccaya (Quechua for "snow plain").
