= Puicutuni =

Mountain in Peru

- Location within Peru

Highest point
- Elevation: 4,900 m (16,100 ft)
- Coordinates: 13°40′50″S 70°43′26″W

Geography
- Location: Peru, Cusco Region, Puno Region
- Parent range: Andes, Vilcanota

Puicutuni (possibly from Aymara p'uykutu pitcher, earthenware jar with a large belly and a narrow throat, -ni a suffix to indicate ownership, "the one with a pitcher" or "the one with a p'uykutu") is a mountain in the Vilcanota mountain range in the Andes of Peru, about 4,900 metres (16,076 ft) high. It is located in the Cusco Region, Quispicanchi Province, Marcapata District, and in the Puno Region, Carabaya Province, Ollachea District. Puicutuni lies northeast of Llusca Ritti and Sullulluni. Quellocunca ("yellow throat") is the name of the ridge to the west.
