= Catautira =

Mountain in the Andes of Peru

- Location within Peru

Highest point
- Elevation: 5,200 m (17,100 ft)
- Coordinates: 14°05′51″S 70°38′56″W

Geography
- Location: Peru, Puno Region, Carabaya Province
- Parent range: Andes, Vilcanota

Catautira (possibly from Aymara q'atawi lime, tira cradle, "lime cradle") is a mountain in the Vilcanota mountain range in the Andes of Peru, about 5,200 metres (17,060 ft) high. It is situated in the Puno Region, Carabaya Province, Macusani District. Catautira lies northeast of Sumpiruni. This is where the Ninahuisa River originates. It flows along the southern slopes of Catautira before it turns to the northeast.
