= Riti Huasi =

Mountain in Peru

- Location within Peru

Highest point
- Elevation: 5,000 m (16,000 ft)
- Coordinates: 13°45′00″S 70°39′4″W

Geography
- Location: Peru, Puno Region
- Parent range: Andes, Vilcanota

Riti Huasi (possibly from Quechua rit'i snow, wasi house "snow house") is a mountain in the Vilcanota mountain range in the Andes of Peru, about 5,000 metres (16,404 ft) high. It is situated in the Puno Region, Carabaya Province, on the border of the districts Corani and Ollachea.

== See also ==
- Ananta
- Macho Ritti
