= Cuncunani =

Mountain in Peru

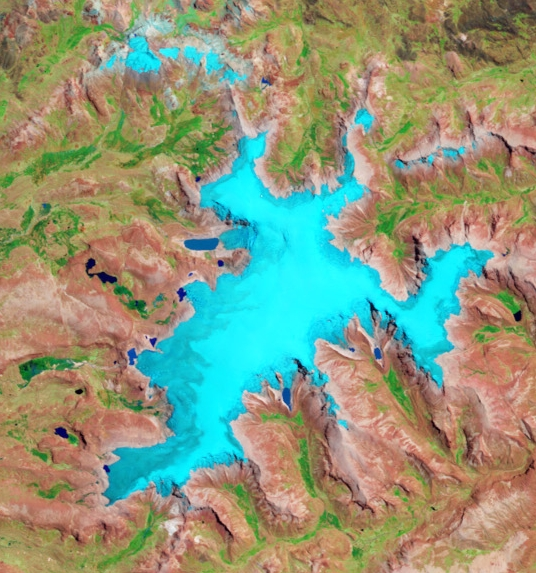
- The glaciated area of Quelccaya with Cuncunani on the right (NASA, 2010)

Highest point
- Elevation: 5,400 m (17,700 ft)
- Coordinates: 13°55′32″S 70°46′47″W

Geography
- Location within Peru
- Location: Peru, Puno Region
- Parent range: Andes, Vilcanota

Cuncunani (possibly from Aymara kunkuna a plant (Distichia muscoides), -ni a suffix to indicate ownership, "the one with kunkuna") is a mountain in the Vilcanota mountain range in the Andes of Peru, about 5,400 metres (17,717 ft) high. It is situated in the Puno Region, Carabaya Province, Corani District. Cuncunani lies in the east of the large glaciated area of Quelccaya (Quechua for "snow plain") and southeast of Cunorana.
