= Cunorana (Carabaya) =

Mountain in Peru

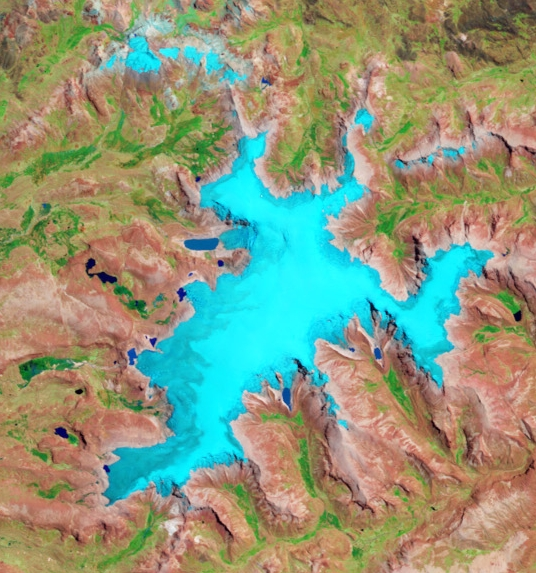
- The glaciated Quelccaya area with Cunorana shown in the upper right part of this image (NASA, 2010)

Highest point
- Elevation: 5,300 m (17,400 ft)
- Coordinates: 13°52′26″S 70°48′00″W

Geography
- Location within Peru
- Location: Peru, Puno Region, Carabaya Province, Corani District
- Parent range: Andes, Vilcanota

Cunorana (possibly from Aymara for a variety of potato of the qhini group,) is a mountain in the Vilcanota mountain range in the Andes of Peru, about 5,300 metres (17,388 ft) high. It is situated in the Puno Region, Carabaya Province, Corani District. Cunorana lies southeast of Millo in the northeastern part of the large glaciated area of Quelccaya (Quechua for "snow plain").

== See also ==
- Jonorana (Carabaya-Melgar)
