= Corani District =

Coordinates: 13°52′31″S 70°36′29″W

Corani Qurani
- District
- Interactive map of Corani
- Country: Peru
- Region: Puno
- Province: Carabaya
- Founded: May 2, 1854
- Capital: Corani

Government
  - Mayor: Guzman Victor Yana Cruz

Area
  - Total: 852.99 km^{2} (329.34 sq mi)
- Elevation: 3,986 m (13,077 ft)

Population (2005 census)
  - Total: 3,581
  - Density: 4.198/km^{2} (10.87/sq mi)
- Time zone: UTC-5 (PET)
- UBIGEO: 210305

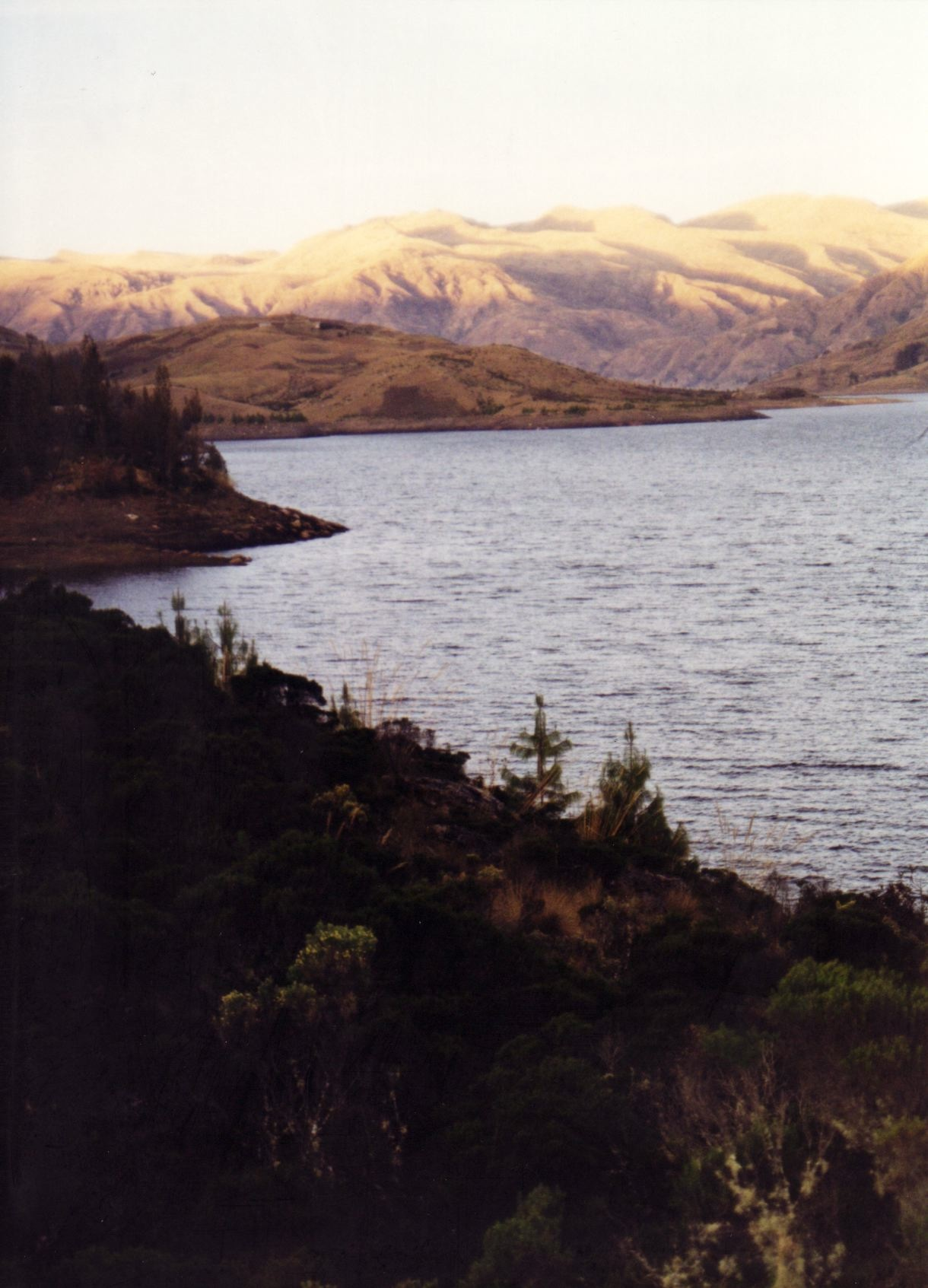
Lake corani

Corani (from Aymara Qurani, meaning "the one with herbs") is one of ten districts of the Carabaya Province in Peru.

== Geography ==
The southern section of the Willkanuta mountain range traverses the district. Some of the highest peaks of the district are listed below:

- Ananta (Cusco-Puno)
- Ananta (Puno)
- Ananta K'uchu
- Anqasi
- Aya Pata
- Ch'iyar K'ark'a Pata
- Ch'uspini
- Hatun Qinamari
- Hatun Sallayuq
- Hatun Wayq'u
- Hatunk'uchu
- Jach'a Tira
- Jamp'atuni
- Japu Tira
- Jaqhi Wat'a
- Kimsa Chata
- Kunkunani
- Kunturillu
- Khunurana (Carabaya)
- Khunurana (Carabaya-Melgar)
- K'ayrani
- Lawani
- Llipin Tira
- Llusk'a Rit'i
- Machu Rit'i
- Millu
- Pata Anqasi
- Pichaqani
- Pirwani
- Puka Kancha
- Puka Kunka
- Puka Urqu
- Pumanuta
- Quri Pintay
- Q'illu Sallayuq
- Q'uli
- Q'umir Qucha
- Q'uwaqa
- Rit'i Wasi
- Runku Tawqa
- Sapan Uta
- Sapay Warmi
- Sayrik'uchu
- Sura Pata
- Sura Tira
- Taruka Sayana
- Tarujani
- T'ika Pallana
- Tuqllayuq
- Tutha Llipiña
- T'uqra
- Unu Lluqsina
- Uqhu Kunka
- Uqhu P'ukru
- Uturunqani
- Wanqani Apachita
- Waña Punta
- Wari Sayana
- Waylla Pata
- Wila Kunka
- Wisk'achani
- Yana Qaqa
- Yana Sallayuq
- Yana Wayruru
- Yanaqucha
- Yuraq Wayruru

== Ethnic groups ==
The people in the district are mainly indigenous citizens of Quechua descent. Quechua is the language which the majority of the population (96.64%) learnt to speak in childhood, 3.03% of the residents started speaking using the Spanish language (2007 Peru Census).
