= Taruca Sayana =

Mountain in Peru

- Location within Peru

Highest point
- Elevation: 5,200 m (17,100 ft)
- Coordinates: 13°44′51″S 70°41′50″W

Geography
- Location: Peru, Puno Region
- Parent range: Andes, Vilcanota

Taruca Sayana (possibly from Quechua taruka, luychu deer, sayana stop, whereabouts, a place where you stop frequently, "deer stop") is a mountain in the Vilcanota mountain range in the Andes of Peru, about 5,200 metres (17,060 ft) high. It is located in the Puno Region, Carabaya Province, on the border of the districts Corani and Ollachea. Taruca Sayana lies southeast of the mountains Llusca Ritti (Cusco-Puno) and Jori Pintay, south of the mountain Ananta Cucho, and northwest of the mountains Llusca Ritti (of Corani) and Quello Sallayoc.
