= Parinaquta (Carabaya) =

Lake in Peru

- Location within Peru
- Location: Puno Region
- Coordinates: 14°3′16″S 70°21′48″W
- Basin countries: Peru

Parinaquta (Aymara parina flamingo, quta lake "flamingo lake", Hispanicized spelling Parinajota) is a lake in the Andes of Peru. It is situated in the Puno Region, Carabaya Province, Macusani District, north-east of Macusani. Parinaquta lies south of the lake Sayt'uquta (Aymara for "prolonged, lengthened or tapering lake", Hispanicized Saytojota) at the road between Ayapata and Macusani.

== See also ==
- List of lakes in Peru
