= Queroni =

Mountain in Peru

- Location within Peru

Highest point
- Elevation: 5,259 m (17,254 ft)
- Coordinates: 14°05′04″S 70°15′39″W

Geography
- Location: Peru, Puno Region, Carabaya Province
- Parent range: Andes, Carabaya

Queroni (possibly from Aymara q'iru wood, qiru a cup or glass, -ni a suffix to indicate ownership, "the one with wood" or "the one with a cup") is 5,259-metre-high (17,254 ft) mountain in the Carabaya mountain range in the Andes of Peru. It is located in the Puno Region, Carabaya Province, on the border of the districts of Ajoyani, Ituata and Macusani.

Queroni is also the name of a place at Chullucocha, the lake southwest of the mountain.
