= Macusani District =

Coordinates: 14°04′07″S 70°25′53″W

Macusani
- District
- Allin Qhapaq, Macusani District
- Interactive map of Macusani
- Country: Peru
- Region: Puno
- Province: Carabaya
- Capital: Macusani

Government
  - Mayor: Nancy Rossel Angles

Area
  - Total: 1,029.56 km^{2} (397.52 sq mi)
- Elevation: 4,315 m (14,157 ft)

Population (2005 census)
  - Total: 10,950
  - Density: 10.64/km^{2} (27.55/sq mi)
- Time zone: UTC-5 (PET)
- UBIGEO: 210301

Macusani District is one of ten districts of the Carabaya Province in Peru. Its seat is Macusani.

== Geography ==
The district lies along the Cordillera Carabaya, a Peruvian Andean range that runs north–northeast of the town of Macusani. The highest local summit is Allincapac, at about 5,780 m (18,960 ft).

- Allpa Chaka
- Allpa Qhata
- Asiruni
- Champini
- Chawpi Ch'ullu
- Chikuruni
- Ch'ichi Qhapaq
- Hatun Pukara
- Huch'uy Pukara
- Inka Qayqu
- Kuntur Ikiña
- Lluxisa
- Misti Urqu
- Pichaqani
- Puka Kunka
- Pukara
- Phawchinta
- Pallqa Pata
- Pincha Pukyu
- Qillwaquta Rit'i
- Qullqi Tawqa
- Quraq Kancha
- Q'ataw Tira
- Q'illu Qaqayuq
- Q'iruni
- Sallani
- Sumpiruni
- Sura Kunka
- Taypi Tira
- Thujsaquta
- Uqi Kunka Urqu
- Wamanripa
- Wamanripani
- Wila Kunka
- Wila Muqu
- Wit'u Uma
- Yana Kancha
- Yana Salla
- Yanaqucha

== Ethnic groups ==
The people in the district are mainly indigenous citizens of Quechua descent. Quechua is the language which the majority of the population (70.66%) learnt to speak in childhood, 28.51% of the residents started speaking using the Spanish language (2007 Peru Census).

== Climate ==
Climate data for Macusani, elevation 4,363 m (14,314 ft), (1991–2020)
Month	Jan	Feb	Mar	Apr	May	Jun	Jul	Aug	Sep	Oct	Nov	Dec	Year
Mean daily maximum °C (°F)	11.0 (51.8)	11.1 (52.0)	11.3 (52.3)	11.7 (53.1)	12.3 (54.1)	11.9 (53.4)	11.6 (52.9)	12.2 (54.0)	12.3 (54.1)	12.4 (54.3)	12.7 (54.9)	11.6 (52.9)	11.8 (53.3)
Mean daily minimum °C (°F)	1.2 (34.2)	1.4 (34.5)	1.0 (33.8)	−0.5 (31.1)	−4.0 (24.8)	−6.9 (19.6)	−8.0 (17.6)	−7.0 (19.4)	−3.7 (25.3)	−1.2 (29.8)	−0.2 (31.6)	0.7 (33.3)	−2.3 (27.9)
Average precipitation mm (inches)	135.7 (5.34)	116.8 (4.60)	101.0 (3.98)	38.4 (1.51)	10.2 (0.40)	3.6 (0.14)	3.8 (0.15)	7.3 (0.29)	17.0 (0.67)	47.8 (1.88)	61.7 (2.43)	110.7 (4.36)	654 (25.75)
Source: National Meteorology and Hydrology Service of Peru

== See also ==
- Chawpiqucha
- Parinaquta
