= Huaynaccapac (Puno) =

Mountain in Peru

- Location within Peru

Highest point
- Elevation: 5,721 m (18,770 ft)
- Coordinates: 13°53′50″S 70°24′56″W

Geography
- Location: Peru, Puno Region
- Parent range: Andes, Carabaya

Climbing
- First ascent: 1-1960 via S. face?: E. slopes, descend S.W. slopes-1967. --Lower peak c.5660m: 1-1960 via N.W. ridge

Huaynaccapac (possibly from in the Quechua spelling Wayna Qhapaq; wayna young, young man, qhapaq the mighty one, "the young mighty one", Hispanicized spellings Huayna Capac, Huaynaccapac, Huaynacapac) is a mountain in the Andes of Peru. It is one of the highest peaks of the Carabaya mountain range rising up to 5,721 metres (18,770 ft). Huaynaccapac is located in the Puno Region, Carabaya Province, north or northeast to east of Allincapac, the highest mountain of the range.
