= Ananta (Puno) =

Mountain in Peru

- Location within Peru

Highest point
- Elevation: 5,300 m (17,400 ft)
- Coordinates: 13°48′50″S 70°37′14″W

Geography
- Location: Peru, Puno Region
- Parent range: Andes, Vilcanota

Ananta is a mountain in the Vilcanota mountain range in the Andes of Peru, about 5,300 metres (17,388 ft) high. It is situated in the Puno Region, Carabaya Province, Corani District. Ananta lies south of the mountain Macho Ritti, west of the lake Mancacocha and north of the lake Puytococha.
