= Tocsajota =

Mountain in Peru

- Location within Peru
- Location: Puno Region
- Coordinates: 14°3′40″S 70°17′59″W
- Basin countries: Peru

Tocsajota (possibly from Aymara thujsaña to smell, quta lake "smelling lake") is a lake in the Andes of Peru at a mountain of the same name. It is located in the Puno Region, Carabaya Province, Macusani District. Tocsajota lies southeast of the larger lake named Saytajota and southwest of the mountain Tocsajota.

The mountain called Tocsajota is situated east of the lake at 14°03′10″S 70°16′43″W.
