= Quelccaya Ice Cap =

Glacier in Peru

Quelccaya
- Quenamari
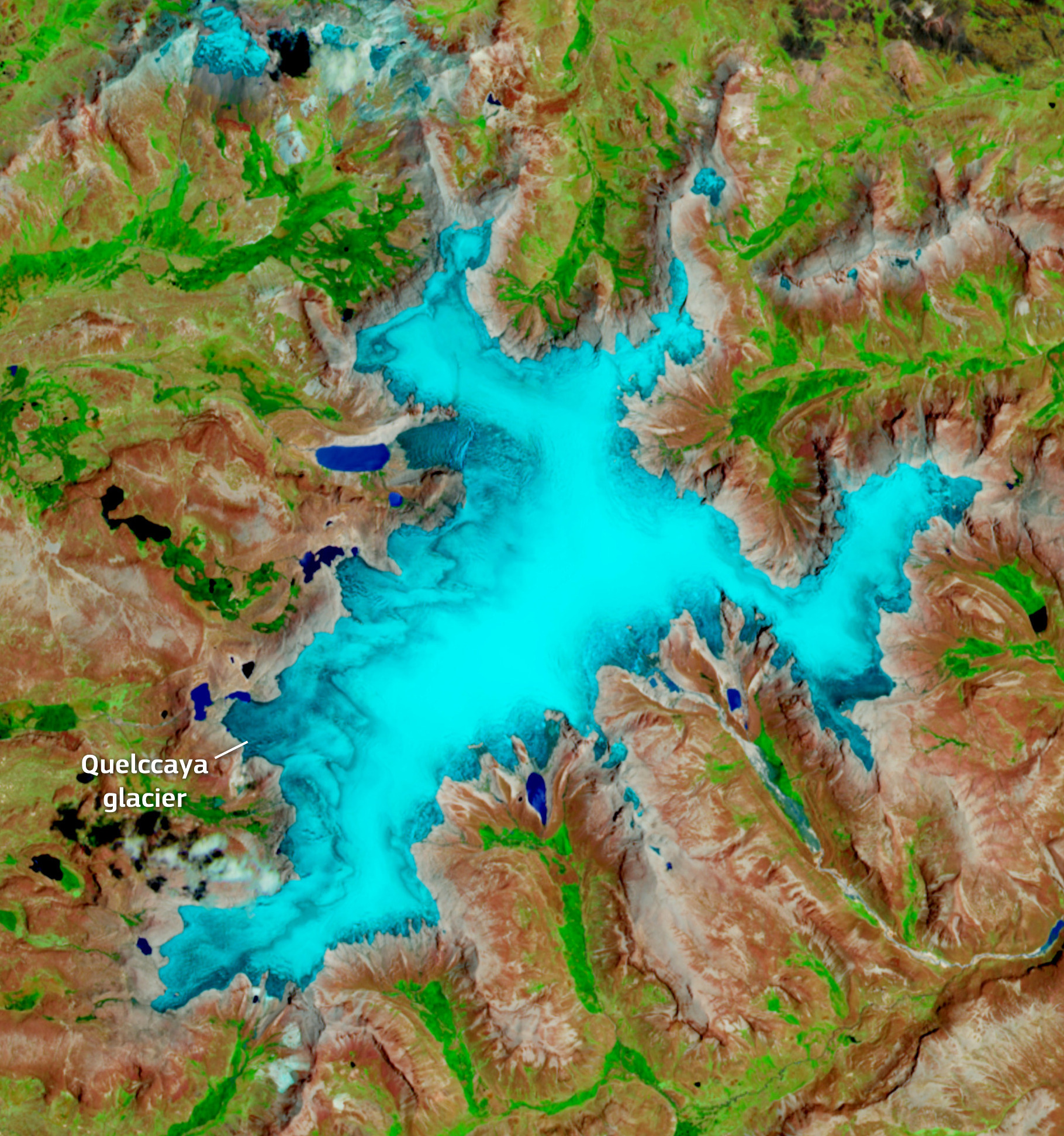
- November 2022 satellite image of the glacier by Sentinel-2.

- Location within Peru
- Type: Ice cap
- Location: Peru
- Coordinates: 13°55′30″S 70°49′03″W
- Area: 42.8 sq km (16.5 sq mi) in 2009
- Length: 17 km (11 mi)
- Width: 3–5 km (1.9–3.1 mi)
- Thickness: 100–150 m (330–490 ft)
- Highest elevation: 5,700 m
- Lowest elevation: 5,200 m
- Status: Retreating

The Quelccaya Ice Cap (also known as Quenamari Ice Cap) is the second largest glaciated area in the tropics, after Coropuna. Located in the Cordillera Oriental section of the Andes mountains in Peru, the cap covers an area of 42.8 square kilometres (16.5 sq mi) with ice up to 400 metres (1,300 ft) thick. It is surrounded by tall ice cliffs and a number of outlet glaciers, the largest of which is known as Qori Kalis Glacier; lakes, moraines, peat bogs and wetlands are also present. There is a rich flora and fauna, including birds that nest on the ice cap. Quelccaya is an important source of water, eventually melting and flowing into the Inambari and Vilcanota Rivers.

A number of ice cores have been obtained from Quelccaya, including two from 1983 that were the first recovered outside of the polar regions. Past climate states have been reconstructed from data in these ice cores; these include evidence of the Little Ice Age, regional droughts and wet periods with historical significance and past and recent El Niño events. The ice cap is regularly monitored and has a weather station.

Quelccaya was much larger in the past, merging with neighbouring glaciers during the Pleistocene epoch. A secondary expansion occurred during either the Antarctic Cold Reversal or the Younger Dryas climate anomalies. At the beginning of the Holocene the ice cap shrank to a size smaller than present day; around 5,000 years ago, a neoglacial expansion began. A number of moraines – especially in the Huancané valley – testify to past expansions and changes of Quelccaya, although the chronology of individual moraines is often unclear.

After reaching a secondary highstand (area expansion) during the Little Ice Age, Quelccaya has been shrinking due to human-caused climate change; in particular the Qori Kalis Glacier has been retreating significantly. Life and lakes have been occupying the terrain left by retreating ice; these lakes can be dangerous as they can cause floods when they breach. Climate models predict that without drastic climate change mitigation measures, Quelccaya is likely to disappear during the 21st or 22nd century.

== Geography ==
The Quelccaya Ice Cap lies in the tropical highlands of southern Peru, in the Cordillera Oriental/eastern Andes. The Cordillera Vilcanota mountain range is ten kilometres (6.2 mi) northwest of Quelccaya, and Quelccaya is sometimes considered to be part of it; occasionally Quelccaya is also linked to the Cordillera Carabaya range. East of Quelccaya, the Andes drop off steeply to the Amazon basin. The Amazon rainforest – only 40 kilometres (25 mi) away – is barely discernible from the summit of Quelccaya. Lake Titicaca is 120 kilometres (75 mi) south of Quelccaya. Administratively, Quelccaya is part of the Cuzco Department.

The Andes in Peru, Ecuador, and Bolivia are subdivided into several separate mountain ranges, many of which are glaciated above 5,000 metres (16,000 ft) elevation; Peru contains about 70% of all tropical glaciers. Together with the Coropuna volcano also in southern Peru and ice bodies in New Guinea and the Rwenzori Mountains in Africa, Quelccaya is one of the few tropical ice caps in the world; during glacial times there were more ice caps which may have resembled Quelccaya. The existence of two smaller ice caps south of Quelccaya was reported in 1968.

=== Human geography ===
The ice cap lies in a remote area. It is also known as Quenamari and is sometimes spelled Quelcaya. The ice cap shares the name "Quelccaya" with a town in the Corani District of Peru; the town's name is derived from the Quechua word k'elccay, "to write in". Since 2020, Quelccaya is part of the Área de Conservación Regional Ausangate, a protected area, and the local population considers Quelccaya an important apu, a holy spirit.

The region around the ice cap is sparsely populated. The city of Cuzco lies 130 kilometres (81 mi) to the northwest of Quelccaya, and Sicuani is 60 kilometres (37 mi) to the southwest. The closest road is still 40 kilometres (25 mi) from the ice cap and the rest of the journey can take three days with pack animals to reach the ice cap. There are several camps at Quelccaya, including one close to the northwestern ice margin. A 1974 map shows a homestead on the Huancané River southwest from Quelccaya, about 12 kilometres (7.5 mi) from the ice margin.

== Ice cap ==
The Quelccaya ice cap (Note: It has also been compared to a plateau glacier.) extends up to 17 kilometres (11 mi) from the north to south and between 3 and 5 kilometres (1.9 and 3.1 mi) from east to west. Quelccaya is a low-elevation ice cap that rises above the surrounding terrain; the ice cap lies at 5,200–5,700 metres (17,100–18,700 ft) elevation. The highest summit in the area of the ice cap is Joyllor Puñuna; its elevation above sea level is variously given as 5,743 metres (18,842 ft), 5,645 metres (18,520 ft) or 5,670 metres (18,600 ft). Another summit is about 5,400 metres (17,700 ft) high Ccoyllorhuaycuna. Nevado Jatun Quenamari and Nevado Cuncunani form eastward extensions of the ice cap. Snowline elevation has been estimated at 5,250–5,300 metres (17,220–17,390 ft).

The ice forms a relatively thin and flat structure with several ice domes. (Note: Dome-shaped parts of the ice cap.) The number of ice domes is variously considered to be two, three or four. Close to the summit of the ice cap the ice is 100–150 metres (330–490 ft) thick, with a maximum thickness of about 400 metres (1,300 ft), and as of 2018 the ice has a total volume of over 1 cubic kilometre (0.24 cu mi).

Between 1975 and 2010, Quelccaya covered a median area of 50.2 square kilometres (19.4 sq mi). It has decreased over time, and by 2009 it had shrunk to 42.8 square kilometres (16.5 sq mi) making it smaller than the ice on Coropuna, which is not declining as quickly. Before this decline, Quelccaya was considered the largest ice area of the tropics.

The ice flows radially outward from the cap. Ice cliffs reaching heights of 50 metres (160 ft) form most of the margin of Quelccaya. They often display banded layers that are 0.5–1 metre (1 ft 8 in – 3 ft 3 in) thick, and there are flutes or grooves and icicles. Over interfluves, the border of the ice cap is embayed; that is, the borders of the ice cap retreat above the areas between outlet valleys or glaciers. On the southern and western sides, parts of the ice cap end at steep cliffs like those in polar regions. From the icefalls, up to 22 short glaciers descend to elevations of 4,900–5,100 metres (16,100–16,700 ft), with lower elevations reached on the eastern side, and reach lengths of up to 2 kilometres (1.2 mi). The largest of these glaciers is the Qori Kalis Glacier, which extends from the northern sector of Quelccaya westwards. Another named glacier is Morajani, upstream of the Huancané valley. There is a contrast between lobe-like glaciers that emanate into the shallow valleys of the south-western side of Quelccaya and steeper glaciers with crevasses that descend into deeper valleys elsewhere around the ice cap. Cirques adorn the eastern side of the ice cap; on the southern side, four cirques with icefalls at their head have four sets of moraines downstream. Melting at Quelccaya occurs at the bottom, and meltwater is discharged at the margins. At the top of the ice cap, most ice loss is due to sublimation.

View of Quelccaya from the south in 2012

=== Physical structures ===
Conditions on the ice cap are polar, and the ice surface has structures such as cusps on glaciers, penitentes (Note: Inclined boards or sheets of snow.) and sastrugi. Penitentes occur especially at lower elevations on the ice cap; at higher elevations they become smaller and eventually vanish, replaced with plate-shaped ice crystals measuring 0.5–1 centimetre (0.20–0.39 in). Towards the summit, the plates are replaced with column- or less commonly needle-shaped crystals, and eventually by dendritic crystals on the summit. On the summit there are lenses of ice, probably from melting.

Reconnaissance in 1974–1977 found glacier caves in the Quelccaya ice cap, including elongated caves where the ice has overrun an obstacle thus creating an empty space, and crevasse-associated caves that form when they roof over. Caves have fluted walls and contain cave corals, flowstones, stalactites and stalagmites; these cave formations are made out of ice.

=== Physical-chemical traits ===
The ice cap contains temperate ice. (Note: Meaning that ice temperatures below 10 metres (33 ft) depth reach 0 °C (32 °F).) In 2003 the ice had similar temperatures throughout its thickness while a 1978 publication reported temperatures in the ice and its density increased with depth. Temperatures of the glaciers at the base of Quelccaya reach the pressure melting point, except at some locations. Radar data indicate the presence of water pockets in the ice.

The ice of Quelccaya does not appear to have been particularly erosive during the late Holocene, as indicated by the preservation of plant remains below it. The ice cap may have been in a temperate and erosive state when it was retreating (such as during the early Holocene), and cold-based and thus not very erosive during the expansion of the late Holocene. Cold-based glaciers do not produce much meltwater and do not erode the ground they rest on as they fluctuate.

Especially during the dry season, iron, silica and sodium accumulate on the ice cap in the form of microparticles; most of these microparticles originate in the Altiplano area of the Andes and possibly the sea. Sulfate and nitrate are also found and may originate in the Amazon; their concentrations at Quelccaya resemble these of snow in Andean regions. Particles are coarser when they are deposited during the wet season, perhaps due to wet-season storms. Diatoms, insects, their bodyparts and pollen have also been found in the ice. The composition of the ice may be influenced by the precipitation type.

During winter, most solar radiation is reflected off the ice, with an albedo (reflectivity) of 80%. As reported in 1979, 1981 and 2013, there is little energy available at the top of the Quelccaya ice cap as outgoing and incoming radiation are essentially balanced. This radiation pattern, along with temperature and wind, influence the appearance of the surface of the Quelccaya ice. Away from the ice cap, solar radiation is capable of quickly evaporating any snow.

== Geomorphology ==
The plateau that Quelccaya rises from features smooth bedrock with a slope from the northeast to the southwest but is relatively flat, such that even a small rise in the freezing level will result in a large change in the ice. The plateau is surrounded by land forms known as escarpments and a number of valleys emanate from the plateau.

On the western side of Quelccaya these valleys include, from northwest of the ice cap southward, the Qori Kalis valley, Challpa Cocha valley, Huancané valley, and "South Fork" (Note: Informal name; Huancané is sometimes called North Fork Huancané.) valley. On the eastern side are, from north of the ice cap southward, Jatun Cucho, Huasa Paco-Queoñani, Anccasi, Paco Cucho, Huayllani and Huancarane. The Huancané valley is 0.5 kilometres (0.31 mi) wide and flat and has the "South Fork" valley as a tributary. The Huancané valley runs southwestwards away from Quelccaya and is occupied by the Huancané River. Moraines from glaciers lie in the valleys radiating from the ice cap and contain alluvial deposits and peat bogs, ponds and wetlands within depressions. Clay and peat are also found incorporated in moraines; they crop out where floods have eroded into moraines. Blocky boulders with sizes of up to 7 metres (23 ft) dot the valley floors. In some places, glaciers have likely quarried the underlying rocks.

West of Quelccaya lies a high plain that is formed by glacial outwash and till. The terrain features landforms such as drift deposits, drumlins, lakes including kettle lakes, dry meltwater channels, moraines and moraine-dammed lakes, outwash fans, peat bogs, rocks bearing glacial striations or roches moutonnées, streams and wetlands.

A number of lakes occur in the region of Quelccaya and the Cordillera Vilcanota, including Sibinacocha south of the Cordillera Vilcanota. Among the lakes close to the Quelccaya ice cap area:

- Laguna Accocancha/Aconcancha and Laguna Paco Cocha upvalley from Aconcancha both south of the Huancané valley.
- Anauta Cucho and Ccomer Cocha on the eastern side of the ice cap at the head of the Huayllani and Anccasi valleys, respectively.
- Challpacocha west-southwest from Qori Kalis; it is a tarn lake that receives meltwater from Quelccaya through several channels that flow through wetlands.
- Churuyo southwest from Quelccaya.
- Lado del Quelccaya, Lado del Quelccaya 2 and Laguna 5 due west.
- "North Lake", "Base Camp Lake" and "Boulder Lake" west of Quelccaya. These three lakes lie at 5,100–5,200 metres (16,700–17,100 ft) elevation and formed within bedrock depressions when the glaciers retreated.
- Pegador Pond west-northwest from the ice cap.
- "Yanacocha" in the "South Fork" valley west of Quelccaya. It also is a tarn lake and developed in a formerly glaciated basin below an ignimbrite headwall. It currently forms a separate watershed from Quelccaya as it does not receive meltwater.

=== Geology ===
Quelccaya lies on a plateau formed by ignimbrites and welded tuffs, which are of rhyolitic composition although the occurrence of andesite has also been reported. The rocks were emplaced during the Miocene six million years ago and only little erosion has taken place since then. The volcanics may correlate with the Quenamari volcanics farther east. West of Quelccaya a Holocene normal fault runs in north–south direction, part of the Ocongate fault system; this fault system extends across the Cordillera Vilcanota and has offset moraines, indicating it is active.

== Climate ==
Annually, about 1,150 millimetres (45 in) of snow water equivalent accumulate on Quelccaya, in the form of graupel, about 2–3 metres (6 ft 7 in – 9 ft 10 in) snow (Note: Graupel - snow crystals with much rime - is common.) with rainfall sometimes occurring near its margins and also near its summit. This is much wetter than most of the tropical Andes, a consequence of Quelccaya's proximity to the Amazon. This moisture originates from the Amazon and the Atlantic Ocean and is transported to Quelccaya by trade winds; a temperature inversion and blocking effects of coastal topography prevent moisture from the Pacific Ocean from reaching the ice cap.

Most precipitation falls in austral summer during the summer monsoon, when high insolation leads to intense convection and showers. The location of the ice cap also generated orographic precipitation – a type of precipitation forced by the ascent of air over mountains. Most snowfall occurs during the passage of cold fronts and cold air inclusions; the net amount depends on the duration of the wet season. Most precipitation falls in the afternoon, but a second phase occurs during the night.

Unlike precipitation, temperatures are relatively stable throughout the year with day–night temperature differences exceeding seasonal ones. Temperatures at the top of Quelccaya are inferred to be between −4.8 °C (23.4 °F) and −4.2 °C (24.4 °F). For the margin of Quelccaya, mean temperatures have been inferred under the assumption that the lapse rate (Note: The rate at which temperature declines with elevation.) is constant. Varying between −6.3 and 0.9 °C (20.7 and 33.6 °F), the mean temperature at the margin is −3.3 °C (26.1 °F) during the dry season. During the wet season it varies between −3.1 and 2.9 °C (26.4 and 37.2 °F) with a mean of −0.5 °C (31.1 °F). As a consequence of global warming, temperatures on the summit of Quelccaya sometimes rise above freezing, accelerating the shrinkage of the ice cap.

Winds are strongest during the day and mostly blow from the west, except during the rainy season when they also come from the east or north-east. The ice cap itself generates its own downslope katabatic wind, which blows over the ice and quickly peters out with distance from the ice margin.

=== Climate variability ===
The climate is influenced by the El Niño-Southern Oscillation and by the position of the Intertropical Convergence Zone; during El Niño years precipitation is much less as westerly winds suppress the transport of easterly moisture to Quelccaya. During the strong 2014–2016 El Niño event, there was a net decrease in snow height on Quelccaya. Further, during El Niño there is a "front-loading" of precipitation with an earlier onset of the monsoon and decreased precipitation in its middle and late phase. Temperatures are also modulated by El Niño events, during which an increase is observed although winter temperatures decrease.

Ice cores show evidence of past climate variability, such as increased precipitation in the years 1870–1984, 1500–1720, 760–1040 and with drought in the years 1720–1860, 1250–1310, 650–730, 570–610 and 540–560. One of these wet periods has been correlated to the Medieval Climate Anomaly 1,000–700 years ago, while drought periods have been linked to cultural changes in the Peruvian Moche culture and the collapse of the pre-Columbian Tiwanaku empire. Apart from precipitation, climate at Quelccaya has been stable over the past 1500 years. During recent decades, precipitation has not fluctuated significantly but temperatures have been steadily increasing.

== Vegetation and animal life ==
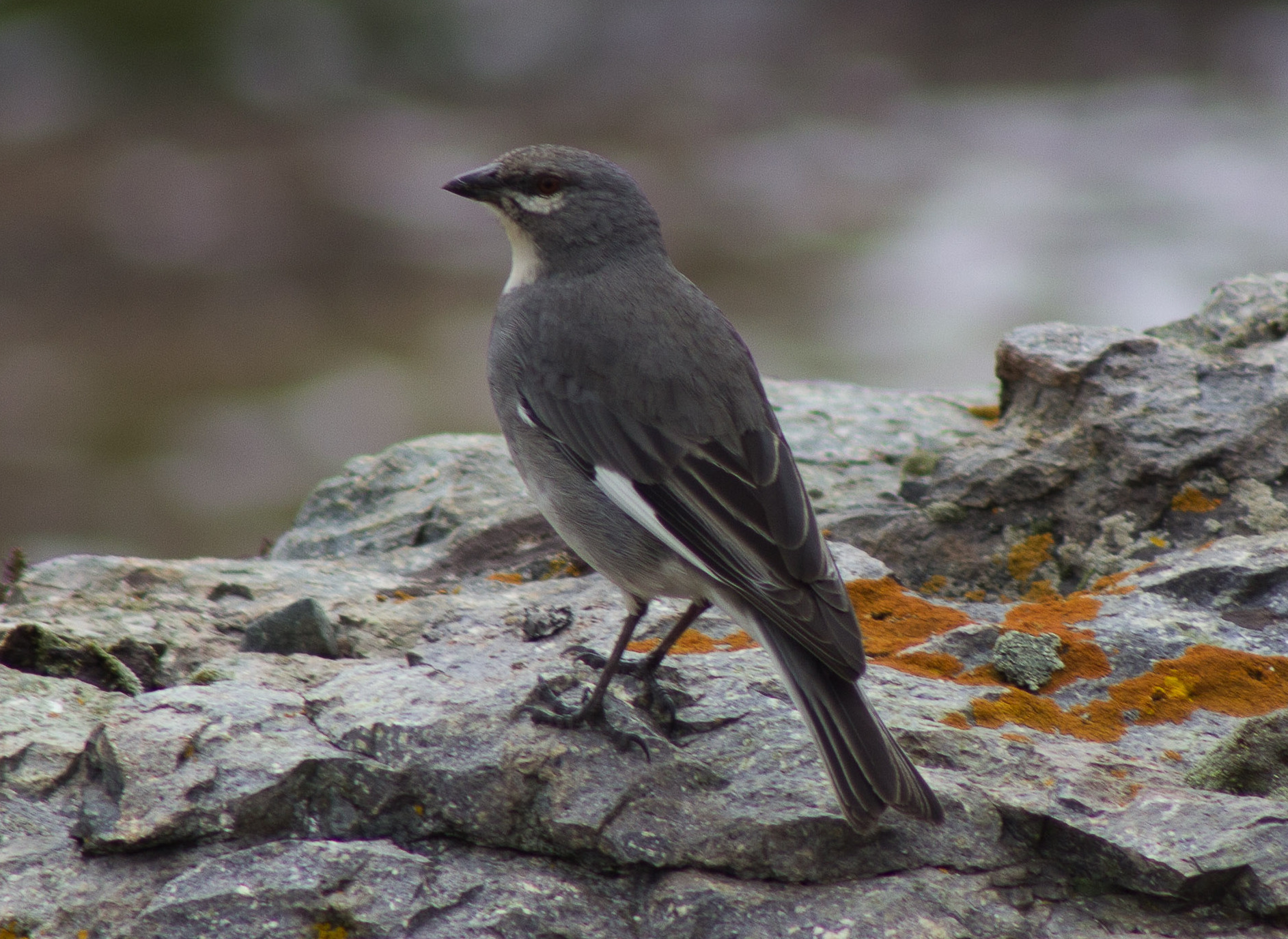
The white-winged diuca finch nests on Quelccaya.

The terrain west of Quelccaya is sparsely vegetated with high elevation tundra vegetation. The vegetation in the region is known as puna grassland; above 4,300 metres (14,100 ft) elevation it is defined as "super-Puna", and consists of herbs and shrubs such as Plantago and trees like Polylepis which grow to the ice cap and often have a krummholz appearance. The main human use of the area is livestock grazing but crop planting has also been reported.

There are over fifty plant species in the terrain around the ice cap. Aquatic plants are found in lakes. The glacial runoff and precipitation guarantee an ample water supply, leading to the development of wetlands known as bofedales and peat; The cushion plant Distichia muscoides is the dominant plant in the bofedales and these wetlands are hotspots of biodiversity, but tussock grasses have been expanding in the wetlands as ice retreats. Other plants include Festuca orthophylla (a grass), Jarava ichu (Peruvian feathergrass) and nettles. Twenty-three lichen species have been identified growing on rocks at Quelccaya.

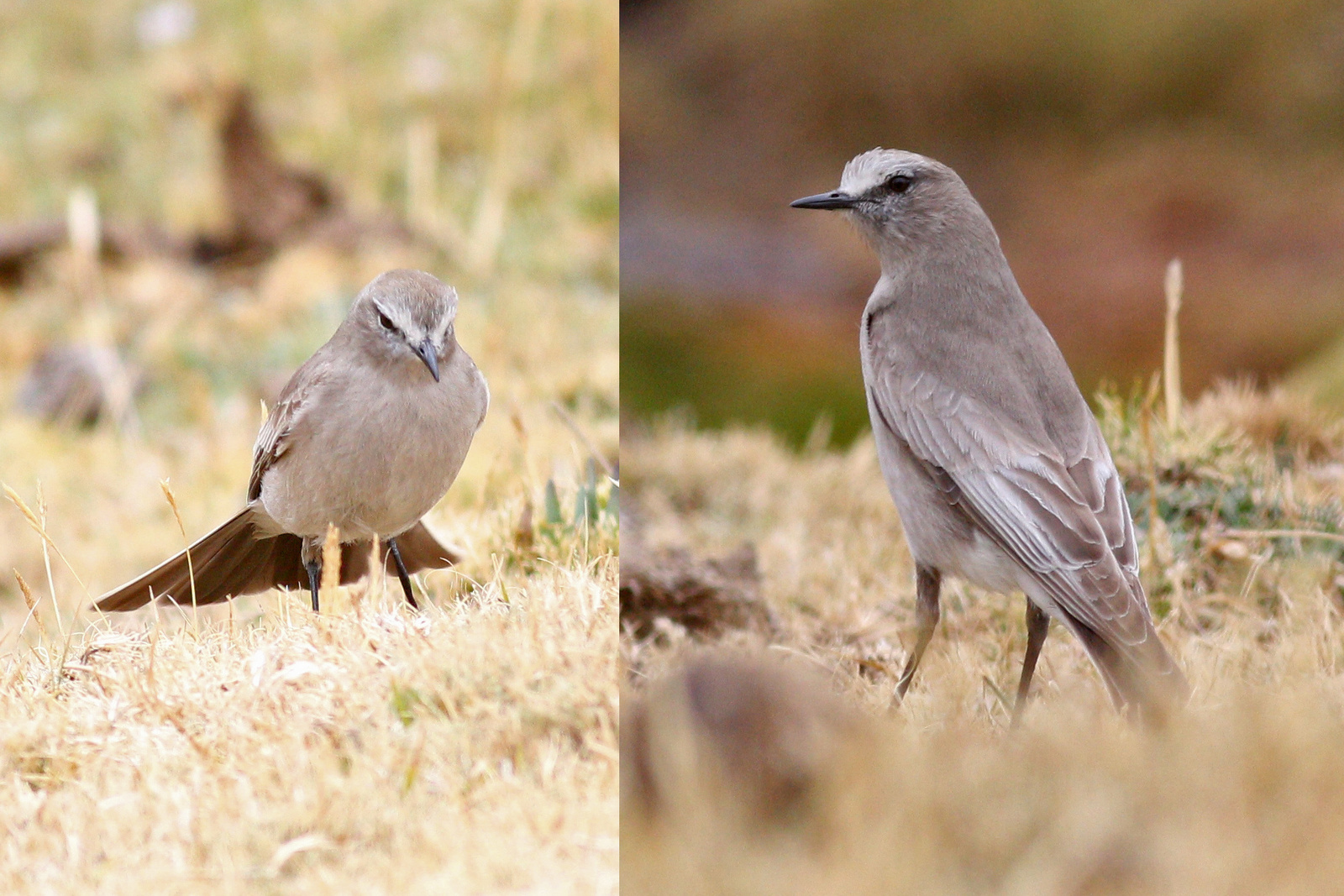
The white-fronted ground tyrant nests on Quelccaya.

Among animals are 60 species of birds, while mammals in the surrounding region include Andean foxes, Andean mountain cats, deer, vicuñas and vizcachas, and amphibians and water fleas occur in lakes. Two birds, the glacier finch and the white-fronted ground tyrant are known to nest on the Quelccaya ice cap, mostly within cavities in the ice that are barely accessible to humans. The finch is known to nest on ice elsewhere in the tropical Andes, and other bird species might also nest on the Quelccaya ice. Other than these finches, only emperor penguins are known to nest on ice; ice is an ill-suited environment for the raising of young birds and Quelccaya presents additional challenges linked to its high elevation. Other birds nest in protected locations in the general Quelccaya area and some species also roost on the ice.

== Scientific research and monitoring ==
Glaciers in the region have been monitored since the 1970s. Sediment cores in lakes and peat, mapping of moraines, radiocarbon and cosmogenic isotope dating have been used to infer past states of the ice cap, and since 1976 Quelccaya is regularly reconnoitered. An automated weather station that records meteorological parameters was installed in 2003 and reinstalled in 2004 after vandalism, and snow is sampled annually although continuous precipitation records do not exist. The American paleoclimatologist Lonnie Thompson and the Ohio State University (OSU) have been monitoring Quelccaya since 1974 and the ice cap has been investigated for its glaciology and for both its past and present climate.

=== Ice cores ===
The layered appearance of the Quelccaya ice cap at its margins suggested to scientists that the ice cap could be used to obtain ice cores with annual resolution. After a summer field program that lasted between 1976 and 1984, in 1983 Thompson and the OSU team obtained two ice cores that were 163.6 metres (537 ft) and 154.8 metres (508 ft) long (Note: Reaching the bedrock) from the central area of the ice cap. The ice cores were drilled with the help of a solar-powered ice drill specifically developed for Quelccaya because other power sources could not be brought onto the ice cap. These ice cores were investigated by the OSU Byrd Polar Research Center. They cover a timespan of 1,500 and 1,350 years, with the longer ice core going back to 470 AD. (Note: Compressed ice as old as 330 BCE may exist at Quelccaya.) Another, shorter ice core measuring 15 metres (49 ft) in length and spanning 8 years was obtained in 1976; others followed in 1979, 1991, 1995 and 2000.

Dust layers deposited during the dry season allow the determination of yearly layers, which characteristically thin downward. Volcanic ash deposited by the 1600 Huaynaputina eruption has been used to date the ice cores; in turn the volume of the eruption was reconstructed from the ash thickness in the ice core.

A number of research findings have been made with the Quelccaya ice cores:

- The ice cores contain annually resolved oxygen isotope ratio variations. During the past millennium, the oxygen isotope ratios recorded at Quelccaya have resembled these found in other tropical South American and also Tibetan ice cores. While originally proposed to reflect temperature variations, the oxygen isotope ratios have also been assumed to reflect atmospheric circulation and temperatures in the Pacific Ocean and tropical North Atlantic.
- Oxygen isotope ratio variations record the Little Ice Age, which clearly stands out in the Quelccaya ice core record. The Quelccaya record was used to infer that the Little Ice Age was a global event, and that temperature and precipitation variations took place during the Little Ice Age. An early wet phase occurred between 1500 and 1720 and a late dry phase between 1720 and 1880. At the ice cap, the Little Ice Age ended relatively suddenly around 1880.
- The oxygen isotope ratios also vary during El Niño years and the ice cores have been employed to make a record of ENSO events. The 1976 and the 1982–1983 El Niño events have been identified in the ice cores.
- A correlation between precipitation on the ice cap with water levels in Lake Titicaca and traces of the severe drought between 1933 and 1945 have been found in the ice core record of Quelccaya.
- Other climate events recorded at Quelccaya are the 1815 eruption of Indonesia's Mount Tambora and the 536 climate downturn.
- Recent ice layers bear record of historic volcanic eruptions, wildfires in the Amazon and mining activities in Peru.
- Additional findings in the ice cores are dust clouds generated by earthquakes in the dry Atacama and Pacific coast of Peru, dust correlated to droughts, traces of the Suess cycle which is a solar cycle, evidence of Inka and Spanish industrial activity in South America, and finally of agriculture around Lake Titicaca.

The Quelccaya ice cores are widely used to reconstruct past climate states. Quelccaya was the first ice cap outside of the polar regions from which old ice cores were obtained, and is the site of the first annually resolved ice core record from the tropical Andes; it demonstrated the usefulness of tropical ice for ice core studies and the taking of these cores has been called a "major step" in the sampling of high elevation ice in the world. Quelccaya was selected as a site for extra-polar ice core research as it is located in the sparsely investigated tropics and lies at a higher elevation than Puncak Jaya in Indonesia or the Rwenzori Mountains in Africa; thus the ice is less disturbed by percolating meltwater. Because of the lack of seasonal temperature variations and of synoptic weather patterns, tropical glaciers may primarily record secular climate change. The dome-like shape and the low elevation range of the Quelccaya Ice Cap result in large responses of ice extent to relatively small changes in the equilibrium line altitude. (Note: The equilibrium line altitude is the elevation on an ice body where the annual ice accumulation and ice loss balance each other.)

== Natural history ==
Moraines deposited by older glaciers indicate that during the Pleistocene and Holocene glaciers extended over larger surfaces, covering the area with sandy drift derived from ignimbrites. The ice extended over the outwash- and till-covered plain west of Quelccaya and connected with the Cordillera Vilcanota ice cap. During the maximum extent the ice reached down to elevations of 4,500 metres (14,800 ft) as the equilibrium line altitude decreased by 360 metres (1,180 ft); this change in the equilibrium line altitude is considerably less than the decrease found elsewhere in the Peruvian Andes and may reflect topographical controls on glacier expansion. The connection with the Vilcanota ice cap may have occurred during the Last Glacial Maximum and produced a large trapezoidal ice cap covering both Quelccaya, the Vilcanota and the terrain to their west and south.

No direct evidence of glacier expansions in times preceding marine isotope stage 4 remain although an early glaciation of Quelccaya had ice advance to twice the distance it assumed during the Wisconsin glaciation. Maximum extent occurred either about 20,000 years ago or between 28,000 and 14,000 years ago. (Note: Different sources give different ages.) The maximum extent occurred during the Weichselian/Wisconsin glaciation and within marine isotope stage 2.

By 13,600–12,800 years ago Quelccaya had retreated concomitant with global glacier shrinkage at the end of the last glacial maximum. A readvance occurred 12,500 years ago, linked to a colder and wetter climate during the Younger Dryas. Retreat recommenced 12,400 years ago and by 11,800–11,600 years ago the ice cap had reached an extent like during the Little Ice Age and modern times. Another proposed chronology indicates a glacier expansion beginning 13,300 years ago and ending by 12,900 years ago, with Quelccaya reaching a size not much larger than during the Holocene by 12,800 years ago. A final scenario envisages an advance between 12,700 and 11,000 years ago. There might have been two readvances, one in the early Younger Dryas and the other around 12,600 years ago. A halt in retreat or an actual advance of Quelccaya may or may not have occurred at the same time as the former Lake Tauca existed on the Altiplano, (Note: Approximately 17,500–15,000 years ago.) and it is possible that the retreat occurred during the middle Younger Dryas.

=== Holocene ===
During the Holocene, Quelccaya did not expand farther than 1 kilometre (0.62 mi) from its present position and early Holocene moraines have not been found. It is possible that during the mid-Holocene Quelccaya was ice-free altogether; peat deposits and ice cores indicate that it was reduced or even absent then. Until either 7,000 years ago or between at least 7,000 years ago and about 5,000 years ago, plants grew at its margins, including cushion mire vegetation judging by exposed remains. This shrinkage may relate to a warmer and drier climate at that time.

The ice cap began to grow again at a time of global climate change, 5,000 years ago, which included the drying of the Sahara at the end of the African humid period and wetter and colder conditions in the extratropics. This re-expansion was part of the global neoglacial glacier expansion; this pattern of a larger ice cap during the late Holocene than the early is similar to that of Northern Hemisphere glaciers and may reflect Northern Hemisphere insolation. A similar history of early Holocene shrinkage followed by late Holocene expansion has been noted at the Rwenzori Mountains in Africa. The ice cap reached its Holocene maximum extent during the Little Ice Age.

About 4,000 years ago, a new retreat occurred under the influence of warmer and drier climates, and another shrinkage also occurred between 3,000 and 1,500 years ago. Alternatively, 3,400 and 1,500 years before present the ice cap may have extended 1 kilometre (0.62 mi) past its current limit, and about 0.8 kilometres (0.50 mi) past its limit 1,600 years ago.

=== Chronology at Huancané and Qori Kalis ===
Multiple moraines have been dated in the Huancané valley. Three separate glacial stages have been identified here: H1 (the shortest), H2 and H3 (the longest). They have left moraines 8 kilometres (5.0 mi), 4 kilometres (2.5 mi) and 1 kilometre (0.62 mi) from the 2002 ice margin and are also known as Huancane I, Huancane II and Huancane III, names which are sometimes applied to the glacial advances themselves. The moraines in the valley are terminal moraines and consist of sets of ridges up to 1 kilometre (0.62 mi) wide. Boulders found on the Huancane III moraines have fresher appearances than these on the other moraines. Huancane III has also been subdivided into Huancane IIIa, IIIb and IIIc and Huancane II into Huancane IIa, IIb and IIc. These are all regressional moraines, as by the time of the emplacement of Huancane moraines, Quelccaya was shrinking and was already disconnected from the ice on the Cordillera Vilcanota. Finally, there is a set of moraines farther down the Huancané valley that appears to be the oldest. Equivalents of the Huancane moraines have been identified outside of the Huancané valley.

- Huancane III appear to be a last glacial maximum stand or a stand just after the last glacial maximum such as Heinrich event 1 although its age is not well known.
- Huancane II appear to have formed during a post-last glacial maximum advance. One view sees Huancane II as preceding the Younger Dryas and perhaps connected to the Antarctic Cold Reversal; another one assumes that Quelccaya was smaller during the Antarctic Cold Reversal and that Huancane II formed during the Younger Dryas, and a final one that Huancane II was a localized glacier advance.
- Huancane I moraines are less than 1,000 years old and reflect the Little Ice Age extent of the Quelccaya ice cap which at Quelccaya occurred between about 1490 and 1880. They also record expansions that occurred 1,000, 600, 400 and 200 years ago. Huancane I moraines are found all around Quelccaya, and noticeable Little Ice Age moraines are also found in front of the outlet glaciers on the southeastern side of Quelccaya.

About 16 late Holocene moraines are also found downstream of Qori Kalis glacier, with the largest advance occurring before 520±60 years ago, followed by a progressive retreat and a readvance about 350–300 years ago. Similar glacier advance and retreat patterns have been observed in the Cordillera Blanca and Cordillera Vilcabamba in Peru, the Bolivian Andes and also in Patagonia and New Zealand and appear to reflect cold climate oscillations.

=== Implications ===
Estimating the ages of moraines is difficult. A retreating glacier will deposit successive moraines but an advancing one can destroy older moraines less extensive than the glacier advance. Dates obtained from organic material behind a moraine may be considerably younger than the moraine as its development occurs with a lag from deglaciation, while organic matter in or underneath a moraine may be considerably older. Changes in sediment fluxes to lakes west of Quelccaya appear to reflect advances and retreats of glaciers, with meltwater formed during retreats increasing sediment fluxes.

The extent of the Quelccaya ice cap does not appear to correlate with the amount of precipitation occurring on the ice cap except in particular cases; temperature effects appear to dominate and warmer and wetter climates have been associated with retreat. This dominance of temperature over precipitation in determining ice cap size and glacier length has been replicated by modelling. Interannual climate variability does not have substantial effects on the extent of the ice cap.

== Present retreat ==
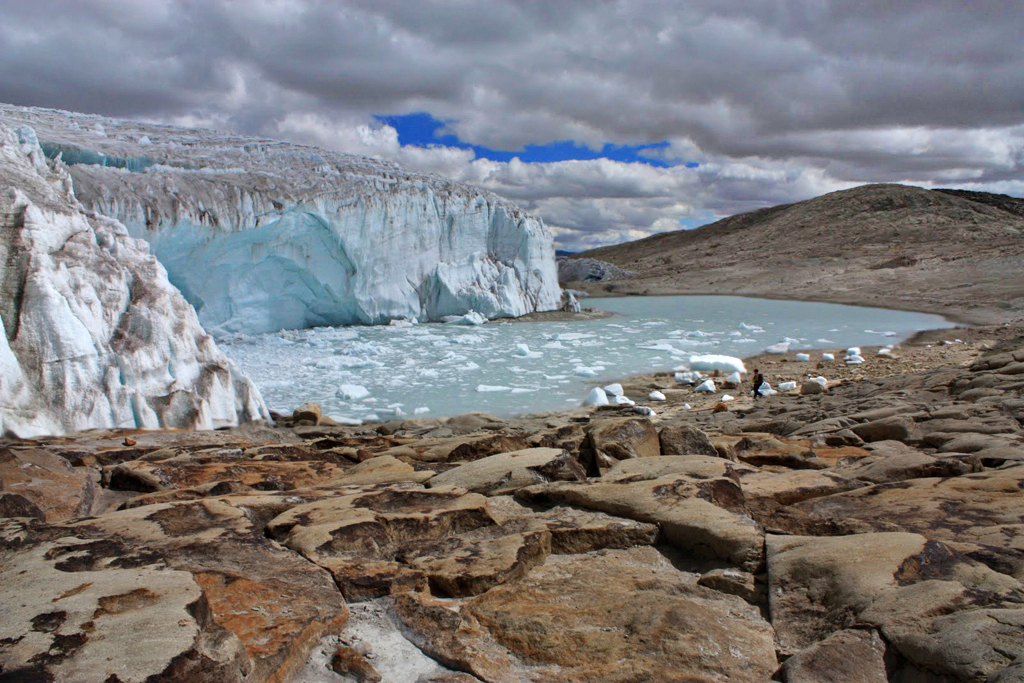
A proglacial lake at Quelccaya

The glaciers are melting at increasing rates, with rapid deglaciation underway during the late 20th century at a rate that is comparable to or exceeds that of postglacial retreat rates. Between 1980 and 2010, the ice cap shrank at a rate of 0.57 ± 0.1 square kilometres per year (0.220 ± 0.039 mi^{2}/a) with a loss of 30% of its area between 1979 and 2014. The ice thinned at a rate of 0.37 metres per year (1.2 ft/a) between 2010 and 2020. Between 1990 and 2009, a southeastern branch of the ice cap disappeared altogether. At the northwestern and southeastern ends of the ice cap, the retreat has reached the plateau that Quelccaya sits on. Additionally, parts of the northwestern ice cap have separated from the main ice body and by 2011 the retreat had reduced Quelccaya to a size smaller than at any other time in the past 6,000 years. The height of the ice surface has increased over time. There is some variation between retreat rates measured by different researchers as the Quelccaya ice cap is differently defined and due to differences between extents measured in seasons with and without snow cover. True fluctuations also occur, such as an advance of part of Quelccaya's southern margin reported in 1977 which bulldozed peat deposits, a pause of the Qori Kalis glacier between 1991 and 1993 probably linked with the global cooling caused by the Philippine Pinatubo eruption in 1991, a slow-down in the mid-2000s and an overall higher rate of retreat since 2000. Some fluctuations have been linked to ENSO variability. The retreat of Qori Kalis is documented photographically by the National Snow and Ice Data Center of the USA.

The Qori Kalis outlet glacier has been observed since 1963, and between 1963 and 1978 retreated by about 6 metres per year (20 ft/a) and between 1991 and 2005 by about 60 metres per year (200 ft/a). The retreat has been accompanied by a volume loss of the ice cap, increasing from 290,000 cubic metres per year (10,000,000 cu ft/a) between 1963 and 1978 over 1,310,000 cubic metres per year (46,000,000 cu ft/a) between 1978 and 1983 to 2,200,000 cubic metres per year (78,000,000 cu ft/a) between 1983 and 1991. The rate of retreat is higher than at the end of the last ice age and the glacier responds quickly to climate alterations.

Similar retreats have been observed at other tropical glaciers, and are linked to the increase in global temperatures caused by industrial greenhouse gas emissions. This warming is unprecedented by the standards of the late Holocene.

=== Consequences ===
Meltwater lakes and proglacial lakes have formed in front of Qori Kalis glacier and other Quelccaya glaciers and expanded in size. These lakes could be sources of future glacial lake outburst floods, although the sparse population of the area means that potential damages caused by these floods would be lessened. Two such floods occurred in March 2006 and December 2007, caused property damage and killed livestock. In addition, some lakes have drained and the course of streams has changed as the glaciers have retreated.

The freezing level regularly rises above the summit of Quelccaya, and in recent ice cores, meltwater infiltration has become apparent. Consequently, oxygen isotope ratios are no longer preserved in the ice; while this infiltration has smoothened the record only to a certain depth and particle-based records are unaffected, it illustrates the threat that climate change is creating for the existence of climate archives in ice cores. Alpine life is quickly advancing into the terrain left by ice, and the retreat has exposed plant remains that had been overrun during a glacier expansion that occurred 5,000 years ago.

=== Projections ===
Projected climate change is expected to involve a further 3–5 °C (5.4–9.0 °F) warming in the central Andes, with higher warming occurring at higher elevations. Owing to the low altitude range spanned by Quelccaya, it is highly vulnerable to future warming. Extrapolations of the current retreat and modelling even with drastic climate change mitigation measures, indicate that during the 21st century the equilibrium line altitude will rise above the top of the ice cap and thus the entire cap will become a zone of net ice loss and Quelccaya will disappear. There is some uncertainty owing to, for example, changes in precipitation, including any potential future decrease.

== Hydrology and significance ==
Glacial meltwater is an important source of water especially in dry years and during the dry season, including in the Altiplano and in the hyperarid coasts of Peru. For example, about 80% of Peru's hydropower sources are buffered by glacial meltwater. Avalanches and floods from glaciers have killed over 35,000 people and glacial retreat will likely increase their incidence. Enhanced melting may be contributing to streamflow, and past meltwater flows might have contributed to the formation of large lakes in the Altiplano.

Most of Quelccaya borders on the Inambari River watershed, especially on the east and south; the western parts of the ice cap border on the Vilcanota River/Urubamba River catchment (Note: Sometimes it is also stated that Lake Titicaca receives water from Quelccaya but watershed maps show Quelccaya bordering on the Inambari River and Vilcanota River watershed, both of which drain to the Atlantic Ocean.) of which it is an important part. Clockwise from the northwest the Rio Chimboya, the Quebrada Jatun Cucho/Jetun Cucho, the Quebrada Queoñani, Quebrada Sairi-Saire Mayu-Quelcaya Mayu/Querani Mayu, the Rio Huancané, the Rio Ritiananta and the Quebrada Accoaysana Pampa emanate from the ice cap. The first four rivers eventually converge into the westward flowing Rio Corani, a tributary of the northward-flowing Rio Ollachea/Rio Sangabán which eventually ends into the Inambari River; the last four rivers eventually converge into the southwards-flowing Rio Phinaya/Salcca, which then turns west and ends into the Vilcanota River. Some of the valleys that drain southeastward, northeastward and west-northwestward from Quelccaya can be affected by glacier-related floods.

Quelccaya is the largest glacierized area in the watershed of the San Gabán hydropower plant and also of the catchment Rio Vilcanota watershed; its water is used by the Cusco Region. The water is used for both irrigation and hydropower production. The population in the region is for the most part rural with low socioeconomic status, and as such is highly vulnerable to the effects of climate change. Additionally, glaciers have important religious and social value for the local communities.

== See also ==
- List of glaciers
- Water supply and sanitation in Peru
