= Allincapac =

Mountain in Peru

Highest point
- Elevation: 5,805 m (19,045 ft)
- Coordinates: 13°54′29″S 70°24′56″W

Geography
- Location within Peru
- Location: Peru, Puno Region
- Parent range: Andes, Carabaya

Allincapac, Allin Ccapac or Allin Japac (possibly from Quechua: allin good, qhapaq the mighty one) is a mountain in the Andes of Peru. It is the highest peak of the Carabaya mountain range, rising up to 5,805 metres (19,045 ft). Allincapac is located in the Puno Region, Carabaya Province, Macusani District, south of Huaynaccapac, northeast of Chichicapac and north of Lake Chaupicocha.
