= Inambari River =

Coordinates: 12°43′S 69°44′W

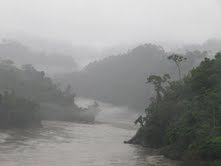

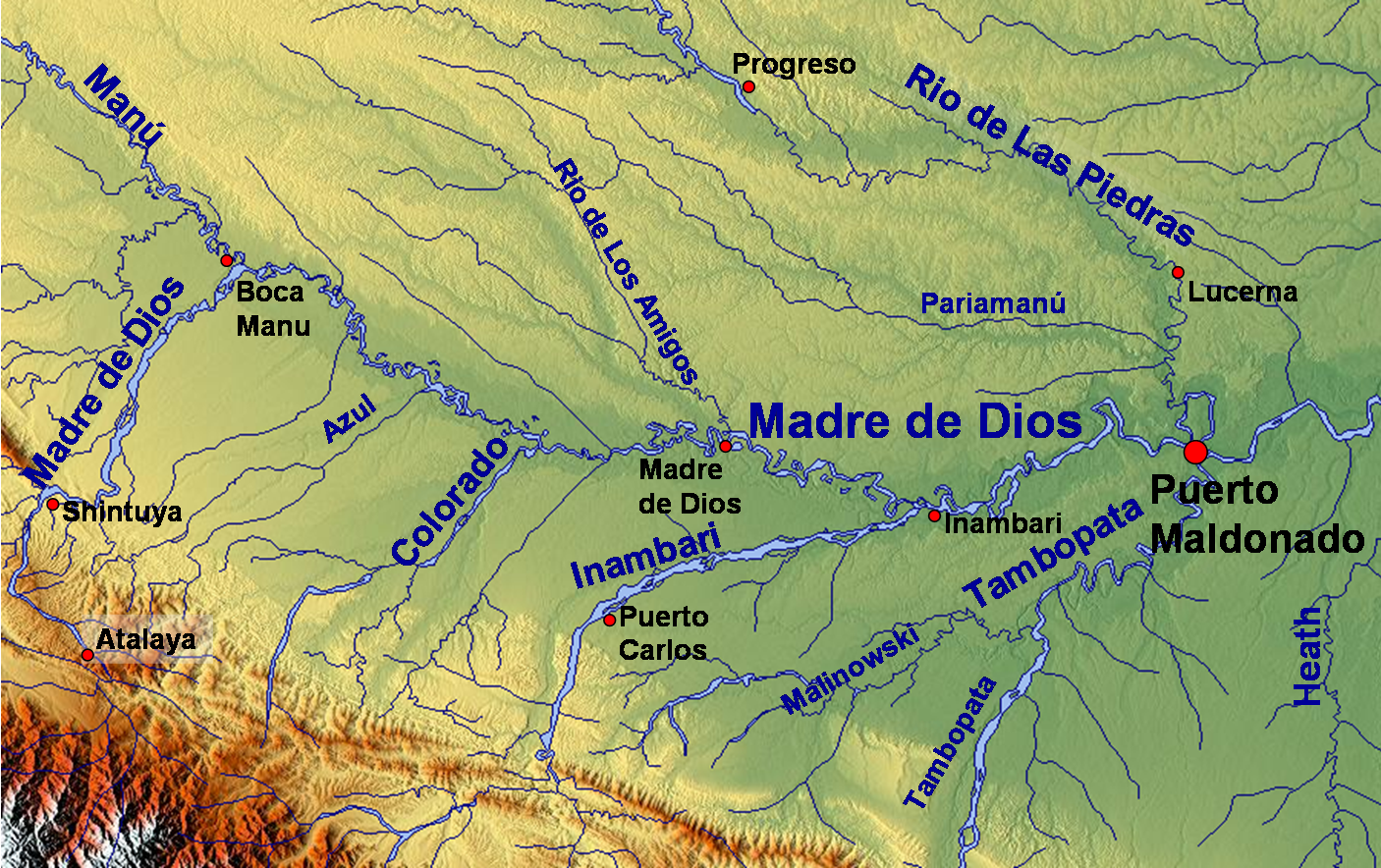
- The Madre de Dios watershed, including the lower Inambari

Location
- Country: Peru

Physical characteristics
- Source: Andes
- Mouth: Madre de Dios River
- Length: 390 km (240 mi)

The Inambari River in southeastern Peru flows 210 miles (340 km) from the Cordillera Apolobamba in the Andes to the Madre de Dios River. The river spans the Puno and Madre de Dios regions.

Tributaries of the Inambari include the rivers Yanaqucha, Pukaramayu, Mancuari, Wila Uma, Blanco, San Bartolome, Yawarmayu and Winchusmayu. The Inambari passes through the towns of Cuyocuyo, Sandia and Massiapo, Pacaysuizo, Isilluma and St. Helena.
