= Macho Ritti =

Mountain in Peru

- Location within Peru

Highest point
- Elevation: 5,200 m (17,100 ft)
- Coordinates: 13°47′40″S 70°37′14″W

Geography
- Location: Peru, Puno Region
- Parent range: Andes, Vilcanota

Macho Ritti (possibly from Quechua machu old, old person, rit'i snow, "old snow (mountain)") is a mountain in the Vilcanota mountain range in the Andes of Peru, about 5,200 metres (17,060 ft) high. It is located in the Puno Region, Carabaya Province, on the border of the districts Corani and Ollachea. Macho Ritti lies north-west of the lakes Mancacocha and Jomercocha and north of the mountain Ananta.
