= Llusca Ritti (Cusco-Puno) =

Mountain in Peru near Cusco

- Aya Chinkana
- Location within Peru

Highest point
- Elevation: 5,200 m (17,100 ft)
- Coordinates: 13°43′31″S 70°43′55″W

Geography
- Location: Peru, Cusco Region, Puno Region
- Parent range: Andes, Vilcanota

Llusca Ritti (possibly from Quechua llusk'a polished; slippery, rit'i snow, "polished snow" or "slippery snow") or Ayachincana (possibly from Quechua aya corpse, chinkana labyrinth, "corpse labyrinth") is a mountain in the Vilcanota mountain range in the Andes of Peru, approximately 5,200 metres (17,060 ft) high. It is located in the Cusco Region, Quispicanchi Province, Marcapata District, and in the Puno Region, Carabaya Province, Ollachea District. Llusca Ritti lies south of Sullulluni and northwest of Jori Pintay.
