= Cordillera Carabaya =

Mountains in Peru

Carabaya mountain range
- Allincapac

Highest point
- Peak: Allin Capac
- Elevation: 5,780 m (18,960 ft)

Dimensions
- Length: 75 km (47 mi) N-S

Geography
- Country: Peru
- Region: Puno
- Range coordinates: 13°54′32″S 70°24′33″W
- Parent range: Andes

The Cordillera Carabaya (Spanish for "Carabaya mountain range") lies in the Andes of Peru. It extends between 14°00' and 14°22'S and 69°38' and 70°19'W for about 75 km. It is located in the Puno Region, Carabaya Province, between the Vilcanota mountain range in the north-west and the Apolobamba mountain range in the south-east, north and north-east of Macusani.

== Mountains ==
The highest peak in the range is Allincapac at 5,805 metres (19,045 ft). Other mountains are listed below:

- Huaynaccapac, 5,721 metres (18,770 ft)
- Tococcapac, 5,670 metres (18,602 ft)
- Chichicapac, 5,614 metres (18,419 ft)
- Juraccapac, 5,610 metres (18,406 ft)
- Cacaccapac, 5,425 metres (17,799 ft)
- Balansani, 5,350 metres (17,552 ft)
- Vela Cunca, 5,350 metres (17,552 ft)
- Quenamari, 5,294 metres (17,369 ft)
- Queroni, 5,250 metres (17,224 ft)
- Muro Muruni, 5,200 metres (17,060 ft)
- Pumajolluni, 5,200 metres (17,060 ft)
- Quellhuacotarriti, 5,200 metres (17,060 ft)
- Vilajota, 5,198 metres (17,054 ft)
- Allpajata, 5,100 metres (16,732 ft)
- Jatun Pinguilluni, 5,100 metres (16,732 ft)
- Tocsajota, 5,100 metres (16,732 ft)
- Challhuani, 5,000 metres (16,404 ft)
- Chullumpirini, 5,000 metres (16,404 ft)
- Minas Cunca, 5,000 metres (16,404 ft)
- Q'umirqucha Punta, 5,000 metres (16,404 ft)
- Tucuhuachana, 5,000 metres (16,404 ft)
- Q'uli Kunka, 4,800 metres (15,748 ft)
- Sallikani, 4,800 metres (15,748 ft)
- Usqulluni, 4,800 metres (15,748 ft)
- Wisk'achani, 4,800 metres (15,748 ft)

== See also ==
- Chaupicocha
- Kallawaya
