= Jori Pintay =

Mountain in Peru

- Location within Peru

Highest point
- Elevation: 5,200 m (17,100 ft)
- Coordinates: 13°43′53″S 70°43′19″W

Geography
- Location: Peru, Puno Region
- Parent range: Andes, Vilcanota

Jori Pintay (possibly from Quechua quri gold, pintay to paint / painting (a borrowing from Spanish pintar to paint)) is a mountain in the Vilcanota mountain range in the Andes of Peru, about 5,200 metres (17,060 ft) high. It is located in the Puno Region, Carabaya Province, in the districts Corani and Ollachea. Jori Pintay lies southeast of the mountains Sullulluni and Llusca Ritti, and northeast of the mountain Quello Cunca.
