= Retreat of glaciers since 1850 =

Recent shrinking of glaciers due to global warming

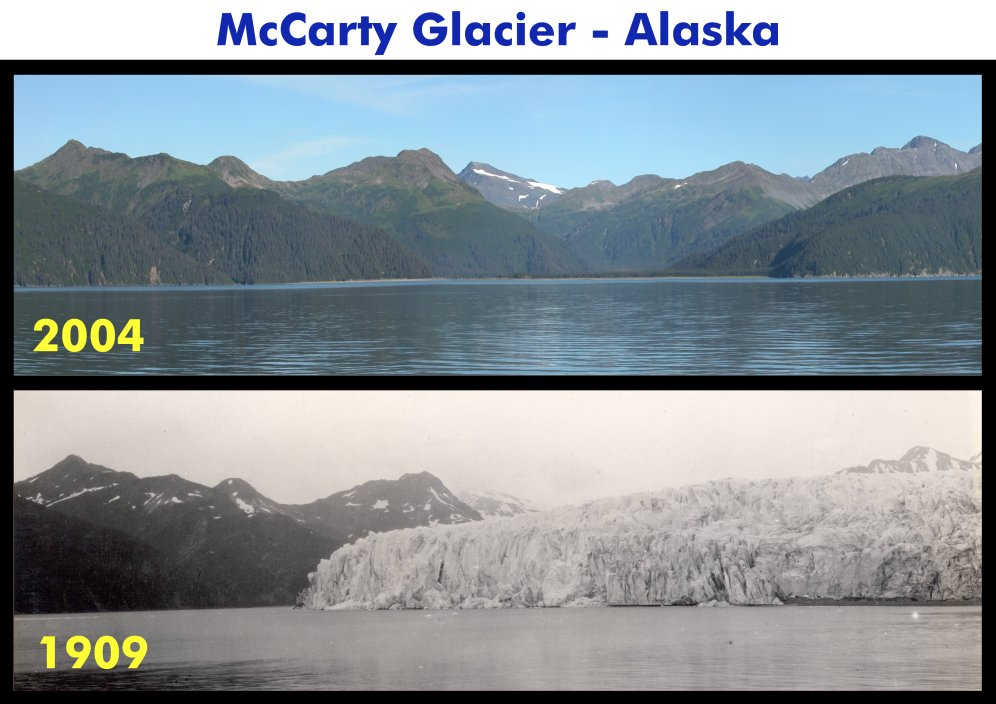
Alaska's McCarty Glacier retreated about 15 kilometres (9.3 mi) in less than a century, and dense, diverse vegetation has become established on the slopes.

The retreat of glaciers since 1850 is a well-documented effect of climate change. The retreat of mountain glaciers provides evidence for the rise in global temperatures since the late 19th century. Examples include mountain glaciers in western North America, Asia, the Alps in central Europe, and tropical and subtropical regions of South America and Africa. Since glacial mass is affected by long-term climatic changes, e.g. precipitation, mean temperature, and cloud cover, glacial mass changes are one of the most sensitive indicators of climate change. The retreat of glaciers is also a major reason for sea level rise. Excluding peripheral glaciers of ice sheets, the total cumulated global glacial losses over the 26 years from 1993 to 2018 were likely 5500 gigatons, or 210 gigatons per year.

On Earth, 99% of glacial ice is contained within vast ice sheets (also known as "continental glaciers") in the polar regions. Glaciers also exist in mountain ranges on every continent other than the Australian mainland, including Oceania's high-latitude oceanic island countries such as New Zealand. Glacial bodies larger than 50,000 km^{2} (19,000 sq mi) are called ice sheets. They are several kilometers deep and obscure the underlying topography.

Deglaciation occurs naturally at the end of ice ages. But the current glacier retreat is accelerated by global warming due to human-caused greenhouse gas emissions. Human activities since the start of the industrial era have increased the concentration of carbon dioxide and other heat-trapping greenhouse gases in the air, causing current global warming. Human influence is the principal driver of changes to the cryosphere, of which glaciers are a part.

The glacier mass balance is the key determinant of the health of a glacier. If the amount of frozen precipitation in the accumulation zone exceeds the quantity of glacial ice the ablation zone lost due to melting, a glacier will advance. If the accumulation is less than the ablation, the glacier will retreat. Glaciers in retreat will have negative mass balances. They will eventually disappear if they do not reach an equilibrium between accumulation and ablation.

Mid-latitude mountain ranges show some of the largest proportionate glacial losses. Examples of such mountain ranges are the Himalayas in Asia, the Rocky Mountains and the Cascade Range in North America, the Alps in Europe, the Southern Alps in New Zealand, the southern Andes in South America, as well as isolated tropical summits such as Mount Kilimanjaro in Africa.

Glacial ice is the largest reservoir of fresh water on Earth, holding with ice sheets about 69 percent of the world's freshwater. The retreat of glaciers has near term impacts on the availability of fresh water for drinking water and irrigation. For example, in the Andes and Himalayas the demise of glaciers will affect water supplies for people in that region. Melting glaciers also leads to sea level rise.

== Scale at the global level ==
Melting of mountain glaciers from 1994 to 2017 (6.1 trillion tonnes) constituted about 22% of Earth's ice loss during that period.

Globally in recent decades, the mass of glaciers has persistently declined, with the rate of annual loss accelerating.

The Little Ice Age was a period from about 1550 to 1850 when certain regions experienced relatively cooler temperatures compared to the time before and after. Subsequently, until about 1940, glaciers around the world retreated as the climate warmed substantially. Glacial retreat slowed and even reversed temporarily, in many cases, between 1950 and 1980 as global temperatures cooled slightly.

Since 1980, climate change has led to glacier retreat becoming increasingly rapid and ubiquitous, so much so that some glaciers have disappeared altogether, and the existence of many of the remaining glaciers is threatened. Excluding peripheral glaciers of ice sheets, the total cumulated global glacial losses over the 26 years from 1993 to 2018 were likely 5500 gigatons, or 210 gigatons per yr.

== Causes ==
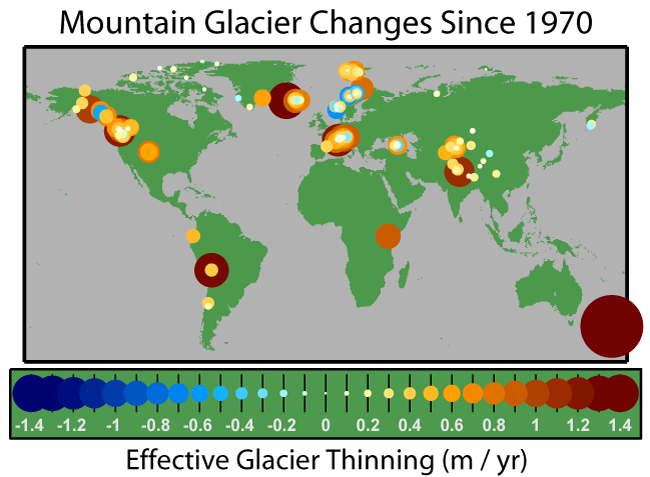
From 1970 to 2004, mountain glaciers thinned (yellow and red) in some regions and thickened (blue) in others.

Seasonal melt contributes to runoff; the annual balance (net change of glacier mass such as in "reference glaciers") contributes to sea level rise.

Projections: Melting of glacial mass is approximately linearly related to temperature increase. Based on current pledges, global mean temperature is projected to increase by +2.7 °C, which would cause loss of about half of Earth's glaciers by 2100 with a sea level rise of 115±40 millimeters.

The mass balance, or difference between accumulation and ablation (melting and sublimation), of a glacier is crucial to its survival. Climate change may cause variations in both temperature and snowfall, resulting in changes in mass balance. A glacier with a sustained negative balance loses equilibrium and retreats. A sustained positive balance is also out of equilibrium and will advance to reestablish equilibrium. Currently, nearly all glaciers have a negative mass balance and are retreating.

Glacier retreat results in the loss of the low-elevation region of the glacier. Since higher elevations are cooler, the disappearance of the lowest portion decreases overall ablation, thereby increasing mass balance and potentially reestablishing equilibrium. If the mass balance of a significant portion of the accumulation zone of the glacier is negative, it is in disequilibrium with the climate and will melt away without a colder climate and/or an increase in frozen precipitation.

For example, Easton Glacier in Washington state, U.S. will likely shrink to half its size but at a slowing rate of reduction and stabilize at that size despite the warmer temperature over a few decades. However, the Grinnell Glacier in Montana, U.S. will shrink at an increasing rate until it disappears. The difference is that the upper section of Easton Glacier remains healthy and snow-covered, while even the upper section of the Grinnell Glacier is bare, is melting and has thinned. Small glaciers with minimal altitude range are most likely to fall into disequilibrium with the climate.

== Measurement techniques ==
Methods for measuring retreat include staking terminus location, global positioning mapping, aerial mapping and laser altimetry. The key symptom of disequilibrium is thinning along the entire length of the glacier. This indicates a diminishment of the accumulation zone. The result is marginal recession of the accumulation zone margin, not just of the terminus. In effect, the glacier no longer has a consistent accumulation zone and without an accumulation zone cannot survive. On Mount Stanley, an expedition team sent out by Project Pressure created the first ever 3D model of the glacier using drone photography and GNSS technology showing a surface area decline of 29.5% between 2020 and 2024.

== Impacts ==
=== Sea level rise ===
Water runoff from melting glaciers causes global sea level to rise, a phenomenon the IPCC terms a "slow onset" event.

The potential for major sea level rise depends mostly on a significant melting of the polar ice caps of Greenland and Antarctica, as this is where the vast majority of glacial ice is located. If all the ice on the polar ice caps were to melt away, the oceans of the world would rise an estimated 70 m (230 ft). Although previously it was thought that the polar ice caps were not contributing heavily to sea level rise (IPCC 2007), recent studies have confirmed that both Antarctica and Greenland are contributing 0.5 millimetres (0.020 in) a year each to global sea level rise. The Thwaites Glacier alone, in Western Antarctica is "currently responsible for approximately 4 percent of global sea level rise. It holds enough ice to raise the world ocean a little over 2 feet (65 centimeters) and backstops neighboring glaciers that would raise sea levels an additional 8 feet (2.4 meters) if all the ice were lost." The fact that the IPCC estimates did not include rapid ice sheet decay into their sea level predictions makes it difficult to ascertain a plausible estimate for sea level rise but a 2008 study found that the minimum sea level rise will be around 0.8 metres (2.6 ft) by 2100.

=== Water supply ===
A video describing the impacts of global warming and melting on Everest and the surrounding Himalayas, and the downstream impacts on communities that use that water.

The continued retreat of glaciers will have a number of different quantitative effects. In areas that are heavily dependent on water runoff from glaciers that melt during the warmer summer months, a continuation of the current retreat will eventually deplete the glacial ice and substantially reduce or eliminate runoff. A reduction in runoff will affect the ability to irrigate crops and will reduce summer stream flows necessary to keep dams and reservoirs replenished. This situation is particularly acute for irrigation in South America, where numerous artificial lakes are filled almost exclusively by glacial melt. Central Asian countries have also been historically dependent on the seasonal glacier melt water for irrigation and drinking supplies. In Norway, the Alps, and the Pacific Northwest of North America, glacier runoff is important for hydropower.

In the Himalayas, retreating glaciers could reduce summer water flows by up to two thirds. In the Ganges area, this would cause a water shortage for 500 million people. In the Hindu Kush Himalaya area, around 1.4 billion people are dependent on the five main rivers of the Himalaya mountains. Although the impact will vary from place to place, the amount of meltwater is likely to increase at first as glaciers retreat. Then it will gradually decrease because of the fall in glacier mass.

=== Ecosystems ===
Landscape produced by a receding glacier

Many species of freshwater and saltwater plants and animals are dependent on glacier-fed waters to ensure the cold water habitat to which they have adapted. Some species of freshwater fish need cold water to survive and to reproduce, and this is especially true with salmon and cutthroat trout. Reduced glacial runoff can lead to insufficient stream flow to allow these species to thrive. Alterations to the ocean currents, due to increased freshwater inputs from glacier melt, and the potential alterations to thermohaline circulation of the oceans, may affect existing fisheries upon which humans depend as well.

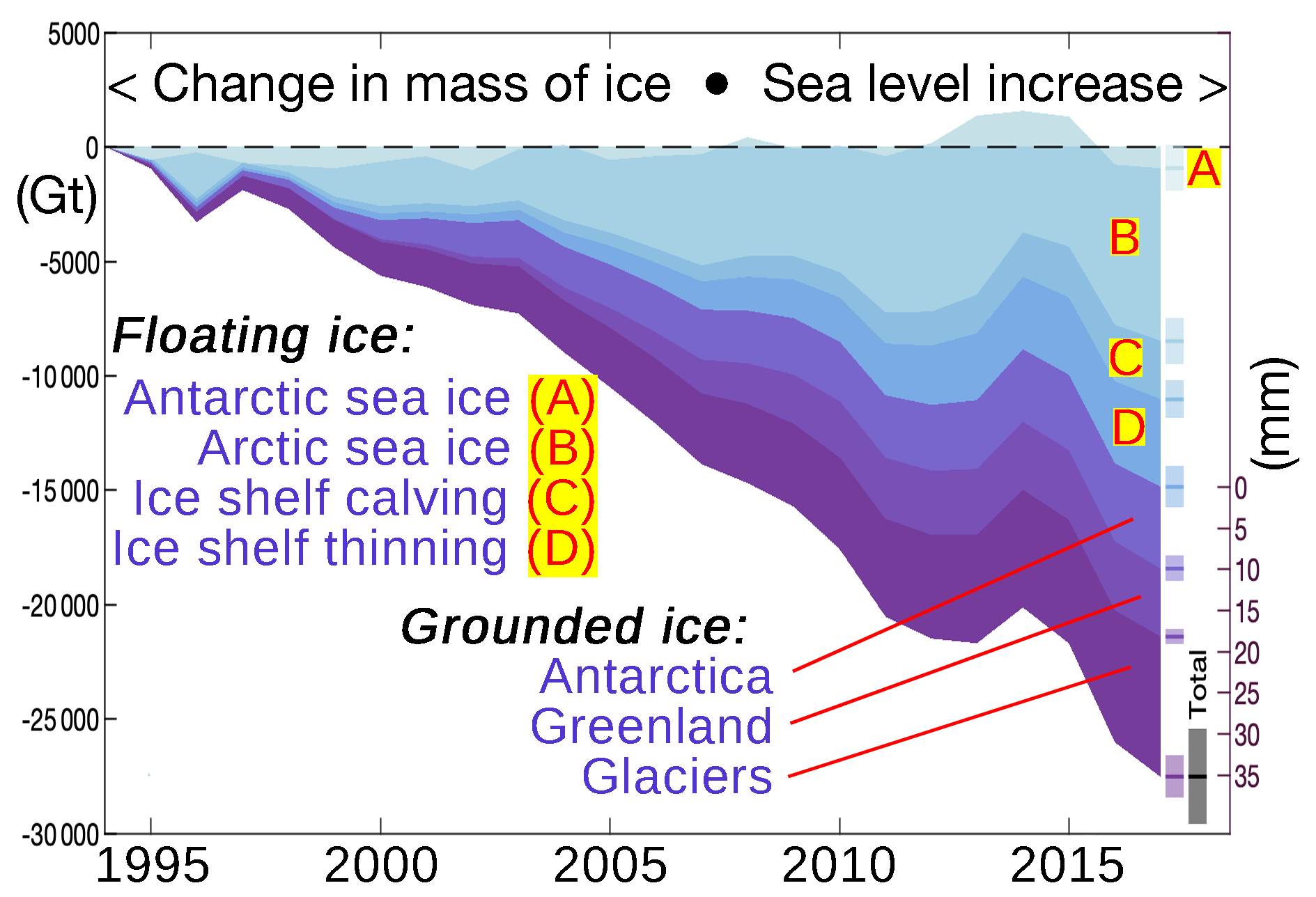
Earth lost 28 trillion tonnes of ice between 1994 and 2017, with melting grounded ice (ice sheets and glaciers) raising the global sea level by 34.6 ±3.1 mm. The rate of ice loss has risen by 57% since the 1990s−from 0.8 to 1.2 trillion tonnes per year.

=== Glacial lake outburst floods ===
One major concern is the increased risk of Glacial Lake Outburst Floods (GLOF), which have in the past had great effect on lives and property. Glacier meltwater left behind by the retreating glacier is often held back by moraines that can be unstable and have been known to collapse if breached or displaced by earthquakes, landslides or avalanches. If the terminal moraine is not strong enough to hold the rising water behind it, it can burst, leading to a massive localized flood. The likelihood of such events is rising due to the creation and expansion of glacial lakes resulting from glacier retreat. Past floods have been deadly and have resulted in enormous property damage. Towns and villages in steep, narrow valleys that are downstream from glacial lakes are at the greatest risk. In 1892 a GLOF released some 200,000 m^{3} (260,000 yd^{3}) of water from the lake of the Tête Rousse Glacier, resulting in the deaths of 200 people in the French town of Saint-Gervais-les-Bains. GLOFs have been known to occur in every region of the world where glaciers are located. Continued glacier retreat is expected to create and expand glacial lakes, increasing the danger of future GLOFs.

== Middle latitude ==
Middle latitude glaciers are located either between the Tropic of Cancer and the Arctic Circle, or between the Tropic of Capricorn and the Antarctic Circle. Both areas support glacier ice from mountain glaciers, valley glaciers and even smaller icecaps, which are usually located in higher mountainous regions. All are located in mountain ranges, notably the Himalayas; the Alps; the Pyrenees; Rocky Mountains; the Caucasus and Pacific Coast Ranges of North America; the Patagonian Andes in South America; and mountain ranges in New Zealand. Glaciers in these latitudes are more widespread and tend to be greater in mass the closer they are to the polar regions. They are the most widely studied over the past 150 years. As with examples located in the tropical zone, virtually all the glaciers in the mid-latitudes are in a state of negative mass balance and are retreating.

=== Northern hemisphere – Eurasia ===
==== Europe ====
All the glaciers in the French alps are retreating. On Mont Blanc, the highest peak in the Alps, the Argentière Glacier has receded 1,150 m (3,770 ft) since 1870. Other Mont Blanc glaciers have also been in retreat, including the Mer de Glace, which is the largest glacier in France at 12 km (7.5 mi) in length but retreated 500 m (1,600 ft) between 1994 and 2008. The Argentière and Mer de Glace glaciers are expected to disappear completely by end of the 21st century if current climate trends persist. The Bossons Glacier once extended from the summit of Mont Blanc at 4,807 m (15,771 ft) to an elevation of 1,050 m (3,440 ft) in 1900. By 2008 Bossons Glacier had retreated to a point that was 1,400 m (4,600 ft) above sea level.

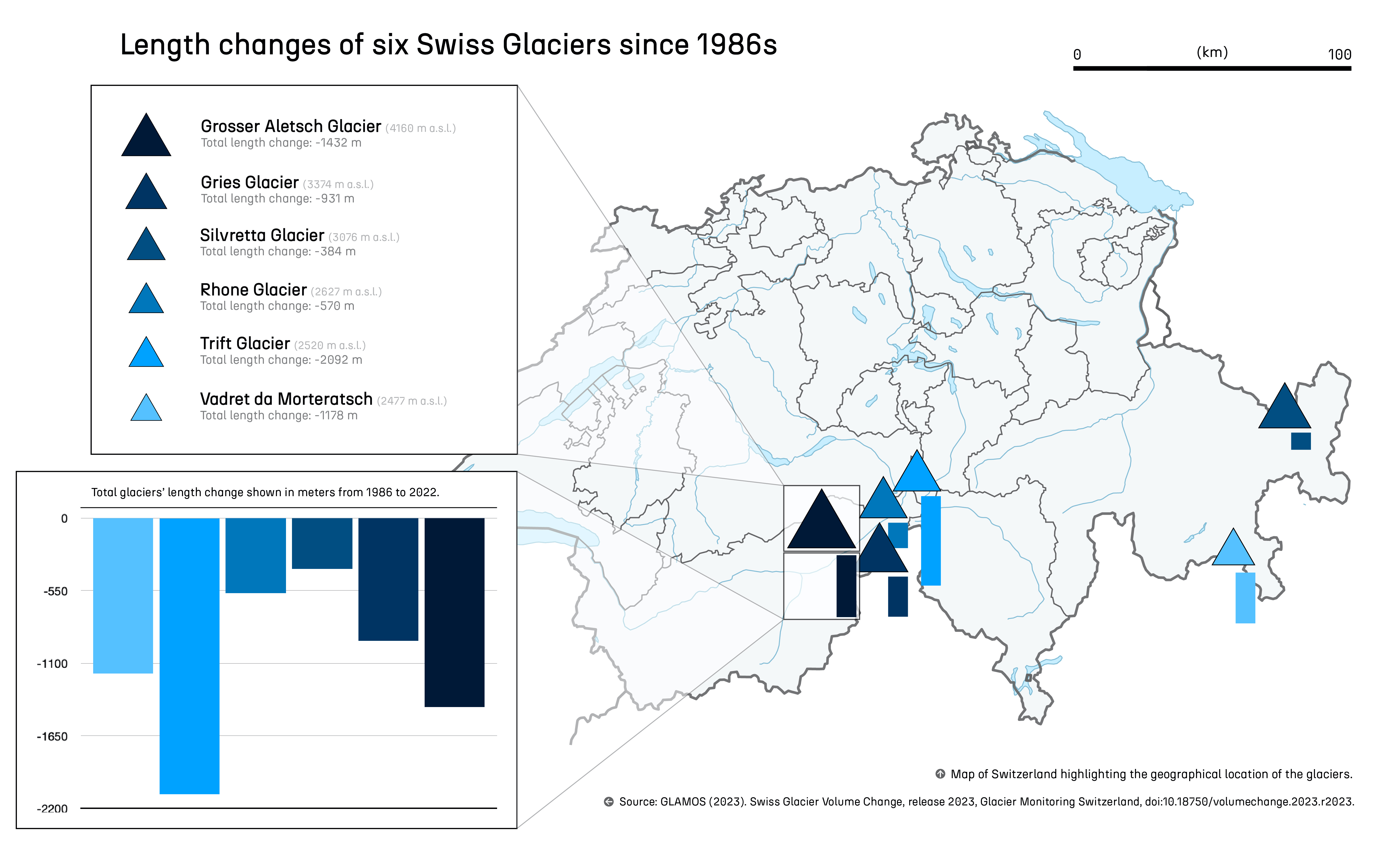
Six Swiss glaciers' length change from 1986 to 2022.

Other researchers have found that glaciers across the Alps appear to be retreating at a faster rate than a few decades ago. In a paper published in 2009 by the University of Zurich, the Swiss glacier survey of 89 glaciers found 76 retreating, 5 stationary and 8 advancing from where they had been in 1973. The Trift Glacier had the greatest recorded retreat, losing 350 m (1,150 ft) of its length between 2003 and 2005. The Grosser Aletsch Glacier is the largest glacier in Switzerland and has been studied since the late 19th century. Aletsch Glacier retreated 2.8 km (1.7 mi) from 1880 to 2009. This rate of retreat has also increased since 1980, with 30%, or 800 m (2,600 ft), of the total retreat occurring in the last 20% of the time period.

The Morteratsch Glacier in Switzerland has had one of the longest periods of scientific study with yearly measurements of the glacier's length commencing in 1878. The overall retreat from 1878 to 1998 has been 2 km (1.2 mi) with a mean annual retreat rate of approximately 17 m (56 ft) per year. This long-term average was markedly surpassed in recent years with the glacier receding 30 m (98 ft) per year during the period between 1999 and 2005. Similarly, of the glaciers in the Italian Alps, only about a third were in retreat in 1980, while by 1999, 89% of these glaciers were retreating. In 2005, the Italian Glacier Commission found that 123 glaciers in Lombardy were retreating. A random study of the Sforzellina Glacier in the Italian Alps indicated that the rate of retreat from 2002 to 2006 was much higher than in the preceding 35 years. To study glaciers located in the alpine regions of Lombardy, researchers compared a series of aerial and ground images taken from the 1950s through the early 21st century and deduced that between 1954–2003 the mostly smaller glaciers found there lost more than half of their area. Repeat photography of glaciers in the Alps indicates that there has been significant retreat since studies commenced.

Research, published in 2019 by ETH Zurich, says that two-thirds of the ice in the glaciers of the Alps is doomed to melt by the end of the century due to climate change. In the most pessimistic scenario, the Alps will be almost completely ice-free by 2100, with only isolated ice patches remaining at high elevation.

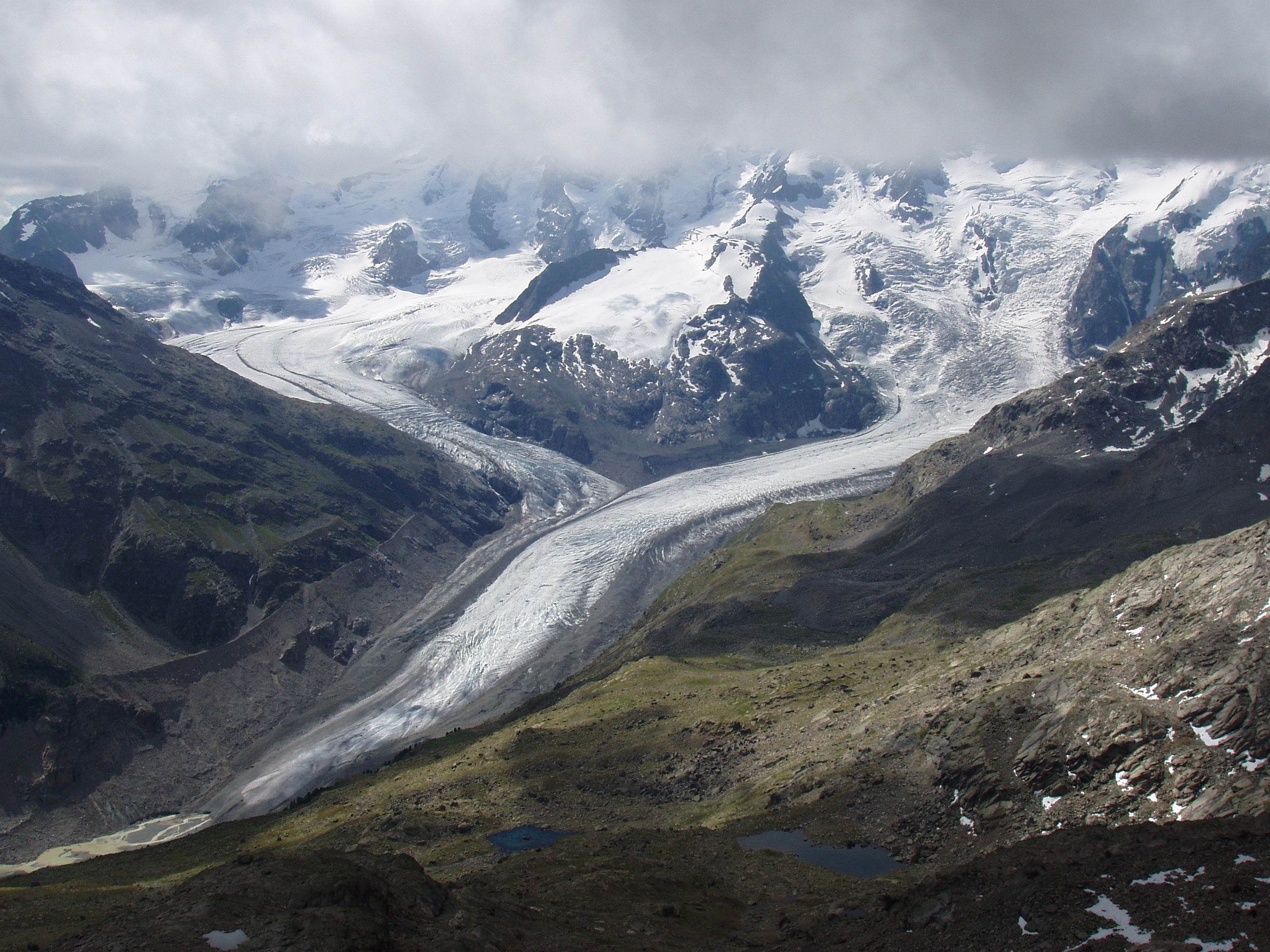
Morteratsch (right) and Pers (left) glaciers in 2005

Though the glaciers of the Alps have received more attention from glaciologists than in other areas of Europe, research indicates that glaciers in northern Europe are also retreating. Since the end of World War II, Storglaciären in Sweden has undergone the longest continuous mass balance study in the world conducted from the Tarfala research station. In the Kebnekaise Mountains of northern Sweden, a study of 16 glaciers between 1990 and 2001 found that 14 glaciers were retreating, one was advancing and one was stable. In Norway, glacier studies have been performed since the early 19th century, with systematic surveys undertaken regularly since the 1990s. Inland glaciers have had a generally negative mass balance, whereas during the 1990s, maritime glaciers showed a positive mass balance and advanced. The maritime advances have been attributed to heavy snowfall in the period 1989–1995. However, reduced snowfall since has caused most Norwegian glaciers to retreat significantly. A survey of 31 Norwegian glaciers in 2010 indicated that 27 were in retreat, one had no change and three advanced. Similarly, in 2013, of 33 Norwegian glaciers surveyed, 26 were retreating, four showed no change and three advanced.

Engabreen Glacier in Norway, an outlet glacier of the Svartisen ice cap, had several advances in the 20th century, though it retreated 200 m (660 ft) between 1999 and 2014. Brenndalsbreen glacier retreated 56 m (184 ft) between 2000 and 2014, while the Rembesdalsskåka glacier, which has retreated 2 km (1.2 mi) since the end of the Little Ice Age, retreated 200 m (660 ft) between 1997 and 2007. The Briksdalsbreen glacier retreated 230 m (750 ft) between 1996 and 2004 with 130 m (430 ft) of that in the last year of that study; the greatest annual retreat recorded on that glacier since studies began there in 1900. This figure was exceeded in 2006 with five glaciers retreating over 100 m (330 ft) from the fall of 2005 to the fall of 2006. Four outlets from the Jostedalsbreen ice cap, the largest body of ice in continental Europe, Kjenndalsbreen, Brenndalsbreen, Briksdalsbreen and Bergsetbreen had a frontal retreat of more than 100 m (330 ft). Overall, from 1999 to 2005, Briksdalsbreen retreated 336 metres (1,102 ft). Gråfjellsbrea, an outlet glacier of the Folgefonna ice cap, had a retreat of almost 100 m (330 ft).

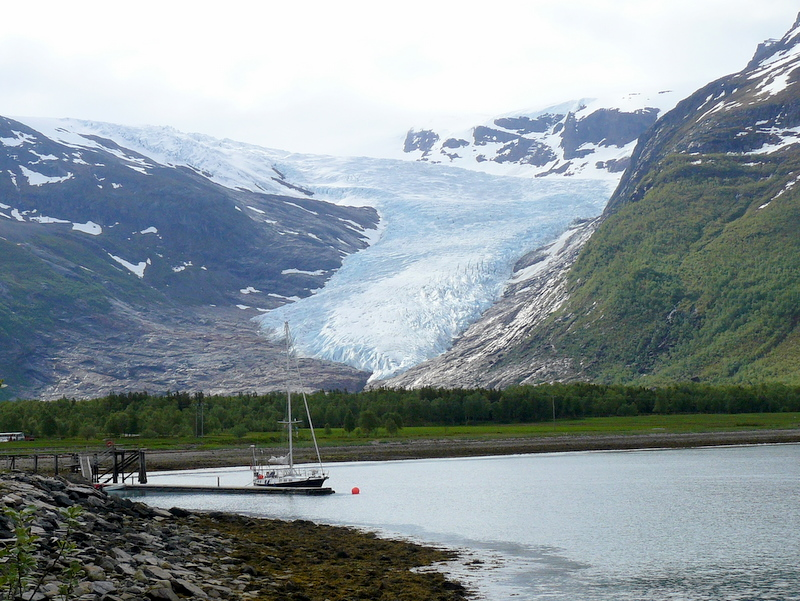
Engabreen Glacier in Norway extended to within 7 m (23 ft) above sea level in 2014, the lowest altitude of any glacier in Europe outside Svalbard. During the 20th century it reached the water.

In the Spanish Pyrenees, recent studies have shown important losses in extent and volume of the glaciers of the Maladeta massif during the period 1981–2005. These include a reduction in area of 35.7%, from 2.41 km^{2} (600 acres) to 1.55 km^{2} (380 acres), a loss in total ice volume of 0.0137 km^{3} (0.0033 mi^{3}) and an increase in the mean altitude of the glacial termini of 43.5 m (143 ft). For the Pyrenees as a whole 50–60% of the glaciated area has been lost since 1991. The Balaitus, Perdigurero and La Munia glaciers have disappeared in this period. Monte Perdido Glacier has shrunk from 90 hectares to 40 hectares.

As initial cause for glacier retreat in the alps since 1850, a decrease of the glaciers' albedo, caused by industrial black carbon can be identified. According to a report, this may have accelerated the retreat of glaciers in Europe which otherwise might have continued to expand until approximately the year 1910.

==== West Asia ====
All the glaciers in Turkey are in retreat and glaciers have been developing proglacial lakes at their terminal ends as the glaciers thin and retreat. Between the 1970s and 2013, the glaciers in Turkey lost half their area, going from 25 km^{2} (9.7 sq mi) in the 1970s to 10.85 km^{2} (4.19 sq mi) in 2013. Of the 14 glaciers studied, five had disappeared altogether. Mount Ararat has the largest glacier in Turkey, and that is forecast to be completely gone by 2065.

==== Siberia and the Russian Far East ====
Siberia is typically classified as a polar region, owing to the dryness of the winter climate and has glaciers only in the high Altai Mountains, Verkhoyansk Range, Cherskiy Range and Suntar-Khayata Range, plus possibly a few very small glaciers in the ranges near Lake Baikal, which have never been monitored and may have completely disappeared since 1989. Between 1952 and 2006, the glaciers found in the Aktru Basin region shrank by 7.2 percent. This shrinkage has been primarily in the ablation zone of the glaciers, with recession of several hundred meters being observed for some glaciers. The Altai region has also experienced an overall temperature increase of 1.2 degrees Celsius in the last 120 years according to a report from 2006, with most of that increase occurring since the late 20th century.

In the more maritime and generally wetter Russian Far East, Kamchatka, exposed during winter to moisture from the Aleutian Low, has much more extensive glaciation totaling around 906 km^{2} (350 sq mi) with 448 known glaciers as of 2010. Despite generally heavy winter snowfall and cool summer temperatures, the high summer rainfall of the more southerly Kuril Islands and Sakhalin in historic times melt rates have been too high for a positive mass balance even on the highest peaks. In the Chukotskiy Peninsula small alpine glaciers are numerous, but the extent of glaciation, though larger than further west, is much smaller than in Kamchatka, totaling around 300 square kilometres (120 mi^{2}).

Details on the retreat of Siberian and Russian Far East glaciers have been less adequate than in most other glaciated areas of the world. There are several reasons for this, the principal one being that since the collapse of Communism there has been a large reduction in the number of monitoring stations. Another factor is that in the Verkhoyansk and Cherskiy Ranges it was thought glaciers were absent before they were discovered during the 1940s, whilst in ultra-remote Kamchatka and Chukotka, although the existence of glaciers was known earlier, monitoring of their size dates back no earlier than the end of World War II. Nonetheless, available records do indicate a general retreat of all glaciers in the Altai Mountains with the exception of volcanic glaciers in Kamchatka. Sakha's glaciers, totaling seventy square kilometers, have shrunk by around 28 percent since 1945 reaching several percent annually in some places, whilst in the Altai and Chukotkan mountains and non-volcanic areas of Kamchatka, the shrinkage is considerably larger.

==== Himalayas and Central Asia ====
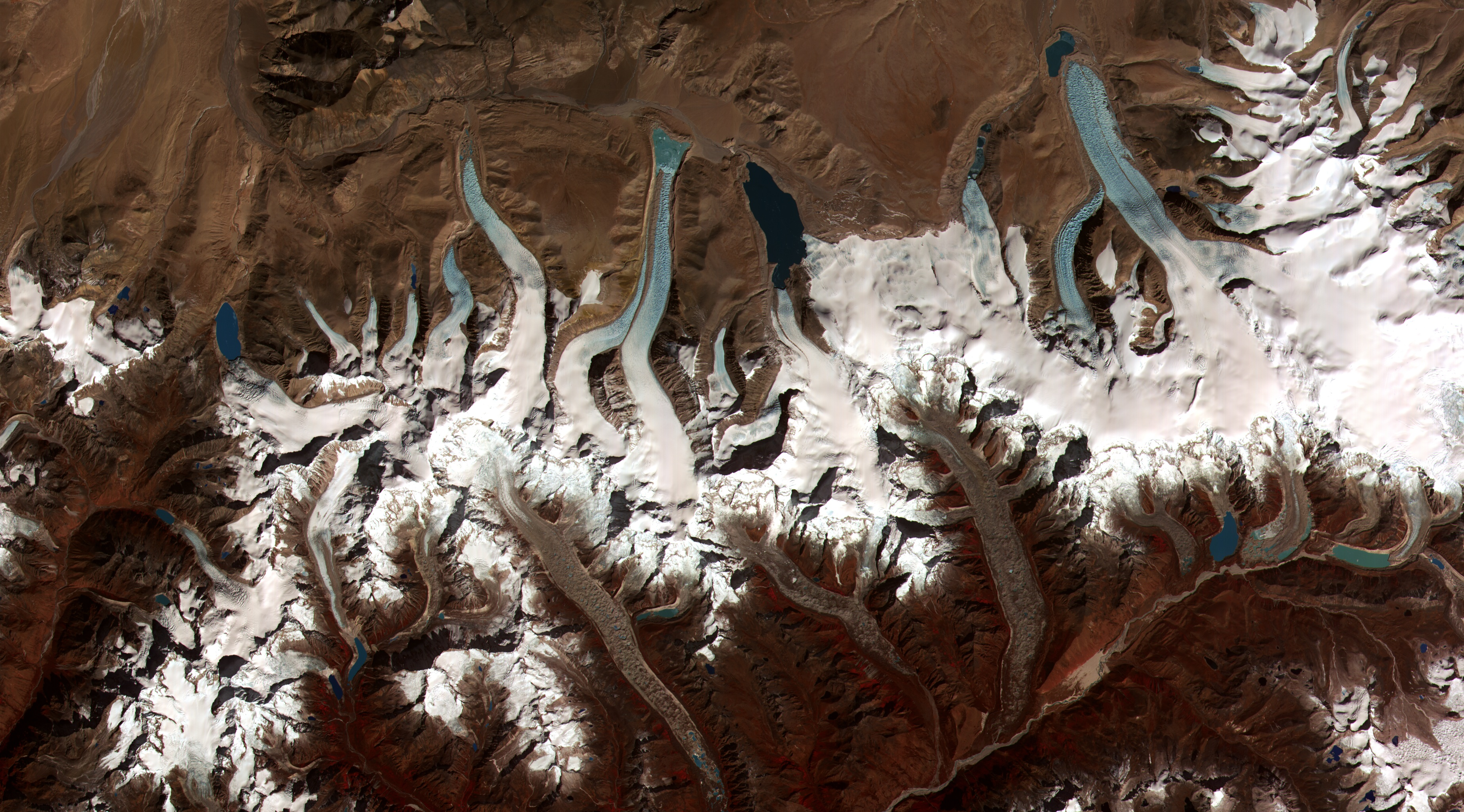
This NASA image shows the formation of numerous glacial lakes at the termini of receding glaciers in Bhutan-Himalaya.

The Himalayas and other mountain chains of central Asia support large glaciated regions. An estimated 15,000 glaciers can be found in the greater Himalayas, with double that number in the Hindu Kush and Karakoram and Tien Shan ranges, and comprise the largest glaciated region outside the poles. These glaciers provide critical water supplies to arid countries such as Mongolia, western China, Pakistan, Afghanistan and India. As with glaciers worldwide, those of the greater Himalayan region are experiencing a decline in mass, and researchers claim that between the early 1970s and early 2000s, there had been a 9 percent reduction in ice mass, while there has been a significant increase in mass loss since the Little Ice Age with a 10-fold increase when compared to rates seen currently. Change in temperature has led to melting and the formation and expansion of glacial lakes which could cause an increase in the number of glacial lake outburst floods (GLOFs). If the present trends persist the ice mass will gradually be reduced, and will affect the availability of water resources, though water loss is not expected to cause problems for many decades.

In the Wakhan Corridor of Afghanistan 28 of 30 glaciers examined retreated significantly between 1976 and 2003, with an average retreat of 11 m (36 ft) per year. One of these glaciers, the Zemestan Glacier, retreated 460 m (1,510 ft) during this period, not quite 10% of its 5.2 km (3.2 mi) length. In examining 612 glaciers in China between 1950 and 1970, 53% of the glaciers studied were retreating. After 1990, 95% of these glaciers were measured to be retreating, indicating that retreat of these glaciers was becoming more widespread. Glaciers in the Mount Everest region of the Himalayas are all in a state of retreat. The Rongbuk Glacier, draining the north side of Mount Everest into Tibet, has been retreating 20 m (66 ft) per year. In the Khumbu region of Nepal along the front of the main Himalaya of 15 glaciers examined from 1976 to 2007 all retreated significantly and the average retreat was 28 m (92 ft) per year. The most famous of these, the Khumbu Glacier, retreated at a rate of 18 m (59 ft) per year from 1976 to 2007. In India, the Gangotri Glacier retreated 1,147 m (3,763 ft) between 1936 and 1996 with 850 m (2,790 ft) of that retreat occurring in the last 25 years of the 20th century. However, the glacier is still over 30 km (19 mi) long. In Sikkim, 26 glaciers examined between 1976 and 2005 were retreating at an average rate of 13.02 m (42.7 ft) per year. Overall, glaciers in the Greater Himalayan region that have been studied are retreating an average of between 18 and 20 m (59 and 66 ft) annually. The only region in the Greater Himalaya that has seen glacial advances is in the Karakoram Range and only in the highest elevation glaciers, but this has been attributed possibly increased precipitation as well as to the correlating glacial surges, where the glacier tongue advances due to pressure build up from snow and ice accumulation further up the glacier. Between 1997 and 2001, 68 km (42 mi) long Biafo Glacier thickened 10 to 25 m (33 to 82 ft) mid-glacier, however it did not advance.

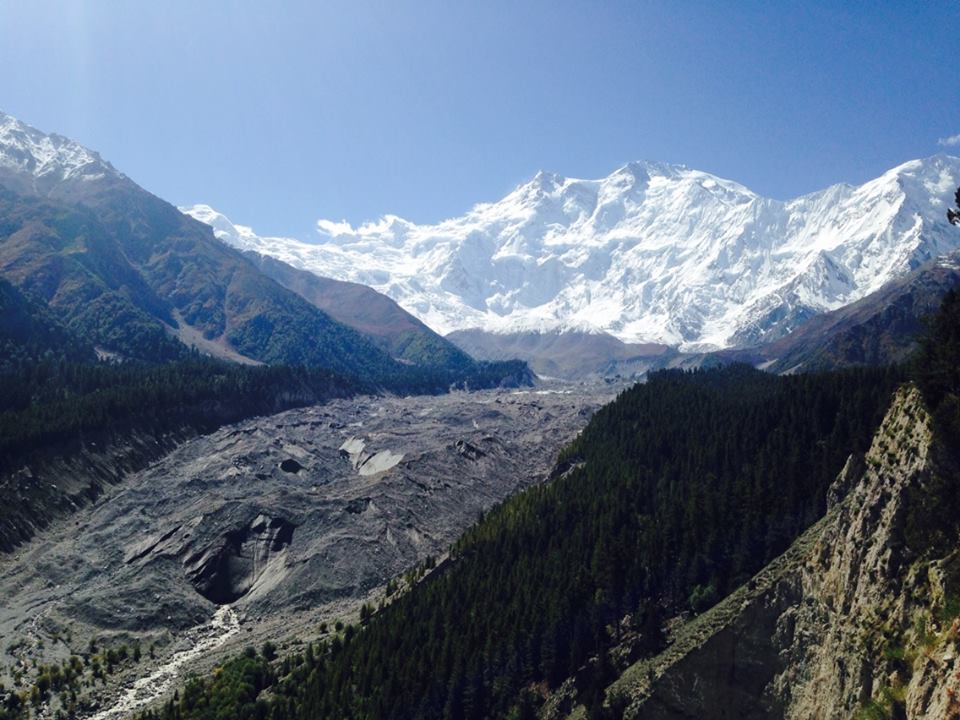
Glacial retreat in Nanga Parbat, Pakistan

With the retreat of glaciers in the Himalayas, a number of glacial lakes have been created. A growing concern is the potential for GLOFs researchers estimate 21 glacial lakes in Nepal and 24 in Bhutan pose hazards to human populations should their terminal moraines fail. One glacial lake identified as potentially hazardous is Bhutan's Raphstreng Tsho, which measured 1.6 km (0.99 mi) long, 0.96 km (0.60 mi) wide and 80 m (260 ft) deep in 1986. By 1995 the lake had swollen to a length of 1.94 km (1.21 mi), 1.13 km (0.70 mi) in width and a depth of 107 m (351 ft). In 1994 a GLOF from Luggye Tsho, a glacial lake adjacent to Raphstreng Tsho, killed 23 people downstream.

Glaciers in the Ak-shirak Range in Kyrgyzstan experienced a slight loss between 1943 and 1977 and an accelerated loss of 20% of their remaining mass between 1977 and 2001. In the Tien Shan mountains, which Kyrgyzstan shares with China and Kazakhstan, studies in the northern areas of that mountain range show that the glaciers that help supply water to this arid region, lost nearly 2 km^{3} (0.48 mi^{3}) of ice per year between 1955 and 2000. The University of Oxford study also reported that an average of 1.28% of the volume of these glaciers had been lost per year between 1974 and 1990.

The Pamirs mountain range located primarily in Tajikistan, has approximately eight thousand glaciers, many of which are in a general state of retreat. During the 20th century, the glaciers of Tajikistan lost 20 km^{3} (4.8 mi^{3}) of ice. The 70 km (43 mi) long Fedchenko Glacier, which is the largest in Tajikistan and the largest non-polar glacier on Earth, retreated 1 km (0.62 mi) between 1933 and 2006, and lost 44 km^{2} (17 sq mi) of its surface area due to shrinkage between 1966 and 2000. Tajikistan and neighboring countries of the Pamir Range are highly dependent upon glacial runoff to ensure river flow during droughts and the dry seasons experienced every year. The continued demise of glacier ice will result in a short-term increase, followed by a long-term decrease in glacial melt water flowing into rivers and streams.

=== Northern hemisphere – North America ===
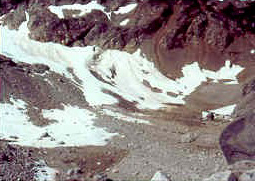
The Lewis Glacier, North Cascades National Park after melting away in 1990

North American glaciers are primarily located along the spine of the Rocky Mountains in the United States and Canada, and the Pacific Coast Ranges extending from northern California to Alaska. While Greenland is geologically associated with North America, it is also a part of the Arctic region. Apart from the few tidewater glaciers such as Taku Glacier, in the advance stage of their tidewater glacier cycle prevalent along the coast of Alaska, virtually all of those in North America are in a state of retreat. This rate has increased rapidly since around 1980, and overall each decade since has seen greater rates of retreat than the preceding one. There are also small remnant glaciers scattered throughout the Sierra Nevada mountains of California and Nevada.

==== Cascade Range ====
The Cascade Range of western North America extends from southern British Columbia in Canada to northern California. Excepting Alaska, about half of the glacial area in the U.S. is contained within the over 700 glaciers of the North Cascades, a portion of those located between the Canada–US border and I-90 in central Washington. These contain as much water as is found in all the lakes and reservoirs in the rest of the state, and provide much of the stream and river flow in the dry summer months, approximating some 870,000 m^{3} (1,140,000 yd^{3}).

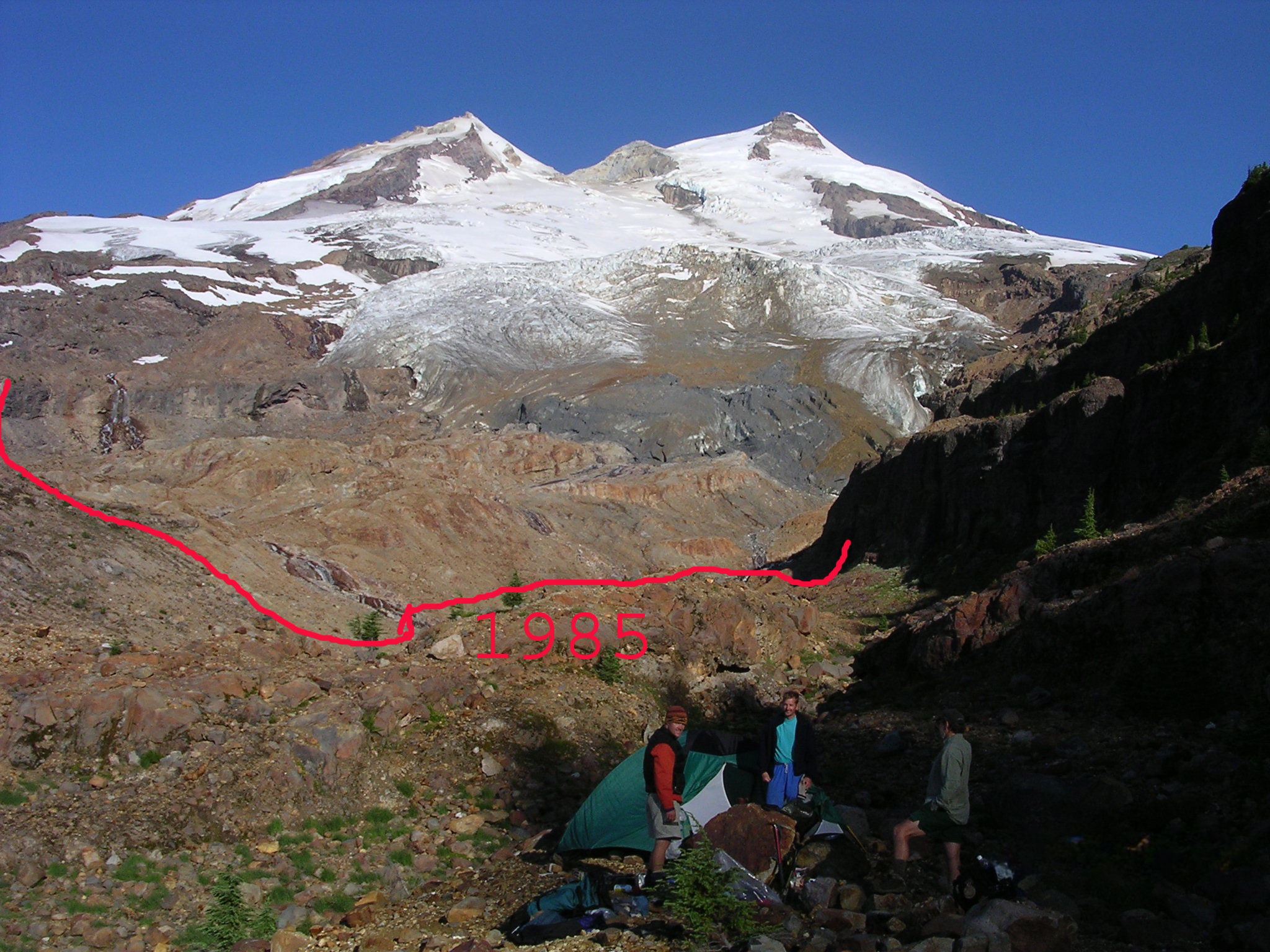
The Boulder Glacier retreated 450 m (1,480 ft) from 1987 to 2003.

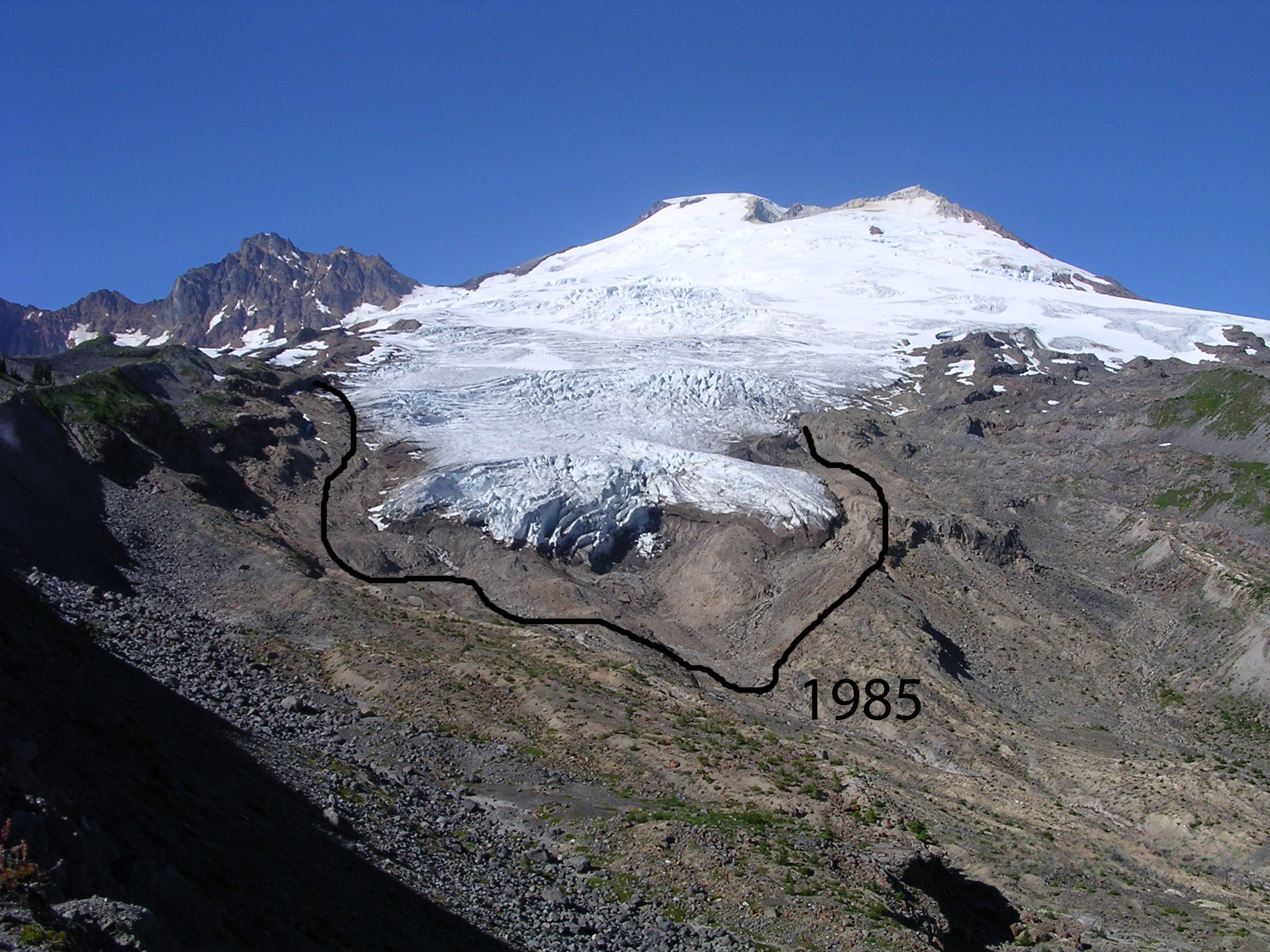
The Easton Glacier retreated 255 m (837 ft) from 1990 to 2005.

As recently as 1975 many North Cascade glaciers were advancing due to cooler weather and increased precipitation that occurred from 1944 to 1976. By 1987 the North Cascade glaciers were retreating and the pace had increased each decade since the mid-1970s. Between 1984 and 2005 the North Cascade glaciers lost an average of more than 12.5 metres (41 ft) in thickness and 20–40 percent of their volume.

Glaciologists researching the North Cascades found that all 47 monitored glaciers are receding while four glaciers—Spider Glacier, Lewis Glacier, Milk Lake Glacier and Mt. David Glacier—are almost completely gone. The White Chuck Glacier (near Glacier Peak) is a particularly dramatic example. The glacier area shrank from 3.1 km^{2} (1.2 sq mi) in 1958 to 0.9 km^{2} (0.35 sq mi) by 2002. Between 1850 and 1950, the Boulder Glacier on the southeast flank of Mount Baker retreated 8,700 feet (2,700 m). William Long of the United States Forest Service observed the glacier beginning to advance due to cooler/wetter weather in 1953. This was followed by a 743 metres (2,438 ft) advance by 1979. The glacier again retreated 450 m (1,480 ft) from 1987 to 2005, leaving barren terrain behind. This retreat has occurred during a period of reduced winter snowfall and higher summer temperatures. In this region of the Cascades, winter snowpack has declined 25% since 1946, and summer temperatures have risen 0.7 °C (1.2 °F) during the same period. The reduced snowpack has occurred despite a small increase in winter precipitation—thus, it reflects warmer winter temperatures leading to rainfall and melting on glaciers even during the winter. As of 2005, 67% of the North Cascade glaciers observed are in disequilibrium and will not survive the continuation of the present climate. These glaciers will eventually disappear unless temperatures fall and frozen precipitation increases. The remaining glaciers are expected to stabilize, unless the climate continues to warm, but will be much reduced in size.

==== U.S. Rocky Mountains ====
On the sheltered slopes of the highest peaks of Glacier National Park in Montana, the eponymous glaciers are diminishing rapidly. The area of each glacier has been mapped for decades by the National Park Service and the U.S. Geological Survey. Comparing photographs from the mid-19th century with contemporary images provides ample evidence that they have retreated notably since 1850. Repeat photography since clearly show that glaciers such as Grinnell Glacier are all retreating. The larger glaciers are now approximately a third of their former size when first studied in 1850, and numerous smaller glaciers have disappeared completely. Only 27% of the 99 km^{2} (38 sq mi) area of Glacier National Park covered by glaciers in 1850 remained covered by 1993. Researchers believe that between the year 2030 and 2080, that some glacial ice in Glacier National Park will be gone unless current climate patterns reverse their course. Grinnell Glacier is just one of many glaciers in Glacier National Park that have been well documented by photographs for many decades. The photographs below clearly demonstrate the retreat of this glacier since 1938.

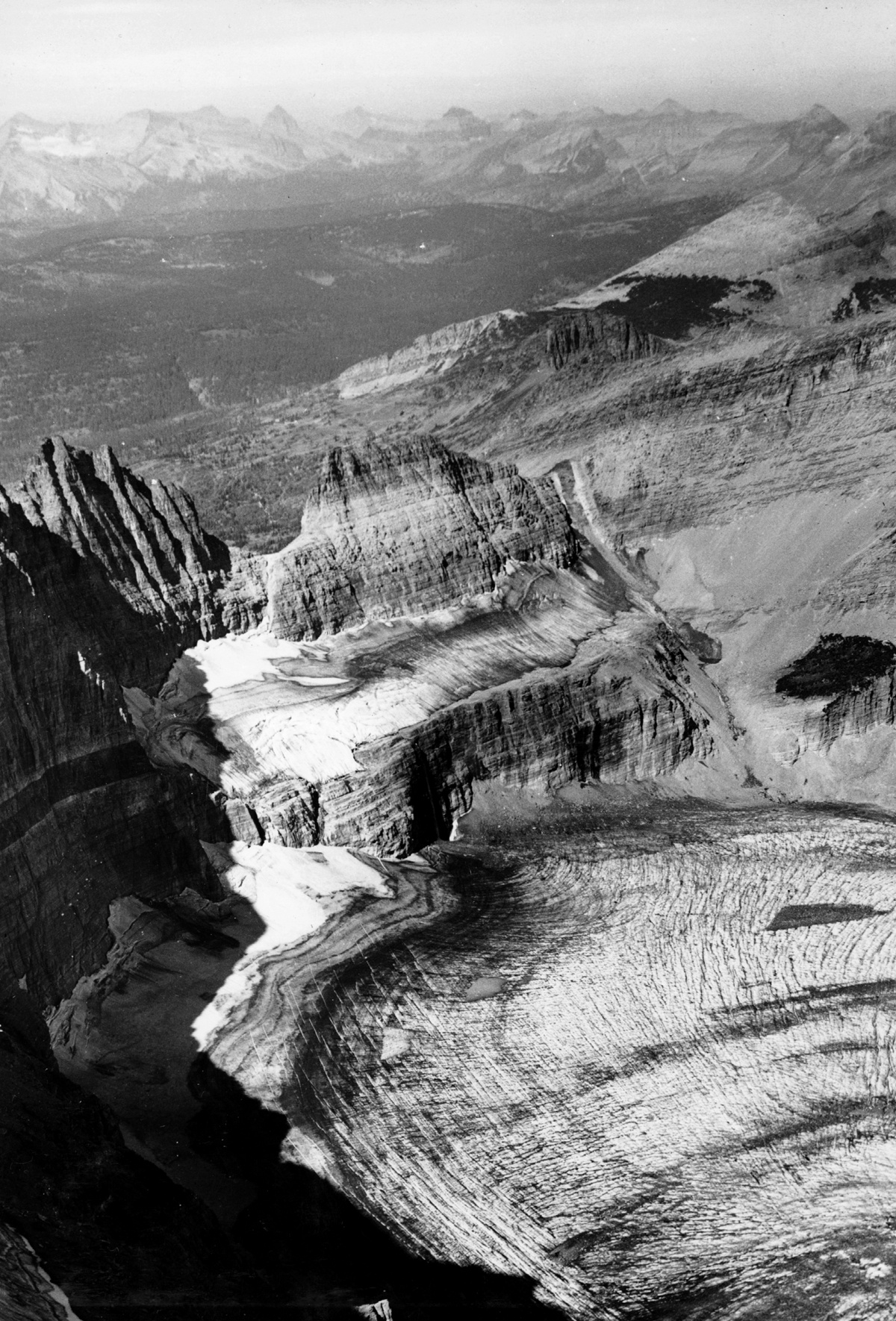
1938 T.J. Hileman GNP

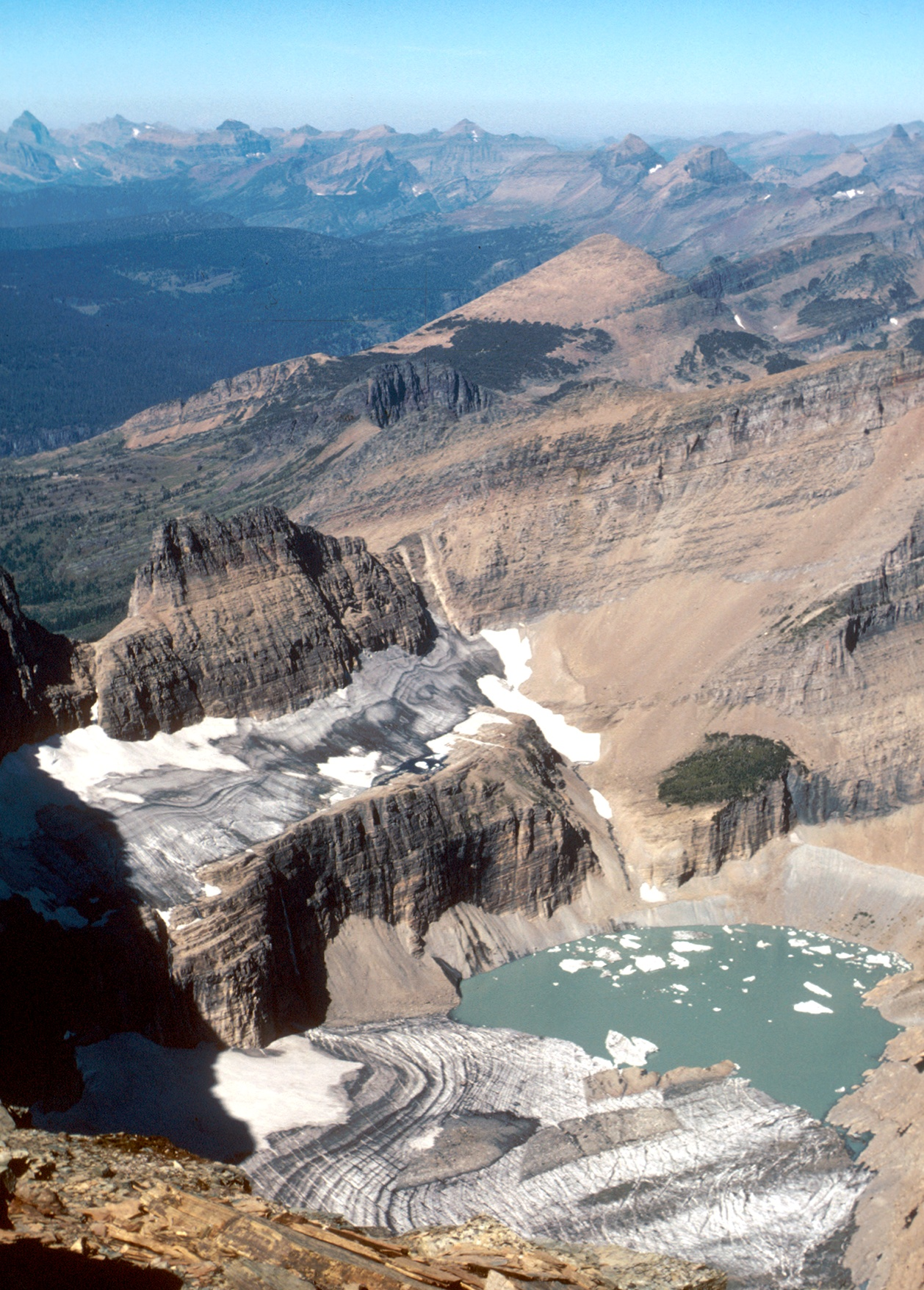
1981 Carl Key (USGS)

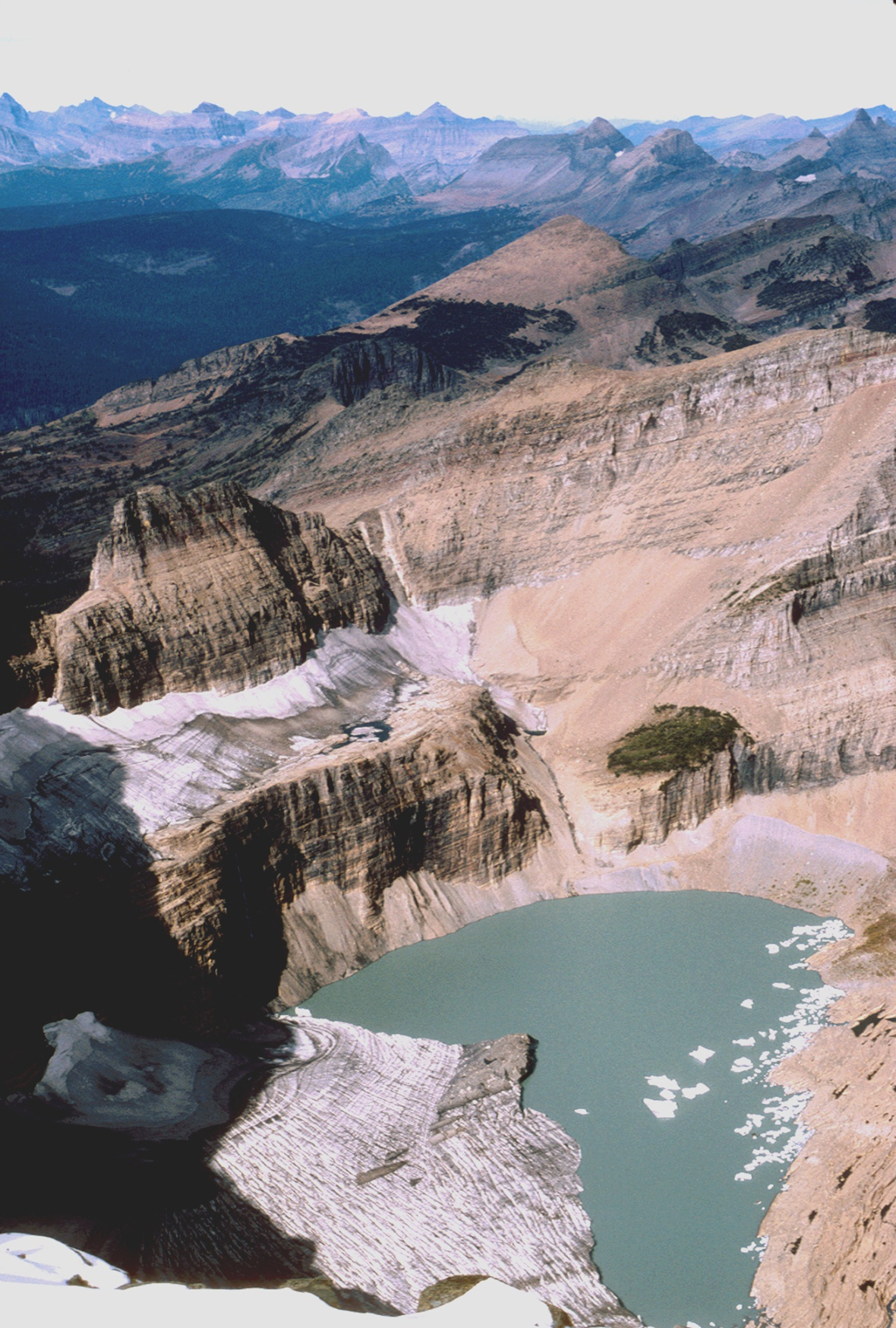
1998 Dan Fagre (USGS)

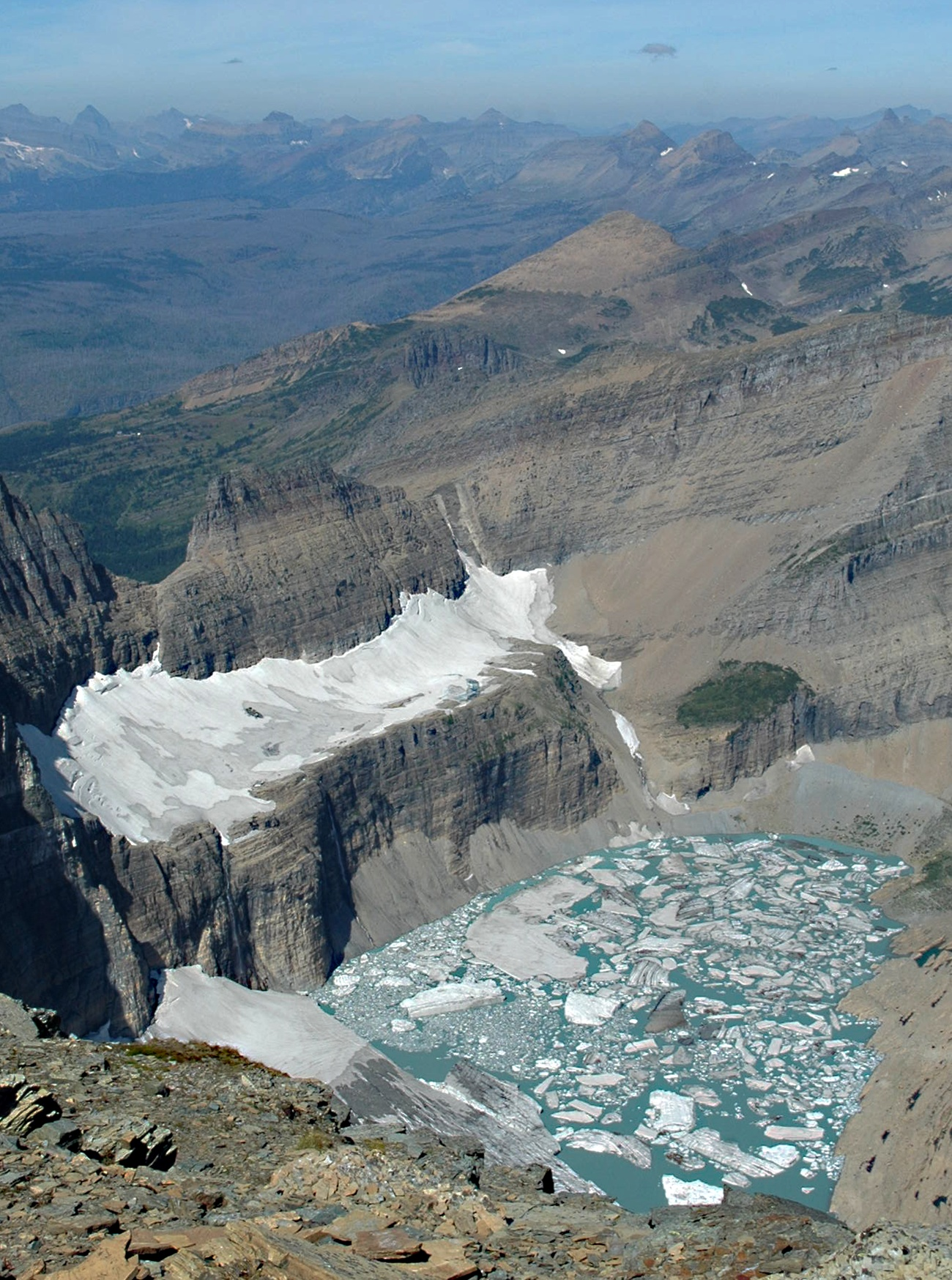
2009 Lindsey Bengtson (USGS)

The semiarid climate of Wyoming still manages to support about a dozen small glaciers within Grand Teton National Park, which all show evidence of retreat over the past 50 years. Schoolroom Glacier is located slightly southwest of Grand Teton is one of the more easily reached glaciers in the park and it is expected to disappear by 2025. Research between 1950 and 1999 demonstrated that the glaciers in Bridger-Teton National Forest and Shoshone National Forest in the Wind River Range shrank by over a third of their size during that period. Photographs indicate that the glaciers today are only half the size as when first photographed in the late 1890s. Research also indicates that the glacial retreat was proportionately greater in the 1990s than in any other decade over the last 100 years. Gannett Glacier on the northeast slope of Gannett Peak is the largest single glacier in the Rocky Mountains south of Canada. It has reportedly lost over 50% of its volume since 1920, with almost half of that loss occurring since 1980. Glaciologists believe the remaining glaciers in Wyoming will disappear by the middle of the 21st century if the current climate patterns continue.

==== Canadian Rockies and Coast and Columbia Mountains ====
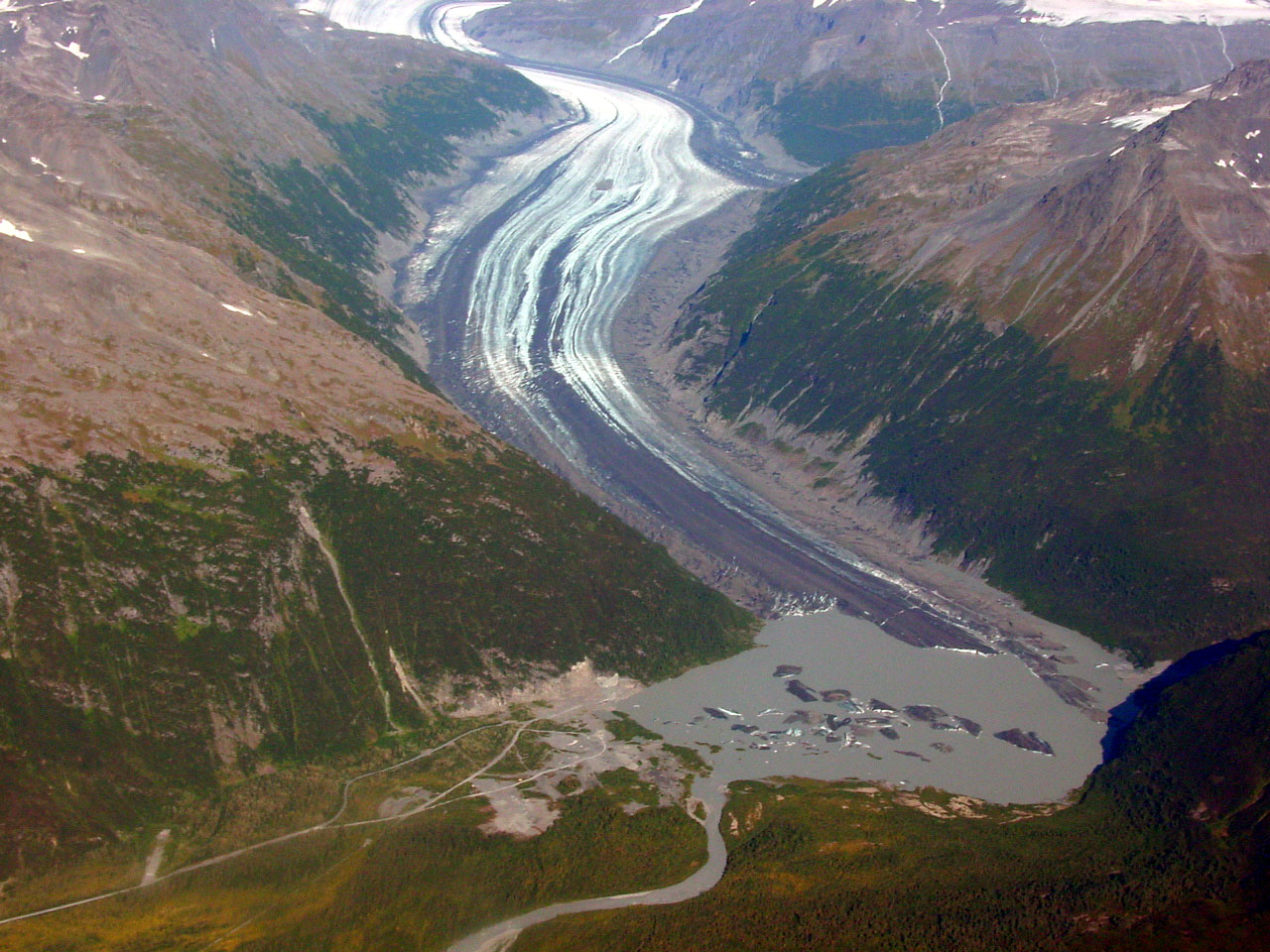
Valdez Glacier has thinned 90 m (300 ft) over the last century, exposing barren ground near the glacial margins.

In the Canadian Rockies, glaciers are generally larger and more widespread than to the south in the U.S. Rocky Mountains. One of the more accessible in the Canadian Rockies is the Athabasca Glacier, which is an outlet glacier of the 325 km^{2} (125 sq mi) Columbia Icefield. The Athabasca Glacier has retreated 1,500 m (4,900 ft) since the late 19th century. Its rate of retreat has increased since 1980, following a period of slow retreat from 1950 to 1980. The Peyto Glacier in Alberta covers an area of about 12 km^{2} (4.6 sq mi), and retreated rapidly during the first half of the 20th century, stabilized by 1966, and resumed shrinking in 1976. The Illecillewaet Glacier in British Columbia's Glacier National Park (Canada), part of the Selkirk Mountains (west of the Rockies) has retreated 2 km (1.2 mi) since first photographed in 1887.

In Garibaldi Provincial Park in Southwestern British Columbia over 505 km^{2} (195 sq mi), or 26%, of the park, was covered by glacier ice at the beginning of the 18th century. Ice cover decreased to 297 km^{2} (115 sq mi) by 1987–1988 and to 245 km^{2} (95 sq mi) by 2005, 50% of the 1850 area. The 50 km^{2} (19 sq mi) loss in the last 20 years coincides with negative mass balance in the region. During this period all nine glaciers examined have retreated significantly.

==== Alaska ====
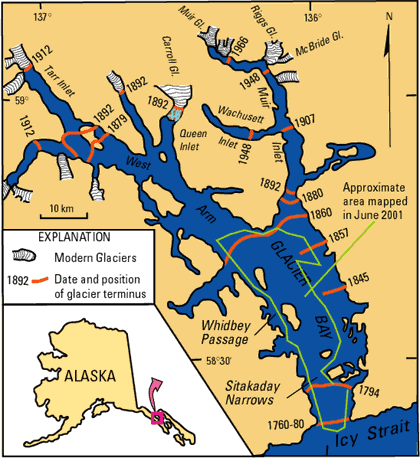
Map of Glacier Bay. Red lines show glacial terminus positions and dates during retreat of the Little Ice Age glacier.

There are thousands of glaciers in Alaska but only few have been named. The Columbia Glacier near Valdez in Prince William Sound retreated 15 km (9.3 mi) in the 25 years from 1980 to 2005. Its calved icebergs partially caused the Exxon Valdez oil spill, when the tanker changed course to avoid the ice tips. The Valdez Glacier is in the same area, and though it does not calve, has also retreated significantly. "A 2005 aerial survey of Alaskan coastal glaciers identified more than a dozen glaciers, many former tidewater and calving glaciers, including Grand Plateau, Alsek, Bear, and Excelsior Glaciers that are rapidly retreating. Of 2,000 glaciers observed, 99% are retreating." Icy Bay in Alaska is fed by three large glaciers—Guyot, Yahtse, and Tyndall Glaciers—all of which have experienced a loss in length and thickness and, consequently, a loss in area. Tyndall Glacier became separated from the retreating Guyot Glacier in the 1960s and has retreated 24 km (15 mi) since, averaging more than 500 m (1,600 ft) per year.

The Juneau Icefield Research Program has monitored outlet glaciers of the Juneau Icefield since 1946. On the west side of the ice field, the terminus of the Mendenhall Glacier, which flows into suburban Juneau, Alaska, has retreated 580 m (1,900 ft). Of the nineteen glaciers of the Juneau Icefield, eighteen are retreating, and one, the Taku Glacier, is advancing. Eleven of the glaciers have retreated more than 1 km (0.62 mi) since 1948 – Antler Glacier, 5.4 km (3.4 mi); Gilkey Glacier, 3.5 km (2.2 mi); Norris Glacier, 1.1 km (0.68 mi) and Lemon Creek Glacier, 1.5 km (0.93 mi). Taku Glacier has been advancing since at least 1890, when naturalist John Muir observed a large iceberg calving front. By 1948 the adjacent fjord had filled in, and the glacier no longer calved and was able to continue its advance. By 2005 the glacier was only 1.5 km (0.93 mi) from reaching Taku Point and blocking Taku Inlet. The advance of Taku Glacier averaged 17 m (56 ft) per year between 1988 and 2005. The mass balance was very positive for the 1946–88 period fueling the advance; however, since 1988 the mass balance has been slightly negative, which should in the future slow the advance of this mighty glacier.

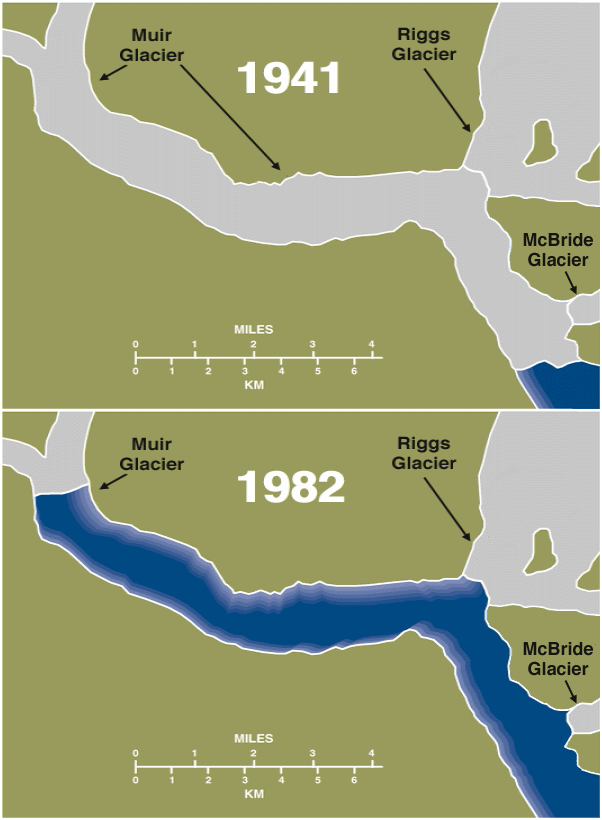
Maps showing retreat of Muir Glacier from 1941 to 1982

Long-term mass balance records from Lemon Creek Glacier in Alaska show slightly declining mass balance with time. The mean annual balance for this glacier was −0.23 m (0.75 ft) each year during the period of 1957 to 1976. Mean annual balance has been increasingly negatively averaging −1.04 m (3.4 ft) per year from 1990 to 2005. Repeat glacier altimetry, or altitude measuring, for 67 Alaska glaciers find rates of thinning have increased by more than a factor of two when comparing the periods from 1950 to 1995 (0.7 m (2.3 ft) per year) and 1995 to 2001 (1.8 m (5.9 ft) per year). This is a systemic trend with loss in mass equating to loss in thickness, which leads to increasing retreat—the glaciers are not only retreating, but they are also becoming much thinner. In Denali National Park, all glaciers monitored are retreating, with an average retreat of 20 m (66 ft) per year. The terminus of the Toklat Glacier has been retreating 26 m (85 ft) per year and the Muldrow Glacier has thinned 20 m (66 ft) since 1979. Well documented in Alaska are surging glaciers that have been known to rapidly advance, even as much as 100 m (330 ft) per day. Variegated, Black Rapids, Muldrow, Susitna and Yanert are examples of surging glaciers in Alaska that have made rapid advances in the past. These glaciers are all retreating overall, punctuated by short periods of advance.

=== Southern hemisphere ===
In all, about 25 percent of the ice that melted between 2003 and 2010 occurred in the Americas (excluding Greenland) (data from 2012).

==== Andes and Tierra del Fuego ====
Retreat of San Rafael Glacier from 1990 to 2000. San Quintín Glacier is shown in the background.

A large region of population surrounding the central and southern Andes of Argentina and Chile reside in arid areas that are dependent on water supplies from melting glaciers. The water from the glaciers also supplies rivers that have in some cases been dammed for hydroelectric power. Some researchers believe that by 2030, many of the large ice caps on the highest Andes will be gone if current climate trends continue. In Patagonia on the southern tip of the continent, the large ice caps have retreated a 1 km (0.62 mi) since the early 1990s and 10 km (6.2 mi) since the late 19th century. It has also been observed that Patagonian glaciers are receding at a faster rate than in any other world region. The Northern Patagonian Ice Field lost 93 km^{2} (36 sq mi) of glacier area during the years between 1945 and 1975, and 174 km^{2} (67 sq mi) from 1975 to 1996, which indicates that the rate of retreat is increasing. This represents a loss of 8% of the ice field, with all glaciers experiencing significant retreat. The Southern Patagonian Ice Field has exhibited a general trend of retreat on 42 glaciers, while four glaciers were in equilibrium and two advanced during the years between 1944 and 1986. The largest retreat was on O'Higgins Glacier, which during the period 1896–1995 retreated 14.6 km (9.1 mi). The Perito Moreno Glacier is 30 km (19 mi) long and is a major outflow glacier of the Patagonian ice sheet, as well as the most visited glacier in Patagonia. Perito Moreno Glacier is in equilibrium, but has undergone frequent oscillations in the period 1947–96, with a net gain of 4.1 km (2.5 mi). This glacier has advanced since 1947, and has been essentially stable since 1992. Perito Moreno Glacier is one of three glaciers in Patagonia known to have advanced, compared to several hundred others in retreat. The two major glaciers of the Southern Patagonia Icefield to the north of Moreno, Upsala and Viedma Glacier have retreated 4.6 km (2.9 mi) in 21 years and 1 km (0.62 mi) in 13 years respectively. In the Aconcagua River Basin, glacier retreat has resulted in a 20% loss in glacier area, declining from 151 km^{2} (58 sq mi) to 121 km^{2} (47 sq mi). The Marinelli Glacier in Tierra del Fuego has been in retreat since at least 1960 through 2008.

==== Oceania ====
These glaciers in New Zealand have continued to retreat rapidly in recent years. Notice the larger terminal lakes, the retreat of the white ice (ice free of moraine cover), and the higher moraine walls due to ice thinning. Photo.

In New Zealand, mountain glaciers have been in general retreat since 1890, with an acceleration since 1920. Most have measurably thinned and reduced in size, and the snow accumulation zones have risen in elevation as the 20th century progressed. Between 1971 and 1975 Ivory Glacier receded 30 m (98 ft) from the glacial terminus, and about 26% of its surface area was lost. Since 1980 numerous small glacial lakes formed behind the new terminal moraines of several of these glaciers. Glaciers such as Classen, Godley and Douglas now all have new glacial lakes below their terminal locations due to the glacial retreat over the past 20 years. Satellite imagery indicates that these lakes are continuing to expand. There has been significant and ongoing ice volume losses on the largest New Zealand glaciers, including the Tasman, Ivory, Classen, Mueller, Maud, Hooker, Grey, Godley, Ramsay, Murchison, Therma, Volta and Douglas Glaciers. The retreat of these glaciers has been marked by expanding proglacial lakes and terminus region thinning. The loss in Southern Alps total ice volume from 1976 to 2014 is 34 percent of the total.

Several glaciers, notably the much-visited Fox and Franz Josef Glaciers on New Zealand's West Coast, have periodically advanced, especially during the 1990s, but the scale of these advances is small when compared to 20th-century retreat. Both are more than 2.5 km (1.6 mi) shorter than a century ago. These large, rapidly flowing glaciers situated on steep slopes have been very reactive to small mass-balance changes. A few years of conditions favorable to glacier advance, such as more westerly winds and a resulting increase in snowfall, are rapidly echoed in a corresponding advance, followed by equally rapid retreat when those favorable conditions end.

== Polar regions ==
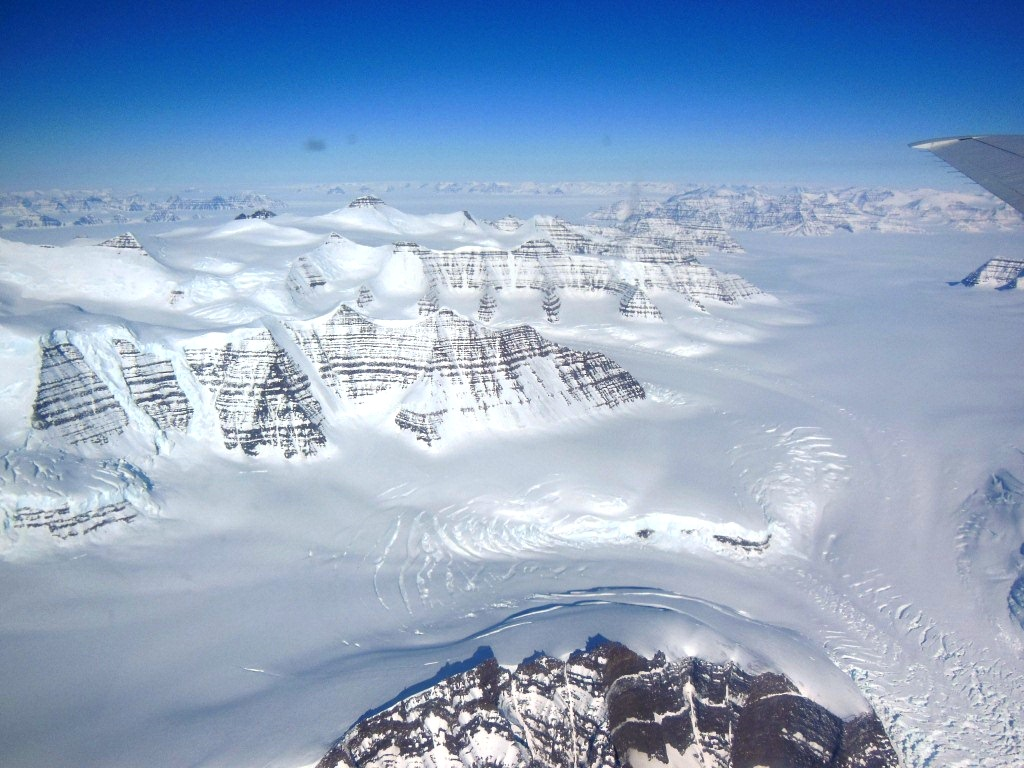
Glacier of the Geikie Plateau in Greenland.

Despite their proximity and importance to human populations, the mountain and valley glaciers of tropical and mid-latitude glaciers amount to only a small fraction of glacial ice on the Earth. About 99 percent of all freshwater ice is in the great ice sheets of polar and subpolar Antarctica and Greenland. These continuous continental-scale ice sheets, 3 km (1.9 mi) or more in thickness, cap much of the polar and subpolar land masses. Like rivers flowing from an enormous lake, numerous outlet glaciers transport ice from the margins of the ice sheet to the ocean.

=== North America ===
==== Greenland ====
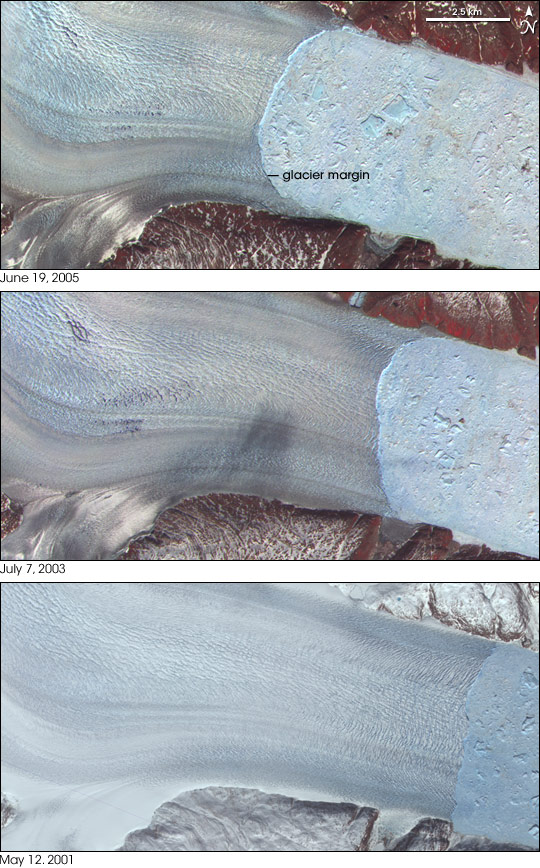
Retreat of the Helheim Glacier, Greenland

In Greenland, glacier retreat has been observed in outlet glaciers, resulting in an increase of the ice flow rate and destabilization of the mass balance of the ice sheet that is their source. The net loss in volume and hence sea level contribution of the Greenland Ice Sheet (GIS) has doubled in recent years from 90 km^{3} (22 mi^{3}) per year in 1996 to 220 km^{3} (53 mi^{3}) per year in 2005. Researchers also noted that the acceleration was widespread affecting almost all glaciers south of 70 N by 2005. The period since 2000 has brought retreat to several very large glaciers that had long been stable. Three glaciers that have been researched—Helheim Glacier, Kangerdlugssuaq Glacier, and Jakobshavn Isbræ—jointly drain more than 16% of the Greenland Ice Sheet. In the case of Helheim Glacier, researchers used satellite images to determine the movement and retreat of the glacier. Satellite images and aerial photographs from the 1950s and 1970s show that the front of the glacier had remained in the same place for decades. In 2001 the glacier began retreating rapidly, and by 2005 the glacier had retreated a total of 7.2 km (4.5 mi), accelerating from 20 m (66 ft) per day to 35 m (115 ft) per day during that period.

Jakobshavn Isbræ in west Greenland, a major outlet glacier of the Greenland Ice Sheet, was the fastest moving glacier in the world over the past half century. It had been moving continuously at speeds of over 24 m (79 ft) per day with a stable terminus since at least 1950. In 2002 the 12 km (7.5 mi) long floating terminus of the glacier entered a phase of rapid retreat, with the ice front breaking up and the floating terminus disintegrating and accelerating to a retreat rate of over 30 m (98 ft) per day. No longer. The glacier has "slammed the brakes" and is now getting thicker (growing in height) 20 meters each year.

On a shorter timescale, portions of the main trunk of Kangerdlugssuaq Glacier that were flowing at 15 m (49 ft) per day from 1988 to 2001 were measured to be flowing at 40 m (130 ft) per day in the summer of 2005. Not only has Kangerdlugssuaq retreated, it has also thinned by more than 100 m (330 ft).

The rapid thinning, acceleration and retreat of Helheim, Jakobshavns and Kangerdlugssuaq glaciers in Greenland, all in close association with one another, suggests a common triggering mechanism, such as enhanced surface melting due to regional climate warming or a change in forces at the glacier front. The enhanced melting leading to lubrication of the glacier base has been observed to cause a small seasonal velocity increase and the release of meltwater lakes has also led to only small short term accelerations. The significant accelerations noted on the three largest glaciers began at the calving front and propagated inland and are not seasonal in nature. Thus, the primary source of outlet glacier acceleration widely observed on small and large calving glaciers in Greenland is driven by changes in dynamic forces at the glacier front, not enhanced meltwater lubrication. This was termed the Jakobshavns Effect by Terence Hughes at the University of Maine in 1986. Indeed, a study published in 2015 on glacial underwater topography at 3 sites found cavities, due to warm subglacial water intrusion, which has been identified as a possible dominant force for ablation (surface erosion). Thus, suggests ocean temperature controls ice sheet surface runoff at specific sites. These findings also show that models underestimate the sensitivity of Greenland glaciers to ocean warming and resulting ice sheet runoff. Hence, without better modelling, new observations suggest that past projections of sea level rise attribution from the Greenland Ice Sheet require upward revision.

According to one study, in the years 2002–2019 Greenland lost 4,550 gigaton of ice, 268 gigaton per year, on average. In 2019 Greenland lost 600 gigaton of ice in two months contributing 2.2 mm to global sea level rise

A benefit of glacier melting is resulting deposit of one billion tons of rock flour annually, which has great potential as soil conditioner and for direct air capture of carbon.

==== Canada ====
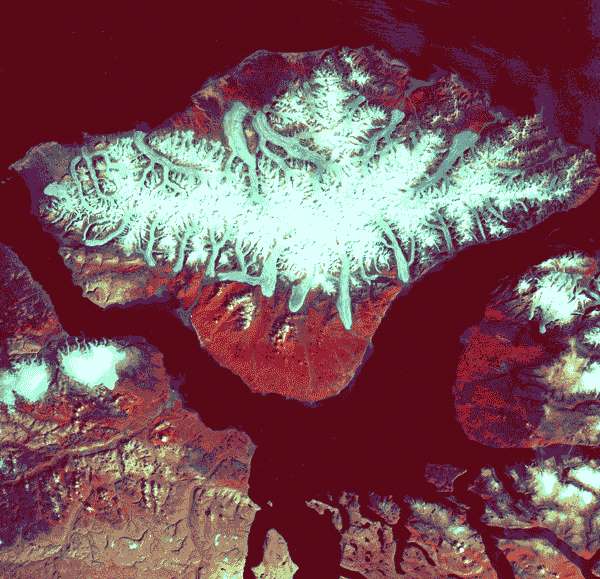
Bylot Ice Cap on Bylot Island, one of the Canadian Arctic islands, August 14, 1975 (USGS)

The Canadian Arctic islands contain the largest area and volume of land ice on Earth outside of the Greenland and Antarctic Ice Sheets and is home to a number of substantial ice caps, including Penny and Barnes ice caps on Baffin Island, Bylot Ice Cap on Bylot Island, and Devon Ice Cap on Devon Island. Glaciers in the Canadian Arctic were near equilibrium between 1960 and 2000, losing 23 Gt of ice per year between 1995 and 2000. Since this time, Canadian Arctic glaciers have experienced a sharp increase in mass loss in response to warmer summer temperature, losing 92 Gt per year between 2007 and 2009 .

Other studies show that between 1960 and 1999, the Devon Ice Cap lost 67 km^{3} (16 mi^{3}) of ice, mainly through thinning. All major outlet glaciers along the eastern Devon Ice Cap margin have retreated from 1 km (0.62 mi) to 3 km (1.9 mi) since 1960. On the Hazen Plateau of Ellesmere Island, the Simmon Ice Cap has lost 47% of its area since 1959. If the current climatic conditions continue, the remaining glacial ice on the Hazen Plateau will be gone around 2050. On August 13, 2005, the Ayles Ice Shelf broke free from the north coast of Ellesmere Island. The 66 km^{2} (25 sq mi) ice shelf drifted into the Arctic Ocean. This followed the splitting of the Ward Hunt Ice Shelf in 2002. The Ward Hunt has lost 90% of its area in the last century.

=== Northern Europe ===
Arctic islands north of Norway, Finland and Russia have all shown evidence of glacier retreat. In the Svalbard archipelago, the island of Spitsbergen has numerous glaciers. Research indicates that Hansbreen (Hans Glacier) on Spitsbergen retreated 1.4 km (0.87 mi) from 1936 to 1982 and another 400 m (1,300 ft) during the 16-year period from 1982 to 1998. Blomstrandbreen, a glacier in the King's Bay area of Spitsbergen, has retreated approximately 2 km (1.2 mi) in the past 80 years. Since 1960 the average retreat of Blomstrandbreen has been about 35 m (115 ft) a year, and this average was enhanced due to an accelerated rate of retreat since 1995. Similarly, Midre Lovenbreen retreated 200 m (660 ft) between 1977 and 1995. In the Novaya Zemlya archipelago north of Russia, research indicates that in 1952 there was 208 km (129 mi) of glacier ice along the coast. By 1993 this had been reduced by 8% to 198 km (123 mi) of glacier coastline.

==== Iceland ====
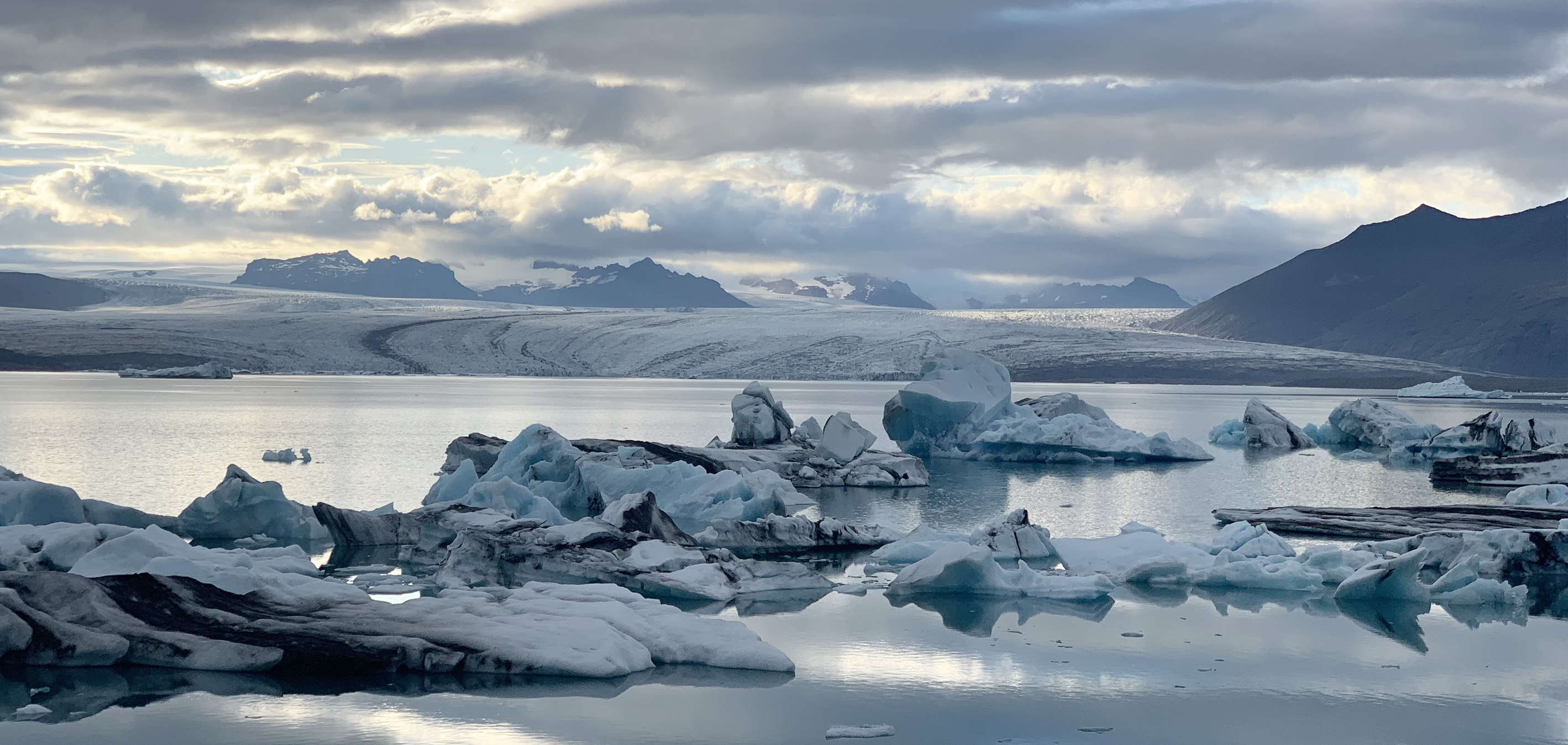
Ice lagoon Jökulsárlón at the foot of the Vatnajökull Glacier, Iceland, 2023

The northern Atlantic island nation of Iceland is home to Vatnajökull, which is the largest ice cap in Europe. The Breiðamerkurjökull glacier is one of Vatnajökull's outlet glaciers, and receded by as much as 2 km (1.2 mi) between 1973 and 2004. In the early 20th century, Breiðamerkurjökull extended to within 250 m (820 ft) of the ocean, but by 2004 its terminus had retreated 3 km (1.9 mi) further inland. This glacier retreat exposed a rapidly expanding lagoon, Jökulsárlón, which is filled with icebergs calved from its front. Jökulsárlón is 110 m (360 ft) deep and nearly doubled its size between 1994 and 2004. Mass-balance measurements of Iceland's glaciers show alternating positive and negative mass balance of glaciers during the period 1987–1995, but the mass balance has been predominantly negative since. On Hofsjökull ice cap, mass balance has been negative each year from 1995 to 2005.

Most of the Icelandic glaciers retreated rapidly during the warm decades from 1930 to 1960, slowing down as the climate cooled during the following decade, and started to advance after 1970. The rate of advance peaked in the 1980s, after which it slowed down until about 1990. As a consequence of rapid warming of the climate that has taken place since the mid-1980s, most glaciers in Iceland began to retreat after 1990, and by 2000 all monitored non-surge type glaciers in Iceland were retreating. An average of 45 non-surging termini were monitored each year by the Icelandic Glaciological Society from 2000 to 2005.

=== Antarctica ===
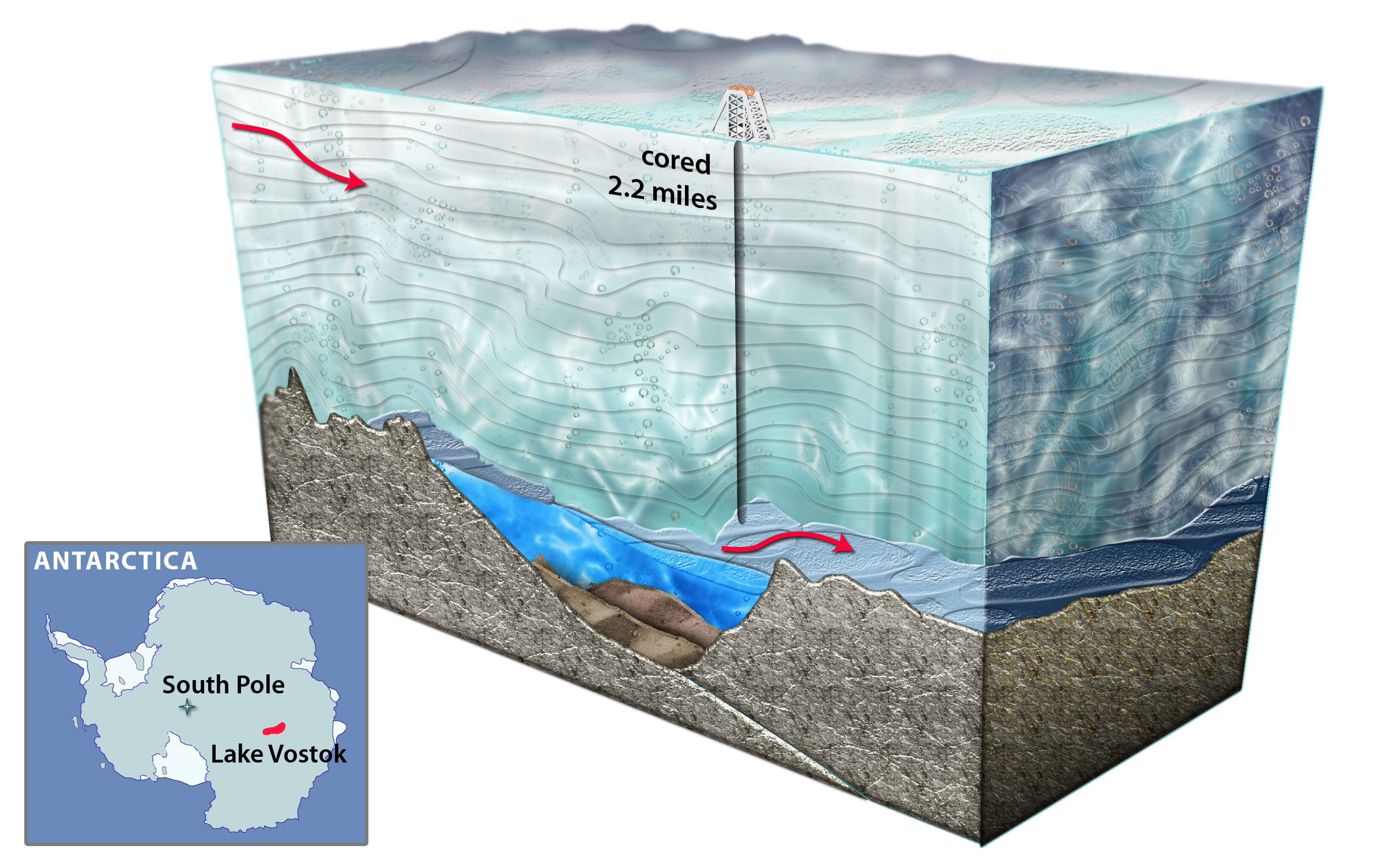
Location and diagram of Lake Vostok, a prominent subglacial lake beneath the East Antarctic Ice Sheet.

The Antarctic ice sheet is the largest known single mass of ice. It covers almost 14 million km^{2} and some 30 million km^{3} of ice. Around 90% of the fresh water on the planet's surface is held in this area and if melted would raise sea levels by 58 metres. The continent-wide average surface temperature trend of Antarctica is positive and significant at >0.05 °C/decade since 1957.

The Antarctic sheet is divided by the Transantarctic Mountains into two unequal sections known as the East Antarctic ice sheet (EAIS) and the smaller West Antarctic Ice Sheet (WAIS). The EAIS rests on a major land mass but the bed of the WAIS is, in places, more than 2,500 metres below sea level. It would be seabed if the ice sheet were not there. The WAIS is classified as a marine-based ice sheet, meaning that its bed lies below sea level and its edges flow into floating ice shelves. The WAIS is bounded by the Ross Ice Shelf, the Ronne Ice Shelf, and outlet glaciers that drain into the Amundsen Sea.

Dakshin Gangotri Glacier, a small outlet glacier of the Antarctic ice sheet, receded at an average rate of 0.7 m (2.3 ft) per year from 1983 to 2002. On the Antarctic Peninsula, which is the only section of Antarctica that extends well north of the Antarctic Circle, there are hundreds of retreating glaciers. In one study of 244 glaciers on the peninsula, 212 have retreated an average of 600 m (2,000 ft) from where they were when first measured in 1953.

Pine Island Glacier is an Antarctic outflow glacier that flows into the Amundsen Sea. A study from 1998 concluded that the glacier thinned 3.5 m (11 ft)± 0.9 m (3.0 ft) per year and retreated a total of 5 km (3.1 mi) in 3.8 years. The terminus of the Pine Island Glacier is a floating ice shelf, and the point at which it starts to float retreated 1.2 km (0.75 mi) per year from 1992 to 1996. This glacier drains a substantial portion of the West Antarctic Ice Sheet.

A study published in 2014 found, rapid grounding line retreat in the years 1992–2011. Based on a study from 2005, the greatest retreat was seen in Sjogren Glacier, which is now 13 km (8.1 mi) further inland than where it was in 1953. There are 32 glaciers that were measured to have advanced; however, these glaciers showed only a modest advance averaging 300 m (980 ft) per glacier, which is significantly smaller than the massive retreat observed.

Thwaites Glacier, which has also shown evidence of thinning, has been referred to as the weak underbelly of the West Antarctic Ice Sheet. A study published in 2014 found rapid grounding line retreat in the years 1992–2011. More recently, new satellite imaging data led to calculations of Thwaites Glacier "ice shelf melt rate of 207 m/year in 2014–2017, which is the highest ice shelf melt rate on record in Antarctica."

Totten Glacier is a large glacier draining a major portion of the East Antarctic Ice Sheet. A study in 2008 concluded that Totten Glacier is currently losing mass. A study published in 2015 concluded that Totten Glacier, has the largest contribution of ice thinning rate on the East Antarctic continent, and that the thinning is driven by enhanced basal melting, because of ocean processes, and affected by polynya activity. Additionally, warm Circumpolar Deep Water, has been observed during summer and winter months at the nearby continental shelf below 400 to 500 meters of cool Antarctic Surface Water.

A 2019 study showed that Antarctica is losing ice six times faster than it was 40 years ago. Another study showed that two glaciers, Pine Island and Thwaites, are melting five times faster than "in the early 1990s".

In February 2020, it was reported from Esperanza Base, the Antarctic Peninsula reached a temperature of 18.3 °C (64.9 °F), the hottest on record to date for continental Antarctica. In the past 50 years, temperatures in the Antarctic Peninsula have surged 5 degrees and about 87% of the glaciers along the peninsula's west coast have retreated.

==== Ice shelves ====
Ice shelves are not stable when surface melting occurs. In the last several decades, glaciologists have observed consistent decreases in ice shelf extent through melt, calving, and complete disintegration of some shelves. Well studied examples include disruptions of the Thwaites Ice Shelf, Larsen Ice Shelf, Filchner–Ronne Ice Shelf (all three in the Antarctic) and the disruption of the Ellesmere Ice Shelf in the Arctic.

== Tropics ==
Tropical glaciers are located between the Tropic of Cancer and the Tropic of Capricorn, in the region that lies 23° 26′ 22″ north or south of the equator. Strictly, a tropical glacier is located within the astronomical tropics; the area where the annual temperature variation is less than the daily variation, and is within the oscillation area of the Intertropical Convergence Zone.

Tropical glaciers are the most uncommon of all glaciers for a variety of reasons. Firstly, the regions are the warmest part of the planet. Secondly, the seasonal change is minimal with temperatures warm year round, resulting in a lack of a colder winter season in which snow and ice can accumulate. Thirdly, few taller mountains exist in these regions upon which enough cold air exists for the establishment of glaciers. Overall, tropical glaciers are smaller than those found elsewhere and are the most likely glaciers to show rapid response to changing climate patterns. A small temperature increase of only a few degrees can have almost immediate and adverse effect on tropical glaciers.

Near the Equator, ice is still found in East Africa, the Andes of South America and New Guinea. The retreat of equatorial glaciers has been documented via maps and photographs covering the period from the late 1800s to nearly the present. 99.64% of tropical glaciers are in Andean mountains of South America, 0.25% on the African glaciers of Rwenzori, Mount Kenya and Kilimanjaro, and 0.11% in the Irian Jaya region in New Guinea.

=== Africa ===
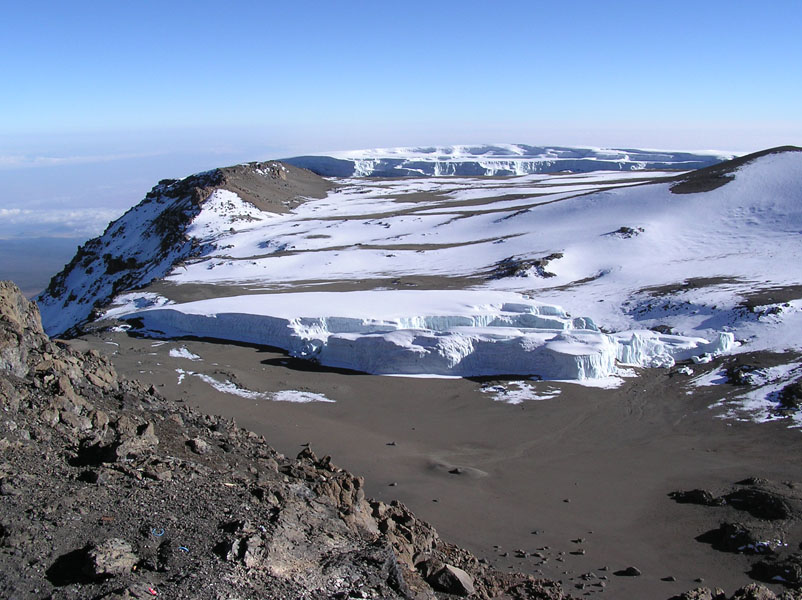
Furtwängler Glacier atop Kilimanjaro in the foreground and snowfields and the Northern Icefields beyond

Almost all Africa is in tropical and subtropical climate zones. Its glaciers are found only in two isolated ranges and the Ruwenzori Range. Kilimanjaro, at 5,895 m (19,341 ft), is the highest peak on the continent. From 1912 to 2006 the glacier cover on the summit of Kilimanjaro apparently retreated 75%, and the volume of glacial ice decreased 80% from its 1912 value due to both retreat and thinning. In the 14-year period from 1984 to 1998, one section of the glacier atop the mountain receded 300 m (980 ft). A 2002 study determined that were conditions to continue, the glaciers atop Kilimanjaro would disappear sometime between 2015 and 2020. Al Gore predicted in 2006 that within the decade there would be no more snows of Kilimanjaro. A March 2005 report indicated that almost no glacial ice remained on the mountain, and the paper noted this as the first time in 11,000 years that barren ground had been exposed on portions of the summit. Researchers reported Kilimanjaro's glacier retreat was due to a combination of increased sublimation and decreased snow fall.

The Furtwängler Glacier is located near the summit of Kilimanjaro. Between 1976 and 2000, the area of Furtwängler Glacier was cut almost in half, from 113,000 m^{2} (1,220,000 ft^{2}) to 60,000 m^{2} (650,000 ft^{2}). During fieldwork conducted early in 2006, scientists discovered a large hole near the center of the glacier. This hole, extending through the 6 m (20 ft) remaining thickness of the glacier to the underlying rock, was expected to grow and split the glacier in two by 2007.

To the north of Kilimanjaro lies Mount Kenya, which at 5,199 m (17,057 ft) is the second tallest mountain on the continent. Mount Kenya has a number of small glaciers that have lost at least 45% of their mass since the middle of the 20th century. According to research compiled by the U.S. Geological Survey (USGS), there were eighteen glaciers atop Mount Kenya in 1900, and by 1986 only eleven remained. The total area covered by glaciers was 1.6 km^{2} (0.62 sq mi) in 1900, however by the year 2000 only about 25%, or 0.4 km^{2} (0.15 sq mi) remained. To the west of Mounts Kilimanjaro and Kenya, the Ruwenzori Range rises to 5,109 m (16,762 ft). Photographic evidence indicates a marked reduction in glacially covered areas over the past century. In the 35-year period between 1955 and 1990, glaciers on the Rwenzori Mountains receded about 40%. It is expected that due to their proximity to the heavy moisture of the Congo region, the glaciers in the Ruwenzori Range may recede at a slower rate than those on Kilimanjaro or in Kenya.

=== South America ===
A study by glaciologists of two small glaciers in South America reveals another retreat. More than 80% of all glacial ice in the northern Andes is concentrated on the highest peaks in small plains of approximately 1 km^{2} (0.39 sq mi) in size. A 1992 to 1998 observation of the Chacaltaya Glacier in Bolivia and Antizana Glacier in Ecuador indicate that between 0.6 m (2.0 ft) and 1.9 m (6.2 ft) of ice was lost per year on each glacier. Figures for Chacaltaya show a loss of 67% of its volume and 40% of its thickness over the same period. Chacaltaya Glacier has lost 90% of its mass since 1940 and was expected to disappear altogether sometime between 2010 and 2015. Antizana is also reported to have lost 40% of its surface area between 1979 and 2007. Research also indicates that since the mid-1980s, the rate of retreat for both of these glaciers has been increasing. In Colombia, the glaciers atop Nevado del Ruiz have lost more than half their area in the last 40 years.

Further south in Peru, the Andes are at a higher altitude overall, and host around 70% of all tropical glaciers. A 1988 glacier inventory based upon data from 1970 estimated, that at that time glaciers covered an area of 2,600 km^{2} (1,000 sq mi). Between 2000 and 2016, 29% of the glacierized area was lost, the remaining area estimated at around 1,300 km^{2} (500 sq mi). The Quelccaya Ice Cap is the second largest tropical icecap in the world after the Coropuna ice cap, and all of the outlet glaciers from the icecap are retreating. In the case of Qori Kalis Glacier, which is one of Quelccayas' outlet glaciers, the rate of retreat had reached 155 m (509 ft) per year during the three-year period of 1995 to 1998. The melting ice has formed a large lake at the front of the glacier since 1983, and bare ground has been exposed for the first time in thousands of years. Rock glaciers show, at various size scales, the preservation of glacier ice below surface-accumulated rock debris that largely prevents the ice from melting.

=== Oceania ===
Animated map of the extent of the glaciers of the Carstensz Range from 1850 to 2003

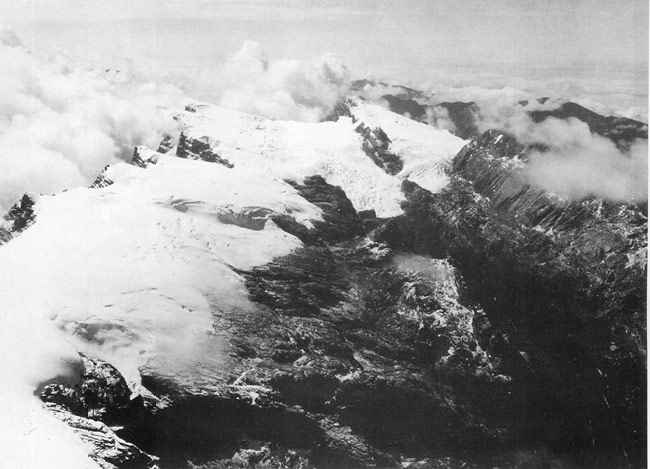
Mount Carstensz icecap 1936 USGS

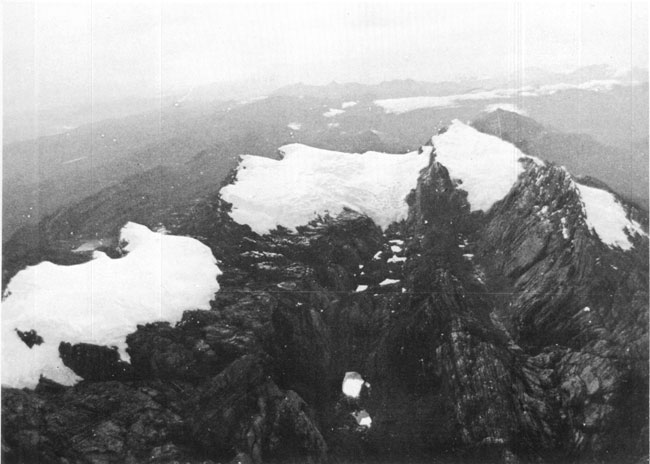
Puncak Jaya glaciers 1972. Left to right: Northwall Firn, Meren Glacier, and Carstensz Glacier. USGS. Also mid-2005 image and animation.

Jan Carstensz's 1623 report of glaciers covering the equatorial mountains of New Guinea was originally met with ridicule, but in the early 20th century at least five subranges of the Maoke Mountains (meaning "Snowy Mountains") were indeed still found to be covered with large ice caps. Due to the location of the island within the tropical zone, there is little to no seasonal variation in temperature. The tropical location has a predictably steady level of rain and snowfall, as well as cloud cover year round, and there has been no noticeable change in the amount of moisture which has fallen during the 20th century.

In 1913, 4,550 m (14,930 ft) high Prins Hendrik peaks (now Puncak Yamin) was named and reported to have "eternal" snow, but this observation was never repeated. The ice cap of 4,720 m (15,490 ft) Wilhelmina Peaks, which reached below 4,400 m (14,400 ft) in 1909, vanished between 1939 and 1963. The Mandala / Juliana ice cap disappeared in the 1990s. and the Idenburg glacier on Ngga Pilimsit dried up in 2003. This leaves only the remnants of the once continuous icecap on New Guinea's highest mountain, Mount Carstensz with the 4,884 m (16,024 ft) high Puncak Jaya summit, which is estimated to have had an area of 20 km^{2} (7.7 sq mi) in 1850.

For this mountain there is photographic evidence of massive glacial retreat since the region was first extensively explored by airplane in 1936 in preparation for the peak's first ascent. Between then and 2010, the mountain lost 80 percent of its ice—two-thirds of which since another scientific expedition in the 1970s. That research between 1973 and 1976 showed glacier retreat for the Meren Glacier of 200 m (660 ft) while the Carstensz Glacier lost 50 m (160 ft). The Northwall Firn, the largest remnant of the icecap that once was atop Puncak Jaya, has itself split into two separate glaciers after 1942. IKONOS satellite imagery of the New Guinean glaciers indicated that by 2002 only 2.1 km^{2} (0.81 sq mi) glacial area remained, that in the two years from 2000 to 2002, the East Northwall Firn had lost 4.5%, the West Northwall Firn 19.4% and the Carstensz 6.8% of their glacial mass, and that sometime between 1994 and 2000, the Meren Glacier had disappeared altogether. An expedition to the remaining glaciers on Puncak Jaya in 2010 discovered that the ice on the glaciers there is about 32 metres (105 ft) thick and thinning at a rate of 7 metres (23 ft) annually. At that rate, the remaining glaciers were expected to last only to the year 2015. A 2019 study predicted their disappearance within a decade.

== Management approaches ==
Reducing greenhouse gas emissions (i.e. climate change mitigation measures) is the only solution that addresses the root cause of glacier retreat since industrialization.

To retard melting of the glaciers some Austrian ski resorts partially covered portions of the Stubai and Pitztal Glaciers with plastic. In Switzerland plastic sheeting is also used to reduce the melt of glacial ice used as ski slopes. While covering glaciers with plastic sheeting may prove advantageous to ski resorts on a small scale, this practice is not expected to be economically practical on a much larger scale.

== See also ==
- Cryosphere – Earth's surface where water is frozen
- List of glaciers
- Permafrost – Type of soil in frozen state
- Post-glacial rebound – Rise of land masses after glacial period
