= Tunsbergdalsbreen =

Glacier in Vestland, Norway

- Interactive map of Tunsbergdalsbreen
- Location: Vestland, Norway
- Coordinates: 61.58214°N 7.13097°E

Tunsbergdalsbreen is a glacier in Luster Municipality in Vestland, Norway. It is a side branch of the Jostedalsbreen glacier, and is included in the Jostedalsbreen National Park.

== See also ==
- List of glaciers in Norway
