= Austerdalsbreen =

Glacier in Vestland, Norway

- Austedalsbreen
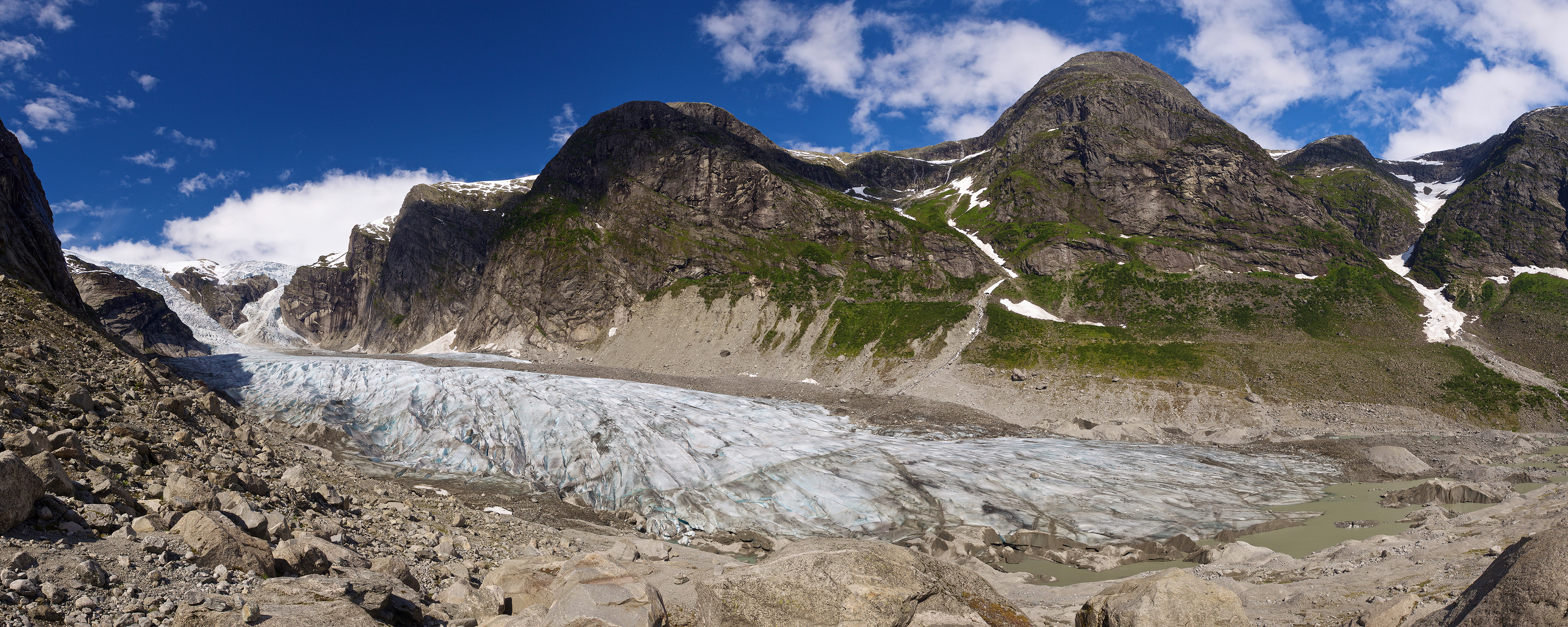
- View of Austerdalsbreen, with Odinsbreen and Torsbreen
- Interactive map of Austerdalsbreen
- Location: Vestland, Norway
- Coordinates: 61.60445°N 6.97226°E

Austerdalsbreen is a glacier in Luster Municipality in Vestland, Norway. It is a side branch of the Jostedalsbreen glacier, and is included in the Jostedalsbreen National Park. The glacier is fed by the three steep glaciers Odinbreen, Torbreen and Lokebreen. The lower, flat part of the glacier displays a characteristic fishbone or lobster tail pattern.

== See also ==
- List of glaciers in Norway
