= Qori Kalis Glacier =

Tropical glacier in Peru

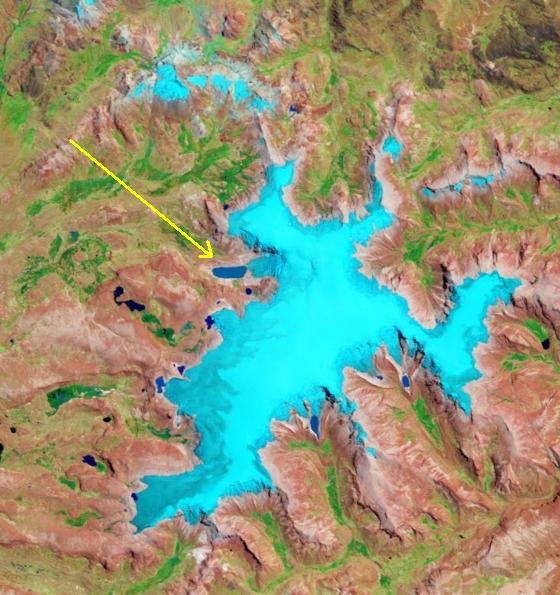
- Quelccaya Ice Cap indicating Qori Kalis Glacier and lake on 2010 25 09

- Location within Peru
- Type: Mountain glacier
- Location: Peru
- Coordinates: 13°54′19″S 70°50′05″W
- Status: Retreating

The Qori Kalis Glacier is a tropical glacier located in the Cordillera Oriental section of the Andes mountains of Peru. It is one of the few tropical glaciers left in the world, and is the main outlet of the Quelccaya Ice Cap.

This glacier has lost nearly half of its length since measurements began in 1963 by the Peruvian hydro-electric company Electroperú. Around 2007, the glacier had been retreating at a rate of 200 feet per year.

From 1963 to 1978 it retreated at a rate of approximately 6 metres per year. Between 1991 and 2005, it has retreated at around 60 metres per year. It is the largest of all of the tongues of the Quelccaya Ice Cap, many of which are in retreat.

Testing shows that the Qori Kalis Glacier advanced to its greatest length around 520 years ago and then began to retreat. It has advanced to small degrees from time to time since then.

== Lake ==
Qori Kalis Glacier at left centre in this 1975-2000 Landsat false-colour animation

Beginning in 1991, a proglacial lake started to form where the glacier once existed. The lake is extremely deep, and is contained in a natural valley which acts as a dam. In 2004, the lake had reached a depth of 80 meters.

In March 2006, a large portion of the glacier detached and fell into the lake. This resulted in a large wave of water surging into the valley below. The risk of such events are monitored because of the risk of flash flooding towns and even cities below.
