= Khunurana =

Khunurana (Aymara for a variety of potato) or Cunorana, Cunurana, Jonorana, or Kunurana, may refer to the following mountains:

- Khunurana (Bolivia)
- Cunorana (Carabaya), Peru
- Jonorana (Carabaya-Melgar), Peru
- Cunurana (Melgar), Peru
