= Kjenndalsbreen =

Glacier in Vestland, Norway

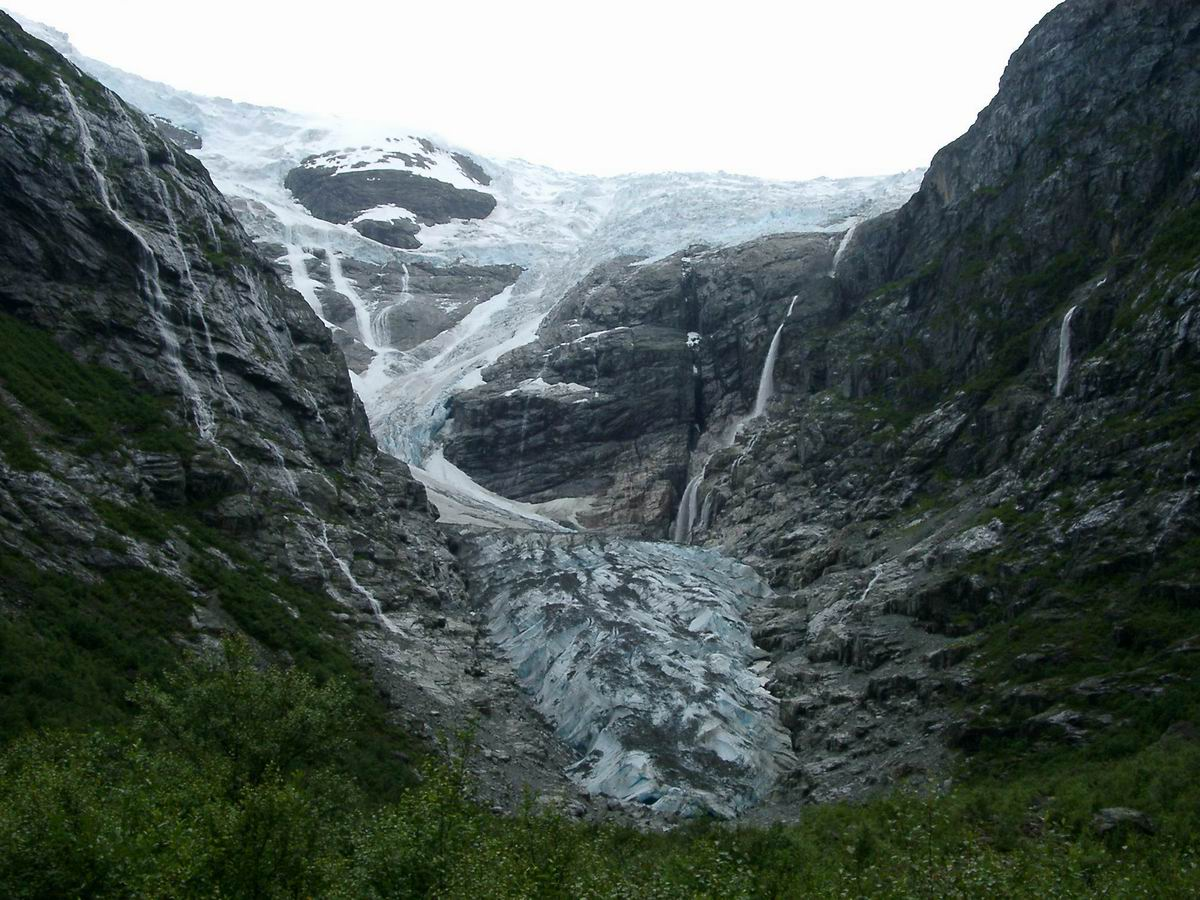
- Interactive map of the glacier
- Location: Vestland, Norway
- Coordinates: 61.71783°N 7.02615°E
- Area: 19 km^{2} (7.3 sq mi)

Kjenndalsbreen is a glacier in Stryn Municipality in Vestland county, Norway. The 19-square-kilometre (7.3 sq mi) glacier is a side branch of the Jostedalsbreen glacier, and is included in the Jostedalsbreen National Park.

== See also ==
- List of glaciers in Norway
