= Jostedal Glacier =

Largest glacier in continental Europe

- Jostedalsbreen
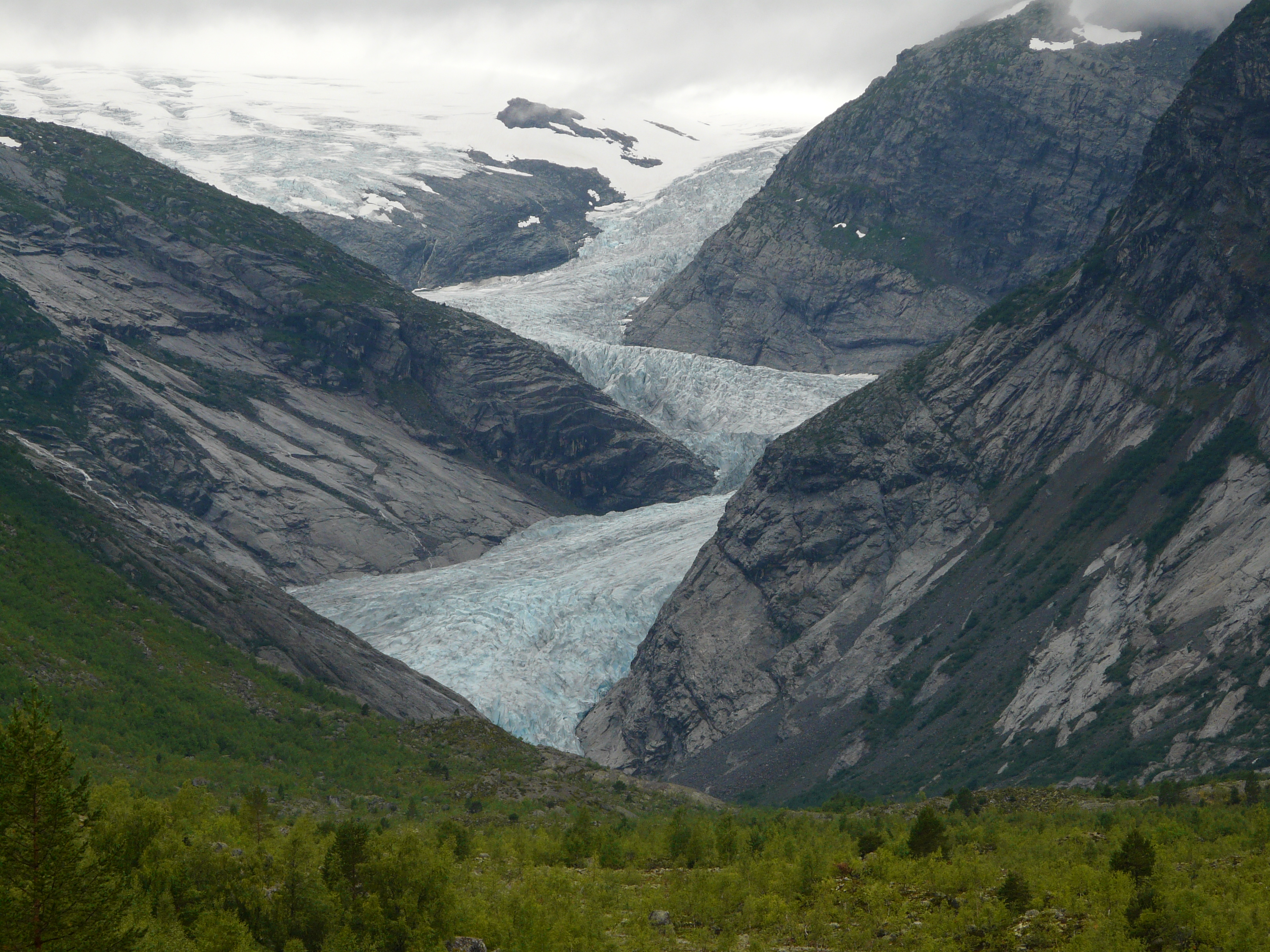
- View of the Jostedalsbreen glacier
- Interactive map of the glacier
- Type: Mountain glacier
- Location: Vestland, Norway
- Coordinates: 61°42′38″N 06°55′27″E
- Area: 487 km^{2} (188 sq mi)
- Length: 60 km (37 mi)
- Thickness: 600 m (2,000 ft)

Jostedal Glacier or Jostedalsbreen (Norwegian) is the largest glacier in continental Europe. It is in Vestland county in Western Norway. Jostedalsbreen is located in the municipalities of Luster, Sogndal, Sunnfjord, and Stryn (all in Vestland county), plus the northeastern tip of the glacier extends into Skjåk Municipality (in Innlandet county). The highest peak in the area is Lodalskåpa at a height of 2,083 metres (6,834 ft).

== History ==
In 1906, work was being done on footpaths that could accommodate tourists.

The glacial water is also used in distilling Vikingfjord.

== Geography ==
The Jostedal Glacier has a total area of 487 square kilometres (188 sq mi). The highest point is Høgste Breakulen at 1,957 metres (6,421 ft) above mean sea level. Branches of the glacier reach down into the valleys, for instance Bøyabreen in Fjærland and Nigardsbreen, both at 300 metres (980 ft) above sea level. The thickest part of the glacier is 600 metres (2,000 ft). Jostedalsbreen has a length of a little more than 60 kilometres (37 mi) and it is a part of the 1,310-square-kilometre (510 sq mi) Jostedalsbreen National Park, which was established in 1991. The glacier covers over half of the national park.

The glacier is maintained by the high snowfall rates in the region, not the cold temperatures. This means the glacier has high melting rates in its snouts. The Jostedalsbreen has around 50 glacier arms such as the Nigardsbreen and Tunsbergdalsbreen in Jostedalen, the Briksdalsbreen near Olden, the Bøyabreen by Fjærland, the Kjenndalsbreen, Tindefjellbreen near Loen, and Austerdalsbreen.

In 2012, the glacier arm Briksdalsbreen lost 50 metres (160 ft) of ice in a few months. More recent measurements now show that Briksdalsbreen retreated 146 metres (479 ft) in 2006, and could be in danger of breaking away from the upper icefield. Ice climbing has now been terminated because of this event.

== See also ==
- List of glaciers
- List of glaciers in Norway
- Vikingfjord
