= Cordillera Oriental (Peru) =

Mountain range in the Peruvian Andes

- Eastern Cordillera of Peru
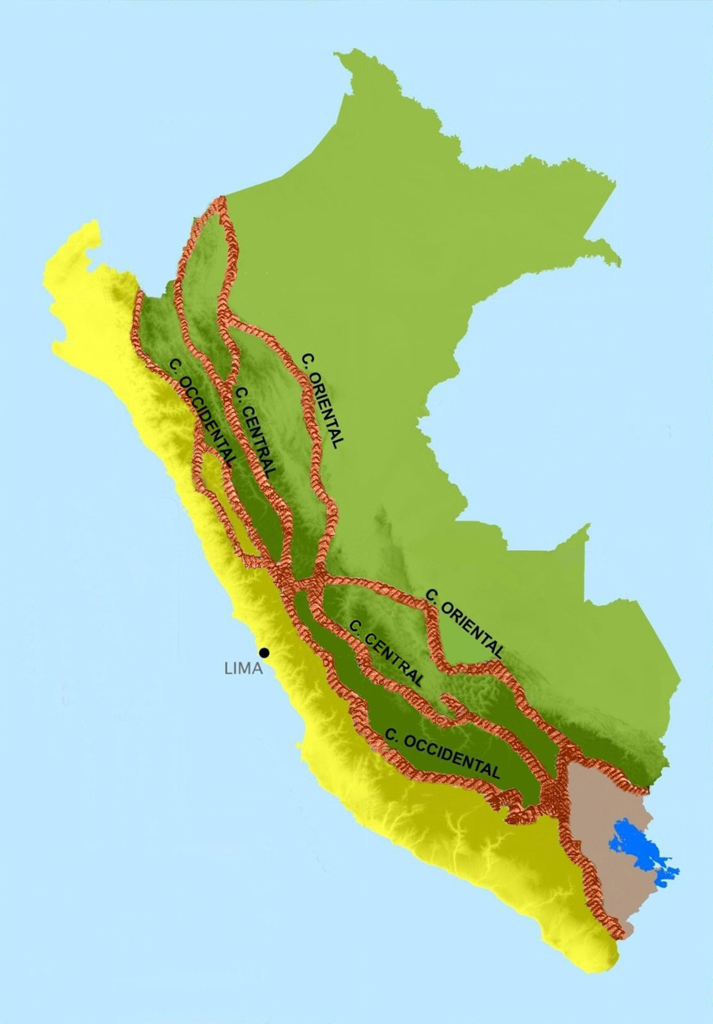
- Map of Peru and its cordilleras.

Highest point
- Peak: Ausangate, 13°47′S 71°13′W
- Elevation: 6,384 m (20,945 ft)

Dimensions
- Length: 1,000 km (620 mi) approx.
- Width: 100 km (62 mi) approx.

Geography
- Location within Peru
- Location: Peru
- Parent range: Andes

Geology
- Orogeny: Andean orogeny
- Rock age: Paleozoic to Cenozoic

The Cordillera Oriental is a mountain range (cordillera) that forms the eastern branch of the Andes in Peru. It contains Paleozoic metamorphic rocks and runs through the entire country, from the Ecuadorian border in the north to the Bolivian border in the south. It has an approximate length of 1,800 km and is located along the edge of the Peruvian Amazon. The range crosses the departments of Amazonas, Loreto, San Martín, Huánuco, Ucayali, Pasco, Junín, Cusco, Madre de Dios, and Puno.

It includes many subsidiary ranges such as the Vilcanota, Vilcabamba, Urubamba and Carabaya mountain ranges and peaks above 6,000 m such as Salcantay.

The highest peak is Nevado Ausangate at 6372 m.

== See also ==
- Cordillera Central (Peru)
