= Pampaqucha (disambiguation) =

Pampaqucha (Quechua: pampa a large plain, qucha lake, "plain lake", also spelled Pampa Cocha, Pampa Khocha, Pampaccocha, Pampacocha, Pampajocha) may refer to:

- Pampaqucha (Ancash), a lake in the Ancash Region, Peru
- Pampaqucha (Ayacucho), a lake in the Ayacucho Region, Peru
- Pampaqucha (Puno), a lake in the Ayacucho Region, Peru
