= Kallanka =

Incan building type

A kallanka is a typical building of the Inca architecture consisting of an elongated rectangular single room building hall with a gabled thatched roof. In the wider buildings the roof is supported by one or more rows of columns along the major axis. The short sides have gables to support the roof. The entrance is normally through one of the longer sides having equally spaced doors, the opposite side has niches facing the inside or windows but no doors. Kallankas are normally placed on the haukaypatas (main squares) of the Inca settlements with their doors opening to the plaza.

Kallankas were built by the government of the Inca Empire for collective, administrative, religious and military uses. The Inca roads had way station generally referred to as tambos where these great halls were used as temporary quarters for passing soldiers and workers under the mit'a service −a mandatory tribute to the Inca in the form of labor.

In Cusco, Peru and in some other Inca state settlements, kallankas were very large and, according to some chroniclers, they were used for festivals and ceremonies in bad weather.

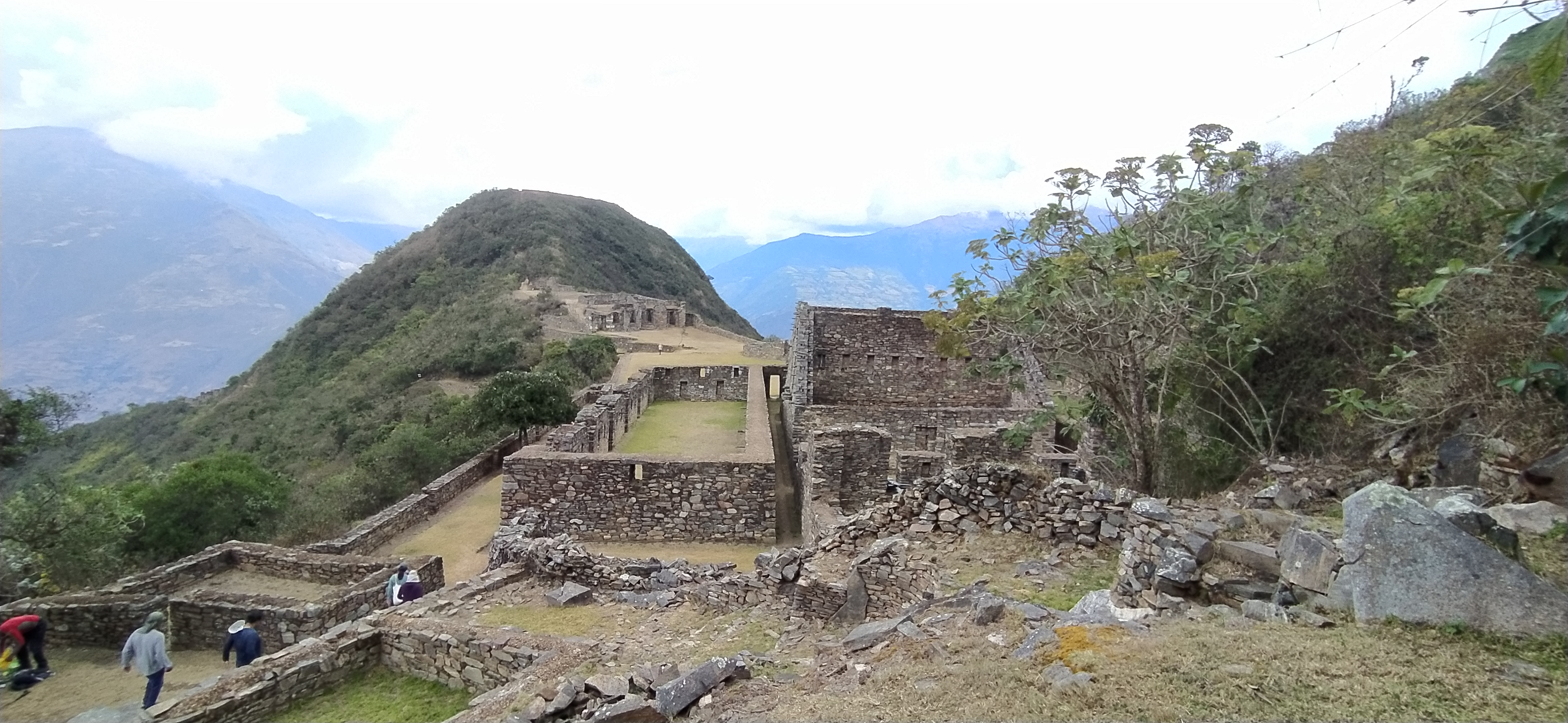
A kallanka in Choquequirao

Kallankas were the largest Inca buildings with a length up to 105 metres (344 ft) and width up to 26 metres (85 ft). All kallankas had imposing thatched roofs. Considering the average gable angle to be between 55° and 60°, the roof height could exceed 10 metres (33 ft) in the case of the widest ones, thus taking up «most of the visual experience of the building, as well as a considerable part of the construction effort»

No kallanka is nowadays fully extant, but ruins are found in many archaeological sites and have been the object of excavation and publication.

== Function of the kallankas ==
… In many Inka houses, there were great halls [kallankas] measuring two hundred paces in length and fifty to sixty paces in width; each hall was one undivided open space where they held their festivals and dances when rainy weather did not allow them to celebrate in the plaza outside. In the city of Cozco [Cusco], I counted four such halls which were still standing when I was a boy.

— Inca Garcilaso de la Vega

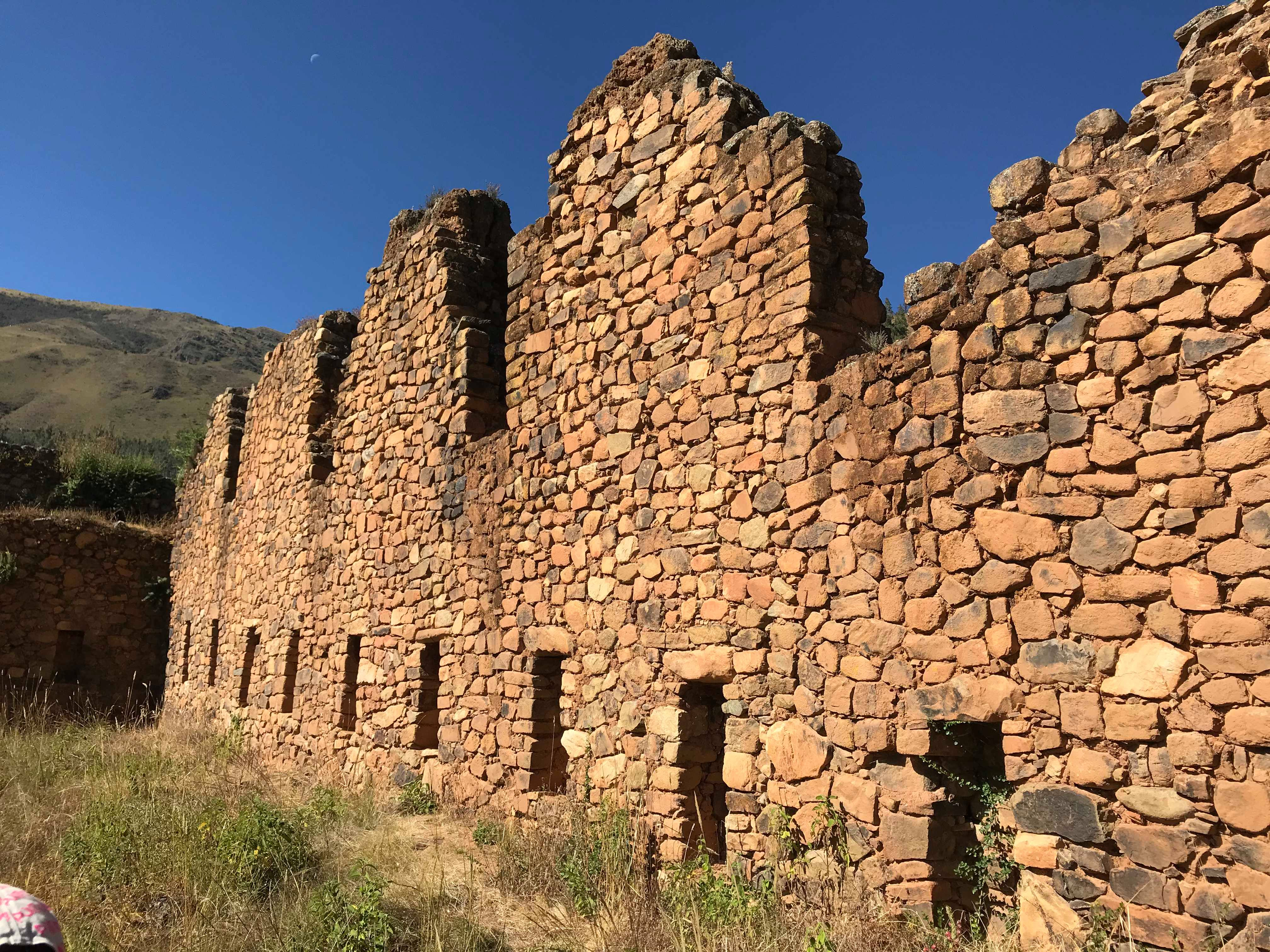
Incallaqta (Bolivia) – side gabled wall of the kallanka showing niches and windows.

Kallankas are found practically in every Inca state settlement. Nevertheless, they appear more insistently in the populated centers along the Inca road system, that is where large masses of armies or people carrying out the mit'a (forced labor) were in movement and needed shelter and temporary supplies. Cusco, the capital of the Inca empire, had at least four kallankas facing its main square −named haukaypata (also spelled hawkaypata) or square of the rest and happiness –where the main festivals and celebrations were held.

There is still scarce published information regarding the archaeological findings made inside kallankas, but sherds and animal remains are the most recurrently reported materials. The multifunctional use of kallankas is supported by the discovery of weapons (bolas, sling projectiles) and human remains. Cusco was considered a sacred city where many ceremonies were held. It is possible that Inca Garcilaso de la Vega was correct in stating that the kallankas were areas for the festivals in case of rain. However, Santacruz Pachacuti Yamqui, referring to the building called Cuyusmanco in Cusco (the same one that Garcilaso refers to as the first cathedral), says that it was «a house of court and council».

In the territories conquered by the Incas other uses may be assumed. In important administrative centers, the kallankas facing the haukaypata had probably more than one function. They could serve as well as a covered space to celebrate festivities on rainy days or in he case of the visit of a high official, the celebration of a religious ceremony or the passage of a triumphant army, but it is more likely that they served as temporary accommodation for human groups in transit, soldiers or mitimaes, people fulfilling the forced labor mit'a service. This is confirmed by the archaeological excavations carried out by Edward Craig Morris and colleagues in the kallankas of Huánuco Pampa that showed there was no continuous occupation of them. Morris was one of the archaeologists working for the Institute of Andean Research, directed by John Victor Murra, who excavated the site. A good definition for the use of the kallankas is given by Cristóbal de Molina «el Almagrista» who, speaking of army displacements, states «… they settled in the town they arrived in, in large sheds and large houses that were made for the purpose, some of which were one hundred and fifty paces long, very wide and spacious, each one could accommodate a large number of people, very well covered, clean and furnished, with many doors, so that they were clear and pleasant …» This also confirms that the kallankas were planned buildings in the administrative centers and in the tambos along the Inca road system.

The following table summarizes different functions attributed to the kallankas by Spanish chroniclers and scholars.

Function of the kallanka	Author / references
Palaces of the Inca king or other important persons.	Sergio Barraza
Barracks or shelters for the Inca soldiers.	John Hyslop
Covered plazas «for their parties and dances» when weather conditions did not allow outdoor gatherings.	Inca Garcilaso de la Vega
Workshops and/or accommodation for tributaries of the mit'a system.	John Hislop
Temporary collective accommodation for transients, such as pilgrims going to sanctuaries.	Santiago Agurto
Places of public meeting or assembly.	Ramiro Matos
Temples.	Polo de Ondegardo
Collective use, multiple purposes. Kallankas «had to be adapted to different situations and purposes».	Gasparini & Margolies
Court of justice and town hall.	Juan de Santa Cruz Pachacuti Yamqui Salcamaygua

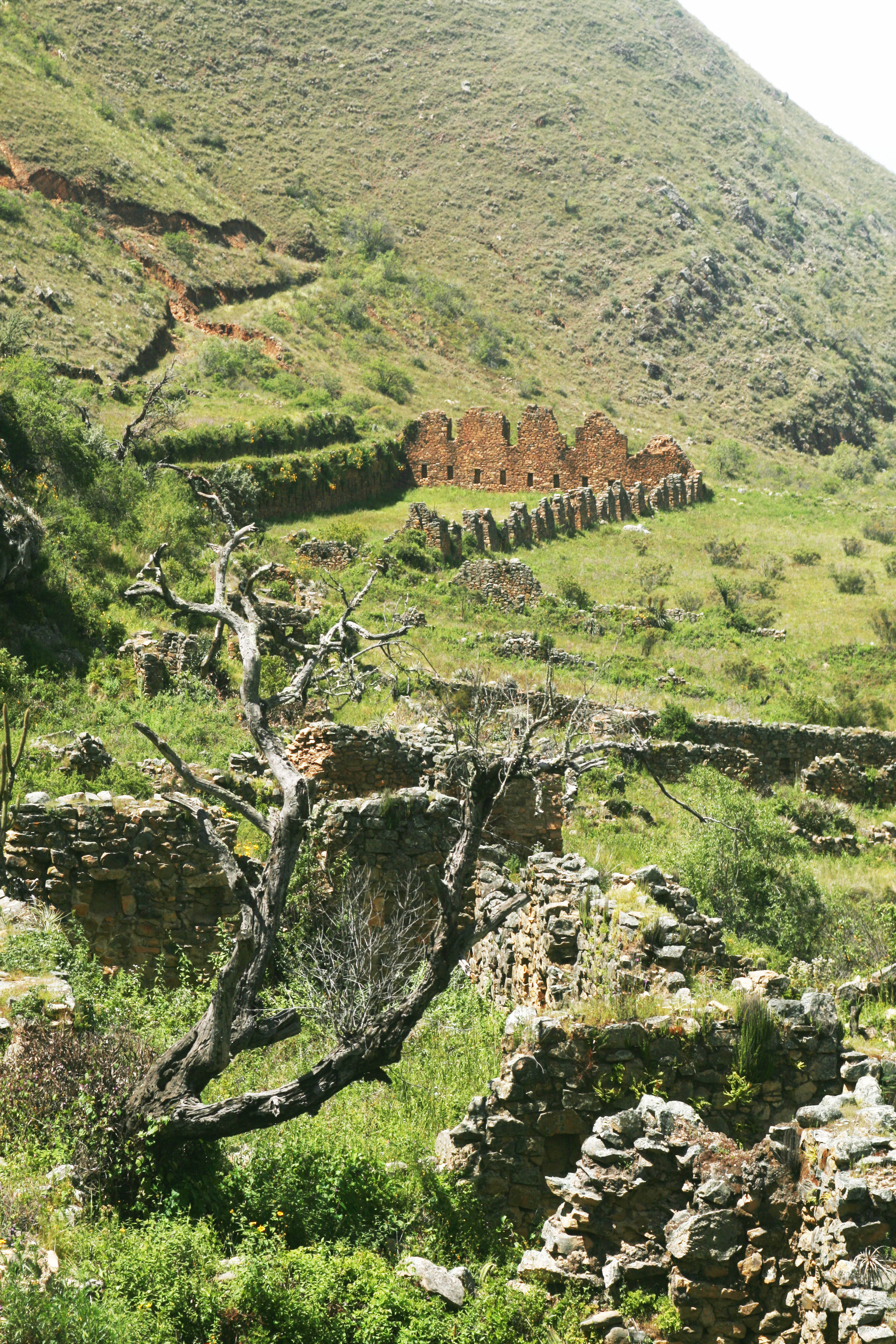
View of Inkallaqta (Bolivia) with the kallanka on the back, one of the largest of the Inca empire. The wall on the right hand side had doors facing the plaza

== Architectural details ==
=== Size ===
… no one has yet defined how large a rectangular Inka building must be to be called a kallanka.

— John Hyslop "Inka Settlement Planning", 1990

The size of the Inca buildings is almost infinite. For example, in Machu Picchu the Inca citadel in the roundabouts of Cusco, the smallest room is 3 by 4 metres (9.8 by 13.1 ft) while the largest building, a kallanka, was 47.5 by 6.5 metres (156 by 21 ft). In terms of area the biggest one was 22 times larger than the smallest one. For this reason a minimum size of 40 metres (130 ft) for kallankas has been proposed, but if this criterion is applied only ten Inca building would be classified as kallanka (see table below). The largest kallanka of the Inca Empire has an area of 2,323 m^{2} (25,000 sq ft): its sides are 92 by 25.5 metres (302 by 84 ft). and it is the largest building of the so-called Temple of Wiracocha, in the archaeological site of Raqch'i (department of Cusco, Peru). Another kallanka of exceptional dimensions is the one found at the Inkallaqta monumental complex in Bolivia. This structure is 78 by 26 metres (256 by 85 ft) with an area of 2,028 square metres (21,830 sq ft).

In several Inca settlements one side of the haukaypata has two kallankas with little separation between them. There are cases in which there is just one kallanka on one side of the plaza, it is possible to interpret this fact as a hierarchical distinction between administrative centers of regional importance and local tambos that the Inca government built along the Inca road system. Cajamarca was an important center which hosted at least two kallankas on one side of its “immense” plaza. Francisco Pizarro mentions two sheds in which he stayed with his troops when they arrived in the city on November 15, 1532, the day before the battle of Cajamarca where Pizarro's less than 200 troops killed most of Atahualpa's 6,000 men garrison and took the Inca emperor captive. The Shincal de Quimivil Inca settlement in Northwestern Argentina had five kallankas, four of then bordering the haukaypata and one, the biggest, inside it, on the southern side.

=== Table of kallanka size ===
The following table gives the size of the 20 largest kallankas of the Tawantinsuyu, sorted by decreasing area. it has been adapted form Agurto's "Estudios acerca de la construcción, arquitectura y planeamiento incas" (Studies about the Inca construction, architecture and planning).

Site Name (Department, Country)	Area	Length	Width)
Temple of Wiracocha in Raqch'i (Cusco, Peru)	2,323 m^{2} (25,000 sq ft)	92 m (302 ft)	25.3 m (83 ft)
Inkallaqta (Bolivia)	2,028 m^{2} (21,830 sq ft)	78 m (256 ft)	26 m (85 ft)
El Fuerte de Samaipata (Bolivia)	1,088 m^{2} (11,710 sq ft)	68 m (223 ft)	16 m (52 ft)
Pumpu (Junín, Peru)	997.5 m^{2} (10,737 sq ft)	105 m (344 ft)	9.5 m (31 ft)
Huánuco Pampa (Huánuco, Peru)	780 m^{2} (8,400 sq ft)	65 m (213 ft)	12 m (39 ft)
Shincal de Quimivil (Catamarca, Argentina)	517 m^{2} (5,560 sq ft)	47 m (154 ft)	11 m (36 ft)
Ccopan (Arequipa, Peru)	515 m^{2} (5,540 sq ft)	51.5 m (169 ft)	10 m (33 ft)
Huchuy Qosqo (Cusco, Peru)	480 m^{2} (5,200 sq ft)	40 m (130 ft)	12 m (39 ft)
Machu Pitumarka (Cusco, Peru)	456.3 m^{2} (4,912 sq ft)	49.6 m (163 ft)	9.2 m (30 ft)
Tambokancha (Cusco, Peru)	423.2 m^{2} (4,555 sq ft)	29.8 m (98 ft)	14.2 m (47 ft)
Achaymarca (Arequipa, Peru)	416.6 m^{2} (4,484 sq ft)	39.3 m (129 ft)	10.6 m (35 ft)
La Joya (Arequipa, Peru)	347.6 m^{2} (3,742 sq ft)	30.9 m (101 ft)	11.3 m (37 ft)
Ccopan (Arequipa)	294 m^{2} (3,160 sq ft)	25.9 m (85 ft)	11.4 m (37 ft)
Pumpu (Junín, Peru)	292.5 m^{2} (3,148 sq ft)	45 m (148 ft)	6.5 m (21 ft)
Sondor (Apurímac, Peru)	270 m^{2} (2,900 sq ft)	27 m (89 ft)	10 m (33 ft)
Ccopan (Arequipa, Peru)	248.7 m^{2} (2,677 sq ft)	21.8 m (72 ft)	11.4 m (37 ft)
Choquequirao (Apurímac, Peru)	247.5 m^{2} (2,664 sq ft)	33 m (108 ft)	7.5 m (25 ft)
La Joya (Arequipa, Peru)	243.2 m^{2} (2,618 sq ft)	25.6 m (84 ft)	9.5 m (31 ft)
Ccopan (Arequipa, Peru)	234.9 m^{2} (2,528 sq ft)	26.1 m (86 ft)	9 m (30 ft)
Maucallacta (Arequipa, Peru)	230 m^{2} (2,500 sq ft)	23 m (75 ft)	10 m (33 ft)

Moreover, Garcilaso states that «there were very large sheds [kallankas] up to two hundred paces in length and fifty to sixty steps wide» (130 metres (430 ft) by 32.5 to 39 metres (107 to 128 ft)).

=== Columns and roofs ===
In small Inca houses, the ridge beam of the roof –usually a log– rested its ends on the vertex of the two opposite gables; in the longer rooms, where it was not possible to bridge the distance between the gables with a single wooden beam, wooden pillars were used to support the series of ridge beams and the entire roof. This procedure was very common in the kallankas. On the outer side of the gables, protruding cylindrical stones like stone nails were frequently found to tie and hold the roof.

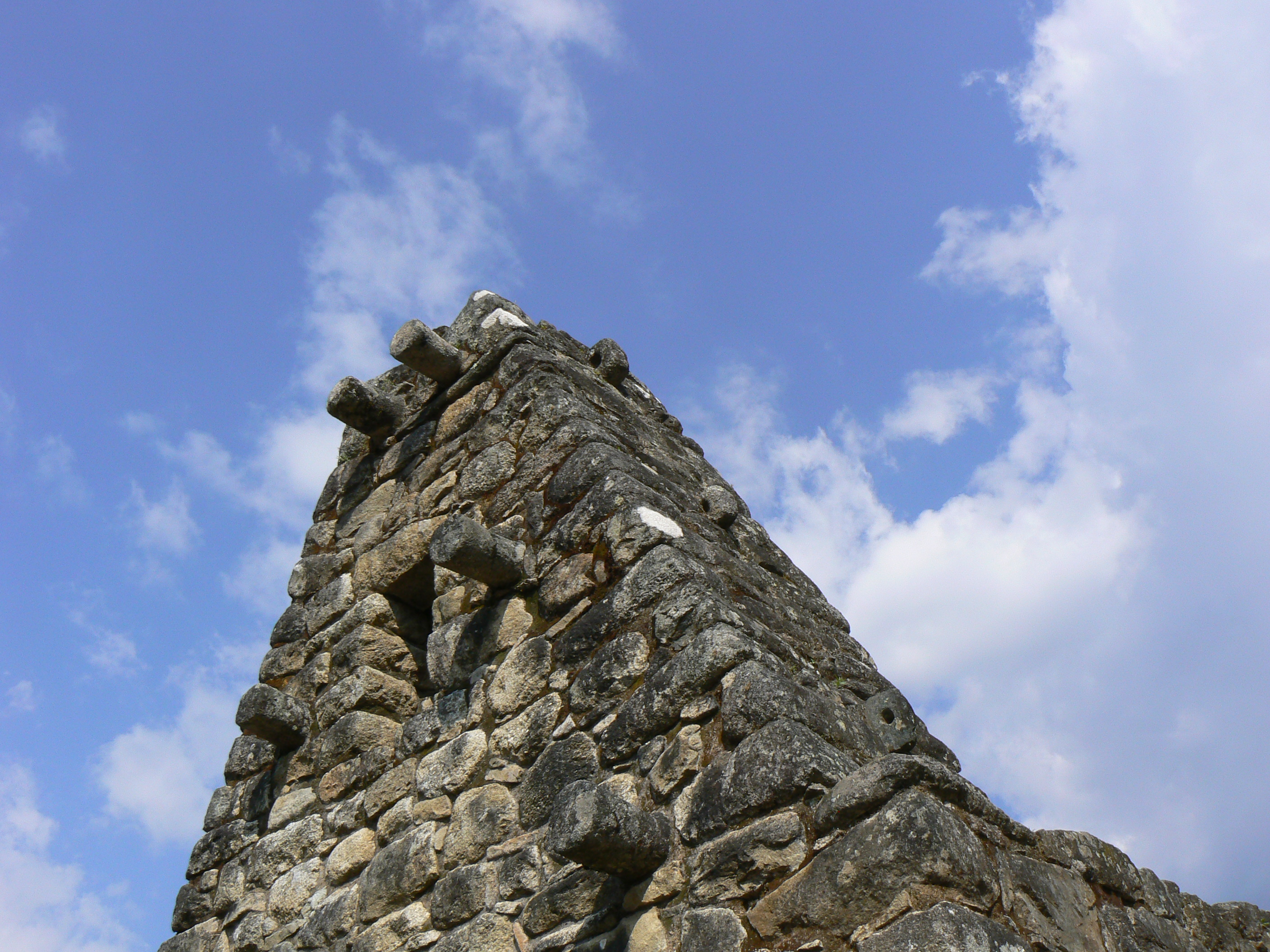
Gable top of a house in Machu Picchu showing the stone nails

In bigger kallankas more than one row of pillars was used. The biggest kallanka, the Temple of Wiracocha had a longitudinal central wall having a height of about 12 metres (39 ft) and a thickness of 1.65 metres (5.4 ft). The lower part was made of fine cut stone while the upper part was adobe. This wall divided the temple into two separate rooms which were connected through 10 openings in the wall. Each of the two halves had a longitudinal row of 11 pillars with a height of about 6 metres (20 ft). They supported a series of wooden beam which in turn supported the roof.

The roof gables were such as to provide the necessary steepness to the thatch in order to allow it to stand rainwater. Thatched roof could have a pitch (angle to the ground) between 45 and 80 degrees. At lower pitches the rainwater cannot freely run while the thatch retains moisture and can easily deteriorate. The thickness of the thatch was commonly more than one meter. Inca roofs in Cusco were so thick that when the Incas burned their capital during Manco Inca Yupanqui's rebellion against the Conquistadors in 1536, the roof of one of the kallankas took eight days to burn until the wooden structure fell.

In practice the visible area of the façade of a typical Inca building was mainly composed of its thatched roof. The wider the building the taller was the roof and its imposing presence on the façade.

== Origin of the name ==
The word "kallanka" to define the big halls of the Inca architecture is of a recent origin. It was first introduced by Edward Craig Morris who used it to describe this type of construction in the framework of its studies in Huánuco Pampa since in 1963.

The name given to kallankas by the early Spaniards was sala (room, hall) or galpón (plural galpones, meaning shed, hall) which in turn is not a term of Spanish origin nor of any of the Andean languages. The term "galpón" was introduced by the early Conquistadors and recorded for the first time during the foundation of the new colonial Cusco in 1534. According to the Real Academia Española (Royal Spanish Academy of the Spanish language) the origin of this term is derived from the Nahuatl language name calpúlli meaning big house.

In modern Quechua dictionaries, the word kallanka is interpreted as "building stone" nevertheless its derivatives are found in the Quechua vocabulary of Diego González Holguín printed in 1608, where kallankarumi and kallancawasi are interpreted, respectively, as "large carved stones, masonry for foundations and thresholds" and "house founded on them". these definition are not relevant to define the large halls, but the Aymara vocabulary by Ludovico Bertonio, records the word "callanca" with the meaning of corral with a strong ceremonial character. Kallankas were also part of the Inca royal palaces, such as the Amarucancha (enclosure of the snakes) in Cusco (see map below) and some chroniclers used the word galpón to refer to the large halls in these compounds. The name used by the Incas to refer to the kallanka could have been tambo. This is somehow confirmed by the soldier and chronicler Pedro Cieza de León who refers to «the tambos or royal palaces, among which there are two [that are] twenty-two feet wide, and as long as a horse race, all made of stone, and their ornamentation of tall and thick beams; placed on the most high [is] the straw that they use with great order…». Nowadays the word tambo refers to the way stations found at one day's walk of each other all along the Qhapaq ñan.

== Notable kallankas ==
=== The Casana in Cusco ===
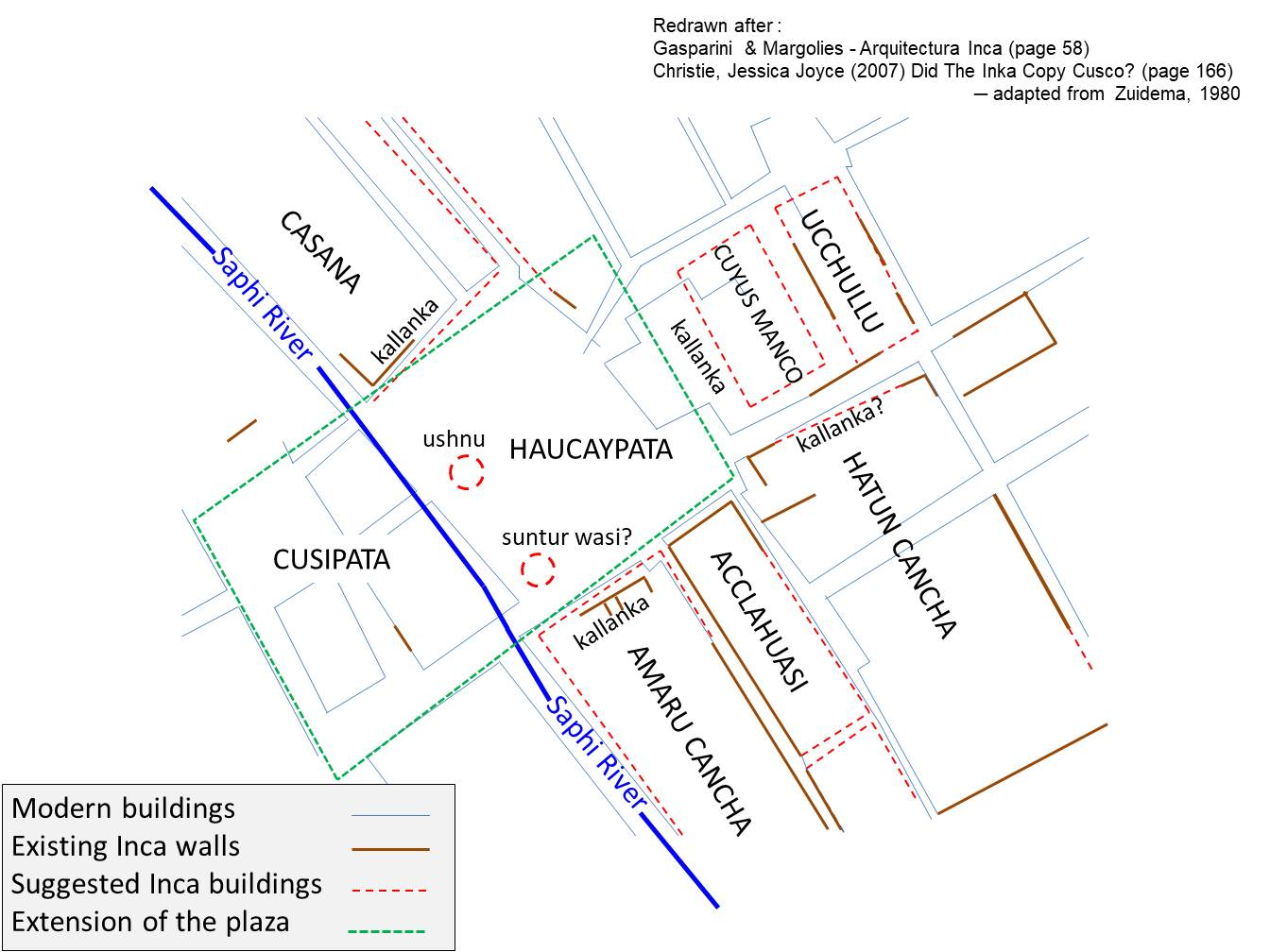
Cusco main plaza (hauycaypata) at Inca times with the location of Casana along the Saphi river (top left)

The Casana compound was originally the royal palace of Pachakuti facing the haucaypata (main square) in Cusco. It stood at its northwest corner, beside the Saphy river and close to another compound known as Coracora. The huge hall (kallanka) of the Casana according to Garcilaso could host up to 3,000 peoples. When Cusco was conquered the Casana became the first Franciscan convent, nowadays the remains of the walls of the Casana are still extant under the portico of a restaurant.

=== Temple of Wirakocha ===
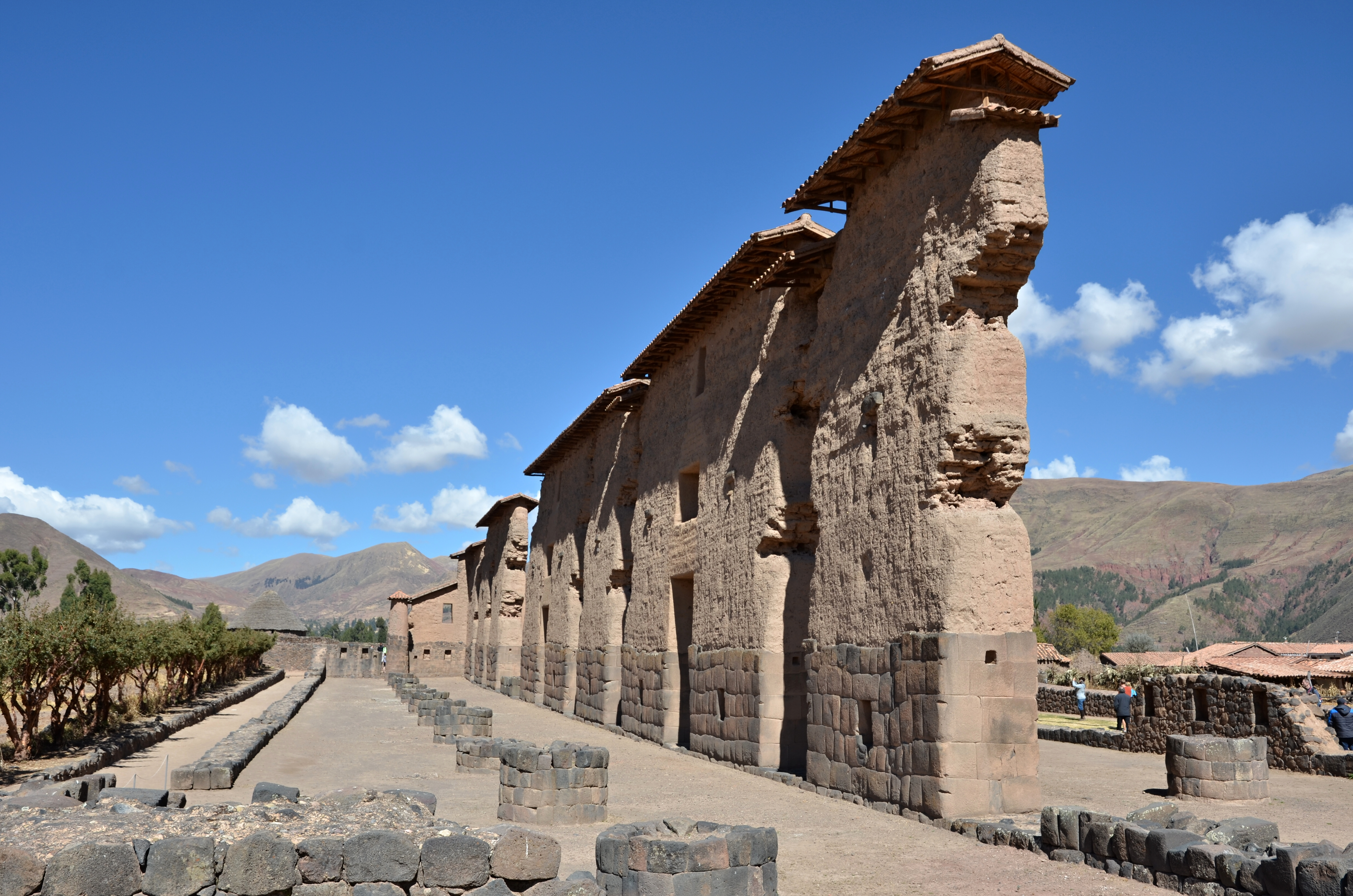
The Kallanka/Temple of Wirakocha in Raqch'i, Peru. Detail of the column bases, the only extant column and the central wall. Notice that the entrance corresponds to the alignment of the columns

The large interior space is divided by a wall approximately 12 meters high, along the entire longitudinal axis. To allow a connection from one side to the other, ten "doors" were opened at the base. Between one opening and another, there is a niche about 70 centimetres (28 in) high that crosses the whole 1.65 metres (5.4 ft) thick wall. The base of this wall is made of finely carved stone, up to a height of bout 2.80 metres (9.2 ft). On top of the stones an adobe structure is built up to the ridge of the roof.

Each of the two halves formed by the longitudinal wall had a series of eleven columns on its longitudinal axis obtaining a temple divided into four naves. The columns were cylindrical which is an exception among the Inca buildings since all the known supports in the form of pillars have a quadrangular section. Of the 22 columns only one remains; it is made of stone up to 3.30 metres (10.8 ft), then adobe. The total height is approximately 6 metres (20 ft). The entrances to the temple are placed on one the short sides, this is uncommon for kallankas, moreover the two rows of eleven columns are on the axis that coincides with the entrance doors, thus providing an unusual experience entering the temple, since the view is impeded by the thick volume of the supports instead of the huge temple volume.

=== Inkallaqta ===
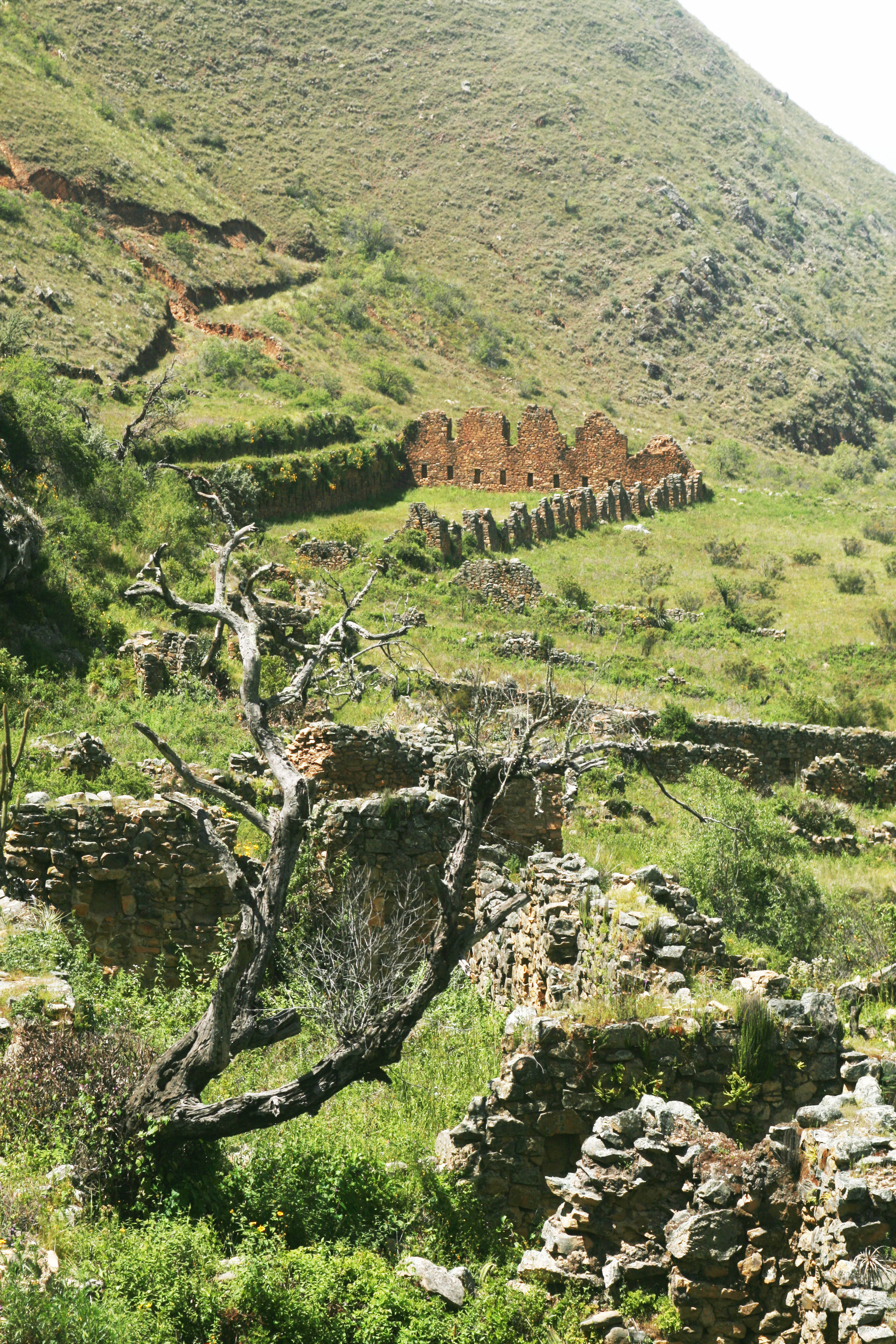
Inkallaqta - Note the kallanka in the background

The Kallanka in Inkallaqta, east of Cochabamba in Bolivia is 78 by 26 metres (256 by 85 ft). With a surface of 2,028 m^{2} (21,830 sq ft) ranks second by area after the Temple of Wirakocha.

The wall facing the plaza has 12 narrow doors each 78 centimetres (31 in) wide. Between one door and the other there are 13 windows, ech 40 centimetres (16 in) wide. Between the sixth and seventh doors there are rests of a small stepped platform which could have been an ushnu. The wall opposite to the façade is taller with a retaining wall function and has a long sequence of 44 niches. The niches are not trapezoidal, but rather rectangular, which is quite uncommon for an Inca building.

Only one of the short sides of the rectangular building preserves remains of the gable; It has 10 niches at the bottom and four large windows above. The triangular finishing of the gables was made of adobe blocks. The reconstructive study of the roof does not allow to assume that this kallanka had a single row of wooden supports along the longitudinal axis, as in the case of Huánuco Pampa, but the calculation for each of the two slopes of the roof provides a length of more than 16 metres (52 ft); quite a long span to overcome with one-piece logs. Following the example of the temple of Wirakocha it is possible that this kallankas could have four naves.

=== Huánuco Pampa ===
Huánuco Pampa archaeological investigations started in the 1960s by the Institute of Andean Research under the direction of the US archaeologist Edward Craig Morris. The huge central plaza (550 by 350 metres (1,800 by 1,150 ft)) is bordered by several kallankas, two of them can be mentioned.

The first one (on the north side of the plaza) is 65 by 12 metres (213 by 39 ft) in size. On the side facing the plaza nine doors are found and another door is found on one the short sides. On the wall opposite to the one with nine doors, ten windows are placed. Along the centerline of the building seven stone circles were found which were most probably the foundations of pillars that supported the roof beams. The pillars were most probably wooden, in practice tree trunks as tall as 8 metres (26 ft), since the circles are too small to include stone pillars of such a height.

The second kallanka (on the south side of the plaza) was only cleaned of vegetation and debris without reaching the original floor. It is very similar to the first one but somewhat shorter. One uncommon feature is that its side facing the square has four doors alternated with five windows. It is very difficult to establish if the smaller number of doors determined a different function.

== See also ==
- Inca architecture
- Tambo
- Inca road system
- Chinchero
- Raqch'i
- Inkallaqta
