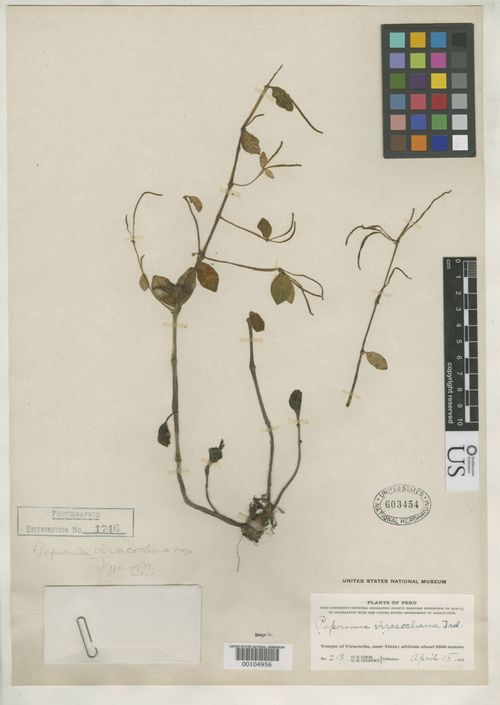

Scientific classification
- Kingdom: Plantae
- Clade: Embryophytes
- Clade: Tracheophytes
- Clade: Angiosperms
- Clade: Magnoliids
- Order: Piperales
- Family: Piperaceae
- Genus: Peperomia
- Species: P. viracochana

Binomial name
- Peperomia viracochana Trel.

= Peperomia viracochana =

Species of herb

Peperomia viracochana of plant from the genus Peperomia. It was first described by William Trelease and published in the book "Publications of the Field Museum of Natural History, Botanical Series 13(2): 105. 1936". It is endemic to Cusco, Peru.

== Etymology ==
Viracochana came from the deity "Viracocha". The species was discovered in the temple of Viracocha.

== Description ==
It is a sub-small turfy herb, with a graceful stem 1-2 millimeters thick and grayish-pubescent. Leaves at the node at 2-4 elliptic on both sides and sub-acute small that are 2-2.5 centimeters long and 1.5 centimeters wide when dry. It is subtly conspicuously venulous, 3-veined, pinkish rib, sub-persistently pubescent on both sides. petiole is barely 5 millimeters long more or less pubescent; spikes terminal or in axillary whorls and fallen leaves false paniculate 30 millimeters long 1-millimeter thick laxiflora, peduncle 1 centimeter long pubescent; plates round-peltate; berry sub mucronate round, stigma oblique.
