= Ch'uspini =

Mountain in Peru

- Location within Peru

Highest point
- Elevation: 5,000 m (16,000 ft)
- Coordinates: 14°06′31″S 70°05′31″W

Geography
- Location: Peru, Puno Region
- Parent range: Andes

Ch'uspini (Aymara jaju, ch'uspi mosquito, -ni a suffix to indicate ownership, "the one with mosquitos", also spelled Chuspini) is a mountain in the Andes of Peru, about 5,000 metres (16,404 ft) high. It is situated in the Puno Region, Carabaya Province, on the border of the districts Coasa and Usicayos. Ch'uspini lies northeast of the mountain Hatun Pinkilluni.
