= San Pedro District, Canchis =

Coordinates: 14.1861°S 71.3434°W

San Pedro District
- District
- Interactive map of San Pedro District
- Country: Peru
- Region: Cusco
- Province: Canchis
- Founded: November 28, 1912
- Capital: San Pedro

Government
  - Mayor: Isaac Quispe Morocco

Area
  - Total: 54.91 km^{2} (21.20 sq mi)
- Elevation: 3,485 m (11,434 ft)

Population (2005 census)
  - Total: 3,232
  - Density: 58.86/km^{2} (152.4/sq mi)
- Time zone: UTC-5 (PET)
- UBIGEO: 080607

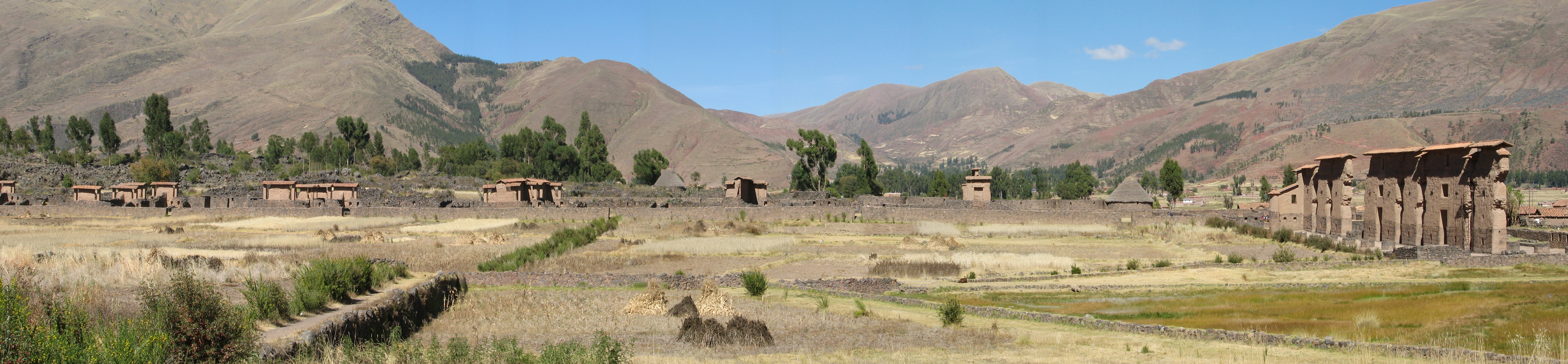
Raqch’i archaeological site in Canchis Province, Peru

San Pedro District is one of eight districts of the province Canchis in Peru.

== Geography ==
The most important river of the district is the Willkanuta which crosses the district from south-east to north-west.

== Ethnic groups ==
The people in the district are mainly indigenous citizens of Quechua descent. Quechua is the language which the majority of the population (73.16%) learnt to speak in childhood, 26.52% of the residents started speaking using the Spanish language (2007 Peru Census).

== See also ==
- Kimsachata
- Raqch'i
