= Challhuani =

Mountain in Peru

- Location within Peru

Highest point
- Elevation: 5,000 m (16,000 ft)
- Coordinates: 14°06′31″S 70°13′24″W

Geography
- Location: Peru, Puno Region, Carabaya Province
- Parent range: Andes, Carabaya

Challhuani (possibly from Aymara challwa fish, -ni a suffix, "the one with fish") is mountain in the Carabaya mountain range in the Andes of Peru, about 5,000 m (16,000 ft) high. It is located in the Puno Region, Carabaya Province, Ajoyani District. Challhuani lies southeast of Queroni.
