= Pampaqucha (Puno) =

Lake in the Ayacucho Region, Peru

- Location within Peru
- Location: Puno Region, Carabaya Province
- Coordinates: 14°6′3″S 70°10′55″W
- Basin countries: Peru

Pampaqucha (Quechua pampa a large plain, qucha lake also spelled Pampacocha) is a lake in the Andes of Peru. It is located in the Puno Region, Carabaya Province, Ajoyani District. Pampaqucha lies northwest of the peak of Hatun Pinkilluni.

== See also ==
- Pumaqulluni
