= Raqch'i =

Archaeological site in Peru

- Temple of Wiracocha, Temple of Viracocha at Chacha (Raqch'i)
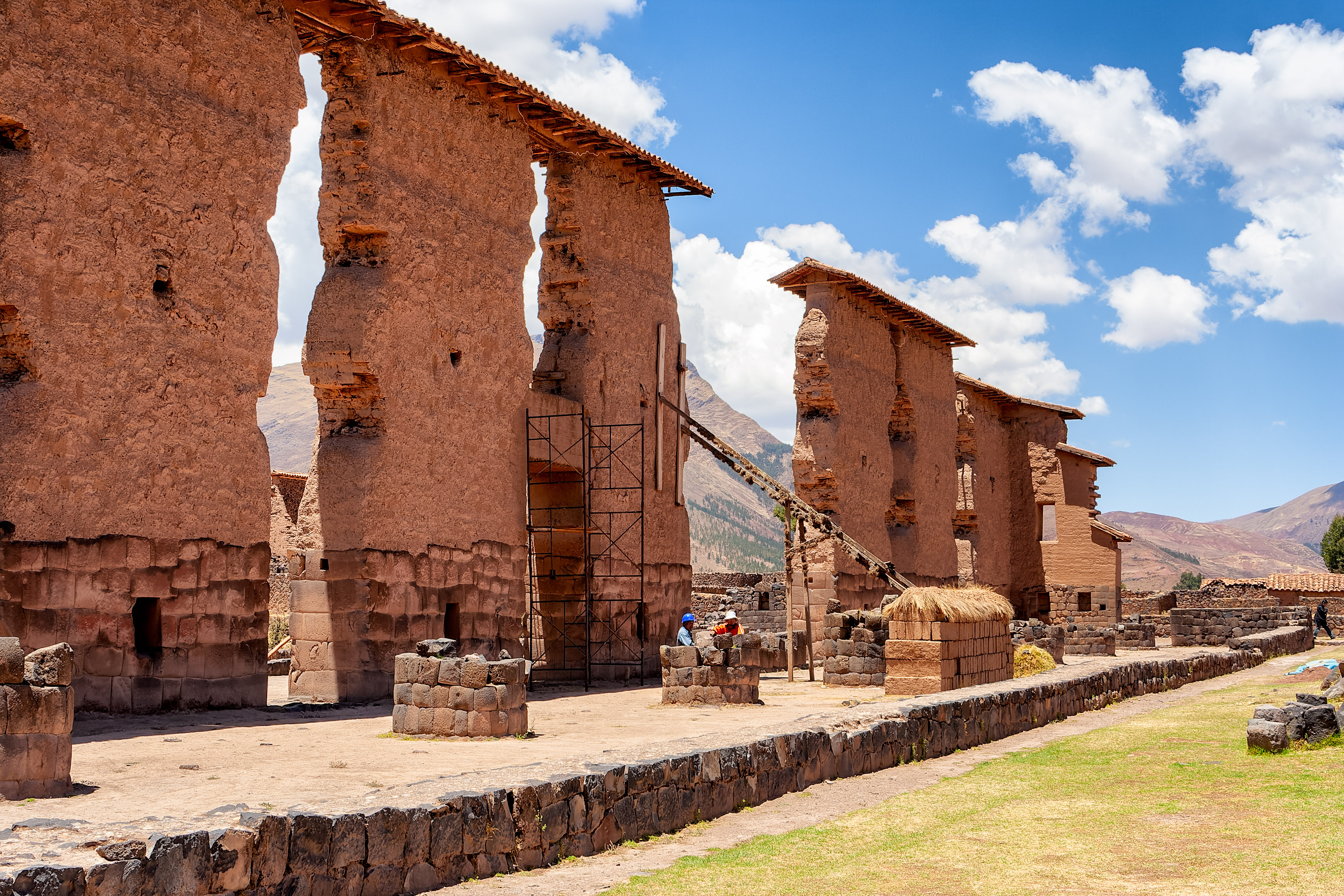
- Central wall of the Temple of Wiracocha, the bases of the circular columns that in the past supported the roof of this Kallanka are still visible.

- Location within Peru
- Interactive map of Raqch'i
- 14°10′30″S 71°22′00″W
- Type: Settlement
- Cultures: Inca
- Location: Peru, Cusco Region, Canchis Province
- Region: Andes

Site notes
- Area: 10.97 km^{2} (4.24 sq mi)

Raqch'i (Quechua) is an Inca archaeological site in Peru located in the Cusco Region, Canchis Province, San Pedro District, near the populated place Raqch'i. It is 3480 meters above sea level and 110 kilometers from the city of Cuzco. It also known as the Temple of Wiracocha, one of its constituents. Both lie along the Vilcanota River. The site has experienced a recent increase in tourism in recent years, with 83,334 visitors to the site in 2006, up from 8,183 in 2000 and 452 in 1996.

== Layout ==
The Inka site at Raqch'i was a primary control point on a road system that originated in Cusco and expanded as the Inka empire grew. It is located in a valley known for sacred sites. Most of the Inka structures are enclosed by a 4 km-long perimeter wall, but just outside it, on the Inka road that entered Raqch'i from Cusco, an enclosure with eight rectangular buildings around a large courtyard was probably a tampu (a lodging house for travellers). The administrative records from around the same time as the site indicate that this was in all likelihood such a place. The complex of Raqch'i consists of several different areas each designated with a specific function. Some have noted that these buildings may have been for religious and administrative officials. Others speculate that these buildings, paired with the scale of defenses may have been used as barracks to house troops. Nearby are approximately 220 circular buildings, likely used as storehouses, called qullqas. On the nearby hillsides are irrigated terraces which were likely used to keep the qullqas full for those traveling through. Raqch'i also houses a nearby spring and a pool or bath in proximity to the Temple of Wiracocha which could have been used for rituals. It has also been mentioned that because of the dual religious and administrative purposes, that the Sun cult might have held the surrounding lands to keep llamas for sacrifice like a similar site called Mayobamba.

=== Defense ===
There is some evidence that there was a village on the same site before the Inka conquest, but that it was the Inka who built the defensive changes to the city. Raqch'i is located on a prominent ridge overlooking the surrounding valley which provides a natural defensive position. Just beyond the wall there is a large dry moat running along the edge of the ridge the site is situated on. This in addition to the natural defense of steep slopes indicates that there was a reason that the Inka wanted or needed this site to be extremely well protected.

=== Temple of Wiracocha ===
The most prominent structure is the Temple of Wiracocha, an enormous rectangular two-story roofed structure that measures 92 metres (302 ft) by 25.5 metres (84 ft). That is the biggest kallanka of the Inca Empire. This structure consists of a central adobe wall some 18 to 20 meters in height with an andesite base. Windows and doors allow passage. It is flanked on each side by a row of eleven columns. The foundations measure 4 metres (13 ft) for both the wall and the columns are classic high Inca stonework with the remaining height built of adobe.

Prior to its destruction by the Spaniards, the temple had what is believed to be the largest single gable roof in the Incan Empire, know having its peak at the central wall, then stretching over the columns and some 25 metres (82 ft) beyond on each side. The largest gable roof on the Inca Empire and Pre-Columbian Americas know so far is located inside the Inkallaqta complex, however it doesn't have a peak at the central wall like in the Temple of Raqchi. The huge proportions of the Raqchi temple, and its prominence on the site explain why the whole complex is also sometimes referred to as the Temple of Wiracocha.

The temple is the only Inka building for which we have an account of how people should walk through it. It is highly significant that the design of the building means that, on entering its two known doorways, progress of visitors is immediately blocked by a series of tall pillars that they are forced to walk around. If devotees took this as a suggestion as to how to proceed through the building, they would have begun to trace a path similar to a zig-zag motion. This could have been deliberate design; a way to express aspects of Inka cosmology in particular their relationship with Wiracocha. In processing through the temple, the devotees would have wound their way towards the statue of Viracocha, the volcano and the spring.

According to Inca mythology, Wiracocha came to the region the Inka called Kacha but the local people there did not recognize him and tried to attack him. When he saw this, he made fire fall from the sky and burn the hills around the people. The Kacha went to Wiracocha pleading forgiveness and he put the fires out and explained to them who he was. They built a wak'a (shrine) where Wiracocha had stood and gave him many offerings. When the Inka Huayna Capac passed by the province of Kacha he saw the wak'a shrine of Viracocha in the midst of the plain and he asked why it was there. The people of the province told him of the miracle that Viracocha had performed. He decided that the remembrance of this event should be greater and ordered the erection of the temple.

=== Living quarters ===
Adjoining the temple to the north are twelve living quarters which would have housed both priests and local administrators. The living area is divided into separate squared lots the largest of which is roughly 4x6m. All have niches in their walls which might have been used for storage, though some of the niches have cover posts, suggesting they may have held sacred objects.

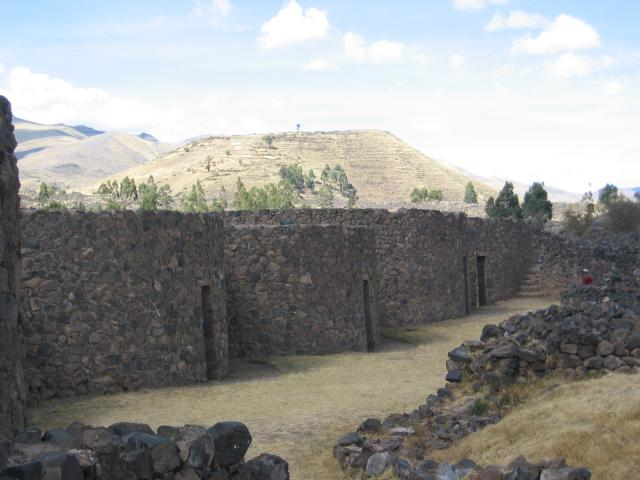
The storehouses

=== Storehouses ===
To the eastern side of the temple are 152 round qullqas in parallel lines, each measuring some 10 metres (33 ft) in diameter. These storehouses were used to hold grains, such as corn and quinoa, that would have been used for ceremonial purposes as well as pottery, woven cloth and military equipment. The storehouses are also unique as unlike other structures throughout the empire they are not square cornered. The reason for this is unknown.

=== Qucha ===
The Qucha (Quechua for "lake") is an artificial lake fed by a spring through two sets of finely constructed stone fountains with a raised platform beside one of them. It is a central feature of the site that is overlooked by both the temple and the raised platform, and is fed by the two fountains, which are of a type that the Inka used in cleansing rituals and as a place to make offerings. Between the northern fountain and the raised platform archaeologists found a deep layer of ash that may have been the remains of burnt offerings made on or near the raised platform. This ash was possibly being stored prior to depositing it in the qucha and letting it wash into the Willkanuta River (a similar ceremony is reported for Inka Cuzco). In Inka cosmology, springs were often regarded as sacred, and the association with the temple and the volcano may suggest that the spring at Raqch'i, with its fountains, was conceived of as the place of origin of the K'ana people mentioned in the legend of Viracocha.

According to one legend, after Viracocha caused fire to come down from the sky, he was taken from the people and the rivers dried up. As the people prayed and were beginning to die from want of thirst, Viracocha appeared before them in a white robe and a staff in his hand. He then thrust the staff into the volcanic rock which caused water to flow. "This is the most sacred spring in South America, the life-giving Waters of Vira Cocha where the Prophet once stood and thrust His staff into the lava to save a repentant nation from death."

=== Fairground and baths ===
To the west of the temple is a large field, now used by locals for farming, that might have been a fairground or to hold overflow of worshipers from the temple itself. On the far western edge of this field is a set of baths similar to ceremonial baths at important sites throughout the empire.

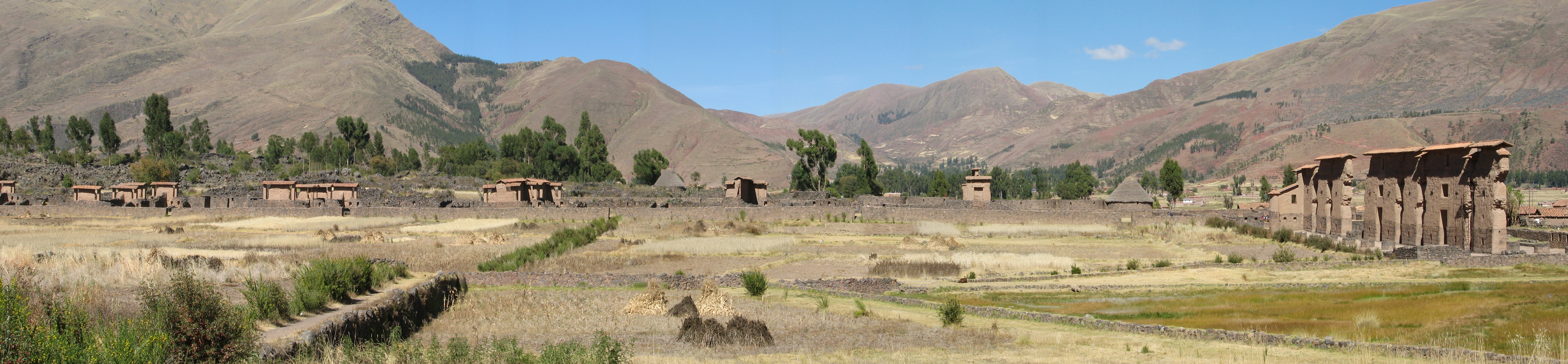
Raqchi overview with the Temple of Wiracocha on the far right

== Gallery ==
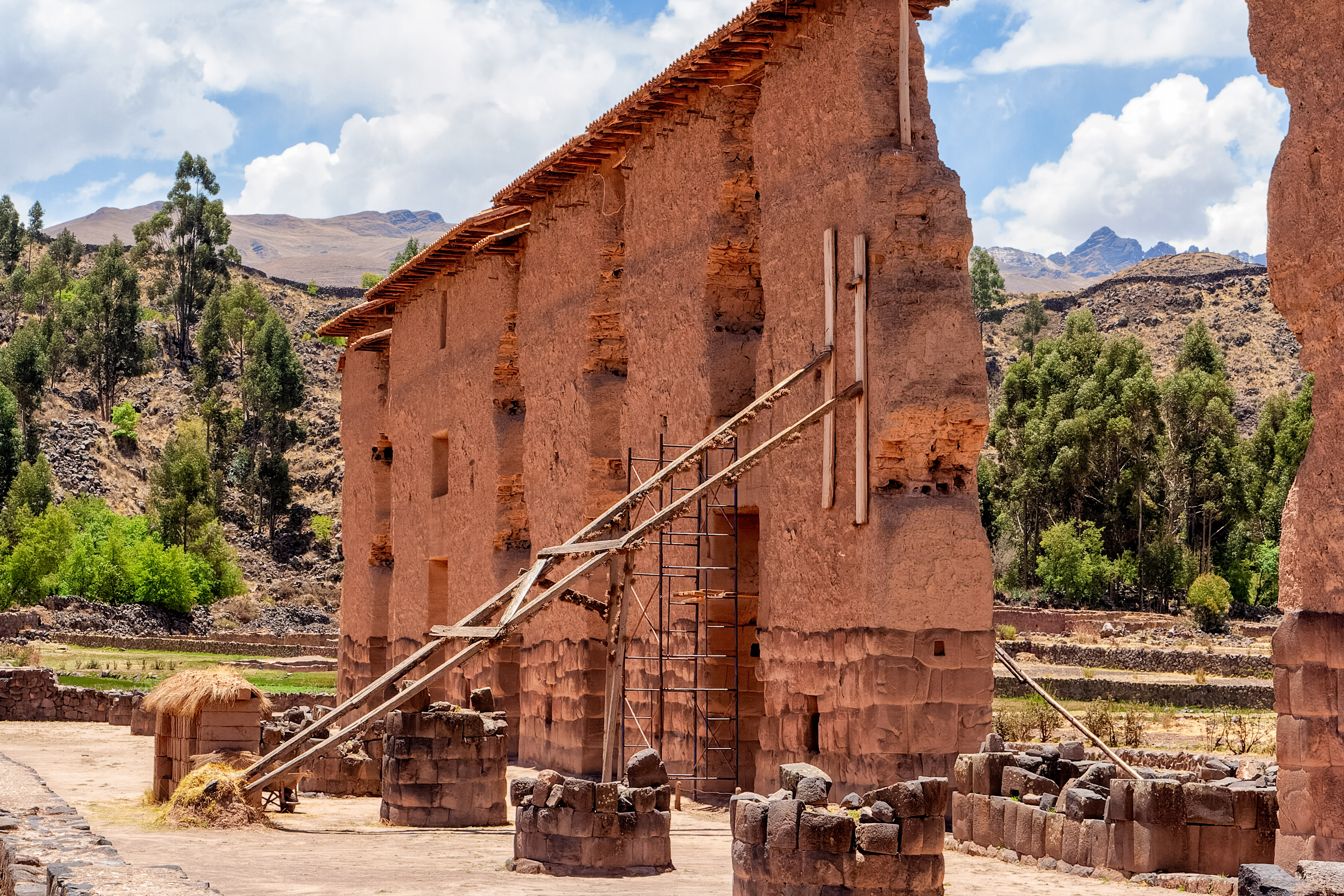
Temple of Wiracocha

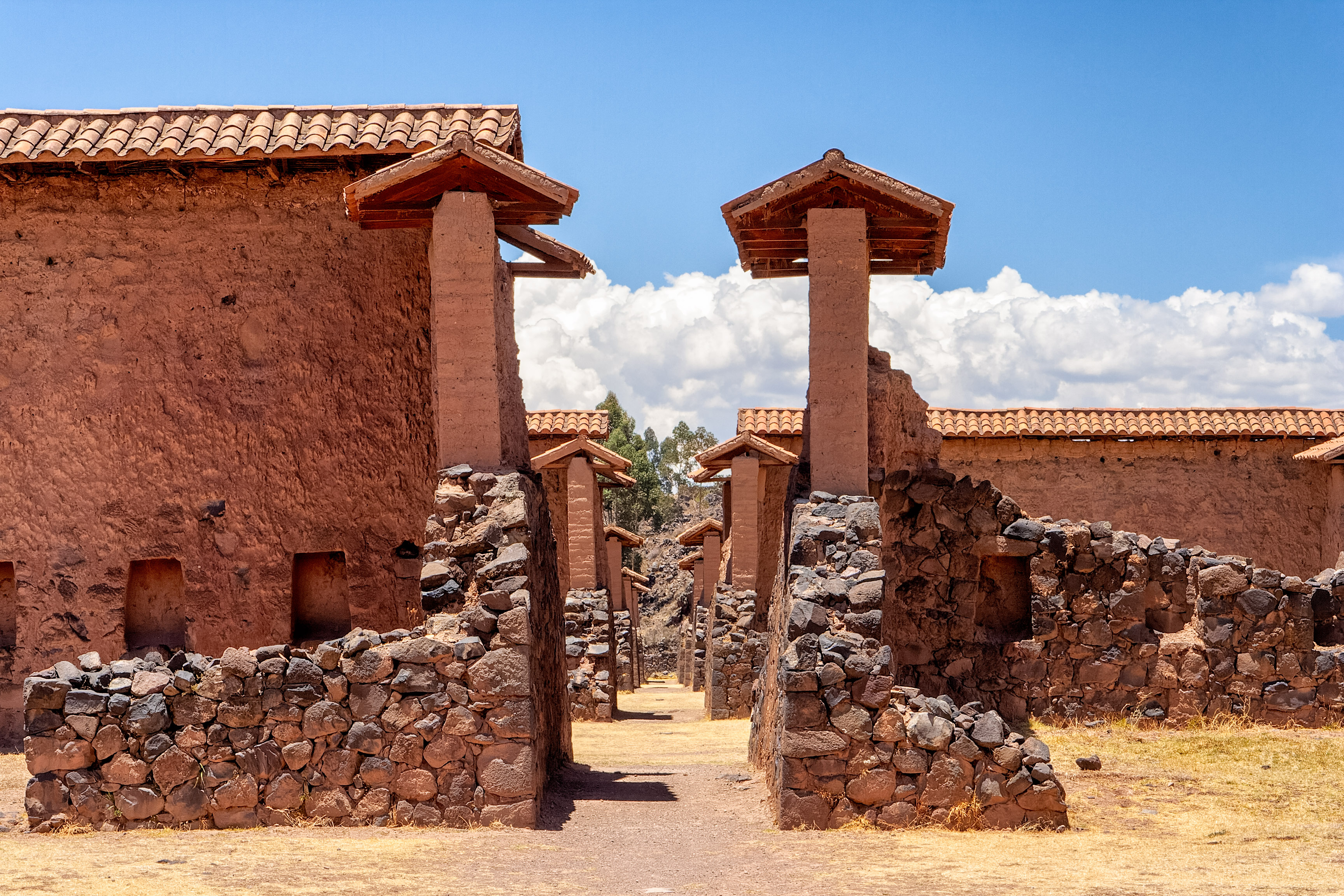
Raqchi quarters

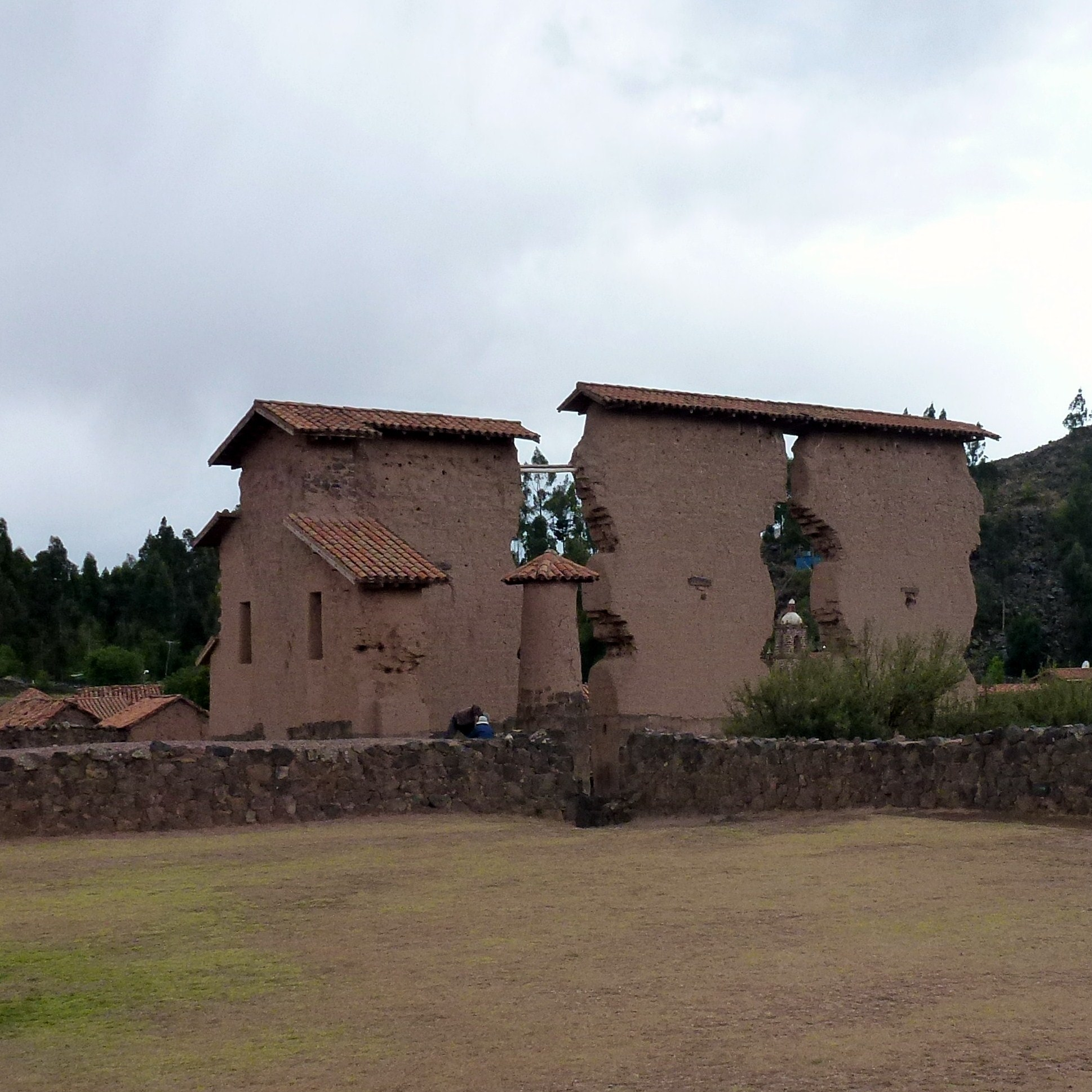
Raqchi - Temple of Wiracocha

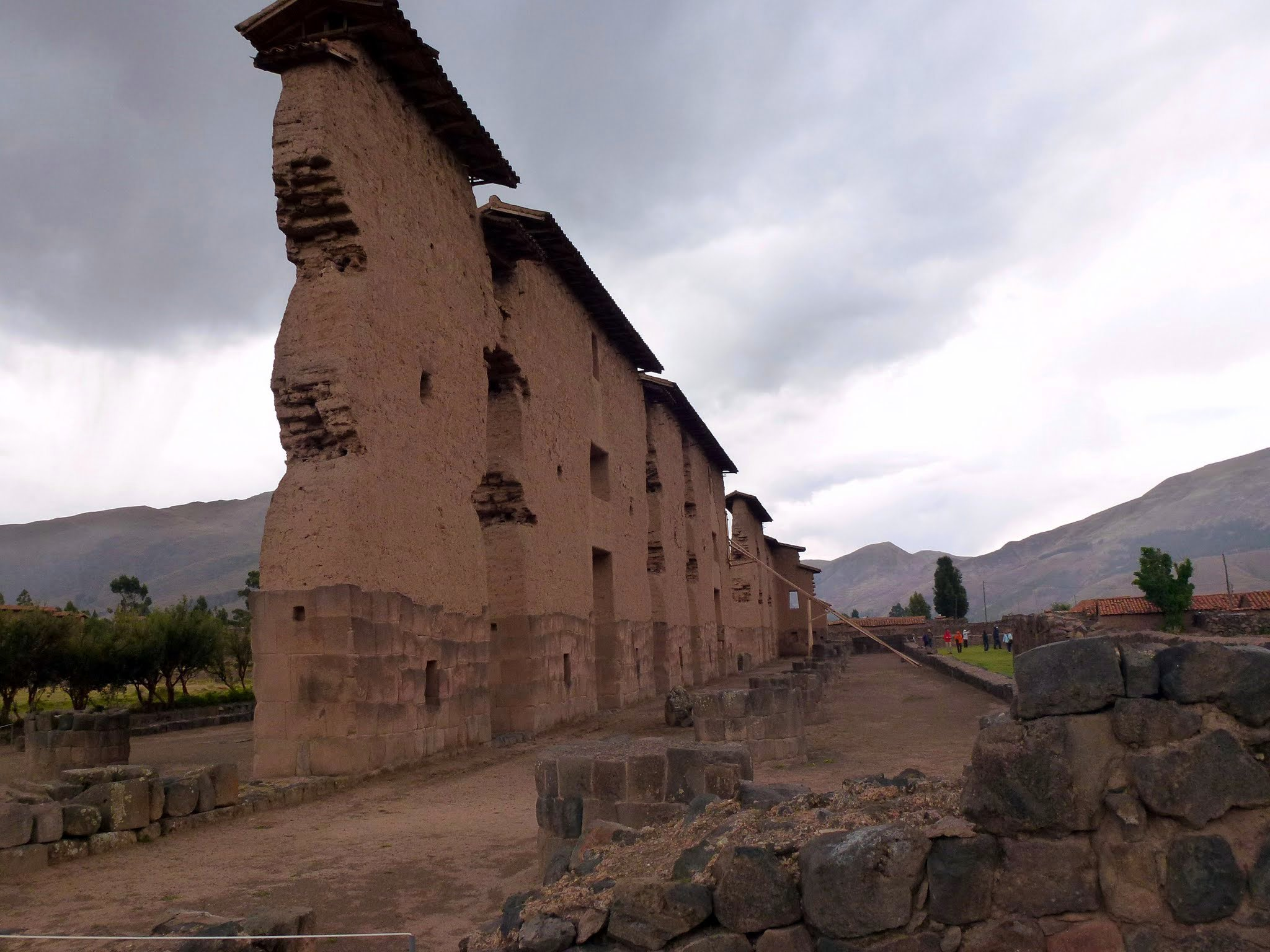
Raqchi - Temple of Wiracocha

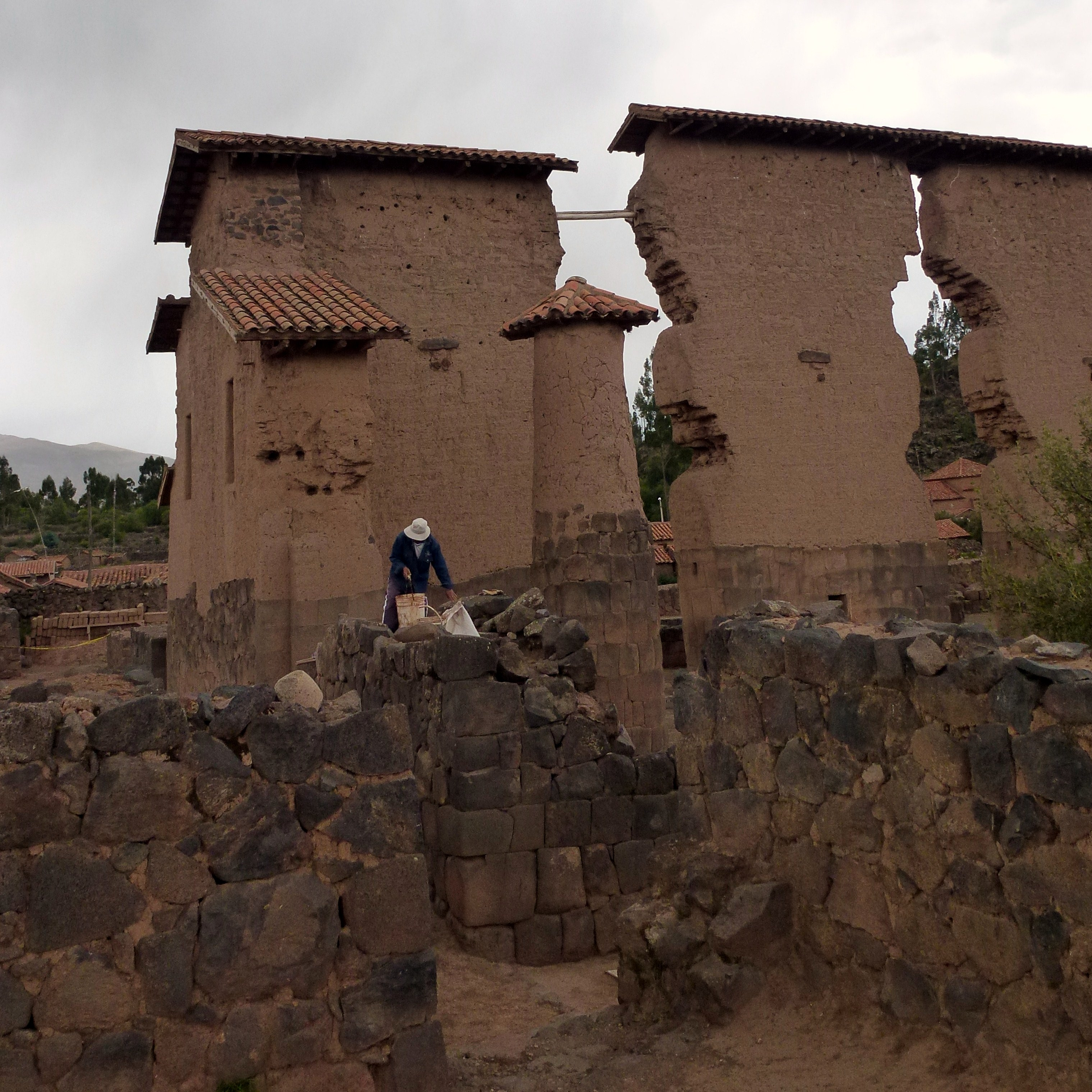
Raqchi - Temple of Wiracocha

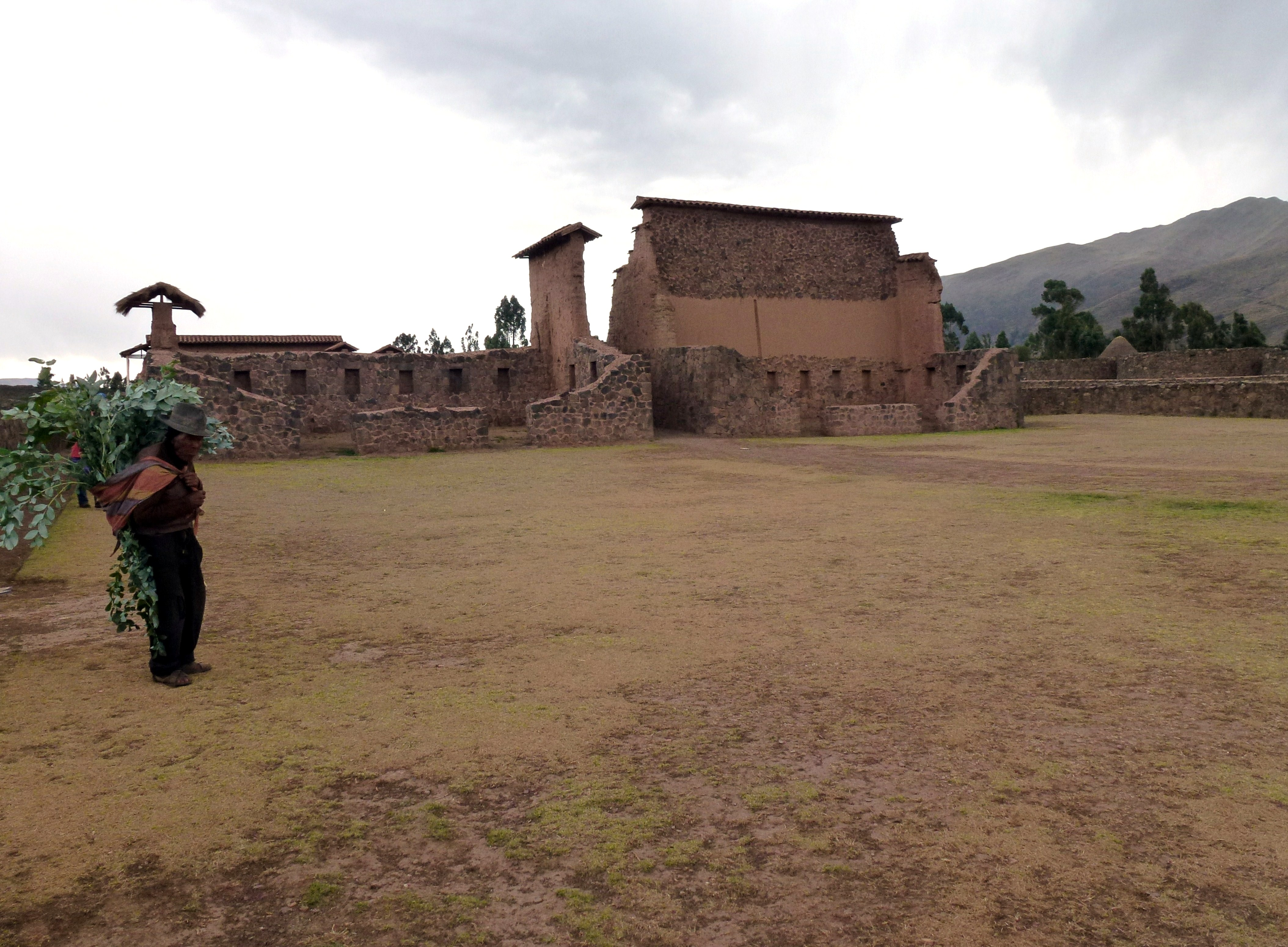
Raqchi - Temple of Wiracocha

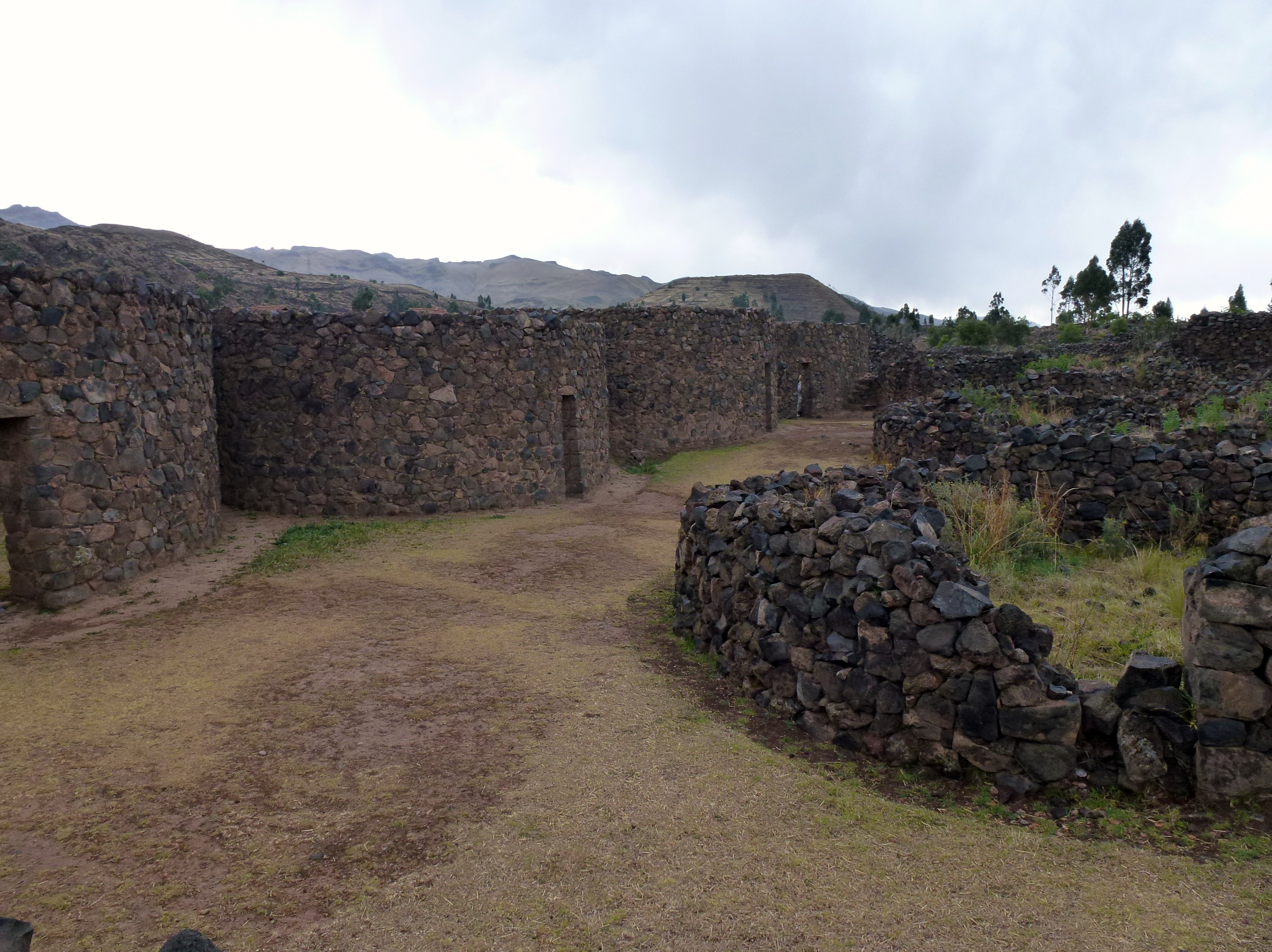
Raqchi - Temple of Wiracocha-colcas (storehouses)

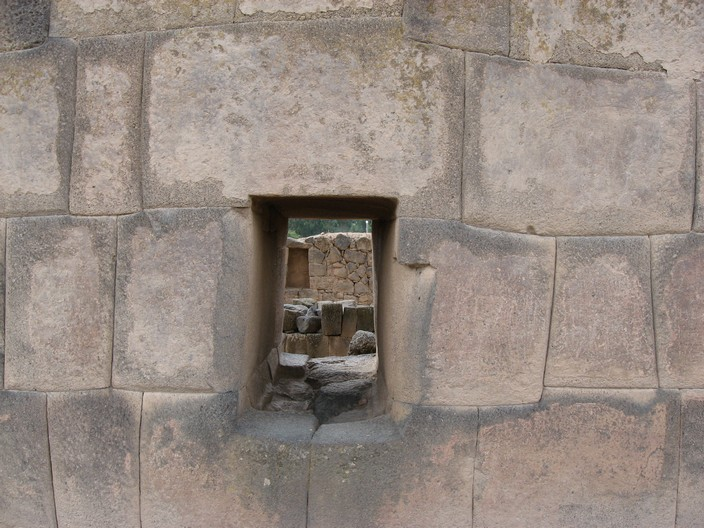
In Wiracocha temple

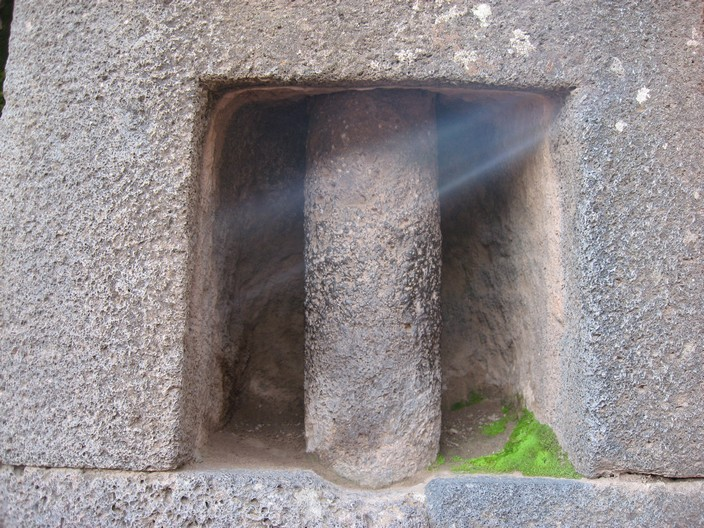
Wiracocha temple, detail

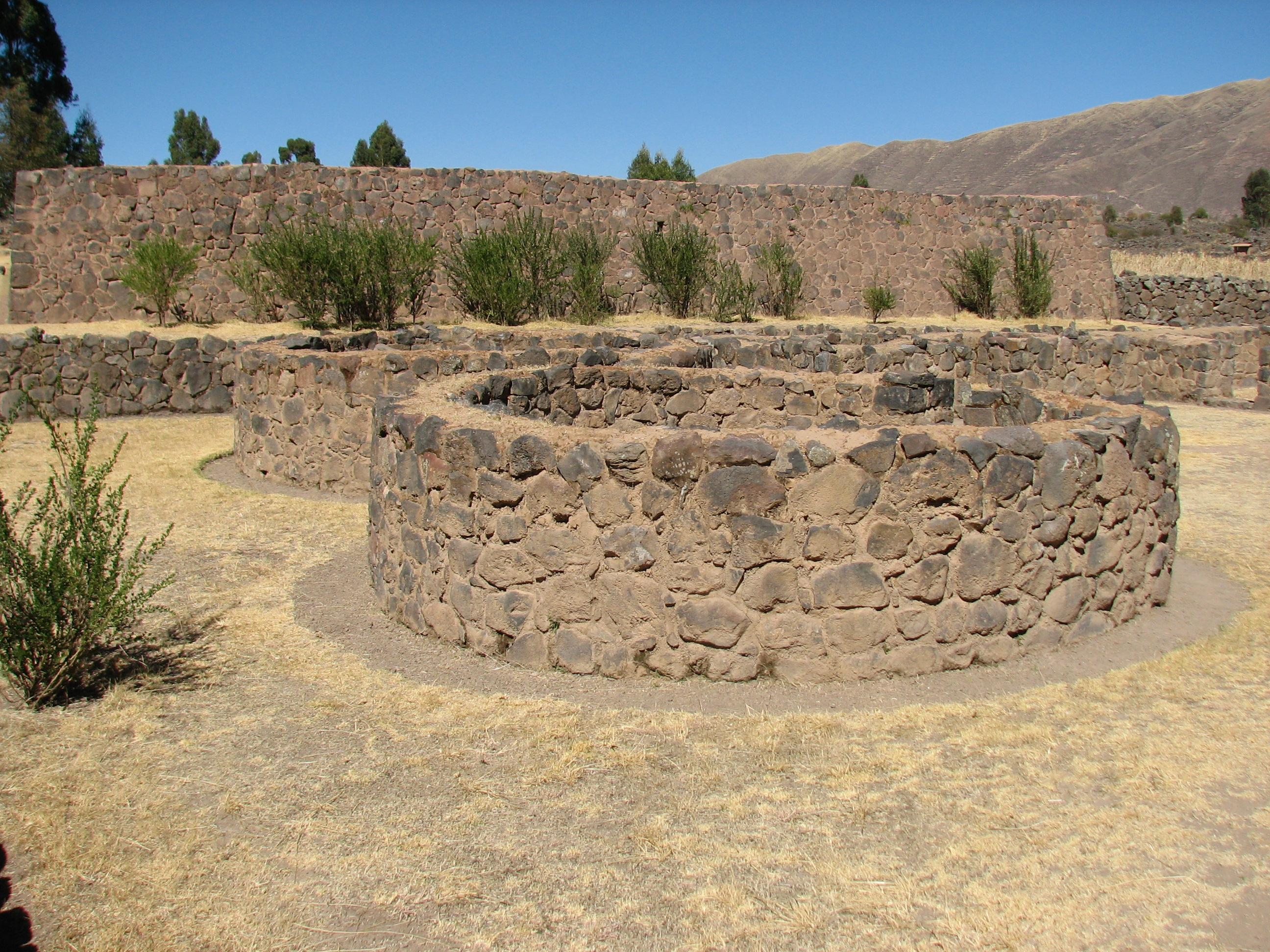
Qullqas, typical constructions of the Incas.

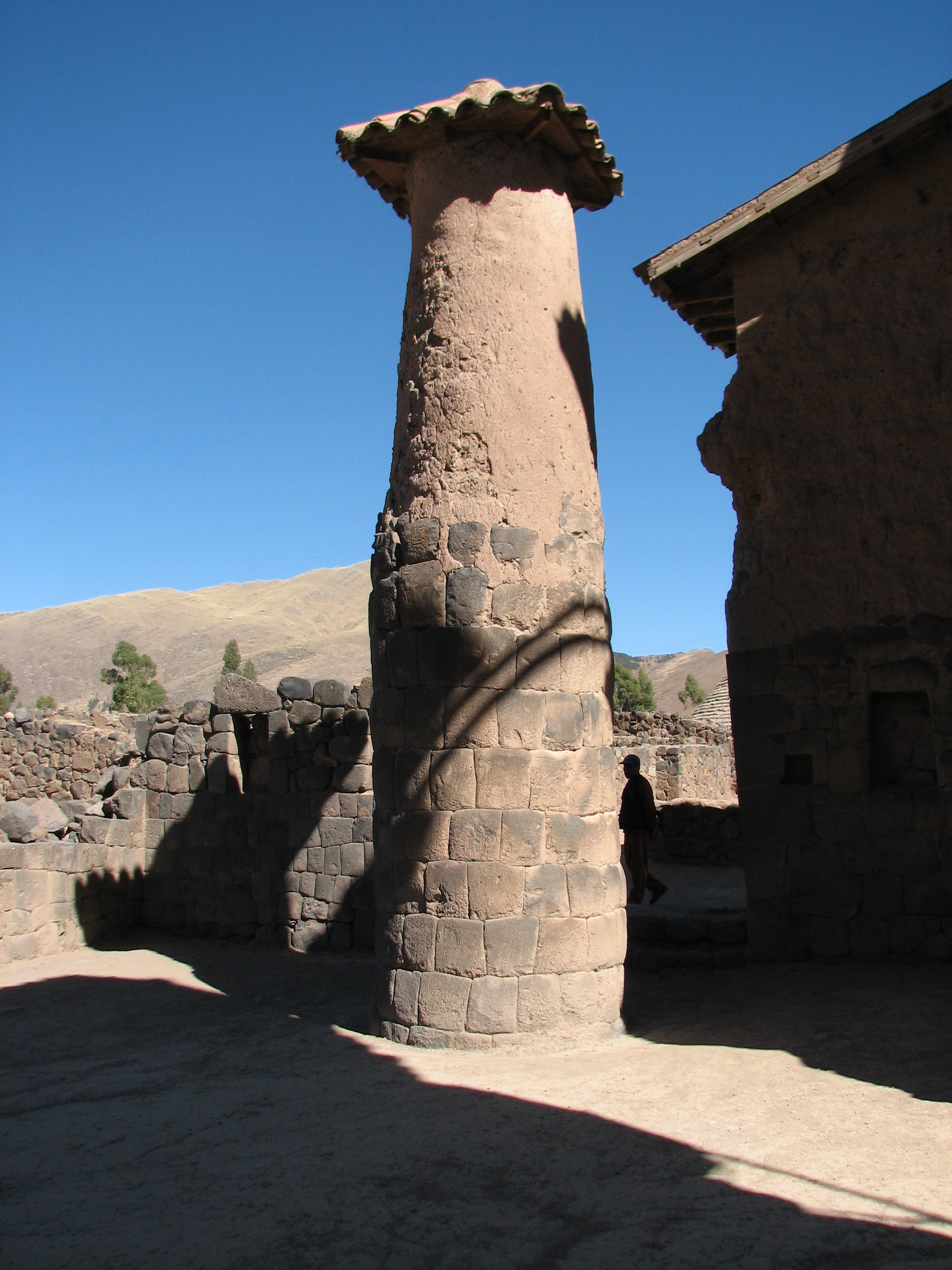
Remains of a column

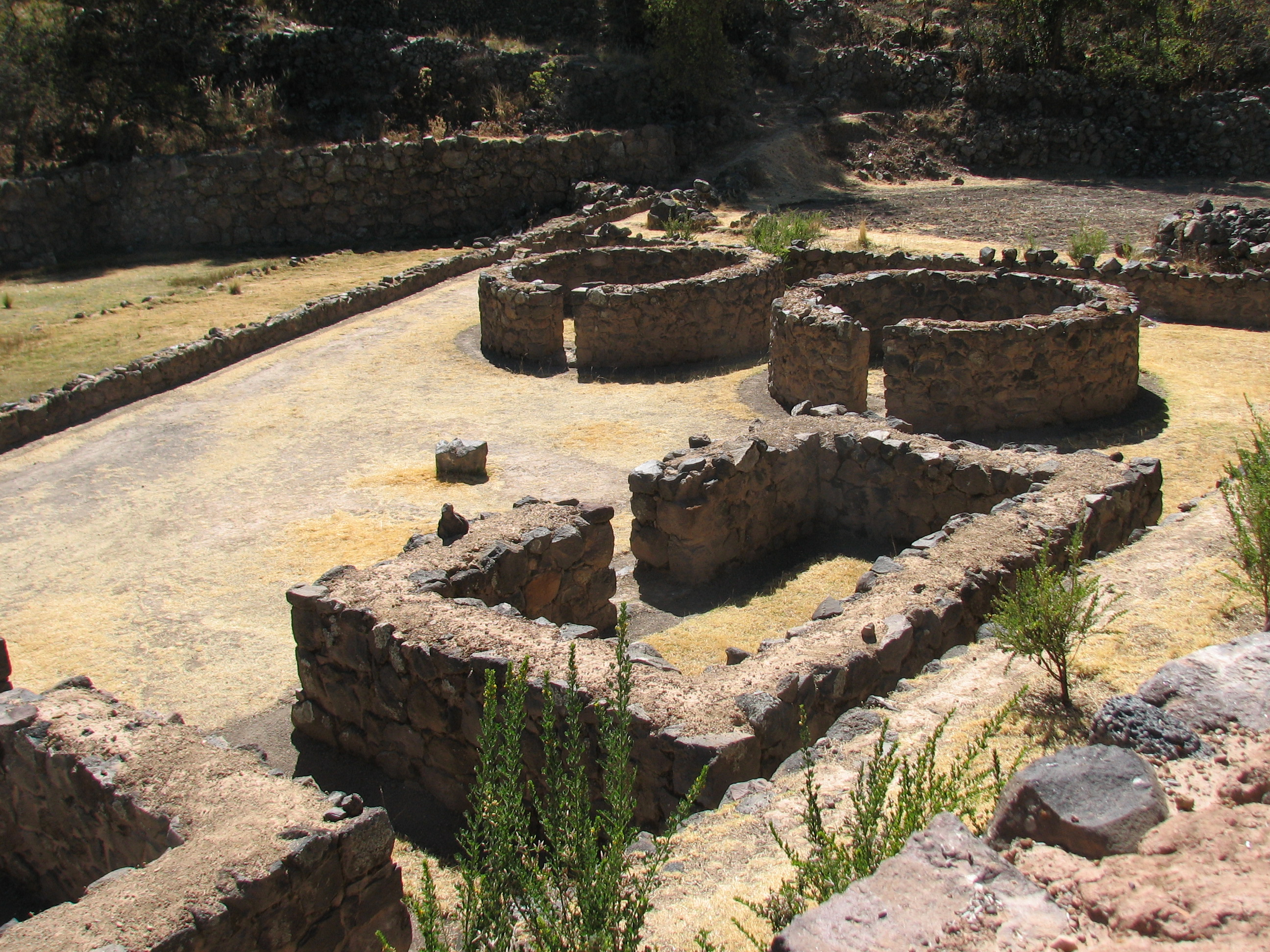
Colcas at Raqchi

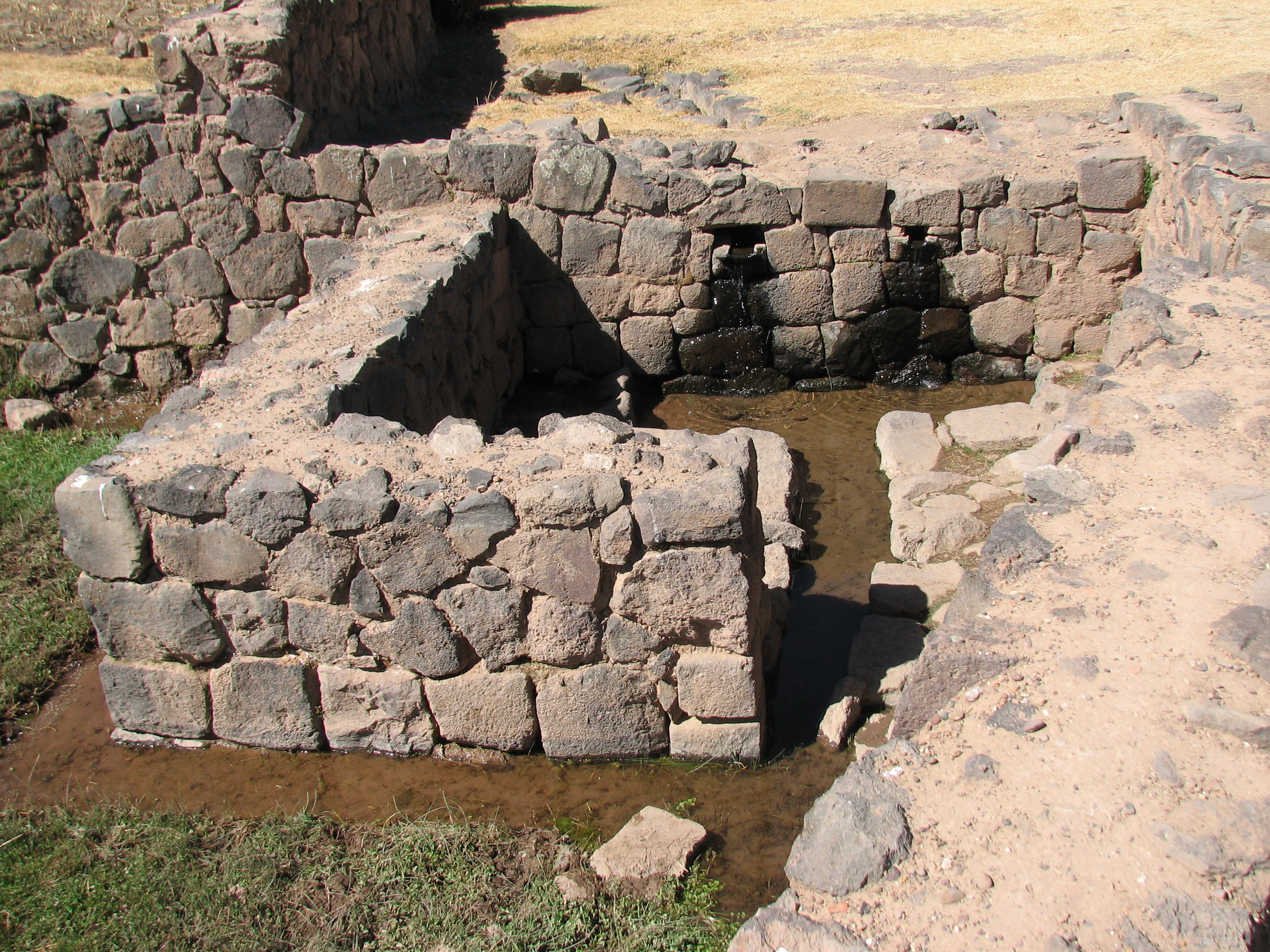
One of the baths.

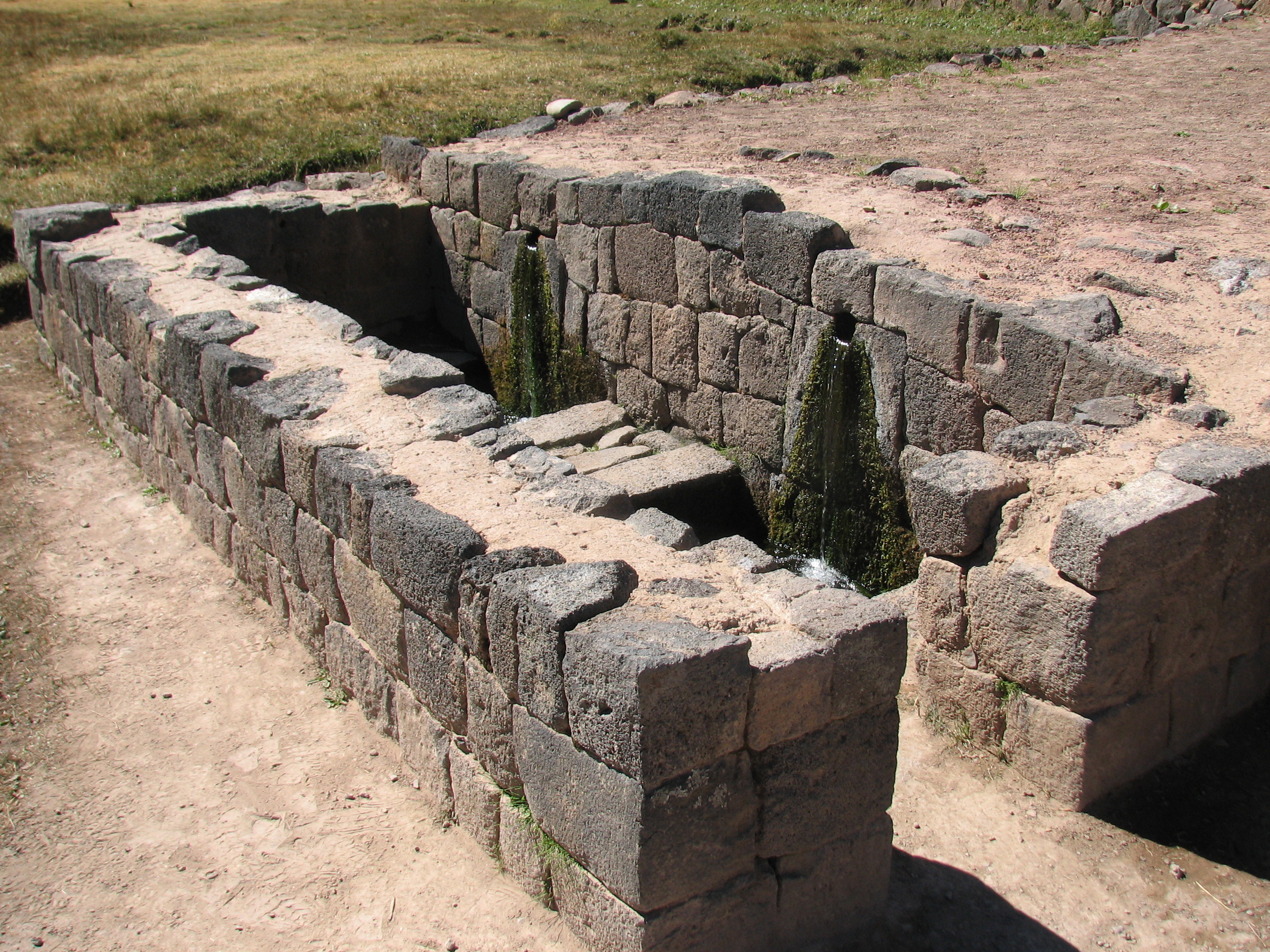
Inca baths supplied with permanent water.

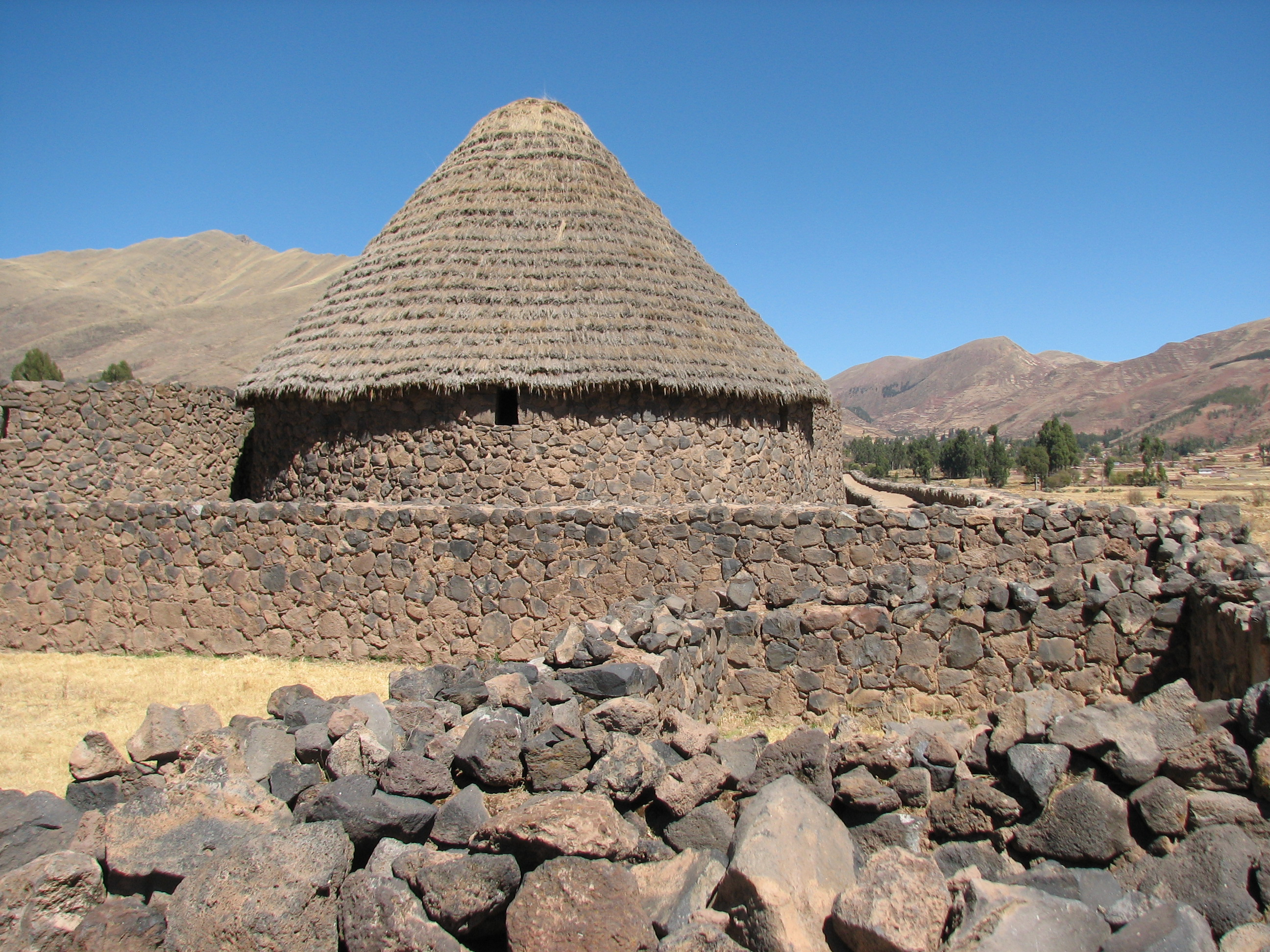
Colca restored with thatched roof

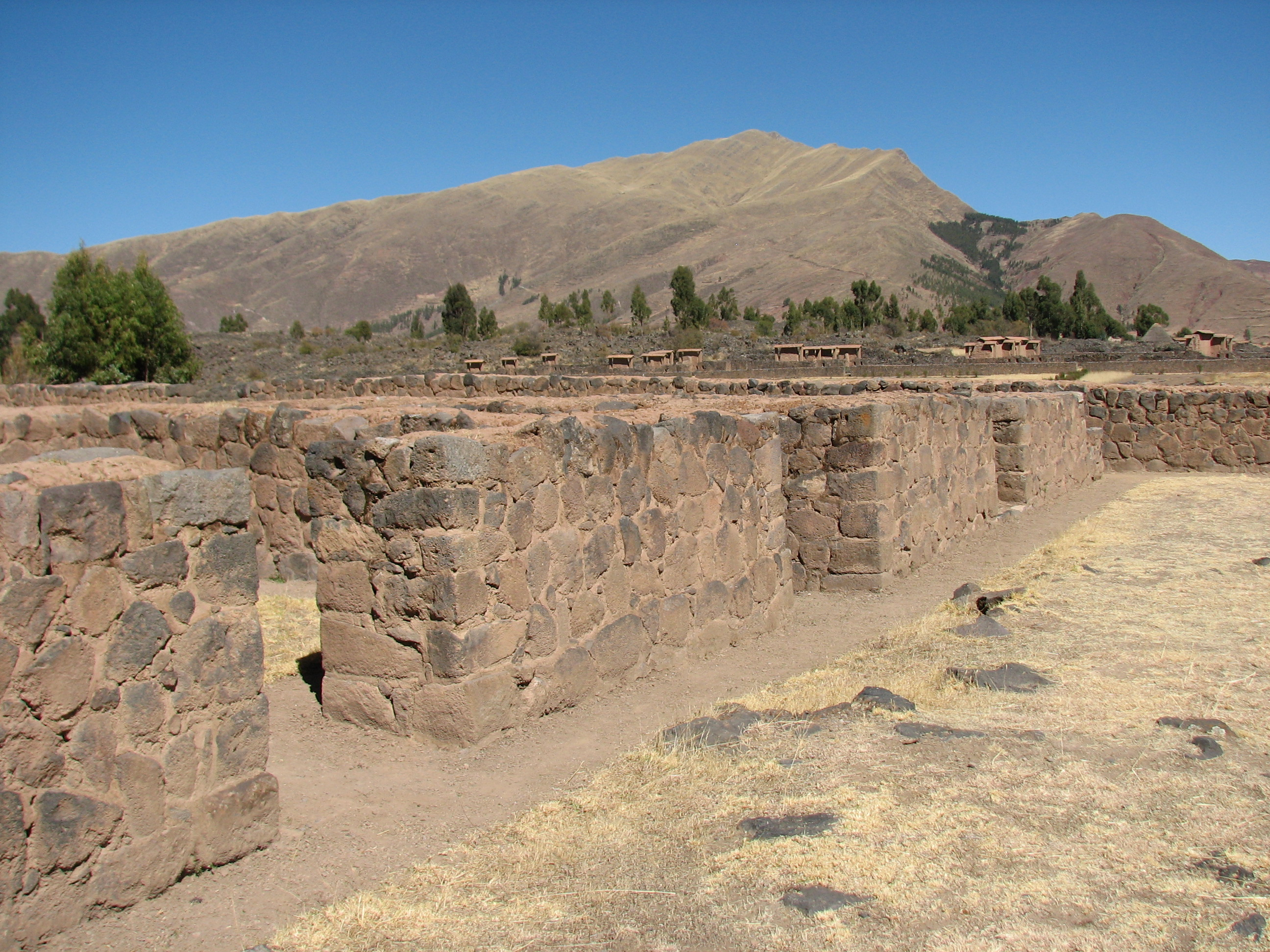
Rooms

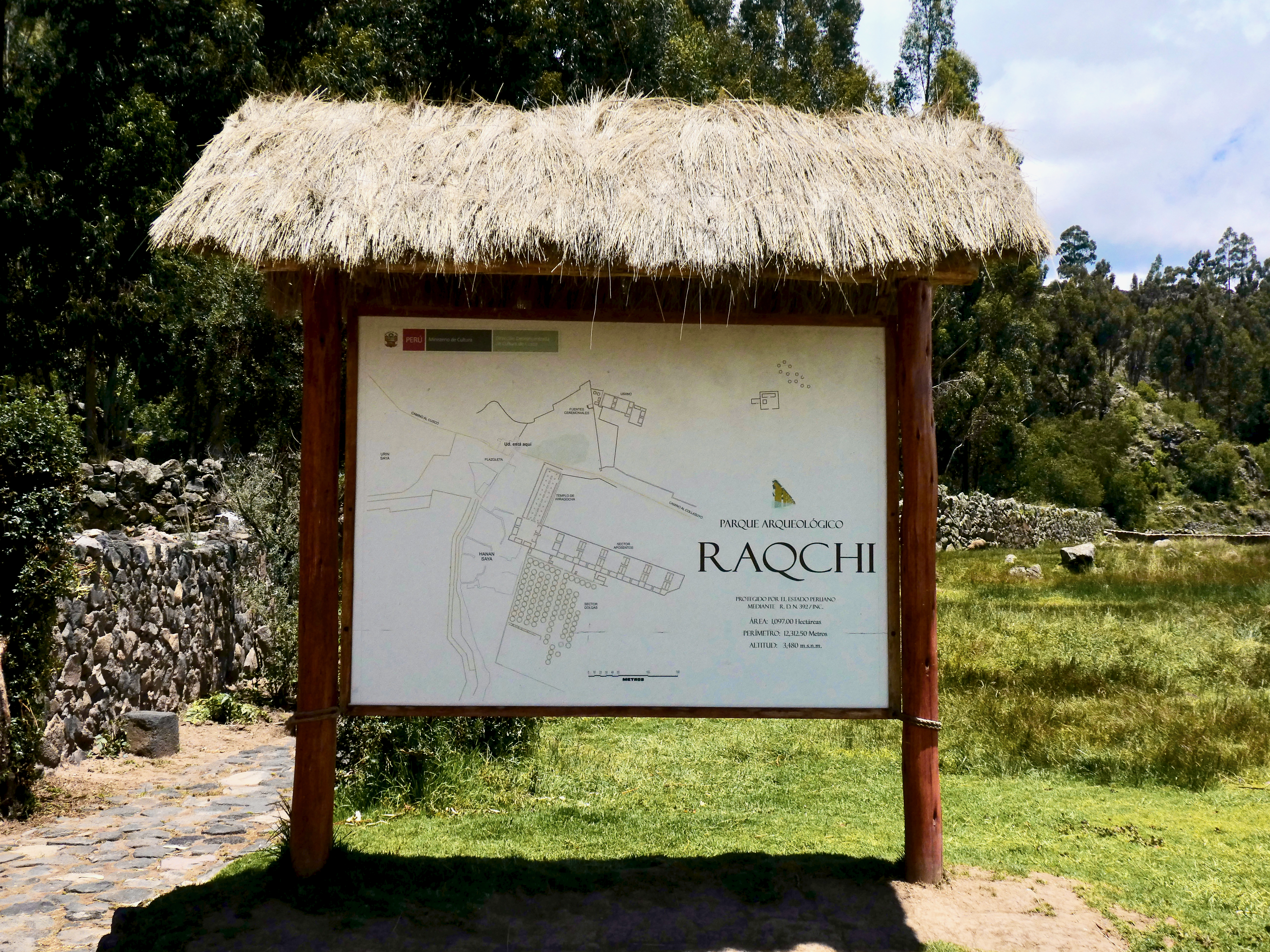
Map of the archaeological site

== See also ==
- Kimsachata
- List of archaeological sites in Peru
