= Pumajolluni =

Mountain in Peru

- Location within Peru

Highest point
- Elevation: 5,200 m (17,100 ft)
- Coordinates: 14°03′40″S 70°12′20″W

Geography
- Location: Peru, Puno Region
- Parent range: Andes, Carabaya

Pumajolluni (possibly from Aymara puma cougar, puma, qullu mountain, -ni a suffix to indicate ownership, "the one with a cougar mountain") is a mountain in the Carabaya mountain range in the Andes of Peru at a lake of the same name. The mountain is about 5,200 metres (17,060 ft) high. It is located in the Puno Region, Carabaya Province, on the border of the districts Ajoyani, Coasa and Ituata. It lies southwest of the mountain Chullumpirini.

The lake named Pumajolluni is situated south of the mountain at 14°04′40″S 70°12′20″W between the lakes Vilacota in the northwest and Pampacocha and Ajojajota in the southeast.
