= Usicayos District =

Coordinates: 14°07′35″S 69°58′04″W

Usicayos
- District
- Interactive map of Usicayos
- Country: Peru
- Region: Puno
- Province: Carabaya
- Founded: May 2, 1854
- Capital: Usicayos

Government
  - Mayor: Paul William Sotomayor Guerra

Area
  - Total: 644.04 km^{2} (248.67 sq mi)
- Elevation: 3,778 m (12,395 ft)

Population (2005 census)
  - Total: 9,757
  - Density: 15.15/km^{2} (39.24/sq mi)
- Time zone: UTC-5 (PET)
- UBIGEO: 210310

Usicayos District is one of ten districts of the Carabaya Province in Peru.

== Geography ==
One of the highest elevations of the district is Ch'uspini at approximately 5,000 m (16,000 ft). Other mountains are listed below:

- Anta Punta
- Chikuru
- Chikuruni
- Ch'amak Tira
- Inti Pukllana
- Lawan Tira
- Lawani
- Llamayuq Urqu
- Minas Tira
- Qinamari
- Sura Pata
- Tarpata Urqu
- T'anta Tira
- Wila Muqu Urqu
- Wisk'achani
- Wiyachani
- Yana Chuku

== Ethnic groups ==
The people in the district are predominantly indigenous citizens of Quechua descent. Quechua is the language which the majority of the population (96.96%) learnt to speak in childhood, while 2.84% of the residents started speaking using the Spanish (2007 Peru Census).

== See also ==
- Ch'uxñaquta
