= Sayt'uquta (Coasa) =

Lake in Coasa District in the Andes of Peru

- Location within Peru
- Location: Puno Region
- Coordinates: 14°03′08″S 70°06′50″W
- Basin countries: Peru

Sayt'uquta (Aymara sayt'u tapering, quta lake "tapering lake", also spelled Saytojota) is a lake in the Andes of Peru. It is situated in the Puno Region, Carabaya Province, Coasa District, south of the river Achasiri.
