= Tani Tani =

Mountain in Peru

- Location within Peru

Highest point
- Elevation: 4,806 m (15,768 ft)
- Coordinates: 14°0′55″S 69°57′20″W

Geography
- Location: Peru, Puno Region
- Parent range: Andes

Tani Tani (local name for the flower Gentianella primuloides, also spelled Tanitani) is a mountain in the Andes of Peru, about 4,806 metres (15,768 ft) high. It is located in the Puno Region, Carabaya Province, Coasa District. Tani Tani lies west of the lake Qunchak'uchu (Quechua for "mushroom corner", Cconchacuccho, Cconchacucho).
