= Ch'uxñaquta (Carabaya) =

Lake in Peru

- Location within Peru Location within South America
- Interactive map of Ch'uxñaquta
- Location: Puno Region, Carabaya Province
- Coordinates: 14°2′23″S 69°54′18″W
- Basin countries: Peru

Ch'uxñaquta (Aymara ch'uxña green, quta lake "green lake", Hispanicized spelling Chocñacota) is a lake in the Andes of Peru. It is situated in the Puno Region, Carabaya Province, Usicayos District.
