= Coasa District =

Coordinates: 13°59′12″S 70°01′02″W

Coasa
- District
- Interactive map of Coasa
- Country: Peru
- Region: Puno
- Province: Carabaya
- Capital: Coasa

Government
  - Mayor: Meliton Palacios Casazola

Area
  - Total: 3,572.92 km^{2} (1,379.51 sq mi)
- Elevation: 3,783 m (12,411 ft)

Population (2005 census)
  - Total: 8,897
  - Density: 2.490/km^{2} (6.449/sq mi)
- Time zone: UTC-5 (PET)
- UBIGEO: 210304

Coasa District is one of ten districts of the Carabaya Province in Peru.

== Geography ==
One of the highest elevations of the district is Muru Muruni at approximately 5,200 m (17,100 ft). Other mountains are listed below:

- Amayani
- Aqhu Ch'uwaña
- Asnuni
- Chaka Kunka
- Chullumpirini
- Chhullu
- Ch'amak Tira
- Ch'uwañuma
- Ch'uspini
- Hatun Pinkilluni
- Inti Qururuni
- Janq'u Quta
- Japu Pata
- Kimsa Tinkuri
- Kuntur Ikiña
- Khunu
- Liqiliqini
- Puka Urqu
- Puma Qulluni
- Qillwani
- Q'umir Qucha Punta
- Rit'i Qucha
- Runa Ñan Kunka
- Sapa Kiswara
- Suqa Nasa
- Sura Pata
- Tampu Uma
- Tani Tani
- Taypi Tira
- Tinki Qucha
- Tinya Qucha
- Umaña
- Uqi Kunka
- Waka Wañusqa
- Wari Umaña
- Wila Laqaya
- Wisk'achani
- Yana Phawchi

== Ethnic groups ==
The people in the district are mainly indigenous citizens of Quechua descent. Quechua is the language which the majority of the population (95.16%) learnt to speak in childhood, 4.59% of the residents started speaking using the Spanish language (2007 Peru Census).

== See also ==
- Sayt'uqucha
