= Juan de Santa Cruz Pachacuti Yamqui Salcamaygua =

Indigenous Peruvian chronicler

- Born: 16th century Viceroyalty of Peru (Spanish Empire)
- Died: 17th century
- Occupations: Writer and chronicler

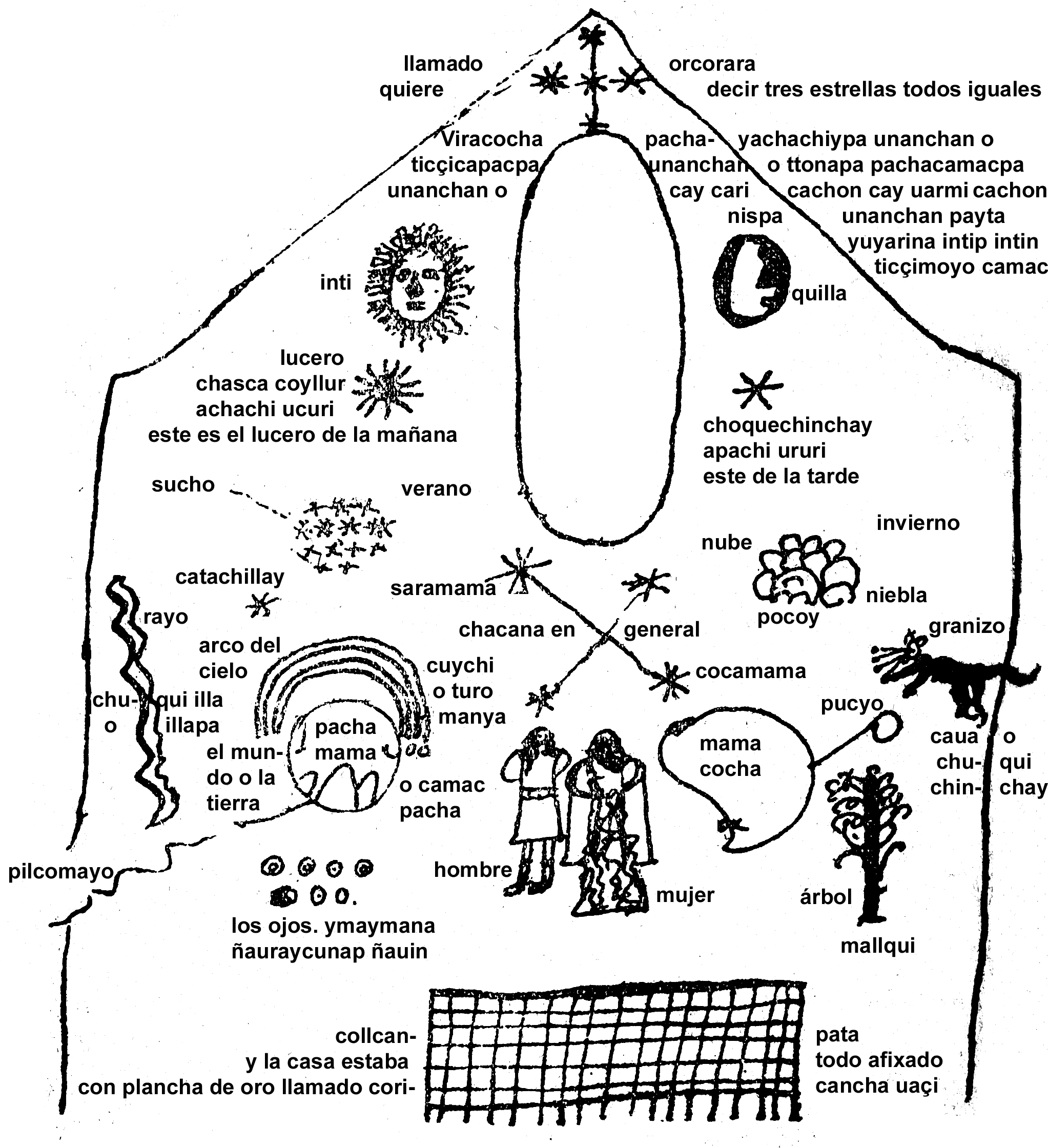
Drawing of the Incan worldview by Juan de Santa Cruz Pachacuti Yamqui Salcamayhua (1613), according to an image in the Temple of the Sun Coricancha and Pachakutiq.

Juan de Santa Cruz Pachacuti Yamqui Salcamayhua (Viceroyalty of Perú, end of the 16th century – 17th century) was an indigenous Peruvian chronicler. He wrote Relación de las antigüedades deste Reyno del Perú (List of the antiquities of this Kingdom of Peru).
