= Ajoyani District =

Coordinates: 14°13′51″S 70°13′29″W

Ajoyani Aqhuyani
- District
- Interactive map of Ajoyani
- Country: Peru
- Region: Puno
- Province: Carabaya
- Founded: May 2, 1854
- Capital: Ajoyani

Government
  - Mayor: Adolfo Cosme Quispe Hancco

Area
  - Total: 413.11 km^{2} (159.50 sq mi)
- Elevation: 4,250 m (13,940 ft)

Population (2005 census)
  - Total: 2,104
  - Density: 5.093/km^{2} (13.19/sq mi)
- Time zone: UTC-5 (PET)
- UBIGEO: 210302

Ajoyani District is one of ten districts of the province Carabaya in Peru.

== Geography ==
The Kallawaya mountain range traverses the district. Some of the highest mountains of the district are listed below:

- Challwani
- Hatun Pinkilluni
- Pichaqani
- Puka Apachita
- Puka Wayq'u
- Pumaqulluni
- Qinamari
- Q'iru Ch'ulluni
- Q'iruni
- Q'uli Kunka
- Q'umirqucha Punta
- Sallikani
- Tankani
- Taypi Tira
- Uqi Kunka Urqu
- Wampuni

== Ethnic groups ==
The people in the district are mainly indigenous citizens of Quechua descent. Quechua is the language which the majority of the population (81.53%) learnt to speak in childhood, 18.08% of the residents started speaking using the Spanish language (2007 Peru Census).
