= Jatun Pinguilluni =

Mountain in Peru

- Location within Peru

Highest point
- Elevation: 5,100 m (16,700 ft)
- Coordinates: 14°07′15″S 70°8′14″W

Geography
- Location: Peru, Puno Region
- Parent range: Andes, Carabaya

Jatun Pinguilluni (possibly from Quechua hatun big, pinkillu a kind of flute, Aymara -ni a suffix to indicate ownership, "the one with a big pinkillu") is a mountain in the Carabaya mountain range in the Andes of Peru, about 5,100 metres (16,732 ft) high. It is located in the Puno Region, Carabaya Province, on the border of the districts Ajoyani and Coasa. Jatun Pinguilluni lies southeast of a lake named Pampacocha.
