= Quimsachata (Canchis) =

Mountain in Peru

- Location within Peru

Highest point
- Elevation: 3,923 m (12,871 ft)
- Coordinates: 14.2°0′S 71.33°0′W

Geography
- Location: Cusco Region
- Parent range: Andes

Geology
- Rock age: 4450 BCE
- Mountain type: Volcano

Quimsachata (possibly from Aymara and Quechua kimsa three, Pukina chata mountain) is dormant lava dome volcano located in the Andes of Peru. It is located in the Cusco Region, Canchis Province at about 24 kilometres (15 mi) northwest of the town of Sicuani. This volcano is constructed from two separate centres, one active 11,500 years ago which formed a scoria cone and a lava field and another active 4450 BCE which formed two lava flows and a lava dome.

== Geological context ==
Volcanism in southern Peru occurs as part of two distinct volcanic systems, the stratovolcanoes of the Western Cordillera and the Altiplano volcanoes which are typically small systems with surface areas of less than 50 square kilometres (19 sq mi). Of these Altiplano volcanoes, a number of them are potassium enriched or ultrapotassic rocks and are arranged along various lineaments. One of these lineaments is associated with the Cusco and Vilcanota faults which separate the Altiplano into a western and eastern portion. Quimsachata is located along this central and still active lineament, whereas the other two lineaments on each side of the fault system were active in the Oligocene and Miocene. A variety of rock types occur in association with these lineaments.

== Geology ==
The Quimsachata group consists of two volcanoes, Quimsachata itself and Oroscocha. Situated along the foot of the Eastern Cordillera, they are the northernmost young Peruvian volcanoes and lie far away from the principal volcanic arc. Local Inka myths may refer to volcanic activity at Quimsachata, and they may have included the event into their creation myths and religious practices despite the eruption occurring long before their civilization. As of 2021 the Quimsachata volcano is unmonitored but plans to install a monitoring network exist. It is considered a "very low hazard" volcano. The area is frequented by both national and international tourists and features archeological sites.

Quimsachata was formed by a scoria cone and a lava field, next to the Vilcanota valley. It erupted about 11,500 years ago. Oroscocha (14°05′48″S 71°22′00″W) is a dome with two associated lava flows that reach thicknesses of 20 metres (66 ft). The volcano covers a surface area of 1.5 square kilometres (0.58 sq mi). Oroscocha was erupted from a fissure about 4450 BCE, and the flow modified the course of the Vilcanota river.

Oroscocha is formed by phenocryst-rich, felsic porphyritic rocks with a composition of peraluminous rhyolite in the flows and trachydacite in the dome, of which the dome is darker than the lava flows. Mafic inclusions with sizes larger in the lava flows than in the dome are also found. The magma that gave rise to the rocks was probably modified by the injection of lamprophyres while still in the magma chamber. Quimsachata is formed by potassium-rich andesite.
