= Wendell Tangborn =

American glaciologist (1927–2020)

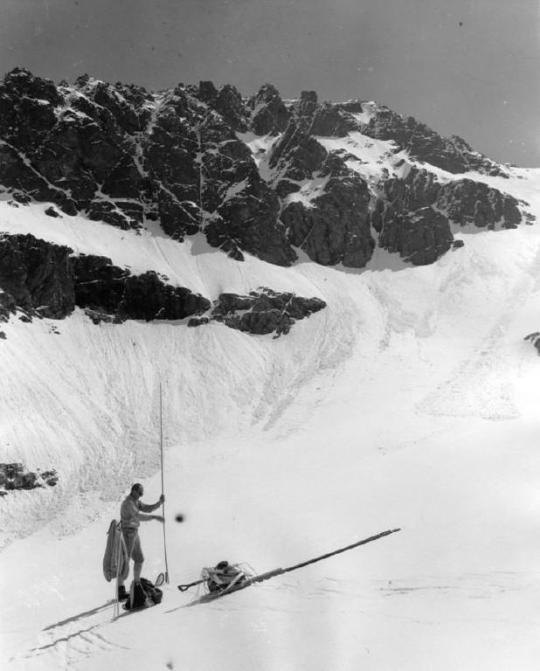
- Wendell Tangborn, South Cascade Glacier (1962)
- Born: August 22, 1927
- Died: October 3, 2020 (aged 93)
- Occupation: glaciologist
- Known for: glacier mass balance measurements

Wendell Tangborn (August 22, 1927 – October 3, 2020) was an American glaciologist specializing in glacier mass balance measurements since 1960, chiefly within the states of Washington and Alaska of the Pacific Northwest.

Tangborn's streamflow forecasting model implemented a split-sample calibration approach which greatly improved its accuracy, and eliminated the need for manual measurements such as snow surveys. This model has been utilized by hydroelectric utilities for over thirty years to forecast Columbia River runoff. His PTAA glacier balance model required only routine weather observations and has been successfully applied to calculate the mass balance of glaciers throughout the world, including the Himalayas.

Tangborn worked on a project based on the PTAAGMB Model to study and provide glacier mass balances for 150 or more glaciers around the world, The PTAAGMB Project (ptaagmb.com). He also made an effort to provide the PTAAGMB model technologies to other glaciologists and scientists, to help promote understanding and awareness of what is happening to the world's glaciers, and to help provide data that could demonstrate links between climate change and human activities.

Tangborn co-authored, among many other papers, a seminal paper that examined the hydrological budget of South Cascade Glacier (Tangborn and others, 1975). By measuring precipitation and snowmelt in the basin, the mass balance of the glacier, and the glacial runoff, he showed that the glacier stored significant volumes of water not only for weeks but perhaps for months. This was one of the few papers to quantify the hydrologic balance of a temperate glacier. Ahead of its time, it preceded by years our general understanding of increased winter and spring water storage within temperate glaciers. The intent of the paper, however, was to compare three different and commonly used methods of estimating glacier mass balance (the glaciological, hydrological and geodetic methods). As a result of the water storage processes discovered by Tangborn, this paper has contributed to a current consensus that liquid water in glaciers is a critical element for predicting and understanding the disintegration of the Greenland and Antarctic ice sheets.

Tangborn wrote the children’s book, Glaciers (recently translated into Chinese), as illustrated by Marc Simont, which introduced children to how and where glaciers form, how they move, and how they shape the land.

Wendell Tangborn is the brother of Army Silver Star recipient, Virgil John Tangborn, in whose memory Wendell published the book Appointment in Amfreville: A Memoir of Virgil Tangborn, in 2016.

== See also ==
- Glacier mass balance
- Global warming
- Greenland Ice Sheet Project
- PTAA GMB Model
