= Snow line =

Boundary between a snow-covered and snow-free surface

Climatic snow lines

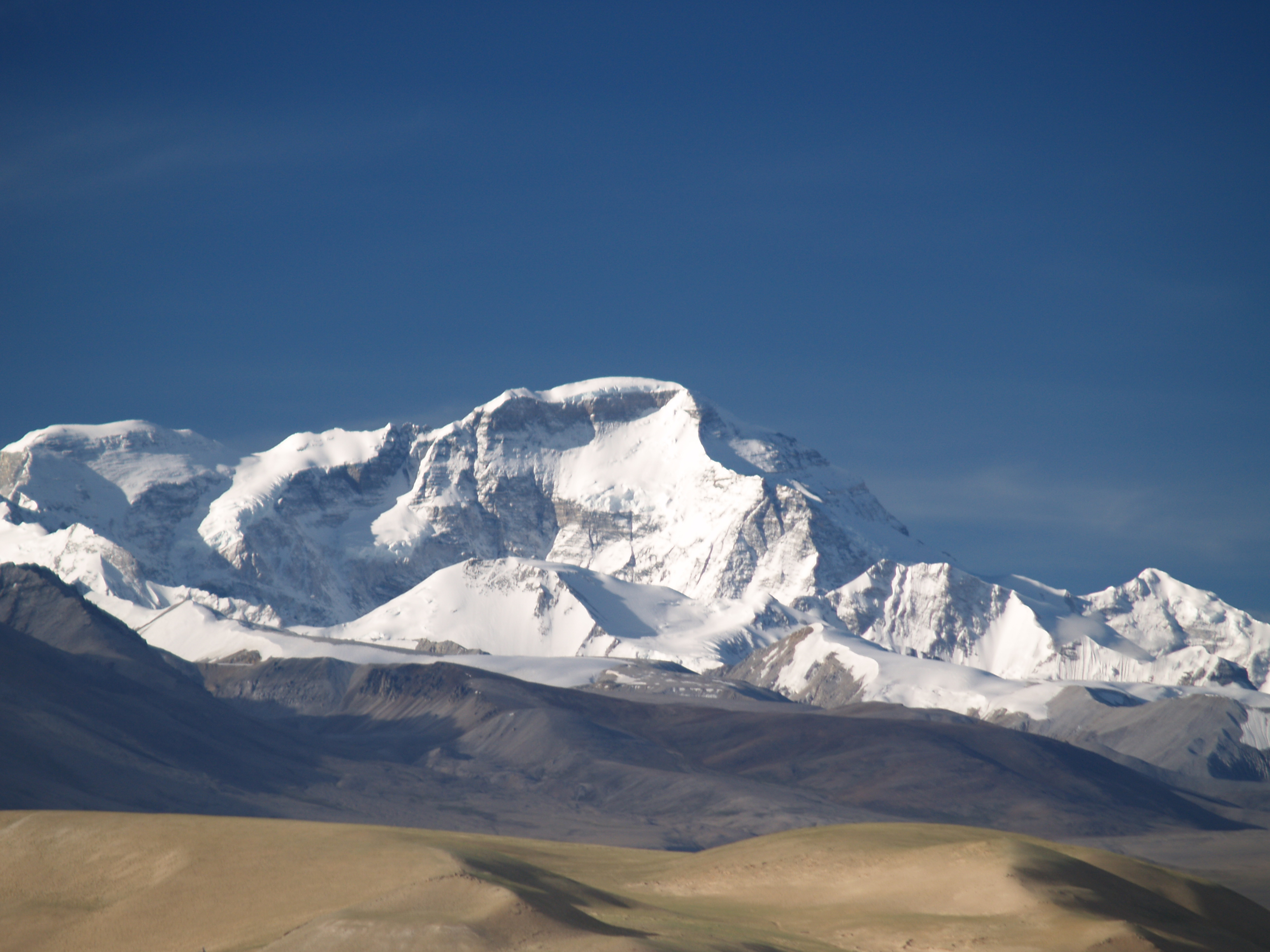
Cho Oyu (8,201 m), Himalayas: 6,000 m

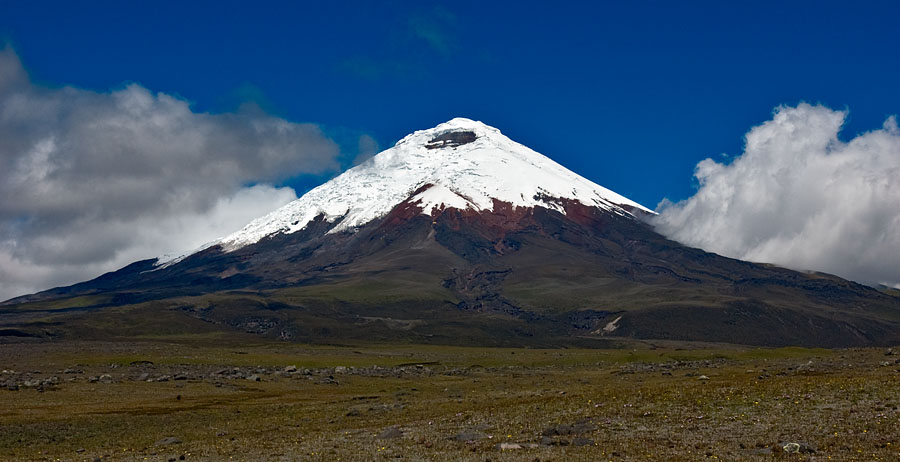
Cotopaxi (5,897 m), Andes: 5,000 m

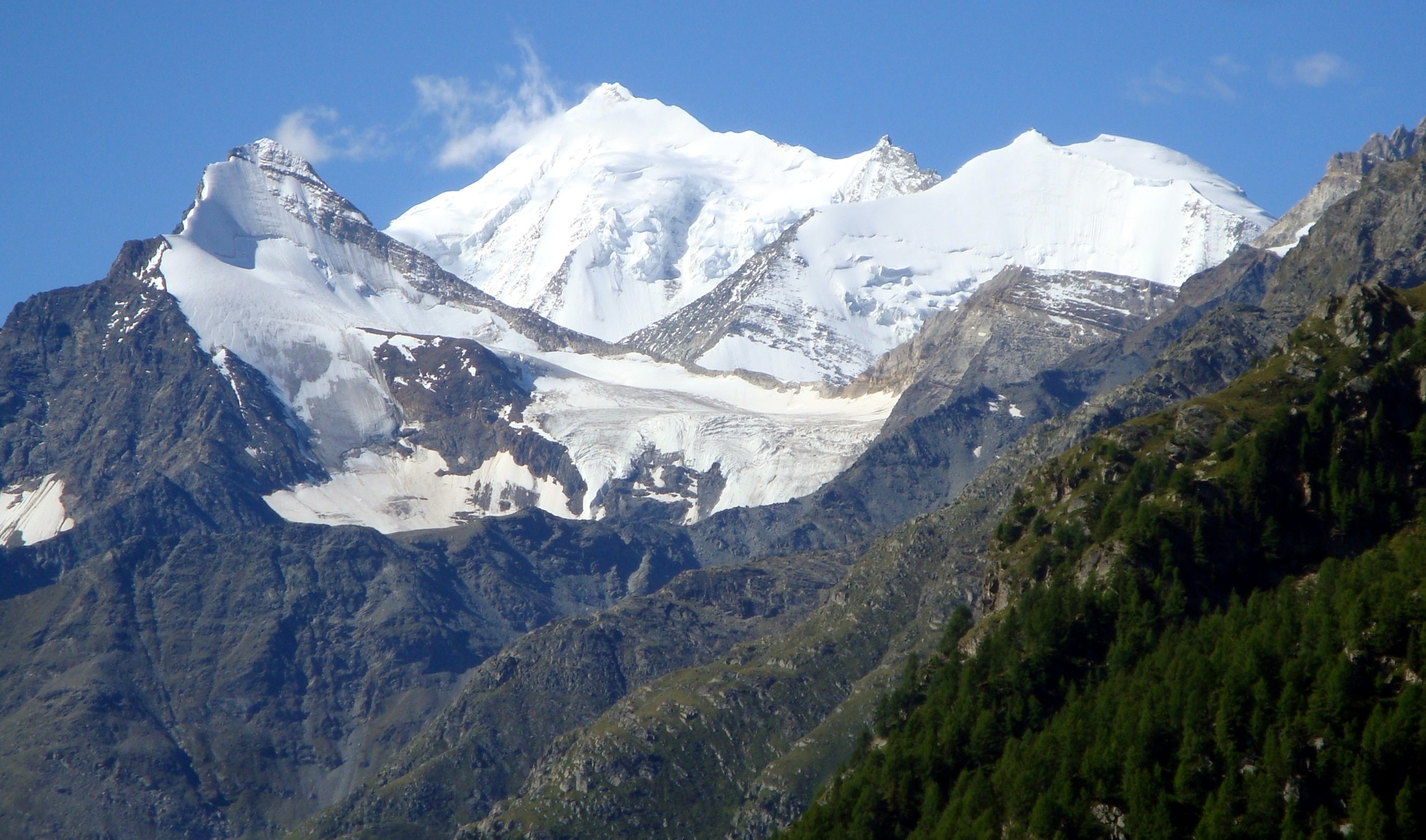
Weisshorn (4,506 m), Alps: 3,000 m

The climatic snow line is the boundary between a snow-covered and snow-free surface. The actual snow line may adjust seasonally, and be either significantly higher in elevation, or lower. The permanent snow line is the level above which snow will lie all year.

== Background ==
Snow line is an umbrella term for different interpretations of the boundary between snow-covered surface and snow-free surface. The definitions of the snow line may have different temporal and spatial focus. In many regions the changing snow line reflect seasonal dynamics. The final height of the snow line in a mountain environment at the end of the melting season is subject to climatic variability, and therefore may be different from year to year. The snow line is measured using automatic cameras, aerial photographs, or satellite images. Because the snow line can be established without on-the-ground measurements, it can be measured in remote and difficult to access areas. Therefore, the snow line has become an important variable in hydrological models.

The average elevation of a transient snow line is called the "climatic snow line" and is used as a parameter to classify regions according to climatic conditions. The boundary between the accumulation zone and the ablation zone on glaciers is called the "annual snow line". The glacier region below this snow line was subject to melting in the previous season. The term "orographic snow line" is used to describe the snow boundary on surfaces other than glaciers. The term "regional snow line" is used to describe large areas. The "permanent snow line" is the level above which snow will lie all year.

== Snow lines of global regions ==
The interplay of elevation and latitude affects the precise placement of the snow line at a particular location. At or near the equator, it is typically situated at approximately 4,500 metres (15,000 ft) above sea level. As one moves towards the Tropic of Cancer and Tropic of Capricorn, the parameter at first increases: in the Himalayas the permanent snow line can be as high as 5,700 metres (19,000 feet). Beyond the Tropics, the snow line becomes progressively lower as the latitude increases, to just below 3,000 metres (9,800 ft) in the Alps and falling all the way to sea level itself at the ice caps near the poles.

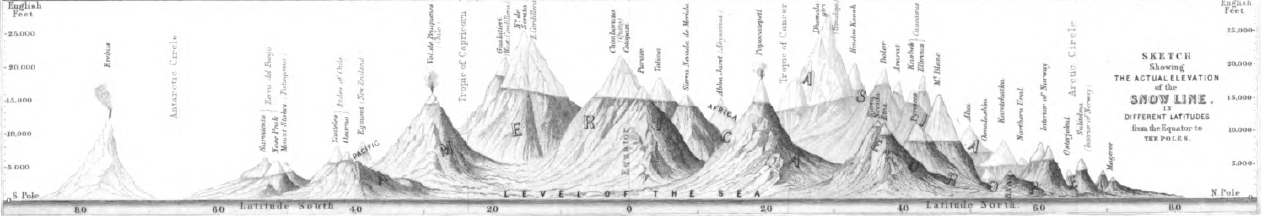
This 1848 "Sketch showing the actual elevation of the Snow Line in different Latitudes" by Alexander Keith Johnston shows the snow lines of mountains in America, Europe and Asia.

On the Tibetan Plateau, the heating of the atmosphere by the plateau means that the surface temperature is much higher than free air temperature at the same latitude and elevation. As a result, the snow line occurs at a higher elevation. The highest snow line in the northern hemisphere is found on Mount Nganglong Kangri in the western part of the plateau, at an elevation of 6,200 metres (20,000 feet).

In addition, the relative location to the nearest coastline can influence the elevation of the snow line. Areas near a coast might have a lower snow line than areas of the same elevation and latitude situated in a landmass interior due to more winter snowfall and because the average summer temperature of the surrounding lowlands would be warmer away from the sea. (This applies even in the tropics, since areas far from the sea will have larger diurnal temperature ranges and potentially less moisture, as observed with Kilimanjaro and presently glacier-free Mount Meru.) A higher elevation is therefore necessary to lower the temperature further against the surroundings and keep the snow from melting.

Furthermore, large-scale oceanic currents such as the North Atlantic Current can have significant effects over large areas (in this case warming northern Europe, extending even to some Arctic Ocean regions).

In the Northern Hemisphere the snow line on the north-facing slopes is at a lower elevation, as the north-facing slopes receive less sunlight (solar irradiance) than south-facing slopes. The converse will occur in the Southern Hemisphere.

== Glacier equilibrium line ==
The glacier equilibrium line is the point of transition between the accumulation zone and ablation zone. It is the line where the mass of these two zones is equal. Depending on the thickness of the glacier, this line can seem as though it is leaning more towards one zone but it is determined by the actual mass of ice in either zone. The rates of ablation and accumulation can also be used to determine the location of this line.

This point is an important location to use in determining whether a glacier is growing or shrinking. A higher glacier equilibrium line will indicate that the glacier is shrinking, whereas a lower line will indicate that the glacier is growing. The terminus of a glacier advances or retreats based on the location of this equilibrium line.

Scientists are using remote sensing to better estimate the locations of this line on glaciers around the world. Using satellite imagery, scientists are able to identify whether the glacier is growing or receding. This tool can be helpful for analyzing glaciers that are difficult to access, and better gauge the effects of climate change on glaciers around the world.

== Records ==
The highest mountain in the world below the snow line is Ojos del Salado.

== See also ==
- Frost line
- Frost line (astrophysics)
- Glacier
- High Alps
- Ice cap climate
- Tree line
