= Glacier terminus =

End of a glacier at any given point in time

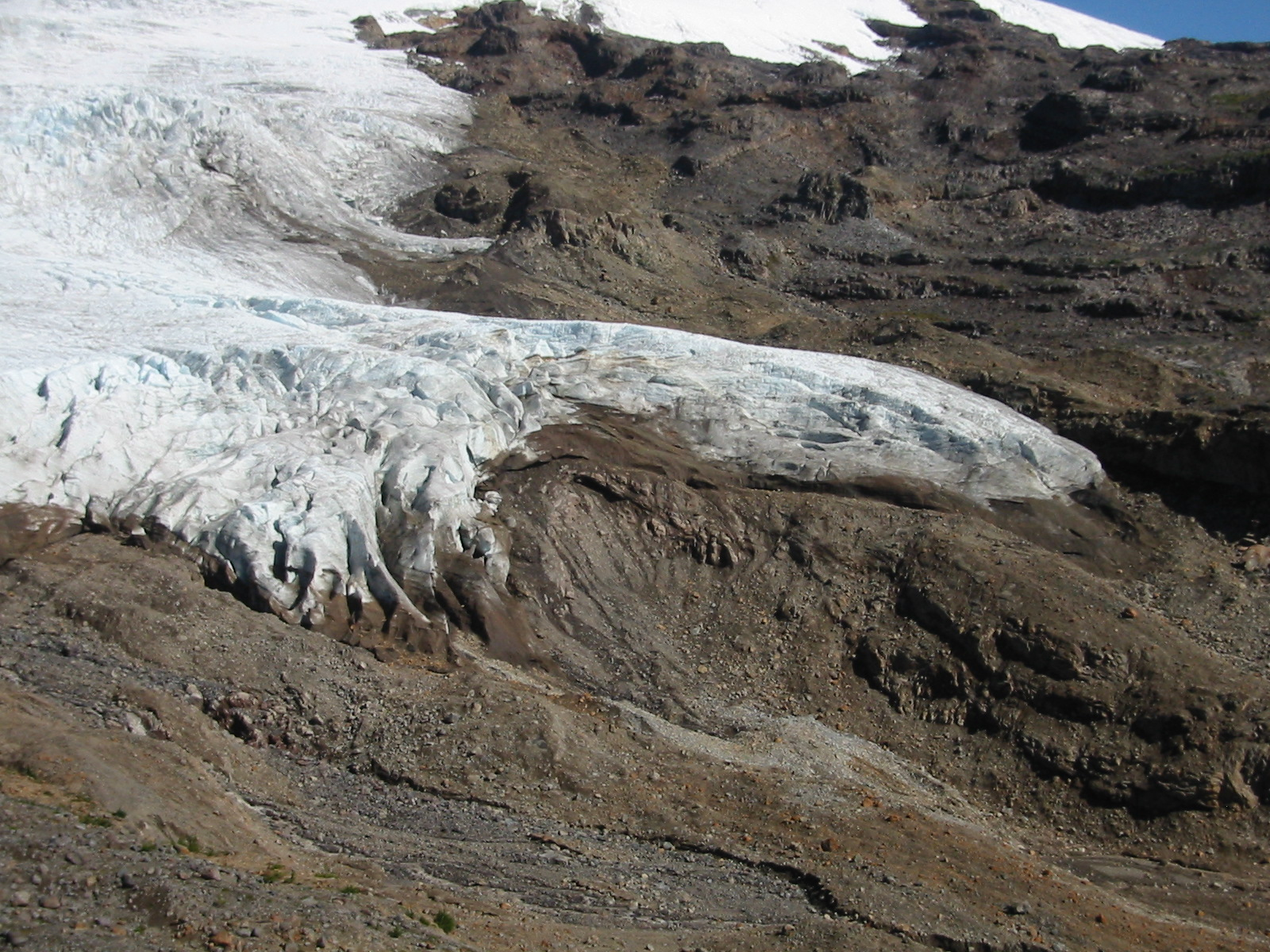
A glacial terminus

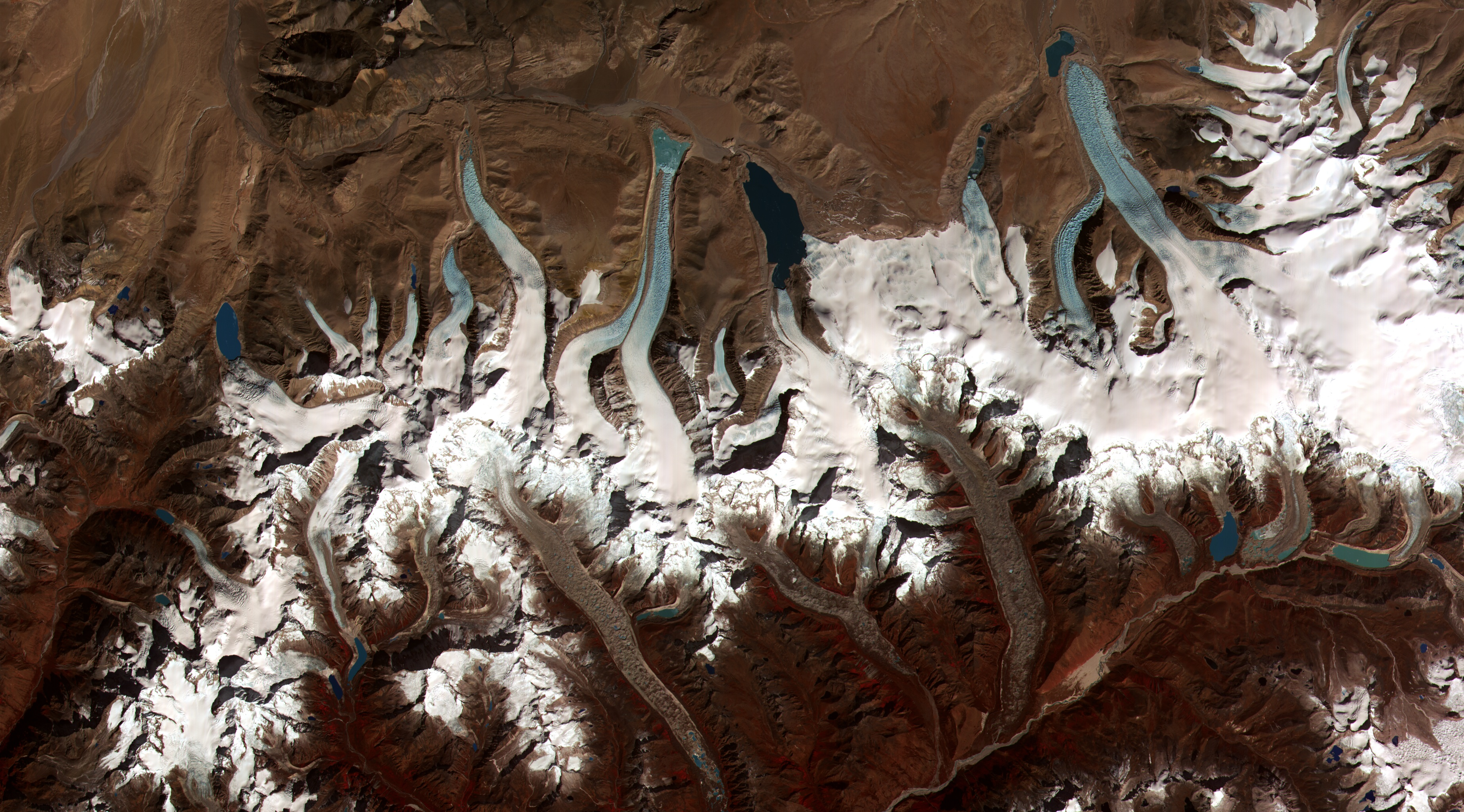
Satellite view of changing glacier termini in the Bhutan-Himalaya, showing glacial lakes formed by the retreating termini on the surface of the debris-covered glaciers over the last several decades.

A glacier terminus, toe, or snout, is the end of a glacier at any given point in time. Although glaciers seem motionless to the observer, in reality they are in endless motion and the glacier terminus is always either advancing or retreating. The location of the terminus is often directly related to glacier mass balance, which is based on the amount of snowfall which occurs in the accumulation zone of a glacier, as compared to the amount that is melted in the ablation zone. The position of a glacier terminus is also impacted by localized or regional temperature change over time.

== Tracking ==
Tracking the change in location of a glacier terminus is a method of monitoring a glacier's movement. The end of the glacier terminus is measured from a fixed position in neighboring bedrock periodically over time. The difference in location of a glacier terminus as measured from this fixed position at different time intervals provides a record of the glacier's change. A similar way of tracking glacier change is comparing photographs of the glacier's position at different times.

The form of a glacier terminus is determined by many factors. If the glacier is retreating, it is usually mildly sloping in form because a melting glacier tends to assume this shape. But there are many conditions that alter this typical shape, including the presence of thermal fields and various stresses that cause cracking and melting feedback resulting in glacial calving and other diverse forms.

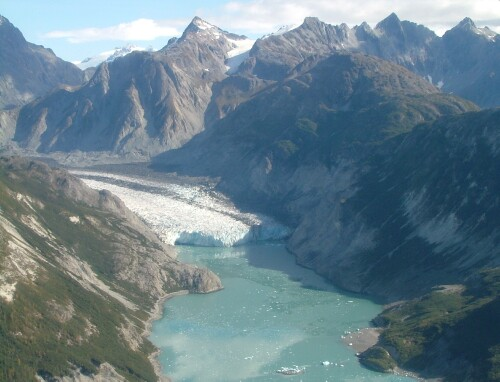

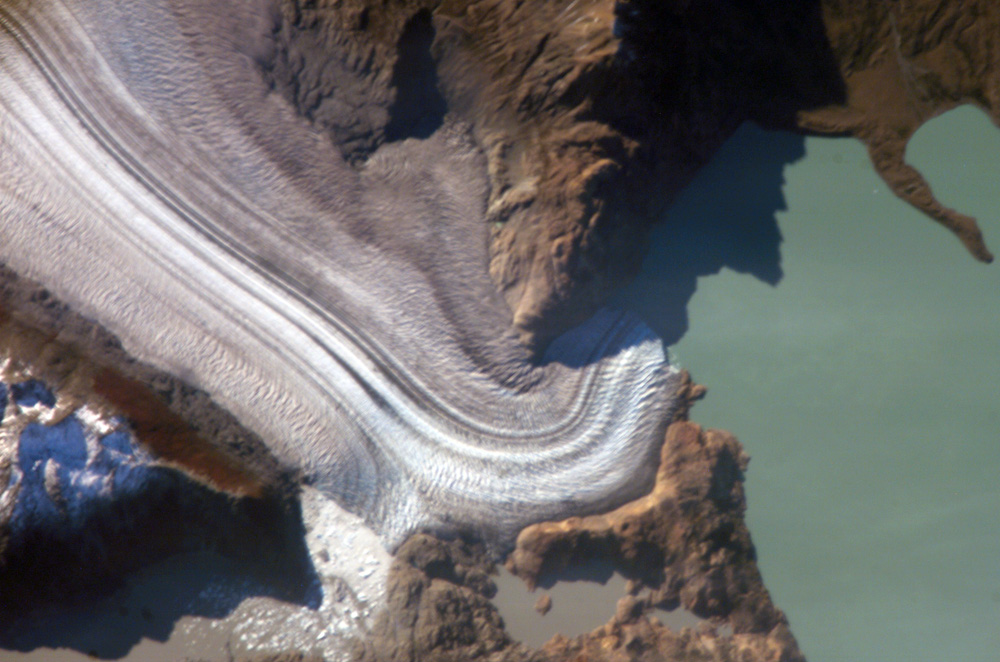

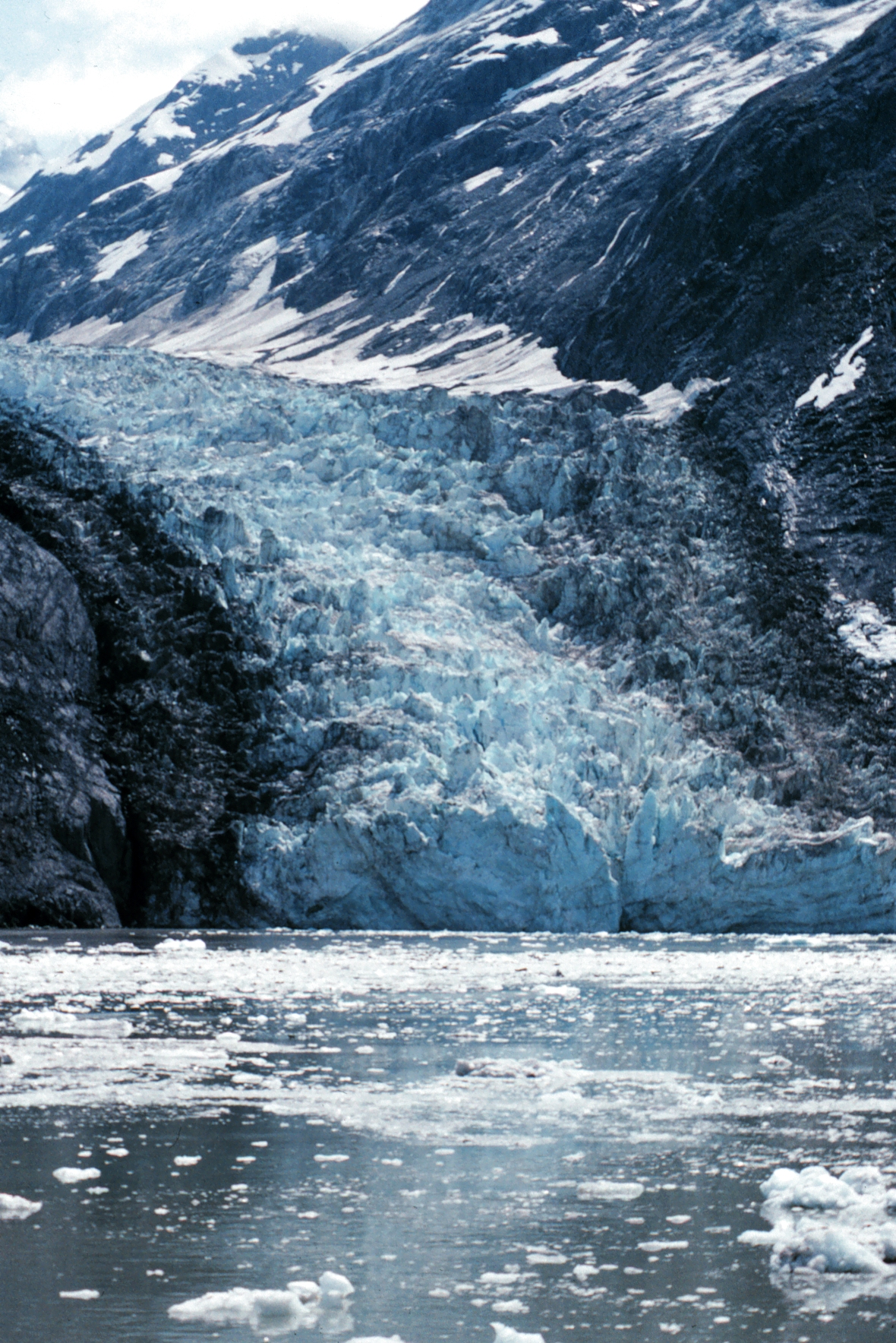

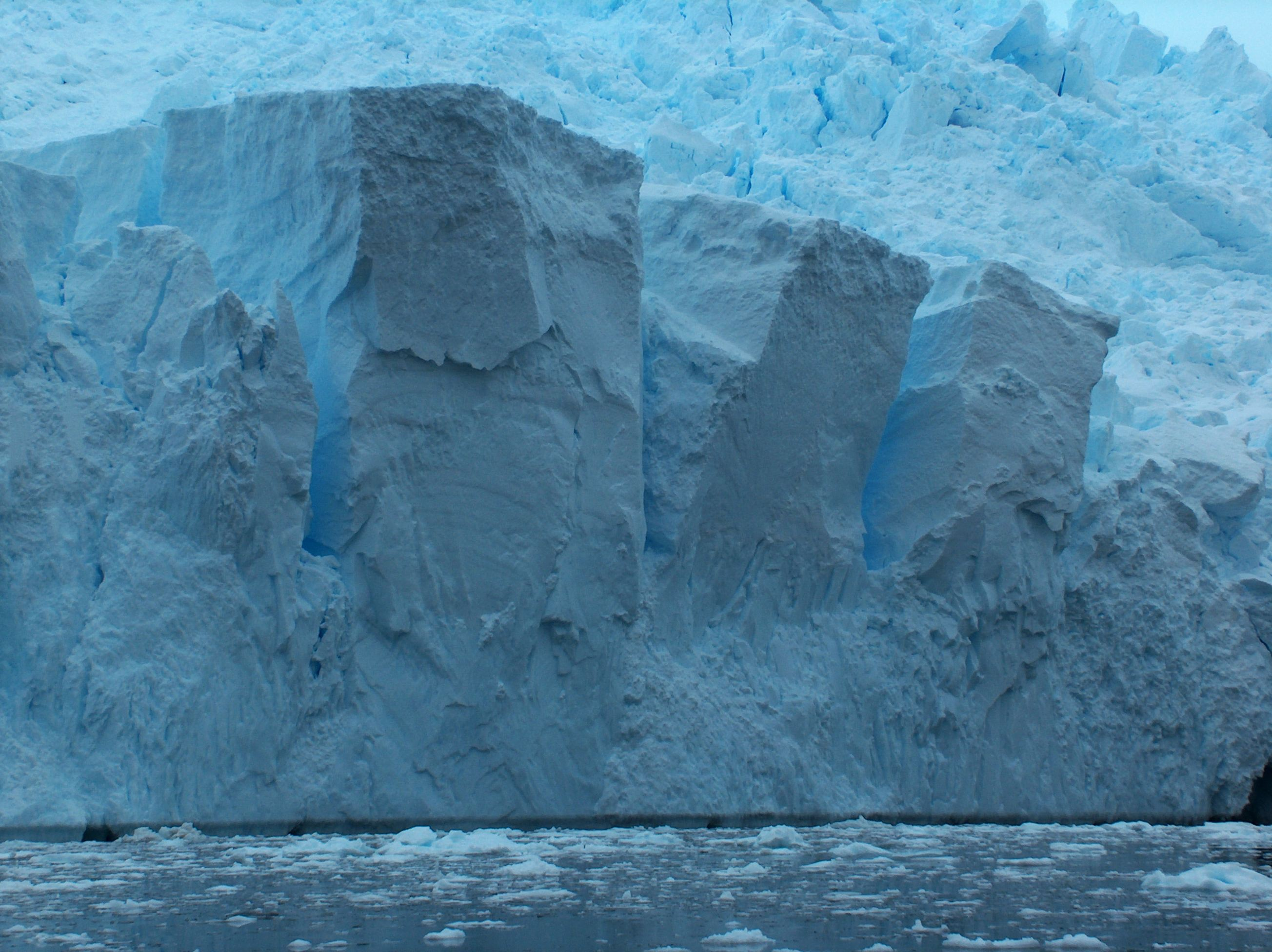
Antarctic Peninsula glacier's terminus

== See also ==
- Terminal moraine
- Boulder Glacier
- Mendenhall Glacier
- Perito Moreno Glacier
