= PTAA GMB Model =

PTAAGMB (Precipitation-Temperature-Area-Altitude Glacier Mass Balance)

== Overview ==
The PTAAGMB Model is used for calculating a glacier's mass balance, the primary indicator of its health, and plots the changes to its mass balance over time to predict its future.

Developed in the mid-1990s by glaciologist Wendell Tangborn, the PTAAGMB model provides an easy and reliable alternative to the challenging task of manually measuring glaciers using snow pits and ablation stakes.

The PTAAGMB model only requires data from the precipitation and temperature (PT) observations from nearby low-altitude weather stations and the glacier's area-altitude (AA) distribution.

== Glacier Mass Balance and Climate Change ==
Glaciers are ultra-sensitive to minute changes in the climate and respond by changing their size and by advancing or retreating. The mass balance, or the difference between snow accumulation and snow and ice ablation, is crucial to glacier health and its survival. The Columbia Glacier in Alaska is a large tidewater glacier that began a drastic retreat in the 1970s due to climate fluctuations and began discharging large quantities of icebergs into Prince William Sound. These icebergs were responsible for a massive oil spill in 1989 when an oil tanker captain tried to avoid them and went aground.

== Area-Altitude Distribution ==
The key to the PTAAGMB model is the glacier’s area-altitude distribution, which is simply the glacier’s surface area as a function of elevation. The AA profile is a unique feature of a glacier that has been shaped by thousands of years of erosion of the bedrock underlying the glacier. Thus, the area altitude distribution has embedded within it the past climate history that has formed the glacier.

The PTAAGMB model uses daily values of such balance variables as snowline altitude, zero balance altitude, glacier balance, balance flux and the accumulation area ratio are correlated throughout the ablation season using two-degree polynomial regressions to obtain the lowest fitting error. When the minimum average error (or maximum R2) is attained, the generated balances and other variables are considered to be real. A simplex optimization technique is used to determine the optimal coefficient values that are used in algorithms to convert meteorological observations to snow accumulation and snow and ice ablation.

== Application to Glaciers ==
The PTAAGMB model has been used successfully on a number of glaciers in various parts of the world: in the United States, the Alaskan glaciers Bering, Gulkana, Lemon Creek, Mendenhall, Wolverine and Wrangell Range; in Washington State, on the South Cascade Glacier; in Europe, the Austrian glaciers Hintereisferner, Kesselwanferner and Vernagt Ferner.

The mass balance and runoff of Langtang Glacier in Nepal was determined with the PTAAGMB model using daily meteorological observations observed at Kathmandu. This is the only Himalayan glacier for which mass balance and runoff have been calculated.

== Glacier Thickness Calculation ==
Another feature of the PTAAGMB model is the capability to estimate glacier thickness from ice flow velocity and mass balance measurements. The average thickness of South Cascade Glacier was found to be 83 meters in 1965, based on flow velocity and balance measurements. Borehole depth measurements of the glacier made later approximately agree with this estimate.

== Mass Balance, Runoff and Surge Calculation ==
The mass balance, runoff and surges of Bering Glacier were calculated with the PTAAGMB model using weather observations at Cordova and Yakutat, Alaska. Ice volume loss measured with the PTAAGMB model agrees within 0.8% of the loss measured with the geodetic method. Runoff from Bering Glacier (derived from simulated ablation and rain) correlates with four of the glacier surges that have occurred since 1951.

== Comparison of Mass Balance Methods ==
Comparison of glacier mass balance by glaciological, hydrological and mapping methods revealed that glaciers internally store a significant amount of liquid water. Stored water in glaciers is now considered the key to understanding the disintegration of Antarctic and Greenland Ice Caps.

== More Information ==
A website with PTAAGMB results reported from 9 different glaciers, 5 of which are compared with available manual measurements, can be seen at www.ptaagmb.com.

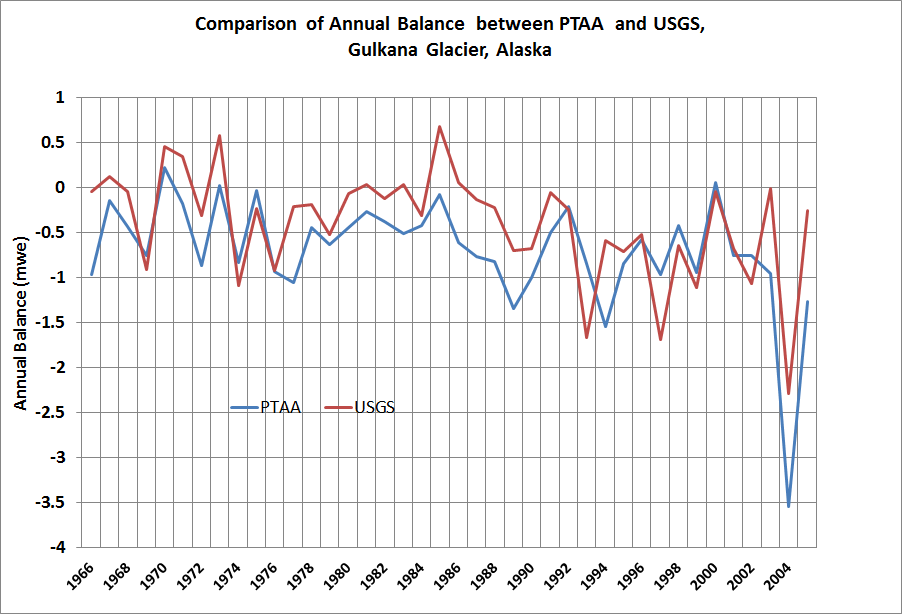
PTAAGMB Model vs. Manual Measurements Comparison Chart

== See also ==
- Glacier mass balance
