= Glacier mass balance =

Difference between accumulation and melting on a glacier

Globally in recent decades, the mass of glaciers has persistently declined, with the rate of annual loss accelerating.

In these "reference glaciers", seasonal glacier melt contributes to runoff; the annual balance (net change of glacier mass) contributes to sea level rise.

A glacier's mass balance or surface mass balance (SMB)—the difference between accumulation and ablation (sublimation and melting)—is crucial to the survival of the glacier. Climate change may cause variations in both temperature and snowfall, causing changes in the surface mass balance. Changes in mass balance control a glacier's long-term behavior and are the most sensitive climate indicators on a glacier. From 1980 to 2012, the mean cumulative mass loss of glaciers reporting mass balance to the World Glacier Monitoring Service is −16 m. This includes 23 consecutive years of negative mass balances.

A glacier with a sustained negative balance is out of equilibrium and will retreat, while one with a sustained positive balance is out of equilibrium and will advance. Glacier retreat results in the loss of the low elevation region of the glacier. Since higher elevations are cooler than lower ones, the disappearance of the lowest portion of the glacier reduces overall ablation, thereby increasing mass balance and potentially reestablishing equilibrium. However, if the mass balance of a significant portion of the accumulation zone of the glacier is negative, it is in disequilibrium with the local climate. Such a glacier will melt away with a continuation of this local climate. The key symptom of a glacier in disequilibrium is thinning along the entire length of the glacier. For example, Easton Glacier (pictured below) will likely shrink to half its size, but at a slowing rate of reduction, and stabilize at that size, despite the warmer temperature, over a few decades. However, the Grinnell Glacier (pictured below) will shrink at an increasing rate until it disappears. The difference is that the upper section of Easton Glacier remains healthy and snow-covered, while even the upper section of the Grinnell Glacier is bare, melting and has thinned. Small glaciers with shallow slopes such as Grinnell Glacier are most likely to fall into disequilibrium if there is a change in the local climate.

In the case of positive mass balance, the glacier will continue to advance expanding its low elevation area, resulting in more melting. If this still does not create an equilibrium balance the glacier will continue to advance. If a glacier is near a large body of water, especially an ocean, the glacier may advance until iceberg calving losses bring about equilibrium.

== Definitions ==
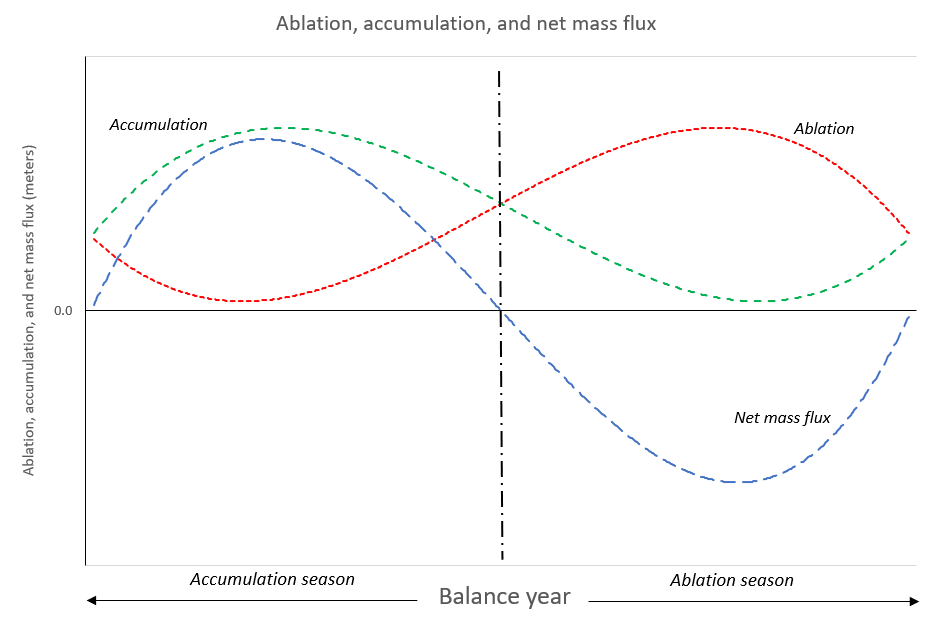
Accumulation, ablation (shown here as positive), and the net mass flux of a glacier (the sum of both, with ablation taken to be negative). A balance year is the combination of an accumulation season and an ablation season.

=== Accumulation ===
The different processes by which a glacier can gain mass are collectively known as accumulation. Snowfall is the most obvious form of accumulation. Avalanches, particularly in steep mountain environments, can also add mass to a glacier. Other methods include deposition of wind-blown snow; the freezing of liquid water, including rainwater and meltwater; deposition of frost in various forms; and the expansion of a floating area of ice by the freezing of additional ice to it. Snowfall is the predominant form of accumulation overall, but in specific situations other processes may be more important; for example, avalanches can be much more important than snowfall in small cirque basins.

Accumulation can be measured at a single point on the glacier, or for any area of the glacier. The units of accumulation are meters: 1 meter accumulation means that the additional mass of ice for that area, if turned to water, would increase the depth of the glacier by 1 meter. (Note: The accumulation can also be expressed in terms of the mass, or of the depth of ice that the mass would form. The latter is commonly used in studies of ice dynamics.)

=== Ablation ===
Ablation is the reverse of accumulation: it includes all the processes by which a glacier can lose mass. The main ablation process for most glaciers that are entirely land-based is melting; the heat that causes melting can come from sunlight, or ambient air, or from rain falling on the glacier, or from geothermal heat below the glacier bed. Sublimation of ice to vapor is an important ablation mechanism for glaciers in arid environments, high altitudes, and very cold environments, and can account for all the surface ice loss in some cases, such as the Taylor Glacier in the Transantarctic Mountains. Sublimation consumes a great deal of energy, compared to melting, so high levels of sublimation have the effect of reducing overall ablation.

Snow can also be eroded from glaciers by wind, and avalanches can remove snow and ice; these can be important in some glaciers. Calving, in which ice detaches from the snout of a glacier that terminates in water, forming icebergs, is a significant form of ablation for many glaciers.

As with accumulation, ablation can also be measured in meters either at a single point on the glacier, or for any area of the glacier.

=== Rates, mass flux, and balance year ===
Glaciers typically accumulate mass during part of the year, and lose mass the rest of the year; these are the "accumulation season" and "ablation season" respectively. This definition means that the accumulation rate is greater than the ablation rate during the accumulation season, and during the ablation season the reverse is true. A "balance year" is defined as the time between two consecutive minima in the glaciers mass—that is, from the start of one accumulation season through to the start of the next. The snow surface at these minima, where snow begins to accumulate again at the start of each accumulation season, is identifiable in the stratigraphy of the snow, so using balance years to measure glacier mass balance is known as the stratigraphic method. The alternative is to use a fixed calendar date, but this requires a field visit to the glacier each year on that date, and so it is not always possible to strictly adhere to the exact dates for the fixed year method.

=== Mass balance ===
The mass balance of a glacier is the net change in its mass over a balance year or fixed year. If accumulation exceeds ablation for a given year, the mass balance is positive; if the reverse is true, the mass balance is negative. These terms can be applied to a particular point on the glacier to give the "specific mass balance" for that point or to the entire glacier or any smaller area.

For many glaciers, accumulation is concentrated in winter, and ablation in the summer; these are referred to as "winter-accumulation" glaciers. For some glaciers, the local climate leads to accumulation and ablation both occurring in the same season. These are known as "summer-accumulation" glaciers; examples are found in the Himalayas and Tibet. The layers that make winter-accumulation glaciers easy to monitor via the stratigraphic method are not usable, so fixed date monitoring is preferable.

=== Equilibrium line ===
For winter-accumulation glaciers, the specific mass balance is usually positive for the upper part of the glacier—in other words, the accumulation area of the glacier is the upper part of its surface. The line dividing the accumulation area from the ablation area—the lower part of the glacier—is called the equilibrium line; it is the line at which the specific net balance is zero. The altitude of the equilibrium line, abbreviated as ELA, is a key indicator of the health of the glacier; and since the ELA is usually easier to measure than the overall mass balance of the glacier it is often taken as a proxy for the mass balance.

=== Symbols ===
The most frequently used standard variables in mass-balance research are:

- a – ablation
- c – accumulation
- b – mass balance (c + a)
- ρ – density
- h – glacier thickness
- S – area
- V – volume
- AAR – accumulation-area ratio
- ELA – equilibrium-line altitude

By default, a term in lower case refers to the value at a specific point on the glacier's surface; a term in upper case refers to the value across the entire glacier.

== Measurement methods ==
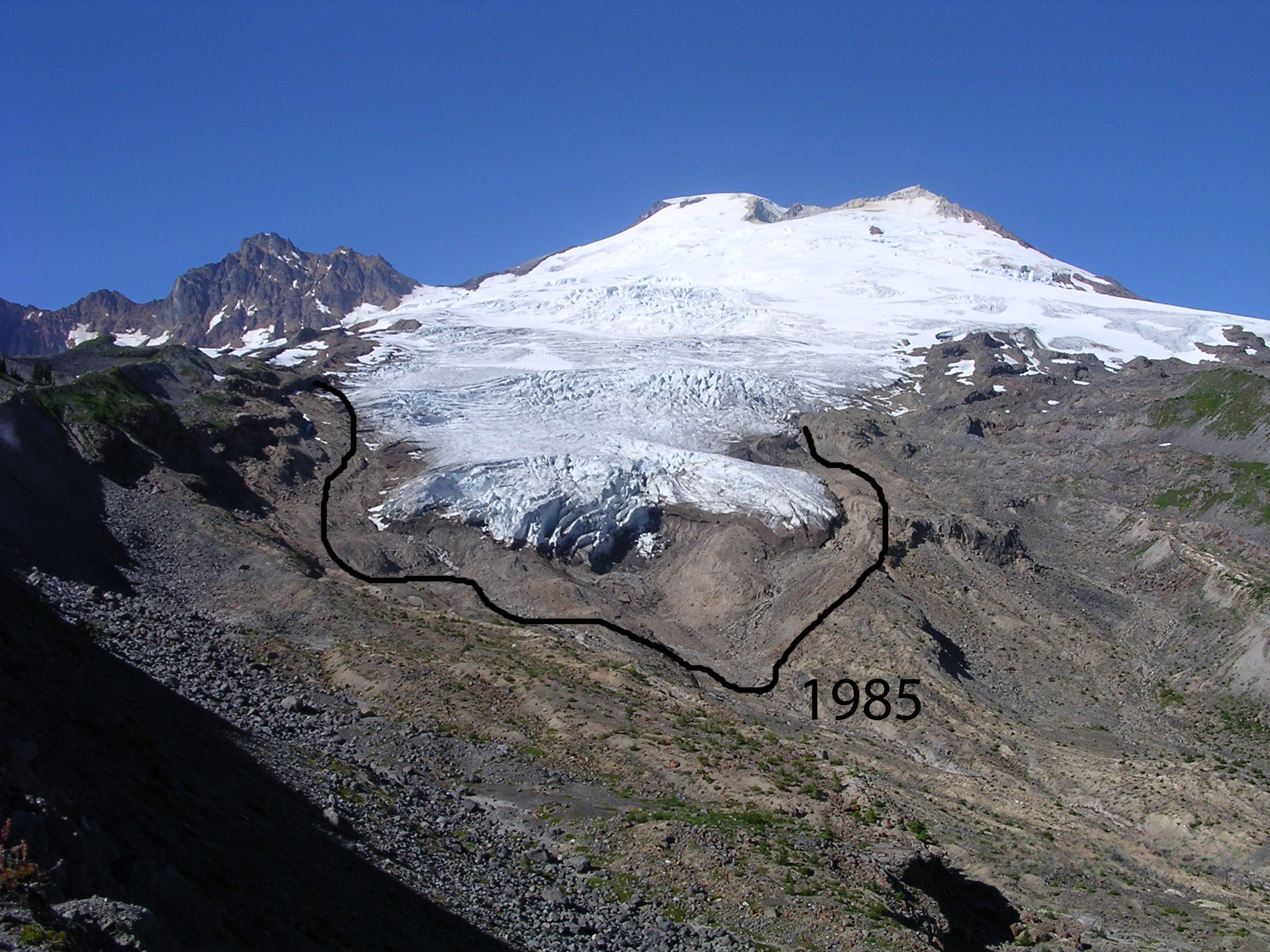
The Easton Glacier, which retreated 255 m from 1990 to 2005, is expected to achieve equilibrium.

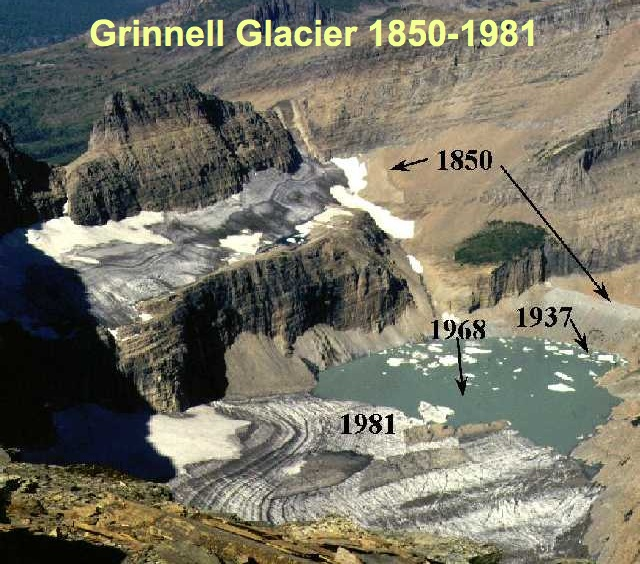
Grinnell Glacier in Glacier National Park (U.S.) showing recession since 1850 of 1.1 km USGS

=== Mass balance ===
To determine mass balance in the accumulation zone, snowpack depth is measured using probing, snowpits or crevasse stratigraphy. Crevasse stratigraphy makes use of annual layers revealed on the wall of a crevasse. Akin to tree rings, these layers are due to summer dust deposition and other seasonal effects. The advantage of crevasse stratigraphy is that it provides a two-dimensional measurement of the snowpack layer, not a point measurement. It is also usable in depths where probing or snowpits are not feasible. In temperate glaciers, the insertion resistance of a probe increases abruptly when its tip reaches ice that was formed the previous year. The probe depth is a measure of the net accumulation above that layer. Snowpits dug through the past winters residual snowpack are used to determine the snowpack depth and density. The snowpack's mass balance is the product of density and depth. Regardless of depth measurement technique the observed depth is multiplied by the snowpack density to determine the accumulation in water equivalent. It is necessary to measure the density in the spring as snowpack density varies. Measurement of snowpack density completed at the end of the ablation season yield consistent values for a particular area on temperate alpine glaciers and need not be measured every year. In the ablation zone, ablation measurements are made using stakes inserted vertically into the glacier either at the end of the previous melt season or the beginning of the current one. The length of stake exposed by melting ice is measured at the end of the melt (ablation) season. Most stakes must be replaced each year or even midway through the summer.

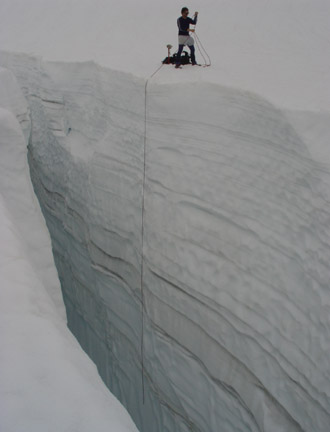
Measuring snowpack in a crevasse on the Easton Glacier, North Cascades, US, the two-dimensional nature of the annual layers is apparent.

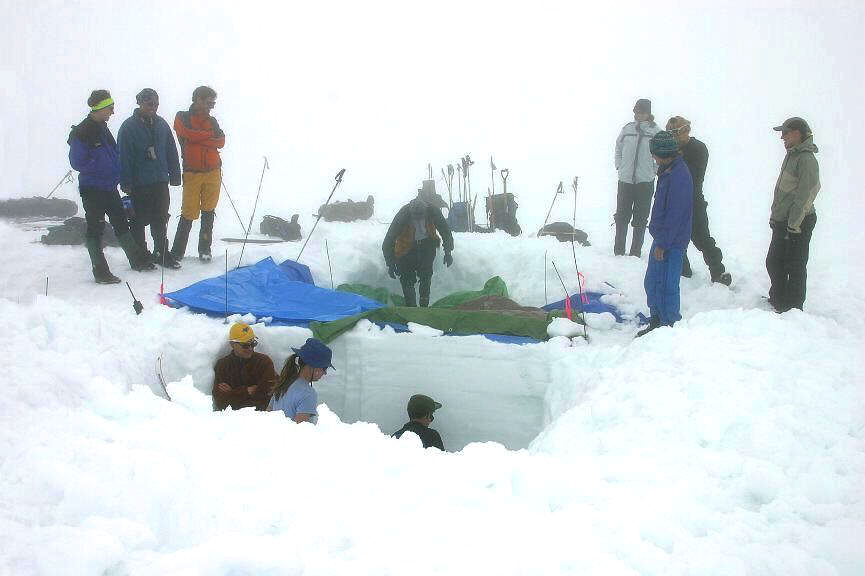
Measuring snowpack on the Taku Glacier in Alaska. This is a slow and inefficient process, but is very accurate.

=== Net balance ===
Net balance is the mass balance determined between successive mass balance minimums. This is the stratigraphic method focusing on the minima representing a stratigraphic horizon. In the northern mid-latitudes, a glacier's year follows the hydrologic year, starting and ending near the beginning of October. The mass balance minimum is the end of the melt season. The net balance is then the sum of the observed winter balance (bw) normally measured in April or May and summer balance (bs) measured in September or early October.

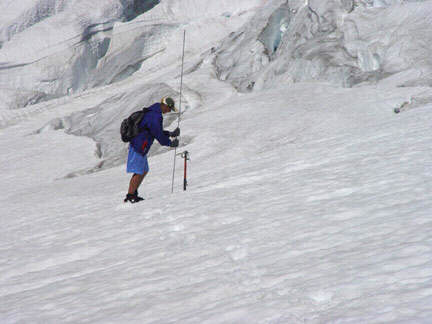
Measuring snowpack on the Easton Glacier by probing to the previous impenetrable surface. This provides a quick accurate point measurement of snowpack.

=== Annual balance ===
Annual balance is the mass balance measured between specific dates. The mass balance is measured on the fixed date each year, again sometime near the start of October in the mid northern latitudes.

=== Geodetic methods ===
Geodetic methods are an indirect method for the determination of mass balance of glacier. Maps of a glacier made at two different points in time can be compared, and the difference in glacier thickness observed is used to determine the mass balance over a span of years. This is best accomplished today using Differential Global Positioning System. Sometimes the earliest data for the glacier surface profiles is from images that are used to make topographical maps and digital elevation models. Aerial mapping or photogrammetry is now used to cover larger glaciers and icecaps such as the ones found in Antarctica and Greenland,. However, because of the problems of establishing accurate ground control points in mountainous terrain, and correlating features in snow and where shading is common, elevation errors are typically not less than 10 m (32 ft). Laser altimetry provides a measurement of the elevation of a glacier along a specific path, e.g., the glacier centerline. The difference of two such measurements is the change in thickness, which provides mass balance over the time interval between the measurements.

=== Satellite Gravimetry ===
Satellite Gravimetry is a technique that leverages Earth's gravitational field measured by satellites. When there is a change in glacier mass, the mass distribution on Earth also changes as a result, which can alter Earth's gravitational field. Satellites such as GRACE and GRACE-FO measure these changes in Earth's gravity field, allowing for the estimate of glacier mass loss or gain. In order to make such measurements, two satellites travel together along the same orbit. When the leading satellite encounters a region with a higher mass, for example, the strong gravitational pull from the region accelerates it, ultimately increasing the distance between the two satellites - these variations are then used to determine the changes in mass balance. While satellite gravimetry is useful for measuring glacier mass change at a larger, global scale, the limitation is that it is unable to resolve small, individual glaciers due to its large spatial resolution.

=== Machine Learning Approaches ===
More recently, various machine learning approaches have been developed to estimate glacier mass balance, especially for those regions whose data is not easily measurable or available. In some glaciers, mass balance data is sparse, so it can be difficult to make accurate predictions on mass balance using traditional methodologies. Some alternative measurement technologies that leverage existing data and machine learning include Mass Balance Machine (MBM) and miniML-MB, both of which use eXtreme Gradient Boosting to make predictions. MiniML-MB, in particular, uses temperature and precipitation to predict annual point surface mass balance, which performs with mean absolute error of only 0.417m.

== Mass balance research worldwide ==
Projections: Melting of glacial mass is approximately linearly related to temperature increase. Based on current national pledges, global mean temperature is projected to increase by +2.7 °C over the pre-industrial era, which would cause loss of about half of Earth's glaciers by 2100 with a sea level rise of 115±40 millimeters.

Mass balance studies have been carried out in various countries worldwide, but have mostly conducted in the Northern Hemisphere due to there being more mid-latitude glaciers in that hemisphere. The World Glacier Monitoring Service annually compiles the mass balance measurements from around the world. From 2002 to 2006, continuous data is available for only 7 glaciers in the southern hemisphere and 76 glaciers in the Northern Hemisphere. The mean balance of these glaciers was its most negative in any year for 2005/06. The similarity of response of glaciers in western North America indicates the large scale nature of the driving climate change.

=== Alaska ===
The Taku Glacier near Juneau, Alaska has been studied by the Juneau Icefield Research Program since 1946, and is the longest continuous mass balance study of any glacier in North America. Taku is the world's thickest known temperate alpine glacier, and experienced positive mass balance between the years 1946 and 1988, resulting in a huge advance. The glacier has since had a negative mass balance trend. The Juneau Icefield Research Program also has studied the mass balance of the Lemon Creek Glacier since 1953. The glacier has had an average annual balance of −0.44 m per year from 1953 to 2006, resulting in a mean loss of over 27 m of ice thickness. This loss has been confirmed by laser altimetry.

=== Austrian Glacier Mass Balance ===
The mass balance of Hintereisferner and Kesselwandferner glaciers in Austria have been continuously monitored since 1952 and 1965 respectively. Having been continuously measured for 55 years, Hintereisferner has one of the longest periods of continuous study of any glacier in the world, based on measured data and a consistent method of evaluation. Currently this measurement network comprises about 10 snow pits and about 50 ablation stakes distributed across the glacier. In terms of the cumulative specific balances, Hintereisferner experienced a net loss of mass between 1952 and 1964, followed by a period of recovery to 1968. Hintereisferner reached an intermittent minimum in 1976, briefly recovered in 1977 and 1978 and has continuously lost mass in the 30 years since then. Total mass loss has been 26 m since 1952 Sonnblickkees Glacier has been measured since 1957 and the glacier has lost 12 m of mass, an average annual loss of −0.23 m per year.

=== New Zealand ===
Glacier mass balance studies have been ongoing in New Zealand since 1957. Tasman Glacier has been studied since then by the New Zealand Geological Survey and later by the Ministry of Works, measuring the ice stratigraphy and overall movement. However, even earlier fluctuation patterns were documented on the Franz Josef and Fox Glaciers in 1950. Other glaciers on the South Island studied include Ivory Glacier since 1968, while on the North Island, glacier retreat and mass balance research has been conducted on the glaciers on Mount Ruapehu since 1955. On Mount Ruapehu, permanent photographic stations allow repeat photography to be used to provide photographic evidence of changes to the glaciers on the mountain over time.

An aerial photographic survey of 50 glaciers in the South Island has been carried out for most years since 1977. The data was used to show that between 1976 and 2005 there was a 10% loss in glacier volume.

=== North Cascade glacier mass balance program ===
The North Cascade Glacier Climate Project measures the annual balance of 10 glaciers, more than any other program in North America, to monitor an entire glaciated mountain range, which was listed as a high priority of the National Academy of Sciences in 1983. These records extend from 1984 to 2008 and represent the only set of records documenting the mass balance changes of an entire glacier clad range. North Cascade glaciers annual balance has averaged −0.48 m/a from 1984 to 2008, a cumulative thickness loss of over 13 m or 20–40% of their total volume since 1984 due to negative mass balances. The trend in mass balance is becoming more negative which is fueling more glacier retreat and thinning.

=== Norway mass balance program ===
Norway maintains the most extensive mass balance program in the world and is largely funded by the hydropower industry. Mass balance measurements are currently (2012) performed on fifteen glaciers in Norway. In southern Norway six of the glaciers have been measured continuously since 1963 or earlier, and they constitute a west–east profile reaching from the maritime Ålfotbreen Glacier, close to the western coast, to the continental Gråsubreen Glacier, in the eastern part of Jotunheimen. Storbreen Glacier in Jotunheimen has been measured for a longer period of time than any other glacier in Norway, starting in 1949, while Engabreen Glacier at Svartisen has the longest series in northern Norway (starting in 1970). The Norwegian program is where the traditional methods of mass balance measurement were largely derived.

=== Sweden Storglaciären ===
The Tarfala research station in the Kebnekaise region of northern Sweden is operated by Stockholm University. It was here that the first mass balance program was initiated immediately after World War II, and continues to the present day. This survey was the initiation of the mass balance record of Storglaciären Glacier, and constitutes the longest continuous study of this type in the world. Storglaciären has had a cumulative negative mass balance from 1946 to 2006 of −17 m. The program began monitoring the Rabots Glaciär in 1982, Riukojietna in 1985, and Mårmaglaciären in 1988. All three of these glaciers have had a strong negative mass balance since initiation.

=== Iceland Glacier mass balance ===
Glacier mass balance is measured once or twice annually on numerous stakes on the several ice caps in Iceland by the National Energy Authority. Regular pit and stake mass-balance measurements have been carried out on the northern side of Hofsjökull since 1988 and likewise on the Þrándarjökull since 1991. Profiles of mass balance (pit and stake) have been established on the eastern and south-western side of Hofsjökull since 1989. Similar profiles have been assessed on the Tungnaárjökull, Dyngjujökull, Köldukvíslarjökull and Brúarjökull outlet glaciers of Vatnajökull since 1992 and the Eyjabakkajökull outlet glacier since 1991.

=== Swiss mass balance program ===
Temporal changes in the spatial distribution of the mass balance result primarily from changes in accumulation and melt along the surface. As a consequence, variations in the mass of glaciers reflect changes in climate and the energy fluxes at the Earth's surface. The Swiss glaciers Gries in the central Alps and Silvretta in the eastern Alps, have been measured for many years. The distribution of seasonal accumulation and ablation rates are measured in-situ. Traditional field methods are combined with remote sensing techniques to track changes in mass, geometry and the flow behaviour of the two glaciers. These investigations contribute to the Swiss Glacier Monitoring Network and the International network of the World Glacier Monitoring Service (WGMS).

=== United States Geological Survey (USGS) ===
The USGS operates a long-term "benchmark" glacier monitoring program which is used to examine climate change, glacier mass balance, glacier motion, and stream runoff. This program has been ongoing since 1965 and has been examining three glaciers in particular. Gulkana Glacier in the Alaska Range and Wolverine Glacier in the Coast Ranges of Alaska have both been monitored since 1965, while the South Cascade Glacier in Washington State has been continuously monitored since the International Geophysical Year of 1957. This program monitors one glacier in each of these mountain ranges, collecting detailed data to understand glacier hydrology and glacier climate interactions.

=== Geological Survey of Canada-Glaciology Section (GSC) ===
The GSC operates Canada's Glacier-Climate Observing System as part of its Climate Change Geoscience Program. With its university partners, it conducts monitoring and research on glacier-climate changes, water resources and sea level change using a network of reference observing sites located in the Cordillera and the Canadian Arctic Archipelago. This network is augmented with remote sensing assessments of regional glacier changes. Sites in the Cordillera include the Helm, Place, Andrei, Kaskakwulsh, Haig, Peyto, Ram River, Castle Creek, Kwadacha and Bologna Creek Glaciers; in the Arctic Archipelago include the White, Baby and Grise Glaciers and the Devon, Meighen, Melville and Agassiz Ice Caps. GSC reference sites are monitored using the standard stake based glaciological method (stratigraphic) and periodic geodetic assessments using airborne lidar. Detailed information, contact information and database available here: Helm Glacier (−33 m) and Place Glacier (−27 m) have lost more than 20% of their entire volume, since 1980, Peyto Glacier (−20 m) is close to this amount. The Canadian Arctic White Glacier has not been as negative at (−6 m) since 1980.

=== Bolivia mass balance network ===
The glacier monitoring network in Bolivia, a branch of the glacio-hydrological system of observation installed throughout the tropical Andes Mountains by IRD and partners since 1991, has monitored mass balance on Zongo (6000 m asl), Chacaltaya (5400 m asl) and Charquini glaciers (5380 m asl). A system of stakes has been used, with frequent field observations, as often as monthly. These measurements have been made in concert with energy balance to identify the cause of the rapid retreat and mass balance loss of these tropical glaciers.

=== Mass balance in former USSR ===
Nowadays, glaciological stations exist in Russia and Kazakhstan. In Russia there are two stations: Glacier Djankuat in Caucasus, is located near the mountain Elbrus, and Glacier Aktru in Altai Mountains. In Kazakhstan there is glaciological station in Glacier Tuyuk-Su, in Tian Shan, is located near the city of Almaty.

=== PTAA-Mass balance model ===
A recently developed glacier balance model based on Monte Carlo principals is a promising supplement to both manual field measurements and geodetic methods of measuring mass balance using satellite images. The PTAA (precipitation-temperature-area-altitude) model requires only daily observations of precipitation and temperature collected at usually low-altitude weather stations, and the area-altitude distribution of the glacier. Output are daily snow accumulation (Bc) and ablation (Ba) for each altitude interval, which is converted to mass balance by Bn = Bc – Ba. Snow Accumulation (Bc) is calculated for each area-altitude interval based on observed precipitation at one or more lower altitude weather stations located in the same region as the glacier and three coefficients that convert precipitation to snow accumulation. It is necessary to use established weather stations that have a long unbroken records so that annual means and other statistics can be determined. Ablation (Ba) is determined from temperature observed at weather stations near the glacier. Daily maximum and minimum temperatures are converted to glacier ablation using twelve coefficients.

The fifteen independent coefficients that are used to convert observed temperature and precipitation to ablation and snow accumulation apply a simplex optimizing procedure. The simplex automatically and simultaneously calculates values for each coefficient using Monte Carlo principals that rely on random sampling to obtain numerical results. Similarly, the PTAA model makes repeated calculations of mass balance, minutely re-adjusting the balance for each iteration.

The PTAA model has been tested for eight glaciers in Alaska, Washington, Austria and Nepal. Calculated annual balances are compared with measured balances for approximately 60 years for each of five glaciers. The Wolverine and Gulkana in Alaska, Hintereisferner, Kesselwandferner and Vernagtferner in Austria. It has also been applied to the Langtang Glacier in Nepal. Results for these tests are shown on the GMB (glacier mass balance) website at ptaagmb.com. Linear regressions of model versus manual balance measurements are based on a split-sample approach so that the calculated mass balances are independent of the temperature and precipitation used to calculate the mass balance.

Regression of model versus measured annual balances yield R^{2} values of 0.50 to 0.60. Application of the model to Bering Glacier in Alaska demonstrated a close agreement with ice volume loss for the 1972–2003 period measured with the geodetic method. Determining the mass balance and runoff of the partially debris-covered Langtang Glacier in Nepal demonstrates an application of this model to a glacier in the Himalayan Range.

Correlation between ablation of glaciers in the Wrangell Range in Alaska and global temperatures observed at 7000 weather stations in the Northern Hemisphere indicates that glaciers are more sensitive to the global climate than are individual temperature stations, which do not show similar correlations.

Validation of the model to demonstrate the response of glaciers in Northwestern United States to future climate change is shown in a hierarchical modeling approach. Climate downscaling to estimate glacier mass using the PTAA model is applied to determine the balance of the Bering and Hubbard Glaciers and is also validated for the Gulkana, a USGS benchmark glacier.

== See also ==
- Climate change
- Glacier retreat (disambiguation)

== Sources ==
- Benn, Douglas I.; Evans, David J.A. (2010). Glaciers & Glaciation (2nd ed.). Abingdon, UK: Hodder. ISBN 978-0-340-905791.
- Cogley, J.G.; Arendt, A.A.; Bauder, A.; Braithwaite, R.J.; Hock, R.; Jansson, P.; Kaser, G.; Möller, M.; Nicolson, L.; Rasmussen, L.A.S.; Zemp, M. (2010). Glossary of Glacier Mass Balance and Related Terms (PDF) (Report). Paris: UNESCO-IHP.
- Cuffey, K.M.; Paterson, W.S.B. (2010). The Physics of Glaciers (4th ed.). Burlington, Massachusetts: Elsevier. ISBN 978-0-12-369461-4.
- Knight, Peter G. (1999). Glaciers. Cheltenham, UK: Stanley Thornes. ISBN 978-0-7487-4000-0.
- Paterson, W.S.B. (1981). The Physics of Glaciers (2nd ed.). Oxford: Pergamon Press. ISBN 978-0-08-024004-6.
