= Glaciology =

Scientific study of ice and natural phenomena involving ice

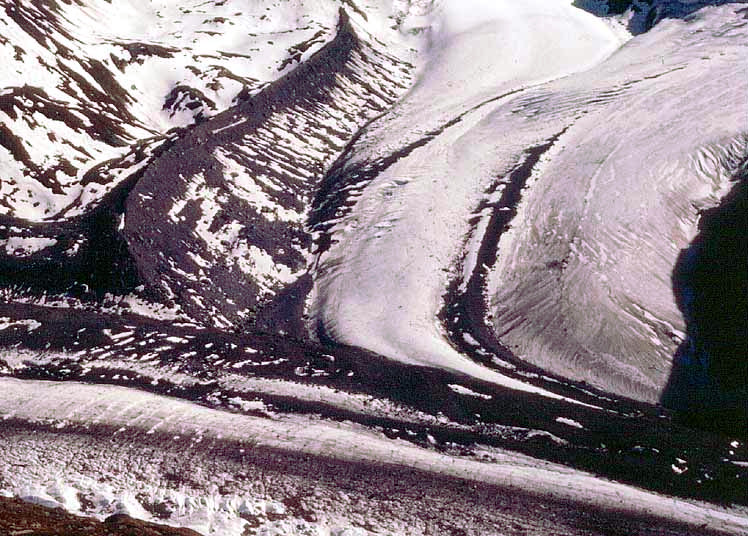
Lateral moraine on a glacier joining the Gorner Glacier, Zermatt, Swiss Alps. The moraine is the high bank of debris in the top left hand quarter of the image.

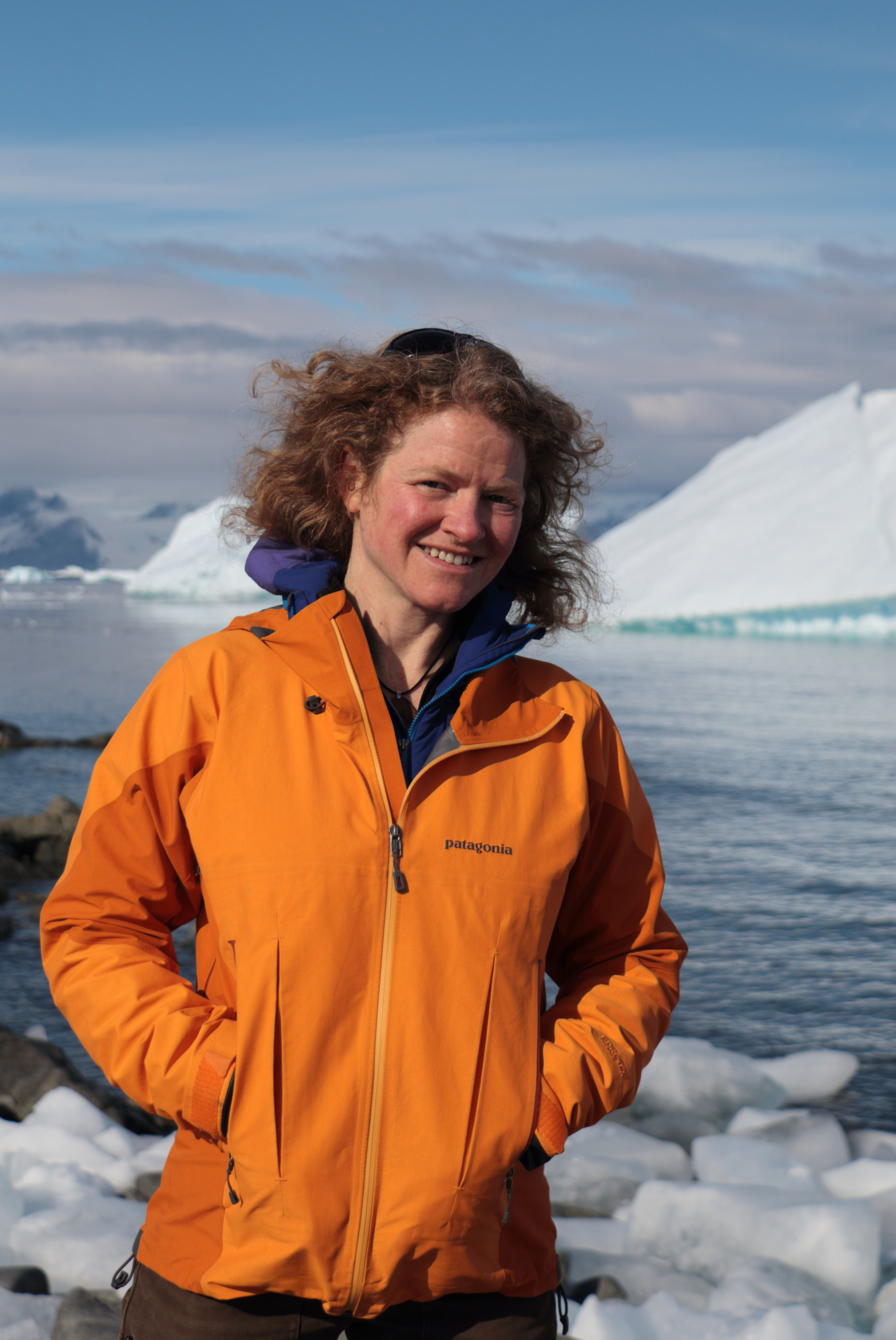
Glaciologist Erin Pettit in Antarctica, 2016

Glaciology (from Latin glacies 'frost, ice' and Ancient Greek λόγος (logos) 'subject matter'; lit. 'study of ice') is the scientific study of glaciers, or, more generally, ice and natural phenomena that involve ice.

Glaciology is an interdisciplinary Earth science that integrates geophysics, geology, physical geography, geomorphology, climatology, meteorology, hydrology, biology, and ecology. The impact of glaciers on people includes the fields of human geography and anthropology. The discoveries of water ice on the Moon, Mars, Europa and Pluto add an extraterrestrial component to the field, which is referred to as "astroglaciology".

== Overview ==
A glacier is a persistent body of dense ice (a form of rock) formed from snow falling and accumulating over a long period of time; glaciers move very slowly, either descending from high mountains, as in valley glaciers, or moving outward from centers of accumulation, as in continental glaciers.

Areas of study within glaciology include glacial history and the reconstruction of past glaciation. A glaciologist is a person who studies glaciers. A glacial geologist studies glacial deposits and glacial erosive features on the landscape. Glaciology and glacial geology are key areas of polar research.

== Types ==
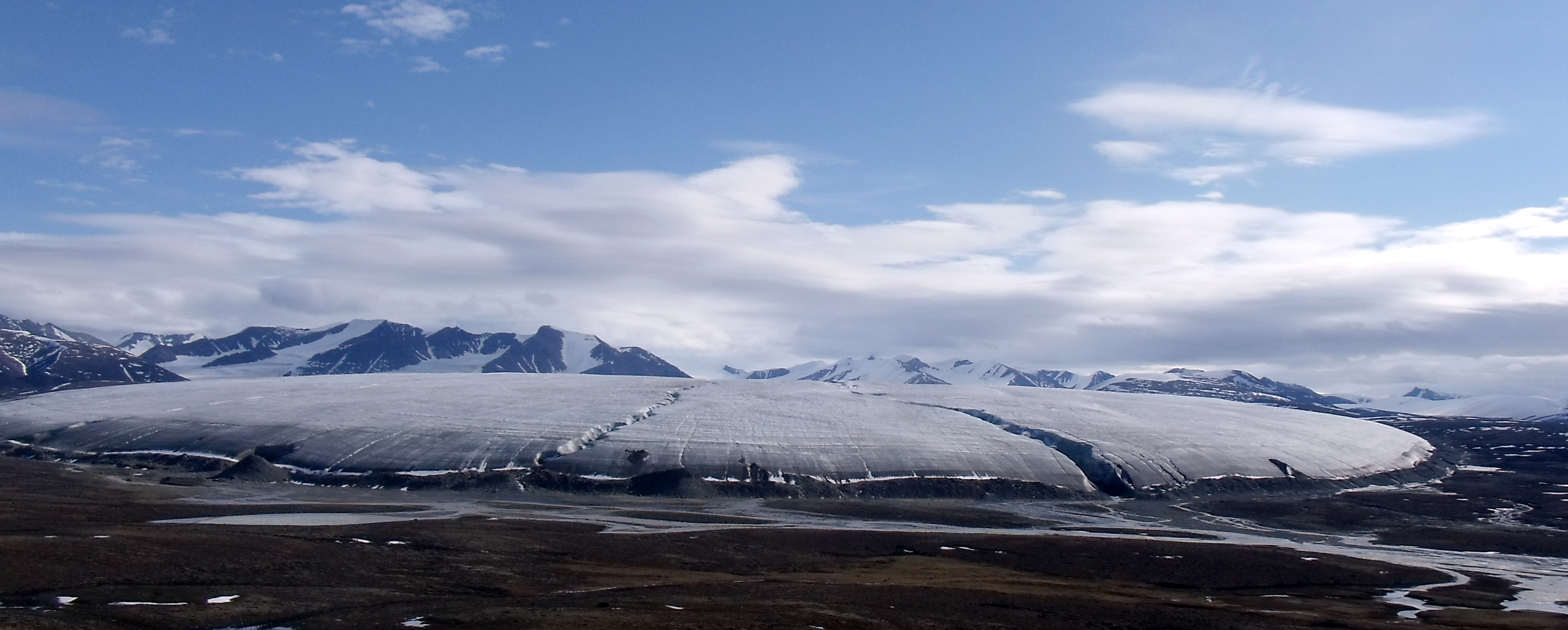
A Bylot Island glacier, Sirmilik National Park, Nunavut. This mountain glacier is one of many coming down from the interior ice cap on top of the Byam Martin Mountains.

Glaciers can be identified by their geometry and their relationship to the surrounding topography. There are two general categories of glaciation which glaciologists distinguish: alpine glaciation, accumulations or "rivers of ice" confined to valleys; and continental glaciation, unrestricted accumulations which once covered much of the northern continents.

- Alpine – ice flows down the valleys of mountainous areas and forms a tongue of ice moving towards the plains below. Alpine glaciers tend to make topography more rugged by adding and improving the scale of existing features. Various features include large ravines called cirques and arêtes, which are ridges where the rims of two cirques meet.
- Continental – an ice sheet found today, only in high latitudes (Greenland/Antarctica), thousands of square kilometers in area and thousands of meters thick. These tend to smooth out the landscapes.

== Zones of glaciers ==
- Accumulation zone – where the formation of ice is faster than its removal.
- Ablation (or wastage) zone – when the sum of melting, calving, and evaporation (sublimation) is greater than the amount of snow added each year.

== Glacier equilibrium line and ELA ==
The glacier equilibrium line is the line separating the glacial accumulation area above from the ablation area below. The equilibrium line altitude (ELA) and its change over the years is a key indicators of the health of a glacier. A long term monitoring of the ELA may be used as an indication of climate change.

== Movement ==
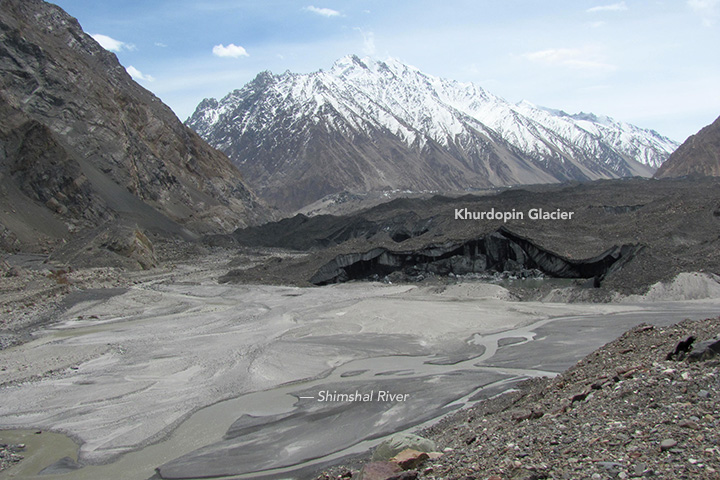
Khurdopin glacier and Shimshal River, Gilgit-Baltistan, northern Pakistan 2017. Several glaciers flow into the Shimshal Valley, and are prone to blocking the river. Khurdopin glacier surged in 2016–17, creating a sizable lake.

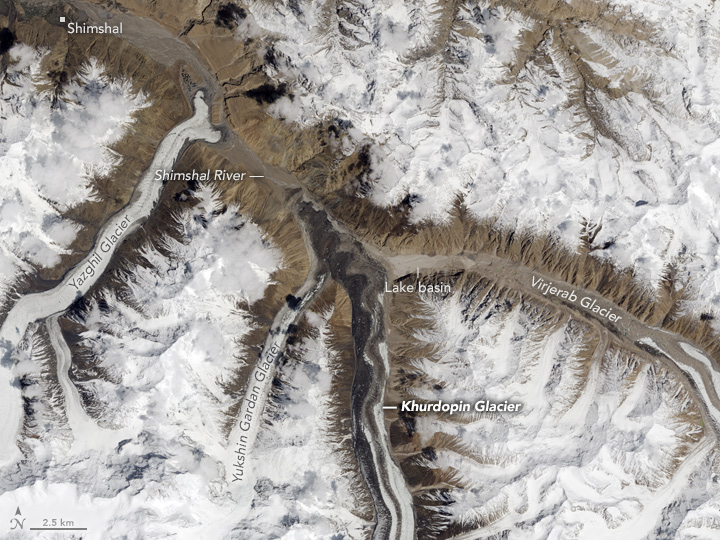
Glaciers of Shimsal Valley from space, May 13, 2017. Khurdopin glacier has dammed the Shimshal River, forming a glacial lake. The river has started to carve a path through the toe of the glacier. By early August 2017, the lake had completely drained.

When a glacier is experiencing an accumulation input by precipitation (snow or refreezing rain) that exceeds the output by ablation, the glacier shows a positive glacier mass balance and will advance. Conversely, if the loss of volume (from evaporation, sublimation, melting, and calving) exceeds the accumulation, the glacier shows a negative glacier mass balance and the glacier will melt back. During times in which the volume input to the glacier by precipitation is equivalent to the ice volume lost from calving, evaporation, and melting, the glacier has a steady-state condition.

Some glaciers show periods where the glacier is advancing at an extreme rate, that is typically 100 times faster than what is considered normal, it is referred to as a surging glacier. Surge periods may occur at an interval of 10 to 15 years, e.g. on Svalbard. This is caused mainly due to a long lasting accumulation period on subpolar glaciers frozen to the ground in the accumulation area. When the stress due to the additional volume in the accumulation area increases, the pressure melting point of the ice at its base may be reached, the basal glacier ice will melt, and the glacier will surge on a film of meltwater.

=== Rate of movement ===
The movement of glaciers is usually slow. Its velocity varies from a few centimeters to a few meters per day. The rate of movement depends upon the factors listed below:

- Temperature of the ice. A polar glacier shows cold ice with temperatures well below the freezing point from its surface to its base. It is frozen to its bed. A temperate glacier is at a melting point temperature throughout the year, from its surface to its base. This allows the glacier to slide on a thin layer of meltwater. Most glaciers in alpine regions are temperate glaciers.
- Gradient of the slope.
- Thickness of the glacier
- Subglacial water dynamics

== Glacial Terminology ==
Ablation
Wastage of the glacier through sublimation, ice melting and iceberg calving.
Ablation zone
Area of a glacier in which the annual loss of ice through ablation exceeds the annual gain from precipitation.
Arête
An acute ridge of rock where two cirques meet.
Bergschrund
Crevasse formed near the head of a glacier, where the mass of ice has rotated, sheared and torn itself apart in the manner of a geological fault.
Cirque, Corrie or cwm
Bowl shaped depression excavated by the source of a glacier.
Creep
Adjustment to stress at a molecular level.
Flow
Movement (of ice) in a constant direction.
Fracture
Brittle failure (breaking of ice) under the stress raised when movement is too rapid to be accommodated by creep. It happens, for example, as the central part of a glacier moves faster than the edges.
Glacial landform
Collective name for the morphologic structures in/on/under/around a glacier.
Moraine
Accumulated debris that has been carried by a glacier and deposited at its sides (lateral moraine) or at its foot (terminal moraine).
Névé
Area at the top of a glacier (often a cirque) where snow accumulates and feeds the glacier.
Nunatak/Rognon/Glacial Island
Visible peak of a mountain otherwise covered by a glacier.
Horn
Spire of rock, also known as a pyramidal peak, formed by the headward erosion of three or more cirques around a single mountain. It is an extreme case of an arête.
Plucking/Quarrying
Where the adhesion of the ice to the rock is stronger than the cohesion of the rock, part of the rock leaves with the flowing ice.
Tarn
A post-glacial lake in a cirque.
Tunnel valley
The tunnel that is formed by hydraulic erosion of ice and rock below an ice sheet margin. The tunnel valley is what remains of it in the underlying rock when the ice sheet has melted.

== Glacial deposits ==
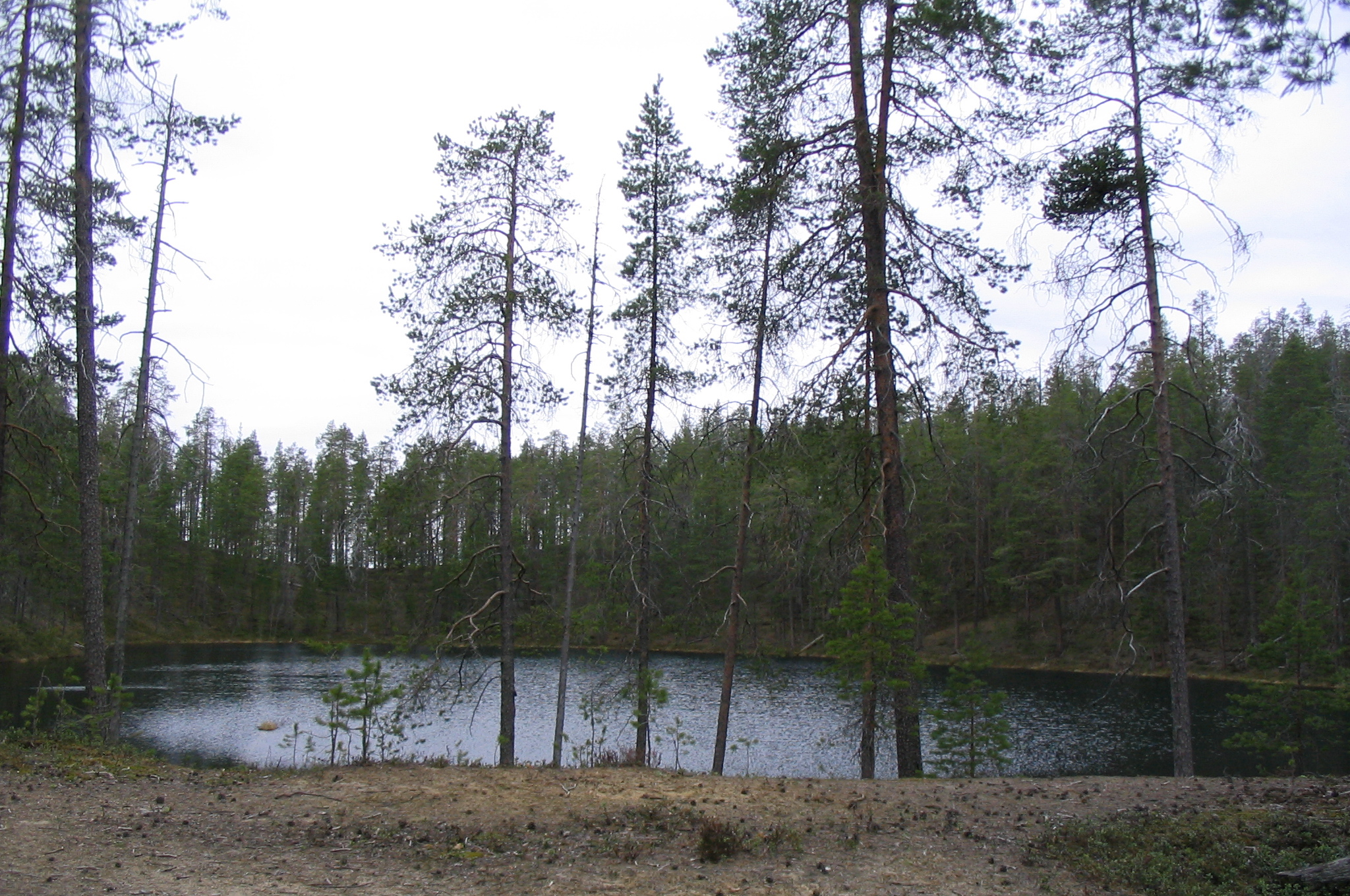
A kettle pond in Hossa, Suomussalmi municipality, Finland

=== Stratified ===
Outwash sand/gravel
From front of glaciers, found on a plain.
Kettles
When a lock of stagnant ice leaves a depression or pit.
Eskers
Steep sided ridges of gravel/sand, possibly caused by streams running under stagnant ice.
Kames
Stratified drift builds up low, steep hills.
Varves
Alternating thin sedimentary beds (coarse and fine) of a proglacial lake. Summer conditions deposit more and coarser material and those of the winter, less and finer.

=== Unstratified ===
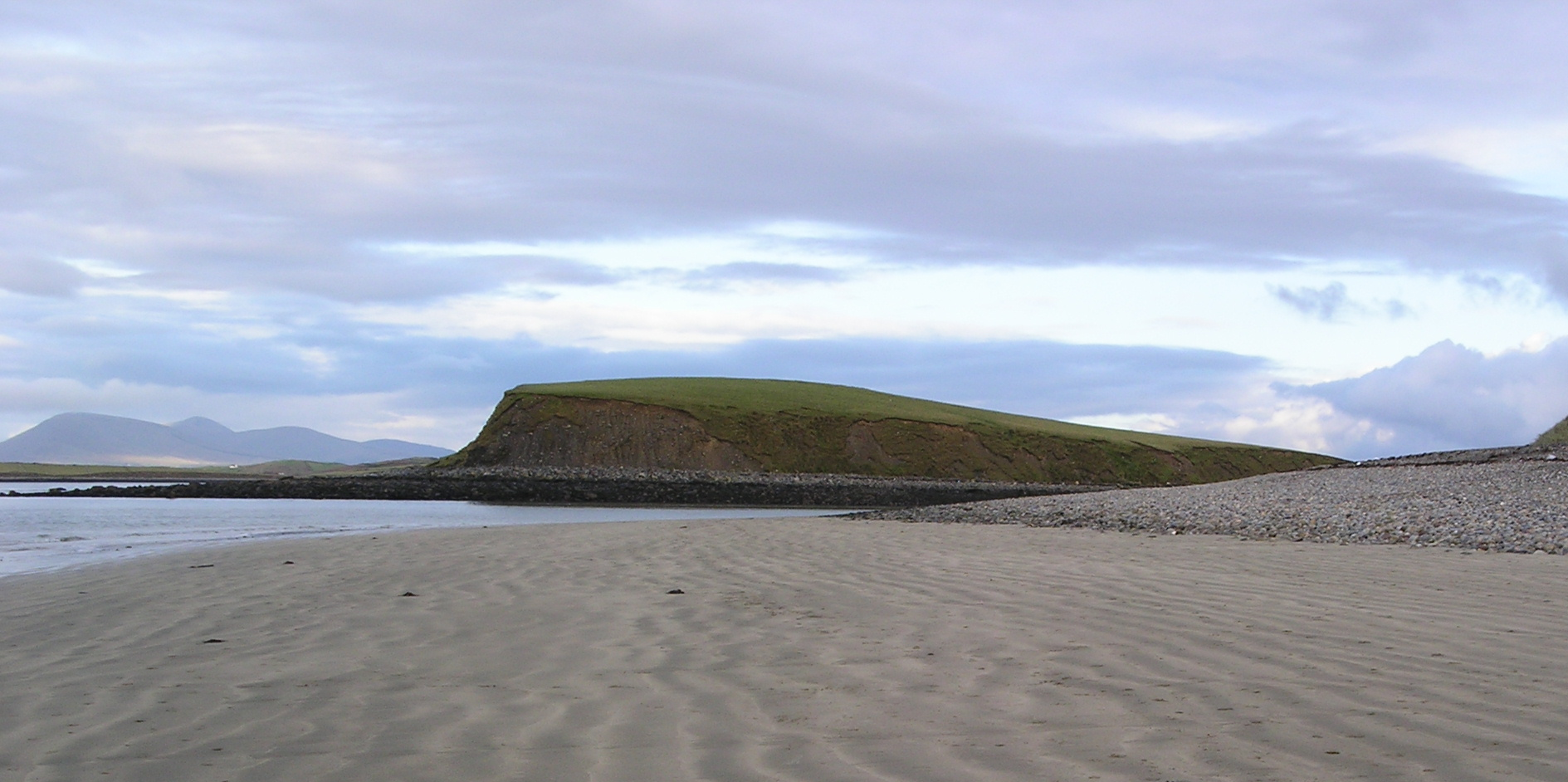
Drowned drumlin in Clew Bay, Ireland

Till-unsorted
(Glacial flour to boulders) deposited by receding/advancing glaciers, forming moraines, and drumlins.
Moraines
(Terminal) material deposited at the end; (ground) material deposited as glacier melts; (lateral) material deposited along the sides.
Drumlins
Smooth elongated hills composed of till.
Ribbed moraines
Large subglacial elongated hills transverse to former ice flow.

== See also ==
- Continental Glaciation
- Ice cap
- International Glaciological Society
- International Association of Cryospheric Sciences
- Irish Sea Glacier
- List of glaciers
- Cryosphere
