= Glacier retreat (disambiguation) =

Glacier retreat primarily refers to the retreat of glaciers since 1850.

It may also refer to:

- Glacial retreat, a type of glacial motion
- Deglaciation, the widespread retreat of glaciers at the end of an ice age
- Holocene glacial retreat, a period of deglaciation occurring between 20,000 and 10,000 years ago
