= Ablation zone =

Low-altitude area of a glacier

The ablation zone is found at the lowest altitude of the glacier, where ablation of material is lesser than accumulation.

Ablation zone or ablation area refers to the low-altitude area of a glacier or ice sheet below firn where ablation exceeds accumulation, resulting in a net loss of ice mass. Ablation zones are typically found at lower elevations, where warmer temperatures promote melting, and the equilibrium line altitude (ELA) or snow line separates the ablation zone from the higher-altitude accumulation zone. The balance between mass gained in the accumulation zone and mass lost in the ablation zone determines the glacier's mass balance. The primary method of ablation varies by glacier type: surface melting often dominates land-terminating or temperate glaciers, while calving can dominate marine-terminating glaciers. Surface debris also influences ablation rate, as thin debris increases surface melting, while thick debris insulates the underlying ice. Ablation zones are sensitive to climate change, as rising temperatures prompt upwards ELA shift, growing the ablation zone, contributing to glacial retreat and sea level rise.

== Ablation processes ==
The primary glacier mass removal processes are melting, ice calving, evaporation, sublimation, aeolian processes like blowing snow, avalanche, and any other ablation. Their relative importance depends on the glacier type and environment. Surface melt typically dominates land-terminating glaciers, because air temperatures generally increase at lower altitudes. On marine-terminating glaciers, calving can be a major, if not dominant, source of loss. In ice sheets, ablation is often a combination of surface melting, evaporation, wind erosion, and if marine-terminating, calving and under-surface ice shelf melting by seawater.

== Surface features ==
Ablation zones often contain meltwater features such as supraglacial lakes, englacial streams, and subglacial lakes. Meltwater can flow across the surface of the glacier as a supraglacial stream, or it can drain into the glacier's bed through crevasses and moulins, eventually exiting at the glacier terminus as meltwater.

== Effect of debris cover ==
Rock, dirt, or other sediment often covers part or all of a glacier's ablation zone, where it affects the rate of ice melt. Field measurements have shown a strong relationship between debris layer thickness and the melt rate; where cover is thin, melting increases versus clean ice, while thick cover serves to insulate the ice and decrease melting. The critical debris thickness is approximately 2 cm. Beyond this value, melt rate decreases exponentially with increasing debris.

Two competing mechanisms affect surface debris influence. Debris has a lower albedo than snow or clean ice, meaning it absorbs more solar radiation, accelerating melt. As debris thickens, it acts as insulation between the atmosphere and the glacier's surface, reducing the thermal energy that reaches the ice.

== Landforms and identification ==
Sediments deposited in the ablation zone forming small mounds or hillocks are called kames. Kame and kettle hole topography is useful in identifying former ablation zones of a glacier. The seasonally melting glacier deposits much sediment at its fringes in the ablation area.

The ablation zone is often visually distinguished from the accumulation zone, as seasonally melting snow reveals the underlying duller, grey-blue, bare glacier ice, often with debris. Meanwhile, the accumulation zone may appear bright white from fresh or perennial snow.

== Climate change ==
Ablation zones are sensitive to changing climate, as increasing temperatures may cause the ELA to rise, expanding the ablation zone relative to the accumulation zone. From 1901 to 2018, glacial ablation accounted for approximately 41 percent of the observed global mean sea level rise, making it the single largest contributor during that period.

== See also ==
- Rock glacier
- Retreat of glaciers since 1850
