= Capture of Ayaviri =

- Part of the Rebellion of Túpac Amaru II
Date	December 6, 1780
Location	Ayaviri, Viceroyalty of Peru
Result	Rebel victory

Belligerents
Spanish colonial forces	Aymara-Quechua rebels

Commanders and leaders
Pedro de la Vallina	Túpac Amaru II

Strength
1,700	10,000

The Capture of Ayaviri took place on December 6, 1780, in the town of Ayaviri. Rebel troops led by Túpac Amaru II took control of the town with little Spanish resistance. The capture was part of Túpac Amaru II's plan to expand in the Lake Titicaca and possibly unite with the rebels in Charcas.

== Background ==
After the victory at the Battle of Sangarará, Túpac Amaru II expanded his forces at the rebel camp of Tungasuca. After preparing his army, he planned to divert to the southern region and gain support and resources while Spanish forces were unprepared. His wife, Micaela Bastidas, administered the region surrounding Tungasuca, while Diego Cristóbal and other leaders expanded north. Túpac Amaru II wrote proclamations to the indigenous communities as he traveled south and gained support, defeating small corregidor-led militias.

== Arrival ==
The main rebel army arrived in Ayaviri on December 6. Priests from the town and the surrounding region greeted the leader upon arrival. Despite militias being formed in the region, the rebel forces received little to no Spanish resistance when capturing the town. Pedro de la Vallina, colonel of the regiment of the region, noted the faults in response to the rebel activity from Cusco. In response, the war council of the city criticized deserters and corregidores who had retreated from the rebels. In Ayaviri, Túpac Amaru II gave speeches to the town and his army, gaining more support. He also wrote more letters to other kurakas to join him. Rebels meanwhile looted haciendas and other important buildings. After a few days, Túpac Amaru II left for Pucará.

== Aftermath ==
Ayaviri was controlled by rebels for most of the war. Túpac Amaru II expanded throughout the south, arriving in Lampa on December 9. While in Lampa, he considered attacking on Puno or Arequipa, and it was most likely he was going to combine Túpac Katari's rebels across Lake Titicaca. However, Micaela Bastidas urged him to return to Tinta with approaching reinforcements from Lima. Túpac Amaru II left Juan Cavapaza in charge of the region. Pedro Vilcapaza and Diego Cristóbal, who became some of the rebellions key leaders during the second phase, led numerous key victories in the southern region and vastly controlled the area.

After the execution of Túpac Amaru II and other important leaders on May 18, 1781, the Viceroyalty displayed a leg of his son, Hipólito Túpac Amaru, in the main square of Ayaviri.
