= Andrés Túpac Amaru =

- Born: 1763; La Paz, Viceroyalty of Peru
- Died: 1786 (aged 22–23) Peniche, Portugal
- Cause of death: Shipwreck
- Allegiance: Inca Empire
- Rank: Commander
- Conflicts: Rebellion of Túpac Amaru II: Battle of Sangarará; Siege of Cusco; Siege of Sorata; Second Siege of Sorata
- Spouse: Gregoria Apaza ()

Andrés Mendigure Túpac Amaru (June 1763 – 2 February 1786) was a mestizo and rebel commander of the Rebellion of Túpac Amaru II, nephew of Túpac Amaru II. He became one of the most prominent leaders, alongside Diego Cristóbal, Mariano Túpac Amaru, and Túpac Katari during the second phase of the rebellion. He successfully led Siege of Sorata with Pedro Vilcapaza.

== Early life ==
Andrés Mendigure was born in 1763 in La Paz. His father was Pedro Mendigure, who was the cousin of Micaela Bastidas and would later become a rebel leader, and his mother was Cecilia Escalera Castro, cousin of Túpac Amaru II.

Linked to commercial activities and muleteering, he soon became associated with the indigenous groups of the Altiplano.

== Rebellion ==
=== First phase ===
Andrés Mendigure was about seventeen years old at the time of the rebellion, later assuming the name Andrés Túpac Amaru. He gained military experience at the Battle of Sangarará and then participated in the Siege of Cusco. After the defeat in the Siege of Cuzco he diverted from Tinta on February 6, 1781, to march to the Altiplano.

Andrés, along with Diego Cristóbal and Mariano Túpac Amaru, separated from Túpac Amaru II and Micaela Bastidas shortly before their capture, and immediately assumed their leadership due to family ties that reinforced their position among the rebels. Miguel Bastidas, Micaela's brother, also accompanied them.

Diego Cristóbal, Mariano, and Andrés mobilized quickly and, in an attempt to free the rebel leaders and their families, led an attack on the town of Layo, which proved unsuccessful. However, on April 18, days later, Andrés and Diego Cristóbal headed towards a royalist division in the town of Langui, where Túpac Amaru was captured. Marshal Del Valle reported that the murder of all "whites and mestizos of any age or sex" was ordered, as well as the punishment and persecution of the priests and clergy in those territories.

=== Second phase ===
Established as a rebel strategy, the insurgent leadership aimed to continue the uprising in the southern provinces of Cusco and the Altiplano, setting their sights on capturing Sorata, Puno, and La Paz. Columns from Cusco and Azángaro, under the command of veteran military leaders Pedro Vilcapaza, Miguel Bastidas, and Andrés Túpac Amaru, marched on Sorata .

On May 4, 1781, Andrés began the Siege of Sorata at the head of 20,000 soldiers. To overcome the city's resistance, Andrés Túpac Amaru used the strategy of diverting three rivers and building a dam to direct their waters against the royalist defenses. On August 5, the dam was opened, and the flood broke through the town's barricades and neutralized its defenses.

Romantically linked to Gregoria Apaza, sister of Túpac Katari, Andrés came to the aid of the Aymara leader in the Siege of La Paz after the capture of Sorata. In early October, he attempted to repeat Sorata's strategy by damming the Choqueyapu River to flood the city. However, the plan failed because a retaining wall broke before the water could be diverted. With the arrival of 10,000 royalist reinforcements in La Paz, Andrés Túpac Amaru withdrew to Azángaro.

With the signing of the amnesty pact on 26 January 1782, between Diego Cristóbal and the royalists, thousands of indigenous people reached Sicuani to confirm their acceptance of the peace. Andrés arrived in Sicuani on 1 March to personally present himself to Del Valle and accept the ceasefire.

== Pardon and death ==
Following the pardon granted by the Viceroy of Peru, Agustín de Jáuregui, and the signing of the Peace of Sicuani, Andrés and the other leaders returned to their regular lives. However, he was embroiled in new accusations, orchestrated by disaffected Spaniards and Creoles who opposed the pardon.

In March 1783, Andrés and his entire family were arrested, and his uncle, Diego Cristóbal, was executed. The rest of the family was sentenced to ten years in prison and perpetual exile from the Viceroyalty, as he and the other leaders sought the independence of the Viceroyalty of Peru against Spanish interests in the Americas.

He was put aboard the Spanish ship, San Pedro de Alcantara, along with his cousin, Fernando Túpac Amaru, and other prisoners. Having sailed from Callao for the second time on December 16, 1784, the ship suffered numerous floods until, on February 2, 1786, it finally ran aground near Peniche, Portugal. Andrés and 17 other prisoners did not survive; only 6 were saved, including his cousin and Túpac Amaru II's youngest son, Fernando.
