= Battle of Saylla =

- Part of the Rebellion of Túpac Amaru II
Date	3 January, 1781
Location	Saylla, Viceroyalty of Peru
Result	Royalist victory

Belligerents
Spanish Empire	Aymara-Quechua rebels

Commanders and leaders
Joaquín de Varcárcel Francisco Laisequilla	Antonio Castelo

Strength
~400	~600

Casualties and losses
Unknown	400 killed

The Battle of Saylla took place on 3 January, 1781, in the town of Saylla. After the battle, Royalist soldiers captured the flag bearing the Túpac Amaru II coat of arms.

== Background ==
Túpac Amaru II began preparing to lay siege on Cusco and ordered rebel forces to surround the city, with Diego Cristóbal aiming to cut off the cities food supply from Paucartambo. Rebel creole commander, Antonio Castelo, had orders to lead his vanguard from the south where he would be joined by Túpac Amaru II. Spanish cavalry units led by Francisco Laisequilla and Joaquín de Varcárcel were stationed south of Cusco.

== Battle ==
After hearing news from the priest of Urcos on 2 January, the royalty cavalry of Joaquín de Varcárcel marched towards Antonio Castelo's rebel forces in Saylla. The next day, they encountered Castelo's vanguard, and Varcárcel's superior cavalry regiment ambushed and defeated the rebels. An estimated 400 rebels were killed while the Spanish received minimal losses. During the battle, the Spanish were able to capture a flag that beared the coat of arms of Túpac Amaru II. With heavy losses, Antonio Castelo halted his southern flank on Cusco, waiting for Túpac Amaru II's reinforcements to prepare to siege Cusco, which began a week later.
