= Battle of Pucacasa =

- Part of the Rebellion of Túpac Amaru II
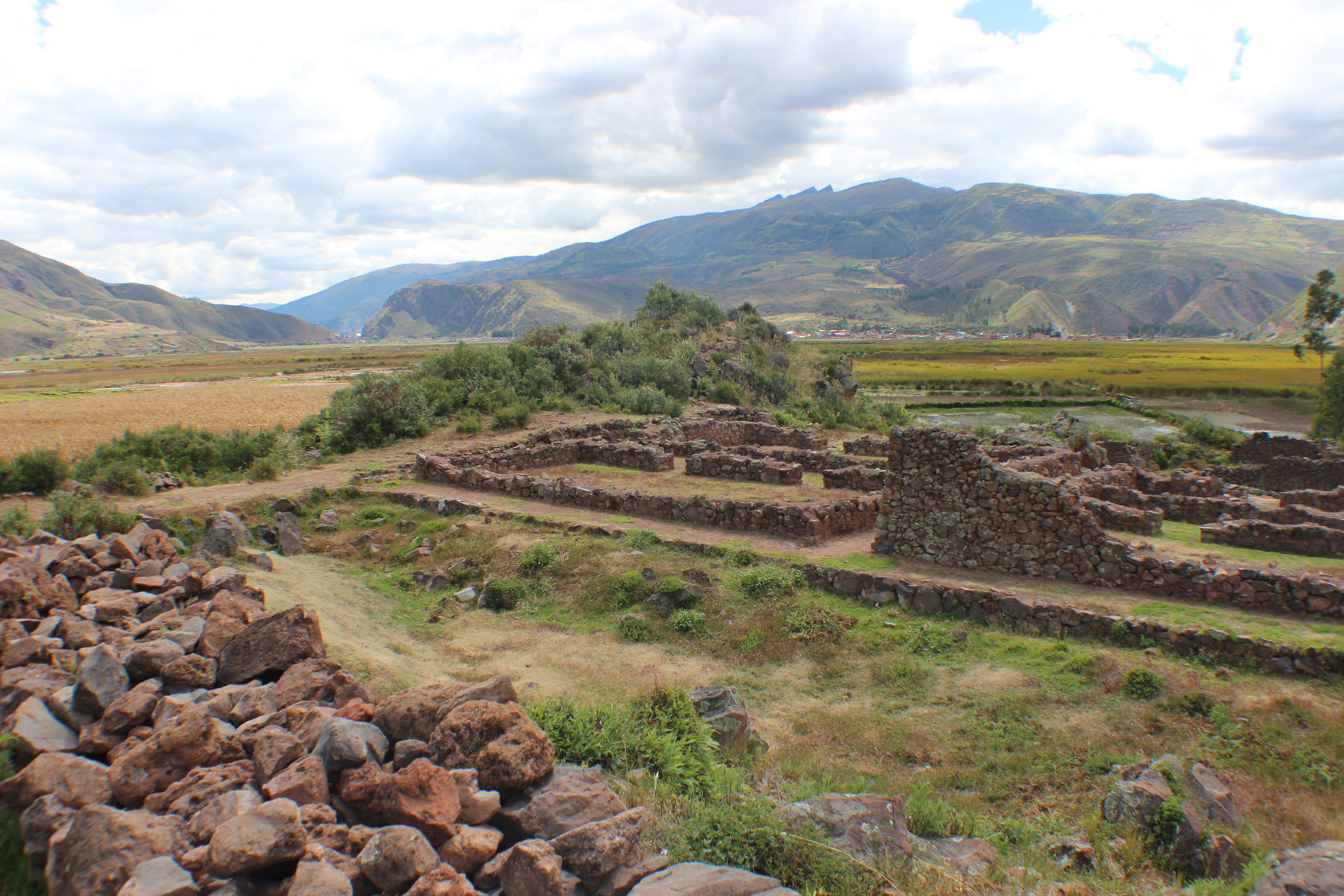
Date	Mach 22 – 23, 1781
Location	Lucre, Viceroyalty of Peru
Result	Inconclusive

Belligerents
Spanish Empire	Aymara-Quechua rebels

Commanders and leaders
José del Valle; Juan Manuel Campero	Túpac Amaru II

Strength
10,000	20,000

Casualties and losses
Unknown	Unknown

The Battle of Pucacasa took place between 22 and 23 March, 1781, in the Quispicanchi province of Cusco, between Spanish royalists led by José del Valle, and Túpac Amaru II's rebel army. It was the first major engagement between the Spanish reinforcements from Lima and Túpac Amaru's main army. Both sides suffered heavy losses, with Del Valle narrowly retreating the area.

== Background ==
Despite the failed Siege of Cusco, more provinces fell to the insurgents. The revolutionary movement reached, among others, the regions between Cusco and Arequipa, and spread throughout Upper Peru. Royalists reinforcements from Lima arrived in Cusco on 24 February 1781, with an official count of 17,116 soldiers. Commander José del Valle divided his army into six columns which planned to encircle the centralized rebel bases around Tinta. Knowing of the royalists arrival, Túpac Amaru planned to destroy Del Valle's two central columns.

== Battle ==
Túpac Amaru sent a letter to Del Valle on 18 March, warning of an attack the following day. Del Valle's put his men on high alert and marched through the frozen pass of Pucacasa by the ancient site of Pikillaqta, while advancing to Tinta. Rebel spies followed them. Del Valle's paranoia on a surprise attack might have deterred attention to rebels who had begun pursuing the royalists.

On 22 March, Túpac Amaru ordered an attack on the royalists, who were setting up to camp the night. However, while setting up their positions for the harsh weather, an escaped prisoner warned the royalists of the rebel attack. Thus, when Túpac Amaru attacked, he was met with heavy rifle fire from Del Valle. The more experience cavalry of the royalists attempted to encircle the rebels, but failed due to the harsh terrain. Del Valle's column was suffering heavy losses and his camp was almost captured until the cavalry regiment of Juan Manuel Campero arrived to halt the rebel advance. The following day, the Túpac Amaru ordered the withdrawal of the rebels at 8:00am. Del Valle withdrew as well, faced with many desertions, lack of supplies, cold, and his soldiers collapsing in the snow

== Aftermath ==
After the disaster at Pucacasa, Del Valle diverted his troops toward one of the main rebel bases at Tinta. At Urcos, the rebels cut the bridge, causing the royalists to lose several days crossing the Urubamba River. The royalists then captured Quiquijana, which had been abandoned by the rebels, finding only women and the elderly. In retaliation, the Spanish commander hanged Luis Pomainga, a distant relative of Túpac Amaru, and others he considered rebels.

The rebel forces retreated to Combapata, where trenches and barricades were built up.
