= Battle of Pillpinto =

- Part of the Rebellion of Túpac Amaru II
Date	November 26, 1780
Location	Pillpinto, Viceroyalty of Peru
Result	Rebel victory

Belligerents
Spanish Empire	Aymara-Quechua rebels

Commanders and leaders
Mateo Pumacahua	Tomasa Tito Condemayta

Strength
~60 royalist militia	~80 rebels

Casualties and losses
2–10	0–3

The Battle of Pillpinto was a small engagement of the Rebellion of Túpac Amaru II in Pillpinto, Viceroyalty of Peru. The battle took place on 26 November 1780, with a small women's brigade led by Tomasa Tito Condemayta successfully suppressing the Spanish militia from capturing Túpac Amaru II.

== Background ==
After the rebel victory at the Battle of Sangarará, the rebels led by Túpac Amaru II dispersed around the Cuzco region, capturing small towns and recruiting soldiers. The city of Cusco announced a state of emergency, calling for royalist militiamen to mobilize and repress the growing rebellion. Tomasa Tito Condemayta led a brigade of approximately 80 women soldiers in Acos. Marco Torre, leading the rebels in Acomayo reported a possible attempt at capture of Túpac Amaru II by royalist militia in the regions south of Acomayo.

== Battle ==
The battle took place in the bridge of Pillpinto on 26 November 1780. A small group of royalist militia, speculated to be led by Mateo Pumacahua, had orders to gain intelligence on the whereabouts of Túpac Amaru II and his main force. Upon crossing the bridge, the royalists were attacked by Tomasa Tito Condemayta's force, who were documented to only be armed with slings, clubs, and a few number of muskets. Attacking from higher ground and taking the militia by surprise, the rebels were able to successfully defeat the royalists, deterring them from the larger forces of Túpac Amaru II and Micaela Bastidas.

== Aftermath ==
The royalist defeat at Pillpinto led to the withdrawal and weakening of Spanish forces in the southern region of Cusco, who would request support from Lima. The rebels were able to maintain their control of the region.

== See also ==
- Rebellion of Túpac Amaru II
- Battle of Sangarará
- Tomasa Tito Condemayta
