= Siege of Cusco (1781) =

- Part of the Rebellion of Túpac Amaru II
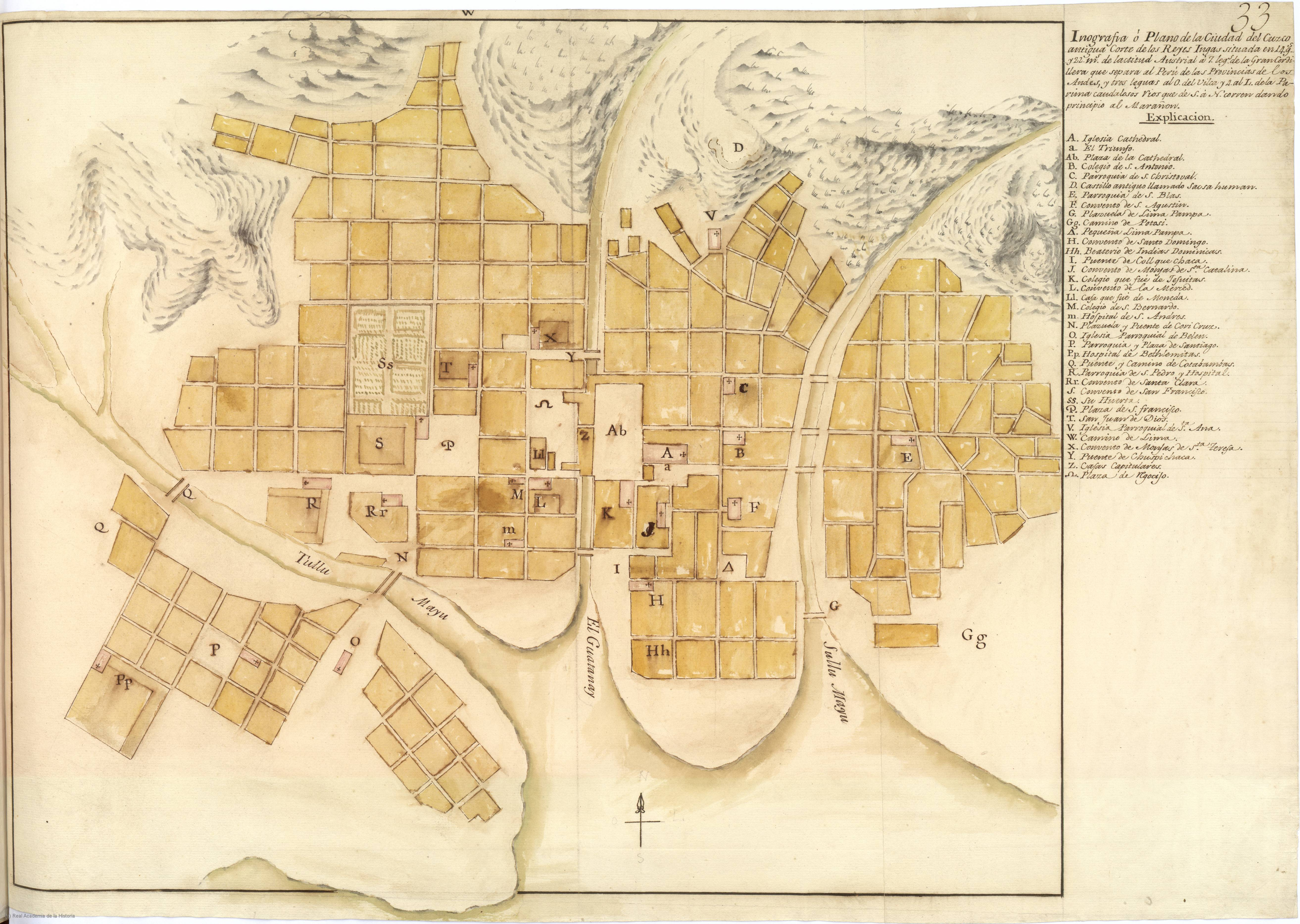
- Map of Cusco after the siege.
| Date | 4 – 11 January 1781 |
| Location | Cusco, Viceroyalty of Peru |
| Result | Royalist victory |

Belligerents
| Spanish Empire | Aymara-Quechua rebels |

Commanders and leaders
| Gabriel de Avilés; Mateo Pumacahua; Moscoso y Peralta | Túpac Amaru II; Diego Cristóbal; Antonio Castelo |

Strength
| 15,000 | 40,000 |

Casualties and losses
| 500–1,000 killed or wounded | 2,000–5,000 killed, wounded, or executed |

The Siege of Cusco, also known as the Battle of Cusco, was one of the most decisive engagements during the first phase of the Rebellion of Túpac Amaru II. Túpac Amaru II's main rebel army, despite warnings from other leaders to act earlier, sieged Cusco on 4 January, 1781. The first set of reinforcements sent from Lima led by Gabriel de Avilés arrived days earlier. Royalists were able to successfully defend the city, with Túpac Amaru ordering the retreat of the rebel army between on 11 January.

== Background ==
Micaela Bastidas urged Túpac Amaru II to attack Cusco after the Battle of Sangarará, since the city was unprepared and reinforcements from Lima would take months to respond and arrive. Túpac Amaru II however, planned to expand and increase his army by taking control of the Altiplano, as well as unite with the rebels of Túpac Katari. Despite the southern success, Bastidas sent numerous letters, calling out Amaru to return to the rebel bases of Tinta and Tungasuca, fearing an attack from Cusco. Amaru returned in December 1780 and agreed to attack Cusco in early January 1781. He mobilized his main army, with Bastidas and Tomasa Tito Condemayta leading a smaller force in Tinta incase of a royalist counter.

Bishop Moscoso and the Cusco War Council and used propaganda around the region to deter support from the rebels, ordering to withdraw from launching an offensive attack until reinforcements arrived. After hearing of the uprising on 24 November, Viceroy Agustín de Jáuregui sent Gabriel de Avilés with a force of 600 men to Cusco on 28 November, with orders to gain soldiers along the way. The reinforcements arrived in the city on 1 January, earlier than Túpac Amaru II expected. Reinforcements led by José Antonio de Areche and José del Valle left Lima on 20 December.

== Siege ==
=== Plans ===
On December 20, Túpac Amaru ordered his army to depart for the city of Cusco. His army was commanded by with and his two sons, Hipólito and Mariano, along with creole artilleryman, Antonio de Figueroa. Antonio Castelo led a smaller vanguard group through the valley with orders to recruit, attack royalist forces, plunder haciendas, and surround the city from the north. Meanwhile, Diego Cristóbal returned to the Sacred Valley with the intention of opening a second front and capture the fortress of Sacsayhuamán.

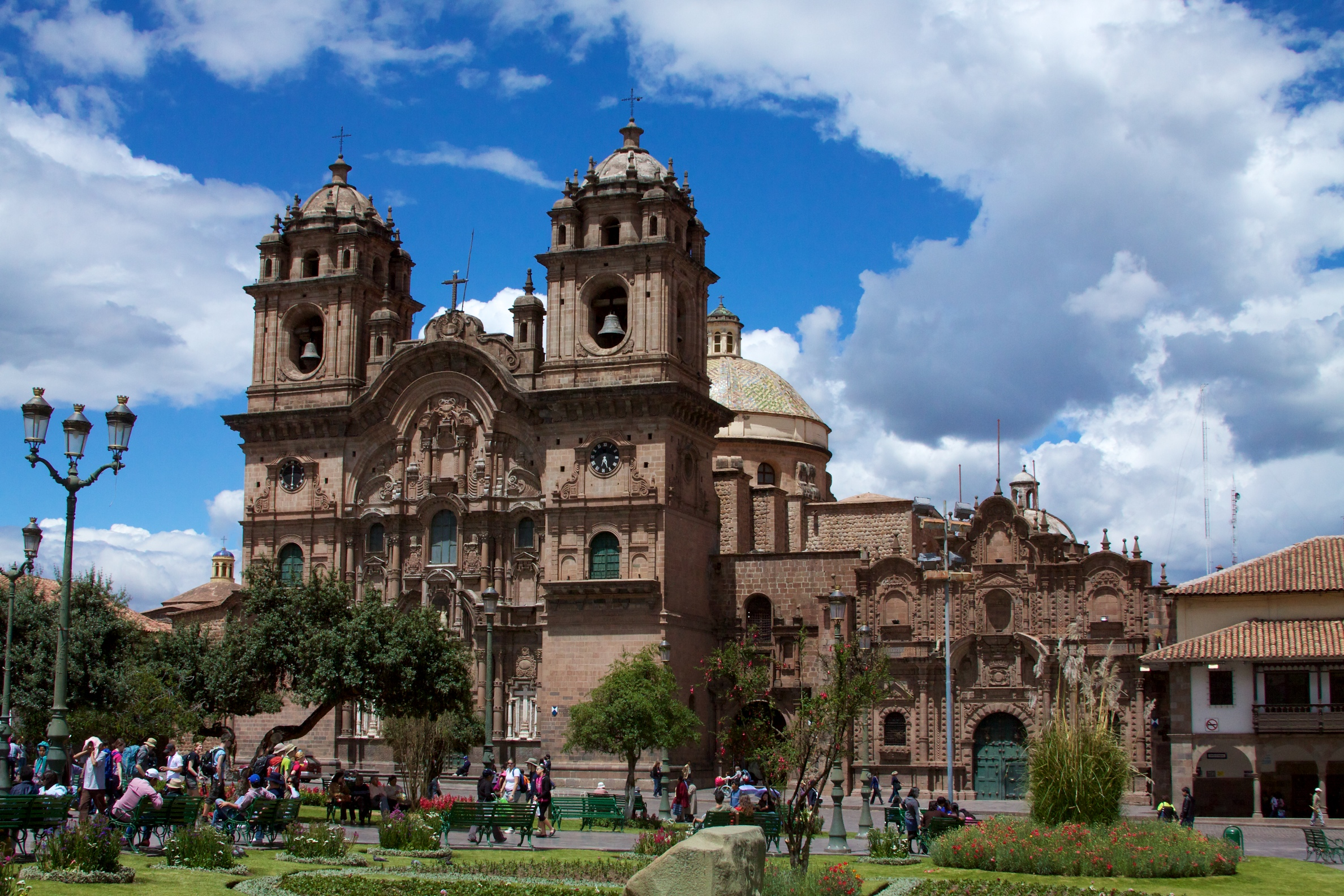
Iglesia de la Compañía de Jesús, used as royalist barracks and hospital.

On December 23, the Cusco war council learned of Túpac Amaru's plans to attack. The city was defended by a disciplined army of 3,000 men. The city barracks were set up in the Iglesia de la Compañía de Jesús. The royalists organized patrols, especially at night, and formed six militia companies, buying or requisitioning weapons and ammunition, and training clergymen and students. Bishop Moscoso spearheaded efforts to raise funds for the purchase or manufacture of weapons to equip the militias, collecting a considerable sum of 110,881 pesos between November and December. Fearing internal traitors, anyone was forbidden from leaving the city in the days leading up to the arrival of the rebel army. On December 19, Ignacio de Santiesteban Ruiz Cano wrote from the highlands southwest of Tungasuca that he needed reinforcements, as the indigenous people were simply laughing at his exhortations to remain loyal.

=== Main siege ===
Falling for a diversionary maneuver by Antonio Castelo, the royalists sent troops to, the entrance to Cusco from the Sacred Valley. Marching lightly and accustomed to the area's steep topography, Túpac Amaru and his troops avoided the enemy by taking a less direct route through the mountain peaks south of the valley. Despite their large numbers, they arrived quickly and silently and started raising their voices, shouting, singing, playing drums, setting off fireworks, and firing weapons, managing to intimidate all who saw or heard them. According to one witness, the mountain "looked like the back of a porcupine, with 40,000 rebels serving as quills."

Despite these maneuvers the rebel forces did not immediately attack Cusco because Túpac Amaru hoped the city would join his cause, sending detailed letters to Bishop Moscoso, the residents, and the city council. These letters were rejected, while, unlike what occurred in the areas near Tinta, some of the indigenous people and other locals of Cusco and its surroundings did not join the rebel side, either because their local leaders prevented them from doing so or because they did not want to. Later analysts consider Túpac Amaru's letters to provide insight into his ideas and plans. They indicate his efforts to maintain or gain the support of the mestizo and creole population, and perhaps his confidence that the city would rise up and support him. They are also a sign that the leader sought to take the city without bloodshed. Most, however, view the correspondence as a curious but significant waste of time, allowing the city authorities to prepare for the arrival of Gabriel de Avilés' troops. Since receiving news of the victorious return of Túpac Amaru from the south, Colonel Avilés accelerated his advance by means of forced marches, the troops entering Cusco on January 1, 1781.

On January 4, Túpac Amaru ordered the mobilization of his troops to surround the city, beginning the siege. Both sides clashed in bloody hand-to-hand combat, with weapons and cannons adding to the carnage. The revolutionary force attacked with bravery and tenacity, and the high command of the defenders of Cusco carried out their duties effectively, with the bishop and the mayor playing particularly noteworthy roles. Reinforced by 8,000 men commanded by the corregidor of Paruro and his loyal caciques, the forces defending the city numbered over 12,000 soldiers.

Finally, discouraged by the lack of support from the city's population and the desertions caused by the harsh conditions of the rebel camp in the hills of Cusco, and refusing to massacre the indigenous troops that the royalists placed in the vanguard, Túpac Amaru ordered the end of the siege on January 11, 1781.

== Aftermath ==
Following the rebel retreat, momentum of the rebels slowed down and royalists in Cusco celebrated. Túpac Amaru II hoped to capture Paucartambo and continue his campaign in the south. While Cusco remained defended and loyal to the Spanish, the surrounding region still largely supported the rebel cause despite deserters and propaganda. The final, larger and professional group of reinforcements of Lima arrived in Cusco on 24 February 1781, with a count of over 20,000.

Creoles and mestizos began to shift loyalty to the Spanish after the failed siege and increase anti-Spaniard sentiment among the largely Aymara and Quechua rebels. High ranking officer, Antonio de Figueroa, whom Micaela Bastidas and Túpac Amaru greatly trusted, possibly sabotaged the rebels during the siege by redirecting cannons from key points. He would later betray the rebels and join the royalists.
