= Battle of Combapata =

- Part of the Rebellion of Túpac Amaru II
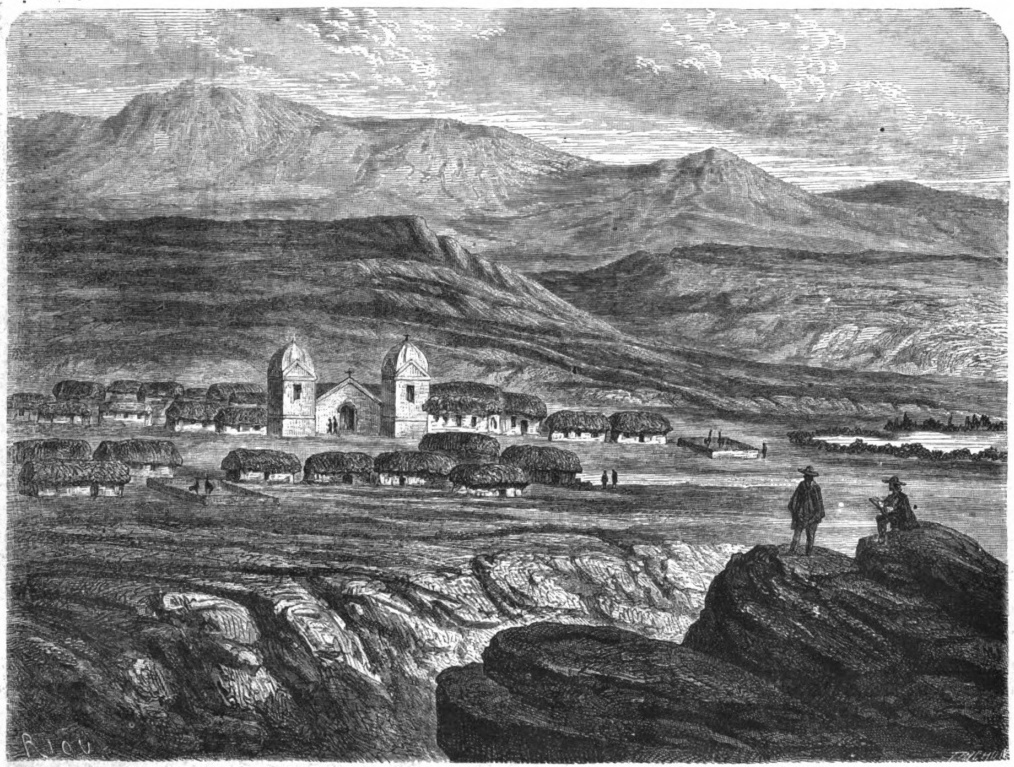
- View of Combapata in the early 19th century
Date	5 April, 1781
Location	Combapata, Viceroyalty of Peru
Result	Royalist victory

Belligerents
Spanish Empire	Aymara-Quechua rebels

Commanders and leaders
José del Valle	Túpac Amaru II

Strength
16,000	10,000

Casualties and losses
Unknown	1,000 killed and wounded

The Battle of Combapata took place on 5 April, 1781, as part of the royalist Tinta Campaign. The battle was won by the Spanish royalist forces, and led to the search for Túpac Amaru II after his retreat. The remaining rebel forces, disorganized, faced royalists a day later in Checacupe. The bulk of the Tupac Amaru army did not participate in the battle because, following the plans of Túpac Amaru II, it split up and retreated south towards the Altiplano, designated as its new headquarters after the fall of Tinta.

== Background ==
In the confrontation with the royalist troops at Pucacasa, Túpac Amaru II failed to accomplish his mission of defeating Spanish marshall José del Valle's royalist column before it received reinforcements. He therefore withdrew his army from Urcos to Combapata, heading towards his headquarters in Tinta, intending to lure them into another ambush. The royalist columns, for their part, had suffered serious losses in the battle, as well as desertions, so they awaited the remnants of their forces and marched in pursuit of their enemies.

By the end of March, royalist forces were approaching the Tupac Amaru stronghold of Combapata, located at the confluence of the Vilcanota and Combapata rivers, north of Tinta, in the hills above the valley where the Salca River flows into the Vilcanota. Thanks to deserters, the royalists knew that the rebels were suffering from a shortage of supplies.

== Battle ==
During the night of April 4, the rebel troops, led by Tupac Amaru, left their camp in search of Villalta's second column, which had arrived that same day, and attempted to surprise them by beheading four sentries; however, a fifth sentry fired his weapon and the suddenly awakened royalists rushed in battle formation against the rebel vanguard charging from the hail covered mountains, and with volleys of rifle fire they managed to force them to abandon the heights and enter the valley where a pitched battle would take place.

In open battle, on relatively open and flat terrain, and without the element of surprise, the royalists had the advantage. Using their superior cavalry and weaponry, they attacked, encircling their enemies, likely informed of their strength and exact location by an informant. The charge of the Black militia broke the rebel lines, while gunfire left "a large number of corpses, not to mention countless wounded." On the afternoon of April 5, Túpac Amaru II, fighting amidst his troops, ordered the retreat of his decimated forces, and he, for his part, managed to evade the Spanish encirclement by plunging into the Urubamba and Combapata river, even at the risk of drowning. It took the royalists hours to cross the river, as the rebels had destroyed the only bridge.

== Aftermath ==
After the battle, the Spanish entered Tinta, a city that was sacked, and where they executed several rebel prisoners, as well as local residents accused of being collaborators, and their heads were displayed for the public to see.

Túpac Amaru managed to reach the town of Langui, where the traitors Ventura Landaeta and the mestizo Francisco Santa Cruz, hoping to collect the reward offered by the royalists, tricked him into surrendering, allowing royalist troops to enter the town and capture him. Along with the leader, 40 of his commanders fell into royalist hands. Túpac Amaru was condemned to death after a month-long trial and was executed in Cusco on May 18. Many residents of Tinta were imprisoned, accused of collaboration.
