= Rebellion of Túpac Amaru II =

1780–83 uprising in Spanish-ruled Peru

- Part of the decolonization of the Americas
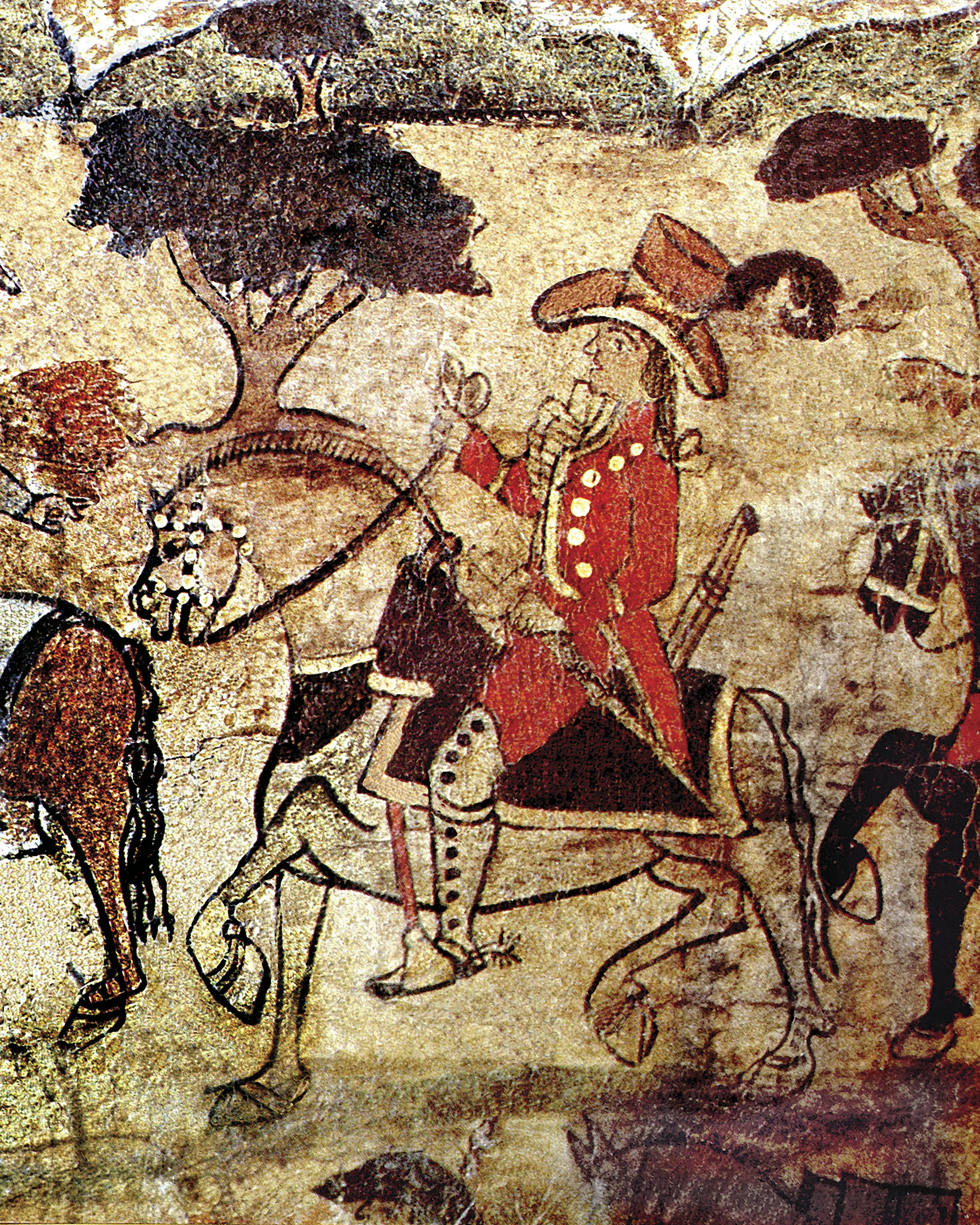
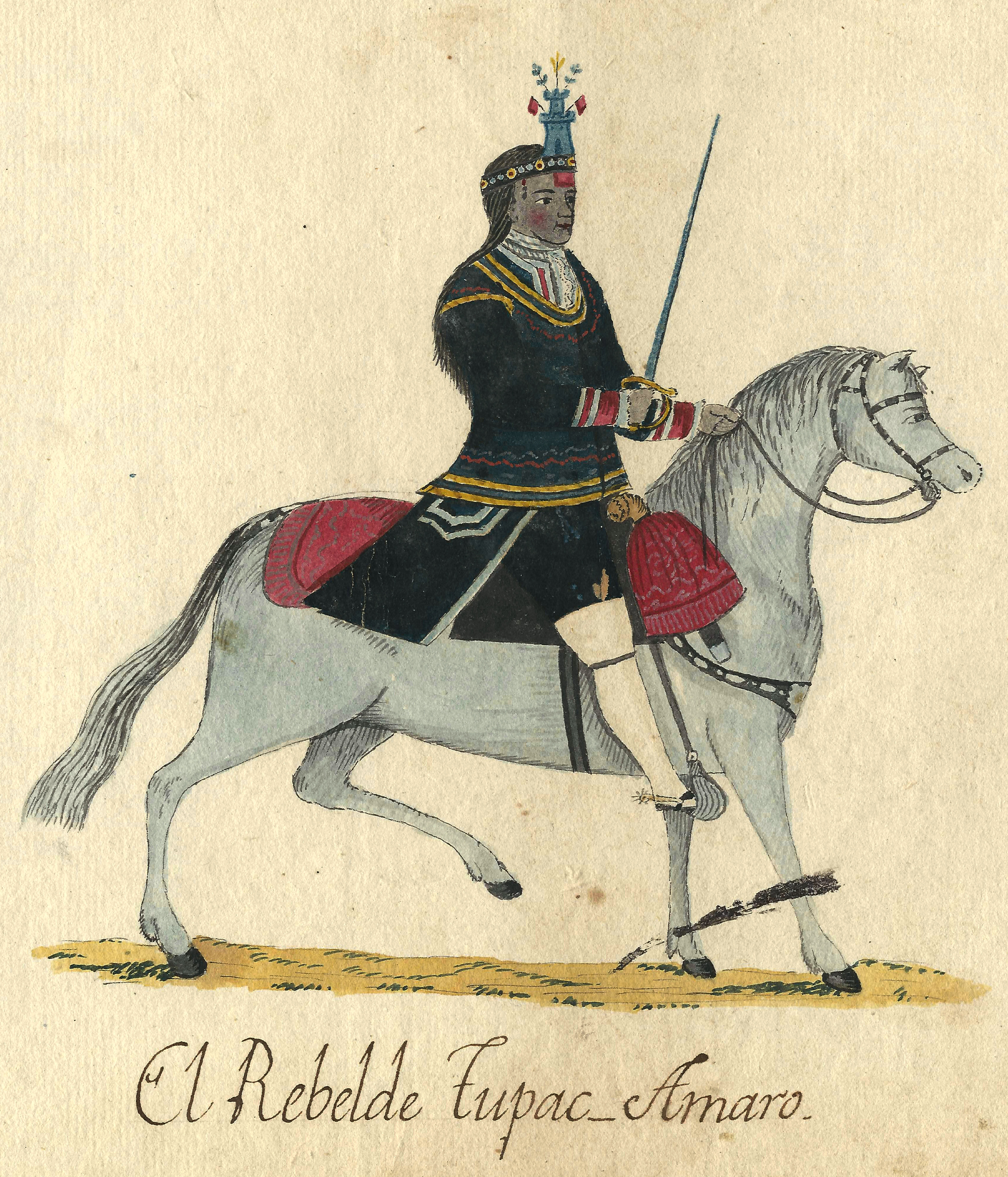
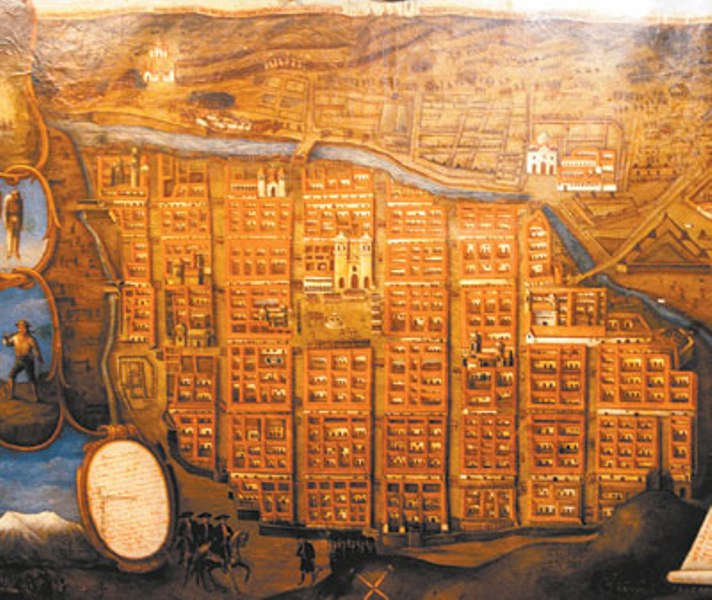
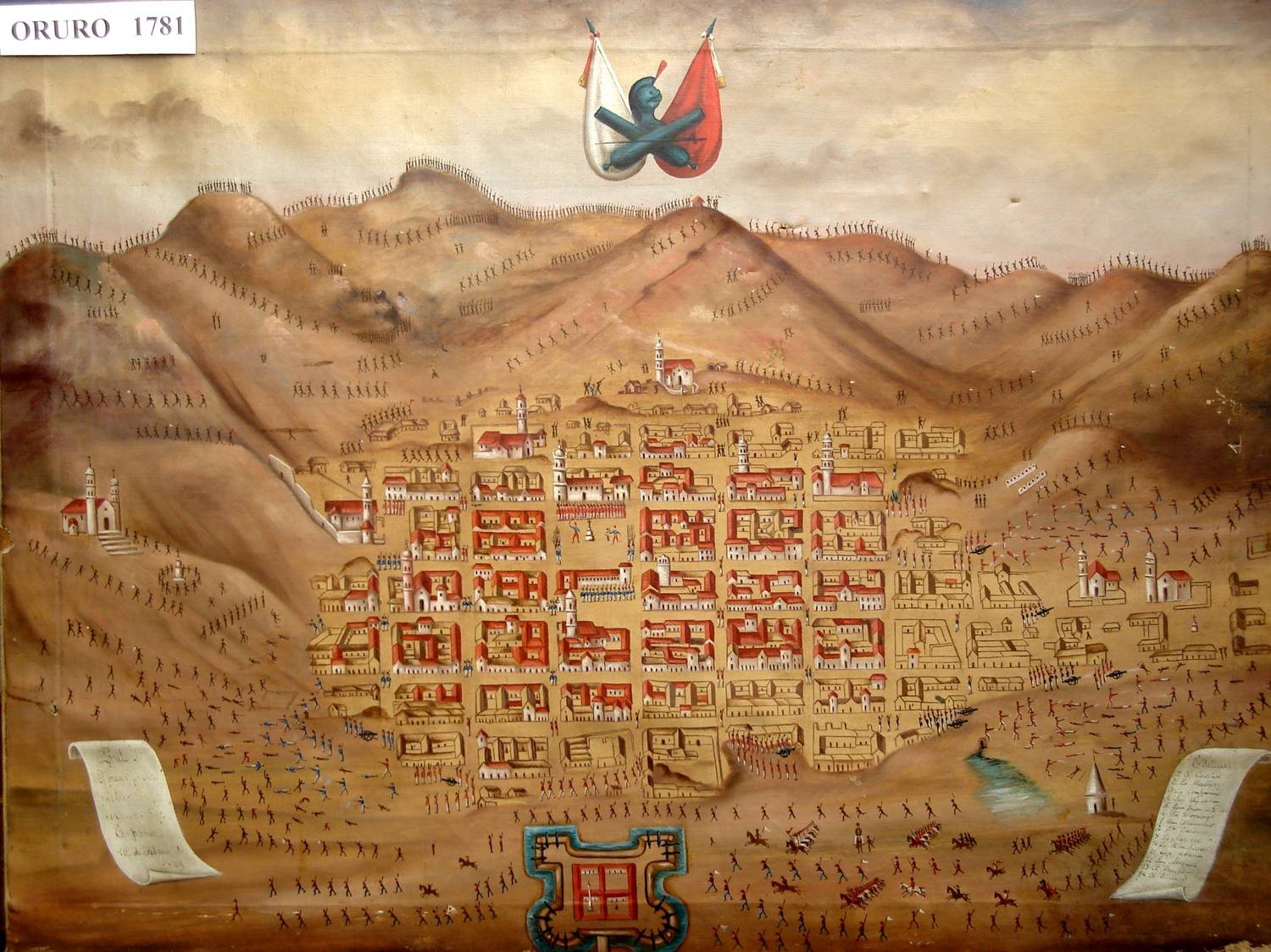
- Clockwise from top: Rebellion of Túpac Amaru II, illustration of Túpac Amaru II from c. 1784–1806, rebel assault in the Rebellion of Oruro, Siege of La Paz
| Date | 4 November 1780 – 15 March 1783 |
| Location | Viceroyalty of Peru and Real Audiencia of Charcas |
| Result | Spanish victory: Abolition of repartimiento, corregidores, and Kuraka; Aymara-Quechua cultural genocide |

Belligerents
| Spanish Empire | Aymara-Quechua rebels |

Commanders and leaders
| Agustín de Jáuregui; Antonio de Areche; José del Valle; Gabriel de Avilés; Ignacio Flores; Mateo Pumacahua; Tiburcio Landa †; Diego Cusihuamán Minga; Antonio de Arriaga (executed); Juan José de Vértiz; Fernando Vélaz de Medrano; Sebastián de Segurola; José de Roseguín | Túpac Amaru II (executed); Micaela Bastidas (executed); Tomasa Tito Condemayta (executed); Diego Cristóbal Túpac Amaru; Hipólito Túpac Amaru (executed); Antonio de Figueroa; Andrés Túpac Amaru; Pedro Vilcapaza (executed); Túpac Katari (executed); Tomás Katari (executed); Bartolina Sisa (executed); Gregoria Apaza (executed) |

Strength
| Spanish units: 20,000–30,000 soldiers | Rebel units: 100,000 soldiers 40,000 – 60,000 First Phase; 10,000 – 40,000 Second Phase |

Casualties and losses
- 100,000 total estimated killed 10,000 died of starvation or illness

The Rebellion of Túpac Amaru II was an uprising by kuraka-led Aymara, Quechua, and mestizo rebels aimed at overthrowing Spanish colonial rule in Peru, from 1780 to 1783. The causes of the rebellion included opposition to the Bourbon Reforms, an economic downturn in colonial Peru, and a grassroots revival of Inca cultural identity led by Túpac Amaru II, an indigenous kuraka and the leader of the rebellion. While Amaru II and other prominent rebel leaders were captured and executed by the Spanish in 1781, the rebellion continued for at least another year under Diego Cristóbal Túpac Amaru, Túpac Katari and Andrés Túpac Amaru, among others.

The rebellion arose as a reaction to the imposition of the Bourbon Reforms in the Spanish viceroyalties of America. These reforms, among others, forced the indigenous population to mine minerals under the Mit'a system, largely in Cerro Rico in Potosí. Among Túpac Amaru II's proclamations were the demands of the freedom of the indigenous population and the abolition of slavery.

The rebellion began with the capture and execution of Antonio de Arriaga, the corregidor of Tinta. This initial phase of the rebellion in Cusco and the south was marked by key victories, such as the capture of Ayaviri, the Battle of Pillpinto, and especially the Battle of Sangarará, which consolidated rebel control over the Cusco region. As royalist forces responded with a punitive expedition from Lima, the insurgent movement began to weaken. Túpac Amaru II was captured after being betrayed when retreating to Langui after the defeat in the Battle of Combapata on 5 April 1781, and Battle of Checacupe on 6 April. He, along with his family and other commanders, were executed in the Plaza de Armas of Cusco on 18 May 1781. Despite the death of Túpac Amaru II, Túpac Katari and Diego Cristóbal Túpac Amaru continued the rebellion until 1783.

Tupac Amaru II's rebellion was simultaneous, and occasionally cooperated, with the uprising of Túpac Katari in colonial-era Upper Peru (now Bolivia). The rebellion was the first large-scale attempt at an independence movement in Latin America and the largest revolt in the Americas prior to the Spanish American wars of independence and Haitian Revolution.

== Background ==
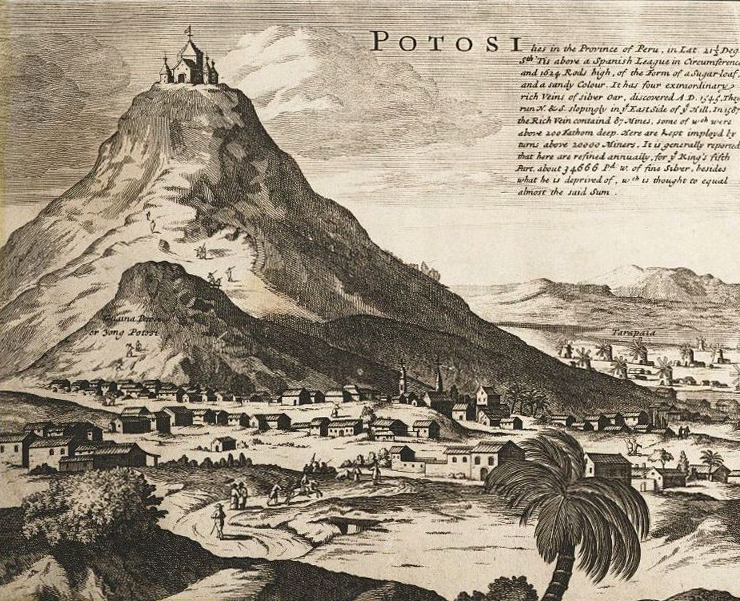
Cerro Rico in Potosí, the largest silver mine in the world, painting form 1715

The government of Spain, to streamline the operation of its colonial empire, began introducing what became known as the Bourbon Reforms throughout South America. In 1776, as part of these reforms, it created the Viceroyalty of the Río de la Plata by separating Upper Peru (modern Bolivia) and the territory that is now Argentina from the Viceroyalty of Peru. These territories included the economically important silver mines at Potosí, whose economic benefits began to flow to Buenos Aires in the east instead of Cuzco and Lima to the west. The economic hardship this introduced to parts of the Altiplano combined with systemic oppression of indigenous and mestizo underclasses (a recurring source of localized uprisings throughout Spanish colonial South America) to create an environment in which a large-scale uprising could occur.

In 1778 Spain raised sales taxes (known as the alcabala) on goods such as rum and pulque (the common alcoholic beverages of the peasants and commoners) while tightening the rest of its tax system in its colonies, in part to fund its participation in the American Revolutionary War. José Gabriel Condorcanqui, an upper-class indigenous leader with claims to the Inca royal lineage, adopted the name Túpac Amaru II (alluding to Túpac Amaru, the last Inca emperor), and in 1780 called for rebellion. He claimed to be acting on behalf of the King of Spain, enforcing royal authority on the corrupt and treacherous colonial administration. In 1780, during the rebellion, Fernando Vélaz de Medrano, 4th Marquess of Tabuérniga, informed the Prince of Asturias (the future Charles IV of Spain) about the rebellion and widespread corruption among royal officials in South America, particularly regarding the playing card and tobacco monopolies imposed by Minister José de Gálvez, which were seen as a catalyst for the unrest.

Túpac Amaru was motivated in part by reading of a prophecy that the Inca would rule again with British support. He may have been aware of the British colonial rebellion in North America and Spanish involvement in the war. Additionally, the growth of mining as a source of colonial revenue was largely caused by the increased burden placed on indigenous workers who formed the base of the labor used to mine silver, leading to increased unrest.

== First phase ==
=== Capture and execution of Antonio de Arriaga ===
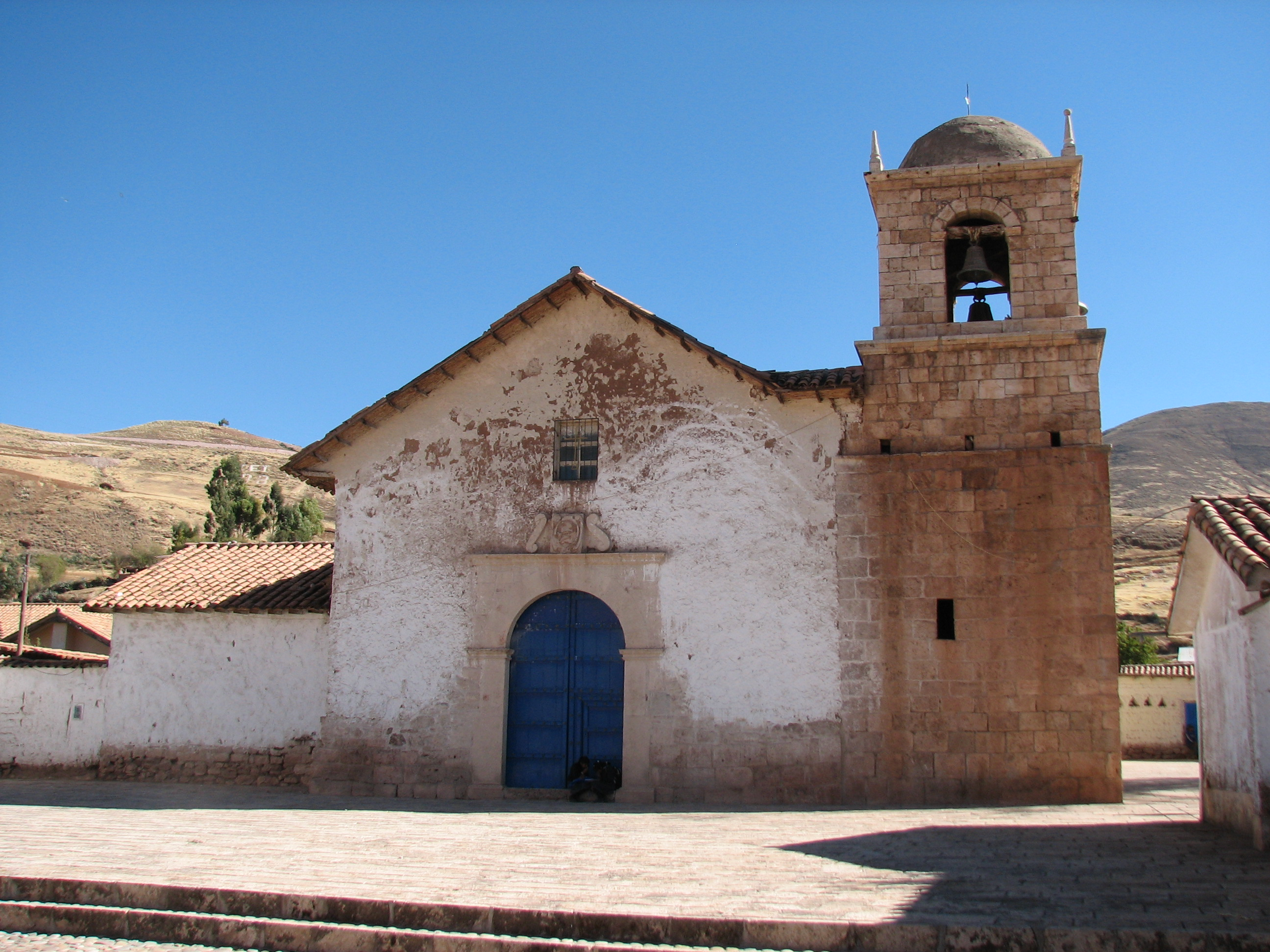
Present day church of Tinta.

On 4 November 1780, after a celebration of the king Charles III in Yanaoca, where cacique Túpac Amaru II and supporters seized Antonio Arriaga, the corregidor of his hometown of Tinta and interim Governor of Tucumán. They forced him to write letters to his treasurer in Tinta requesting money and arms and to other influential individuals and kurakas ordering them to congregate in Tungasuca, where Arriaga was being held prisoner. While Arriaga was being kept in the basement of Túpac Amaru and Micaela Bastidas's home, Túpac Amaru traveled to Arriaga's home in Tinta to seize arms, money, and resources. On 10 November, six days after his capture, Arriaga was executed by hanging by his slave, in front of thousands of gathered indigenous, mestizos, and criollos (locals of recognized Spanish descent).

On 16 November 1780, Túpac Amaru issued a proclamation decreeing the emancipation of Afro-Peruvian and African slaves. In this document, he exhorted all "decent" Spaniards, the clergy, and others friendly with the Peruvian population to join the fight against the hostilities and abuses of the European population; and all those who had been mistreated by the "chapetones" (a derogatory term for Spaniards), including slaves, to abandon them. This decision served a tactical purpose: with the escape of the slaves, the colonial export economy would collapse and the rebel forces would grow. Furthermore, the psychological effect was that in Lima, the upper classes on their haciendas would be more concerned about the defiant slaves and the free blacks and mulattos than about the population of the highlands. These also included ending the mita rotational labor system and limiting the power of the corregidor and thus amplifying his power as cacique and Túpac sought to create a new audiencia at Cusco.

According to the testimony of two possible rebels, Pascual Gutiérrez Sonco and Manuel Chuquipata, captured in December by the mayor of Carabuco, Túpac Amaru requested that his troops use crosses to distinguish themselves. Those who were not indigenous wore paper crosses on their hats, while the indigenous ones wore straw crosses.

=== Expansion of the rebellion ===
Following the assassination of Arriaga, Túpac began moving through the countryside, gaining supporters, primarily from the indigenous and mestizo classes, but also with some creoles and freed slaves. Creole Antonio de Figueroa joined the rebels, commanding the artillery regiment.

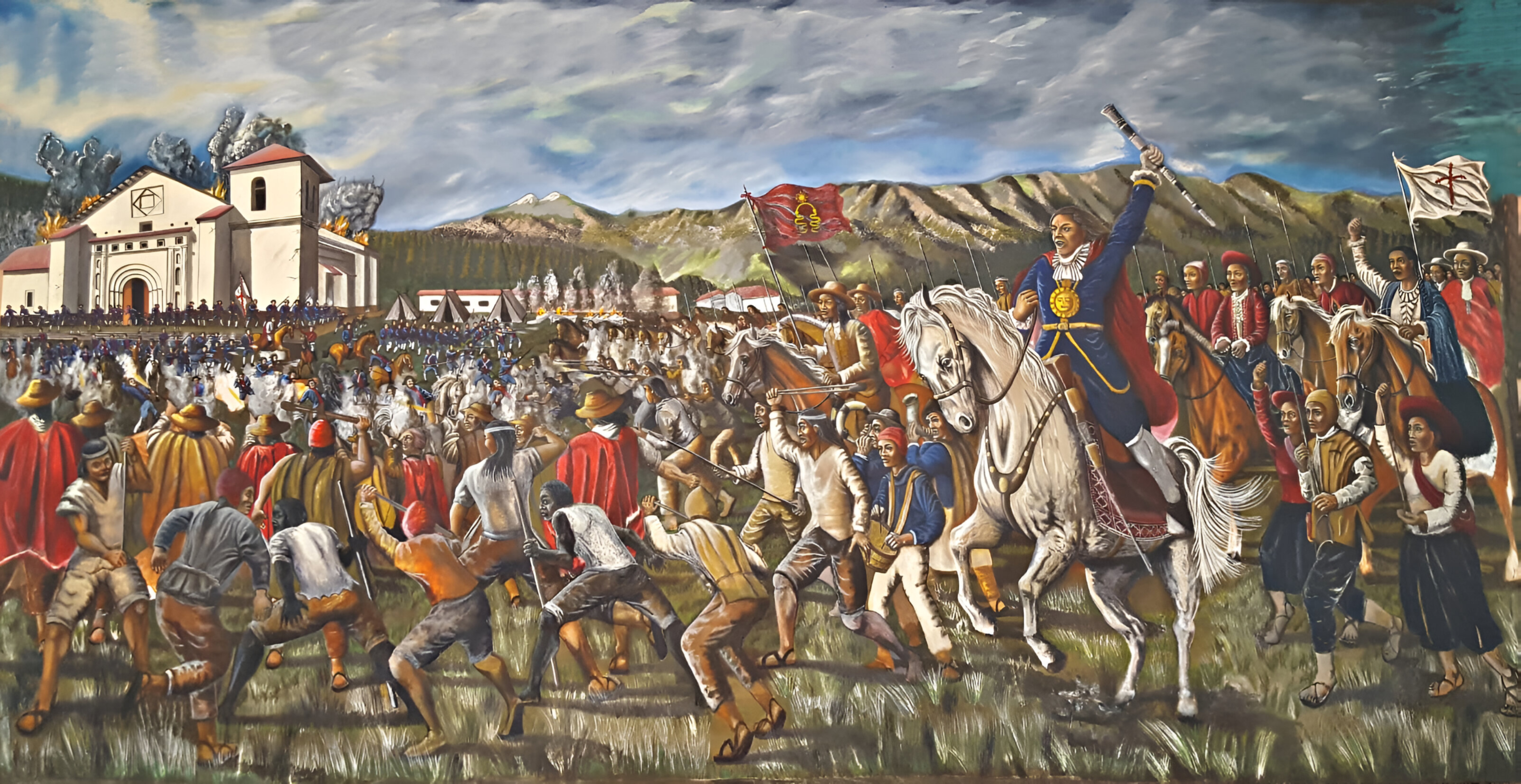
Rebel forces assaulting Spanish militia in the Battle of Sangarará

On 17 November, the forces sent by the Spanish authorities in Cusco arrived at the town of Sangarará, camping around the church. The Spanish militia were led by corregidores Tiburcio Landa, Fernando Cabrera, and Pedro Sahuaraura. There was poor communication and much disagreement on location of the Spanish camp between the corregidores. On the morning of 18 November, Túpac Amaru's army, which had grown to several thousand men, defeated them at the Battle of Sangarará. Tomasa Tito Condemayta led a women's garrison during the battle. A cartridge of a Spanish soldier caught fire and burned the church. Túpac then turned south, against the advice of his wife and lieutenant Micaela Bastidas, who urged him to attack Cusco before the government could mobilize. Micaela Bastidas was a pivotal force in the rebellion and is often overlooked. Bastidas was known for leading an uprising in the Tungasuca region. Indigenous communities often sided with the rebels, and local militias put up little resistance. It was not long before Túpac's forces had taken control of almost the entire southern Peruvian plateau.

Following his victory at Sangarará, Túpac Amaru returned triumphantly to Tungasuca in mid-November 1780. He and Micaela Bastidas, however, were aware that they had only defeated the first wave sent by the hastily organized junta in the city of Cusco, and they expected a fierce royalist offensive from Peru's second-largest city, Cusco. They were also concerned about an attack by viceroyal troops from the south, either from the Lake Titicaca area or from the city of Arequipa to the southwest. Many in the rebel camp believed that the royalists would first reinforce their forces at their base in the Sacred Valley before advancing north toward the city of Cusco. However, Túpac Amaru planned his strategy southward, towards Lake Titicaca, a predominantly indigenous area where his message of freedom would be very well received in a region that endured the abuses of the mining mita, particularly for the silver mines of Potosí. The Aymara leader, Túpac Katari, claimed to be the viceroy appointed by Tupac Amaru II and led his forces to besiege the city of La Paz with his wife Bartolina Sisa in March 1781.

=== Spanish reaction ===
90 kilometers away in Cusco, Bishop Juan Manuel Moscoso y Peralta directed the royalist efforts, raising money, organizing processions, and communicating with the authorities in Lima, his priests in rebel territory, and the militia leaders. News of the Túpac Amaru uprising and the execution of Arriaga reached Lima on 24 November 1780, causing alarm in the city. Viceroy Agustín de Jáuregui convened an emergency meeting with the Inspector General of the Navy, Commander José del Valle, the Inspector General José Antonio de Areche, and the members of the Supreme Court. On November 28, Colonel Gabriel de Avilés, departed for Cusco at the head of a select cavalry squadron of 200 members of the militia of the "free pardos" (people of mixed race), with orders to recruit soldiers along their march to Cusco and, if necessary, to bring men from Arequipa.

=== Túpac Amaru's campaigns in the south ===
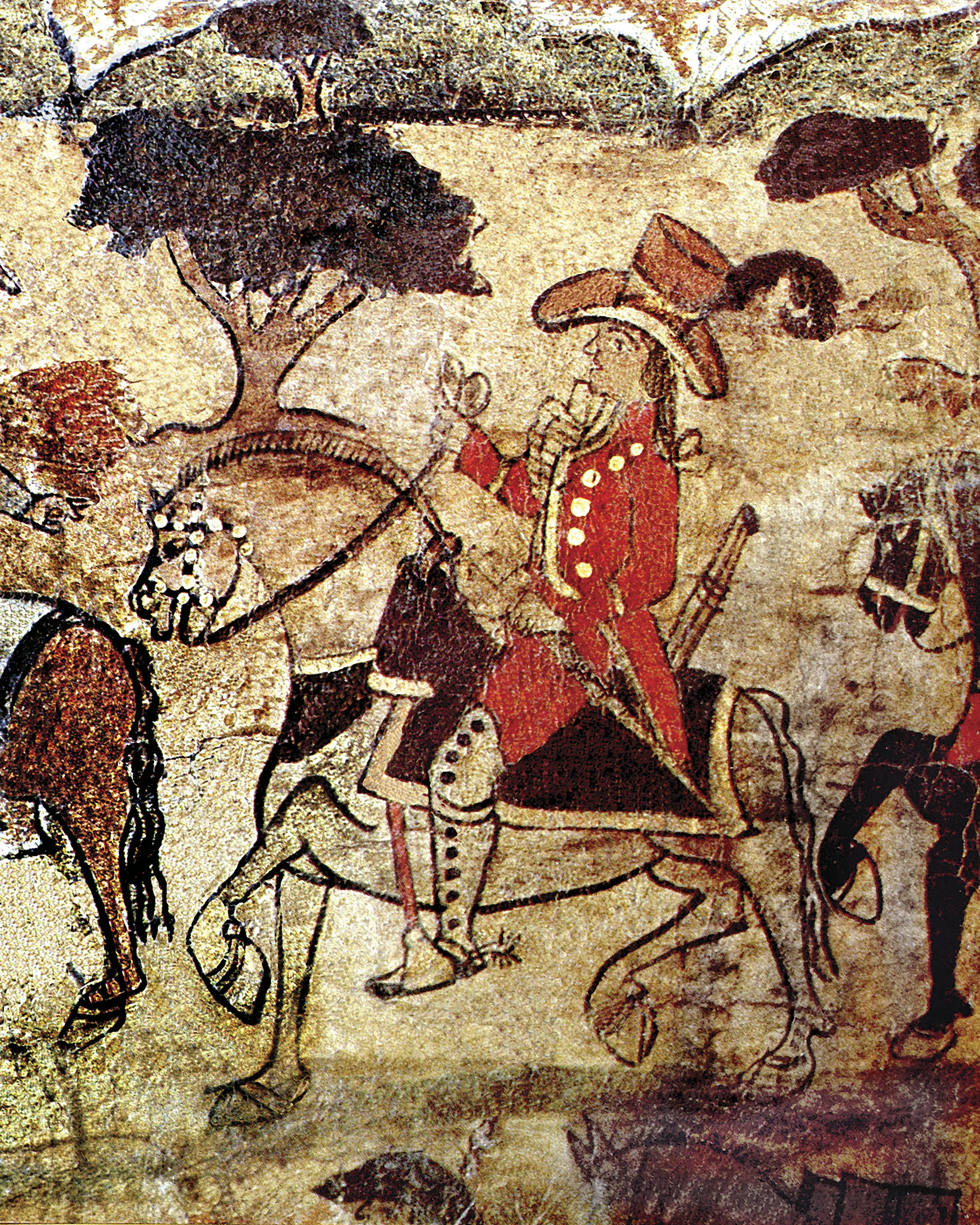
Painting Túpac Amaru II by Tadeo Escalante (1802-1840)

The rebel troops left Tungasuca on 22 November, heading towards the towns of Pichigu, Yauri, and Coporaque, where the royalist curaca Eugenio Sinayuca was proselytizing against the rebellion. The rebel tactic followed a standard procedure: while scouts searched for enemies and supplies, Túpac Amaru delivered a passionate speech about his movement from the church steps. Many listeners joined the rebel forces, and on 25 November, Túpac Amaru wrote a proclamation addressed to the population of Lampa, announcing his campaign against Spanish tyranny and abuses, as well as his commitment to the Creoles; at the same time, he boasted of having 6,000 followers, including indigenous people, Creoles, and people from outside the area.

After attacking the mining town of Caylloma in late November, from which Spanish officials fled with large amounts of money from the royal treasuries and silver, Túpac Amaru's forces crossed the glacier-covered mountains of La Raya, the dividing line between Cusco and Puno.

In mid-November, the royalists had captured Simón Noguera, nephew of Túpac Amaru, at the Queque hacienda, near Santa Rosa, while he was carrying out reconnaissance duties and delivering letters and proclamations inciting rebellion; and, despite the pleas of the local residents, the corregidor Horé pronounced the death sentence. The corregidores of Chucuito, Lampa, Azángaro, Puno, and Carabaya, met in a junta in Lampa on December 4, where they oversaw Noguera's execution. The death of her nephew caused grief to Micaela Bastidas; and Túpac Amaru, who vowed revenge, ordered one rebel group to occupy the Queque hacienda, while another marched to Lampa, from where the corregidores fled and deserters joined Túpac Amaru's side. The leader and his troops triumphantly entered Ayaviri on December 6, where the priests met with them formally and Túpac Amaru gave a speech to recruit men for his army and reassure the Creoles and mestizos.

From Lampa, where he stayed for three days, Túpac Amaru considered going to Upper Peru to join the rebels there led by Túpac Katari, who had begun the Siege of Sorata. He also contemplated the possibility of attacking Arequipa or laying siege to Puno; however, numerous letters from Micaela Bastidas persuaded him to return. Correspondence between Túpac Amaru and his wife revealed their concern that the royalists would attack Tungasuca.

=== Diego Cristóbal's campaign in the north ===
Diego Cristóbal Túpac Amaru, José Gabriel's first cousin, led 6,000 followers toward Paucartambo and the Sacred Valley with the strategy of separating this important agricultural area from the city of Cusco and, if successful in that campaign, attacking the city from the fortress of Sacsayhuamán.

Preparing the attack on Paucartambo, rebel forces recruited people in the highland towns of Ocongate, Caicay and Ccata, and then approached Pisac along the Vilcanota River. The commanders of the Cusco War Junta, concerned about this rebel offensive, sent their militias as reinforcements on December 8, along with rifles and ammunition commanded by Lorenzo Pérez Lechuga, a veteran of the Spanish wars in Italy, who joined the defense of Paucartambo, led by Major Francisco Celorio. With the support of the troops of the curacas of Chinchero, Maras and Huayllabamba, the royalists managed to defeat Diego Cristóbal's forces near the Pisac bridge, preventing them from taking this important crossing, and ended the battle by massacring all the prisoners. In retaliation, in Calca, the rebels killed all Europeans indiscriminately under the premise of "killing everyone who wore a shirt".

Building on their victory at Pisac, the royalist army decided to advance into territory controlled by the Tupacamarista forces. On December 26, 1780, led by the curaca of Chincheros, Mateo Pumacahua, the royalist troops defeated the rebels at Calca, causing hundreds of casualties and once again executing all the prisoners. The cabildo of Cusco described this bloody rebel defeat as a "glorious triumph", raising the morale of the royalist troops and civilians while weakening the rebels. On December 21, two leagues from Cusco, on the Chita plain, a rebel uprising broke out and attacked a royalist battalion led by Francisco Laisequilla, who, with the help of reinforcements from Anta and Abancay, defeated them and returned to Cusco with 25 prisoners and four heads of leaders impaled on pikes, displaying them around the main square.

In light of this situation, Diego Cristóbal, who had been directing a prolonged siege of Paucartambo, decided to withdraw to the hills above the Sacred Valley, abandoning his plan to encircle Cusco from the north.

The events in the Sacred Valley and its surrounding highlands marked a change in the use and understanding of violence by both sides. By mid-December, both sides believed that the other sought to exterminate them, and consequently responded to brutality with brutality. The burning of the church in Sangarará and the excommunication of Túpac Amaru allowed the royalists to regard the rebels as non-Christians and heretics, which enabled their leaders to justify cruel treatment, such as that inflicted by Pumacahua on the victims of the massacre at Calca. On the revolutionary side, according to historian Jan Szeminski, the rebels portrayed the Spanish as "evil" or "diabolical" Christians, whose actions placed them outside the church and who therefore deserved a brutal death. Although Túpac Amaru and Micaela Bastidas sought to prevent violence, they could not stop radical insurgents miles away from killing anyone of European descent or culture. Likewise, the worst atrocities took place when the principal rebel commander was not present.

=== Siege of Cusco ===
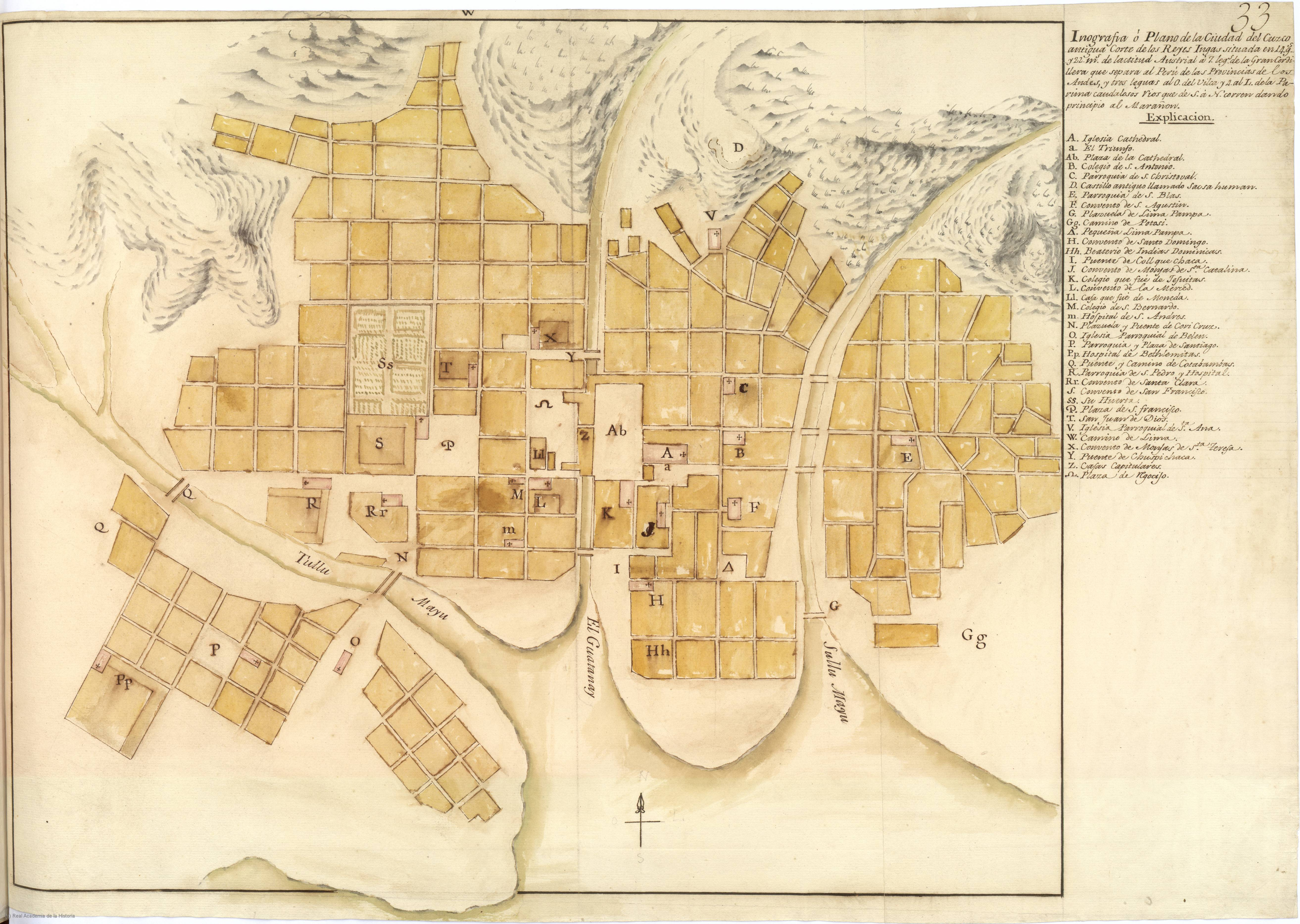
18th century map of Cusco

Túpac Amaru had received news of an impending attack on Tinta, which was why he quickly returned to Tungasuca without encountering any obstacles, where he was triumphantly received on December 17. Seeking to maintain the advantages gained at Quiquijana, Sangarará, and Lampa, he decided to anticipate the enemy and go on the offensive. With the effective assistance of his wife, Micaela Bastidas, and a group of his captains, the rebel leader began preparations for the great expedition against Cusco.

The revolutionary army at that time had approximately one thousand rifles. They also cast small cannons and manufactured gunpowder, lances, and other small arms. Its forces consisted of around 5,000 armed and trained men, accompanied by a much larger group that would grow as a result of the recruitment of people from the surrounding areas.

On December 20, Túpac Amaru ordered his army to depart for the city of Cusco. Advancing rapidly through the province of Quispicanchi, he followed the route through neighboring towns from the south. Antonio Castelo led a smaller vanguard group through the valley with orders to recruit, attack royalist forces, plunder haciendas, and surround the city from the north. Meanwhile, Diego Cristóbal returned to the Sacred Valley with the intention of opening a second front.

On 23 December, the war council of Cusco learned of Túpac Amaru's plans to attack Cusco. The city was defended by a disciplined army of 3,000 men, suitably armed. The Cabildo and the war council established their headquarters in the former school of the Jesuits, which had been used by the order until its expulsion in 1767, on the corner of the Plaza de Armas. The royalists organized patrols, especially at night, and formed six militia companies, purchasing or requisitioning weapons and ammunition, and training clergy and students. Bishop Moscoso led efforts to raise funds for the purchase or manufacture of weapons to equip the militias, collecting the considerable sum of 110,881 pesos between November and December. Fearing internal traitors, anyone was prohibited from leaving the city in the days preceding the arrival of the rebel army. On 19 December, Father Ignacio de Santiesteban Ruiz Cano wrote from the highland provinces southwest of Tungasuca that he needed reinforcements, as the indigenous people simply laughed at his exhortations to remain loyal.

Falling for Antonio Castelo's diversionary maneuver, the royalists sent troops to Angostura, the entrance to Cusco from the Vilcanota Valley. Moving swiftly and accustomed to the steep topography of the area, Túpac Amaru and much of his army avoided the enemy by taking a less direct route through the imposing mountain peaks south of the valley. Despite their numbers, they quickly and silently reached Cusco, which they besieged by increasing their numbers, shouting, singing, beating drums, setting off fireworks, and firing weapons, managing to intimidate all those who saw or heard them. According to one witness, the mountain "looked like the back of a porcupine, with 40,000 rebels serving as its spines."

Despite these maneuvers, the rebel forces did not immediately attack Cusco because Túpac Amaru expected the city to join his cause, sending detailed letters to Bishop Moscoso y Peralta, the people of Cusco, and the Cabildo. They rejected the letters while, unlike what had occurred in the areas around Tinta and the Collao, the indigenous people and other inhabitants of Cusco and its surroundings did not join the rebel side en masse, either because their curacas prevented them from doing so or because they did not wish to. Later analysts consider Túpac Amaru's letters to provide insight into his ideas and plans. They indicate his efforts to maintain or gain the support of average mestizos and criollos, and perhaps his confidence that the city would rise up and support him. They also suggest that the revolutionary leader sought to take the city without bloodshed. Most, however, regard the correspondence as a curious but significant waste of time, allowing the city's authorities to prepare and Avilés's troops to arrive.

After receiving news of Túpac Amaru's victorious return from the south, the War Junta of Cusco had sent successive messengers urging the authorities in Lima to send reinforcements, which prompted Colonel Avilés to accelerate his advance through forced marches, with the troops entering Cusco on 1 January 1781.

On 2 January, alerted by the priest of Urcos, the cavalry of the Royalists, commanded by Joaquín de Varcárcel and Francisco Laisequilla, destroyed Castelo's vanguard in the town of Saylla, killing 400 rebels and capturing a flag bearing the coat of arms of Túpac Amaru. In the Sacred Valley of the Incas, Diego Cristóbal Túpac Amaru advanced from Ccatca to Písac, but the royalists, commanded by Pumacahua, stopped him at Huayllabamba and at Yucay. Despite reinforcements sent by Túpac Amaru, Diego Cristóbal was unable to break through the royalist forces at the strategically important Urubamba Bridge.

On 4 January, Túpac Amaru ordered his troops to move around the city, beginning the Battle of Cusco, which would last for a week. Both sides engaged in bloody hand-to-hand combat, with weapons and cannons adding to the carnage. The revolutionary army attacked with bravery and tenacity, encouraged by Túpac Amaru, who rode a white horse and shared in all the risks of the siege. Likewise, the general staff of the defenders of Cusco performed their duties effectively, with the participation of the Bishop and the Mayor being particularly notable. Reinforced by 8,000 men commanded by the corregidor of Paruro and his loyal caciques, the forces defending the city numbered more than 12,000 soldiers.

Finally, discouraged by the lack of support from the city's population and the desertions caused by the harsh conditions of the rebel camp in the hills of Cusco, and refusing to massacre the indigenous troops that the royalists placed in the vanguard, Túpac Amaru ordered the end of the siege on January 11, 1781.

=== Spanish punitive expedition ===
Led by the visitador general, Antonio de Areche, and the inspector general, José del Valle, approximately 15,000 troops entered Cusco as reinforcements on 24 February. The official count listed 17,116 soldiers in Cusco in March, although the actual number may have exceeded 20,000 troops. These troops were also equipped with more than 1,000 fusils (flintlock muskets that had replaced the arquebus) as well as numerous cannons.

The royalist army divided its troops into six columns to converge on the rebel base around Tinta. Del Valle's plan involved advancing two columns from the east, two more from the west, while the reserve corps and artillery attacked from the center. Simultaneously, the two detachments would prevent the rebel retreat to the northwest. All the columns were to meet before reaching the town of Tinta and attack together, continuing on to the southern provinces and from there linking up with the troops of Upper Peru in the Lake Titicaca region. In Cusco, Antonio de Areche remained in command of 1,000 soldiers from the Pardos de Lima company, a group of volunteers from Ayacucho, the Cusco militia, and numerous indigenous troops commanded by royalist kurakas.

Areche publicly recognized royalist supporters and conferred the rank of captain upon Mateo Pumacahua and other royalist kurakas. Days later, he issued a widely distributed decree, offering a pardon to rebels who surrendered their weapons and appeared in the city, excluding 35 people from this decree, including Micaela Bastidas, Túpac Amaru, his family, and his leading commanders. Seeking to divide the rebels, the inspector also offered a reward of eighty pesos a month to anyone who betrayed their leaders.

Thousands of uniformed troops, with their weapons gleaming under the sun, impressed and intimidated the local population, changing the nature of the conflict. The royalists took the offensive, now having an advantage in armament and cavalry (among the rebels, only the leaders traveled on horseback), and were no longer outnumbered. Despite this, the royalist forces also faced difficulties: feeding such a large army, as it advanced farther and farther beyond Cusco, was difficult, and they suffered from cold and hunger due to a lack of supplies. Furthermore, when they marched through narrow valleys, the rebels harassed them from the peaks and ambushed them. Another significant problem, especially for those from the coast, was the thin air. Short of food and oxygen, the horses refused to continue, and within a matter of weeks all but the commanders would travel on foot; little more than a month after the parade of gallant horses through the streets of Cusco, the royalists were forced to abandon them and even eat them. Despite their organization, weapons, and numbers, the royalists proved not to be the invincible force that many had believed them to be upon their arrival in Cusco.

=== Tinta campaign ===
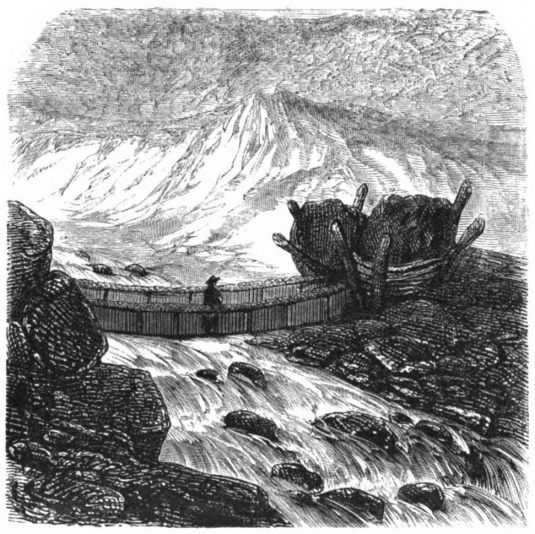
Crisnejos Bridge in Combapata in the 19th century, Le tour du Monde

Del Valle believed that Túpac Amaru intended to return south and also seize the important agricultural area of Paucartambo. For this reason, the Spanish commander deployed the royalist columns in a fan-shaped formation, with the first and sixth advancing toward Paucartambo, the fifth making its way westward into Cotabambas Province, while the fourth moved through Paruro, and the second and third columns marched along the valley toward the rebel base at Tinta.

Disappointed by their failure to capture Cusco, and concerned about desertions and difficulties in supplying their troops, Túpac Amaru and Micaela Bastidas still commanded a formidable force. While the uniformed royalist troops intimidated the people of Cusco with their cannons, shotguns, and horses, the rebel forces terrorized the affluent local population, increasing fear amid the lack of control by their leaders, who sought to limit violence and looting. On the other hand, thousands of rebels worked in unison and proved to be formidable adversaries in the rugged terrain south of Cusco. Bishop Moscoso y Peralta lamented in a letter dated 21 January that, on their return to Tungasuca, Túpac Amaru and his forces had fought "with blood and fire", especially against Spaniards and mestizos. The bishop's concern was that they would return to attack Cusco.

Marching without haste, the caudillo crossed the Ocororo plain, entering Oropesa accompanied by his sons Hipólito and Mariano, and his cousin Andrés Noguera. He then continued through Acomayo and returned to Tungasuca between 15 and 17 January and, after a brief rest, marched to the Chumbivilcas Province. Meanwhile, Micaela Bastidas oversaw the construction of fortifications, having anticipated a royalist attack on the rebel base since November. A defensive wall was built outside Combapata, and trenches were dug at Tinta. Túpac Amaru and Micaela rebuilt their forces, recruiting people and encouraging skeptical and frightened followers; deserters and other traitors were threatened with death. Some important followers had abandoned the rebels, including the Castelo clan, led by the patriarch Melchor and his son Antonio. Following the failed siege of Cusco, they organized a mutiny in Sicuani, calling on other criollos to rise up against Túpac Amaru and inviting those who remained loyal to him to betray him. Both the mutiny and the strategy failed, and the rebels killed several members of the Castelo family in an ambush. Sixty-year-old Antonio Castelo surrendered to Del Valle in April, but the royalist authorities treated him as an insurgen commander who had infiltrated their ranks; he was found guilty and executed.

Between January and February, the rebels and royalist forces fought on different fronts. Diego Cristóbal besieged Paucartambo and looted most of the area, although he had little success in taking Calca in the Sacred Valley. The rebel forces continued the struggle from the glacial peaks of Ocongate and Lauramarca. The fifth column was not attacked during its march due to the defection of the rebels from Chuquibamba and, joined by people from Aymaraes, confronted the men of Parvina, Valencia, and Bermúdez. Tomás Parvina, who, like Túpac Amaru, claimed to belong to the Inca lineage, was one of the principal commanders in the region. On January 25, Parvina's forces ambushed the commander royalist Isidoro Gutiérrez at Chahuaytiri and executed him. The fourth column achieved successive victories at Cochiriguay and Accha, capturing Francisco Torres and the elderly Francisco Túpac Amaru, the uncle of the caudillo. While the first and sixth columns experienced minor clashes, the columns marching through the center were constantly harassed while enduring the inclement weather, a lack of provisions, and a shortage of medical services.

Informed by his spies, the Túpac Amaru II's main objective was to destroy the central royalist outpost, where the royalist high command was stationed, for which he devised a ruse. On March 18, he sent word to Del Valle that, on the occasion of the feast of Saint Joseph, he would launch a vigorous attack the following day. Del Valle kept his men on constant alert and slowed their march as a precaution, which caused him to lose sight of the rebels. Túpac Amaru took advantage of this situation to conceal his troops and mislead the royalist command. On March 22, the opportune moment for a surprise attack arose in the frozen region of Pucacasa, beginning the Battle of Pucacasa. But, while the rebel forces were pitching their tents to face the harsh weather, an escaped prisoner reached the royalist camp and warned them of the surprise maneuver that would unfold that night. Forewarned of the attack, Del Valle took every precaution and remained on the lookout. When the attack began, the rebels were met with heavy rifle fire and failed to gain control of the royalist camp and withdrew the following day. Despite the warning, Del Valle's troops barely managed to repel the attack after receiving reinforcements from the column led by Juan Manuel Campero, suffering major losses. Del Valle witnessed his troops collapsing in the snow, exhausted from days without sleep, hunger, and extreme cold. For this reason, he began his retreat to the royalist base in the Sacred Valley, where the general suffered desertion from indigenous troops, although the members of the black militia and Pumacahua's forces remained loyal to the royalists.

After the disaster at Pucacasa, Del Valle led his troops toward Tinta, the rebel stronghold. At Urcos, the rebels cut the bridge, causing the royalists to lose several days crossing the Urubamba River. The royalists then captured Quiquijana, which had been abandoned by the rebels. In retaliation, the Spanish commander hanged Luis Pomainga, a distant relative of Túpac Amaru, and others he considered rebels. Believing Tupac Amaru would head to Paucartambo, Del Valle planned to fan out the royalists columns to surround the main rebel army. Tupac Amaru's captains, Tomás Parvina and Felipe Miguel Bermúdez in Chumbivilcas, faced with desertion and depletion on resources, attacked Del Valle in the town of Santo Tomás on 21 March, in a last attempt to halt royalist advance. Del Valle described the courage of both Parvina and Bermúdez, who died fighting beneath the only cannon. After the battle, the royalists executed the prisoners and paraded the heads of Parvina and Bermúdez on pikes. Pedro Vilcapaza and his second in command Ramón Ponce, confronted royalists around Puno, preparing for a siege on the city. On April 6, Areche complained that the Cusco region "is more disturbed and rebellious than ever."

After delays caused by crossing the river at Urcos and waiting for the last columns from Cusco, the royalist army descended into the valley toward the rebel base. Túpac Amaru's forces harassed their enemies from Urcos to Combapata with guerrilla attacks and artillery fire from their only mobile cannon. By the end of March, the royalist forces were approaching the rebel base north of Tinta, in the hills above the valley where the Salca River flows into the Urubamba. Thanks to deserters, the royalists learned that the rebels were suffering from a shortage of supplies.

On the night of April 4, the rebels attacked royalists Villalta's second column in Combapata, which had arrived that same day, beheading four sentries. However, a fifth sentry fired his weapon, and the suddenly woke up the other columns. With volleys of rifle fire, they forced the rebels to abandon the heights and enter the valley and started the Battle of Combapata. In open battle, on relatively flat and open terrain, and without the element of surprise, the royalists had the advantage. Using their superior cavalry and weaponry, the royalists attacked, encircling their enemies, probably informed of their strength and exact location by a deserter. Túpac Amaru, who was in the midst of his troops, managed to evade the encirclement by diving into the Urubamba River, even at the risk of drowning. It took the royalists hours to cross the river because the rebels had destroyed the only bridge. A day later, the rebel forces who retreated from the battle, without the leadership of Túpac Amaru, confronted royalists in the Battle of Checacupe, suffering defeat.

=== Capture of Túpac Amaru II ===
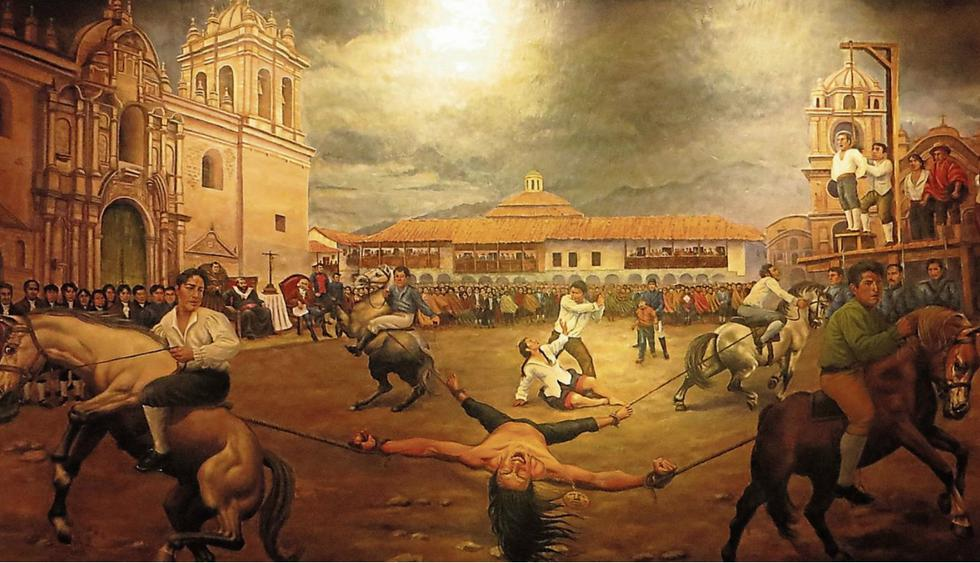
First attempt of execution of Túpac Amaru II.

After the battle of Combapata and Checacupe, Tupac Amaru managed to escape, with rebel forces destroying the bridges crossing the Urubamba River, halting royalists to pursue Tupac Amaru. Tupac Amaru was able to retreat to Langui where he was received by Colonel Ventura Landaeta and Captain Francisco de la Cruz, who urged him to rest before continuing his journey.

Amaru II was betrayed by Landaeta and de la Cruz, which led to his capture, along with battalion leader Tomasa Tito Condemayta. On April 7, Landaeta and de la Cruz also handed over to the royalists Micaela Bastidas, her two sons, Hipólito and Fernando, other members of her family and rebel captains, who were seeking to escape to La Paz through Livitaca. A well-armed battalion transferred Túpac Amaru and around thirty prisoners to Tinta. In the following days, the authorities hanged 67 lower-ranking followers who had previously been captured. Rumors spread that Diego Cristóbal would attempt to rescue the prisoners on the road from Urcos to Cusco, so the royalists reinforced the substantial and well-armed troops guarding them, all of whom were bound and chained hand and foot.

On 15 May 1781, Túpac was sentenced to death, and on 18 May forced to witness the execution of his wife and one of his children before he was himself quartered. Túpac's youngest son, Fernando was imprisoned and exiled to Africa until being moved to Cádiz. The location of the executions was in the center of the Plaza de Armas of Cusco. The four horses running in opposite directions failed to tear his limbs apart, and so Túpac was beheaded. Despite the death of Túpac Amaru II, the rebellion continued until 1783 by his relatives other leaders.

== Second phase ==
=== Diego Cristóbal and Túpac Katari ===
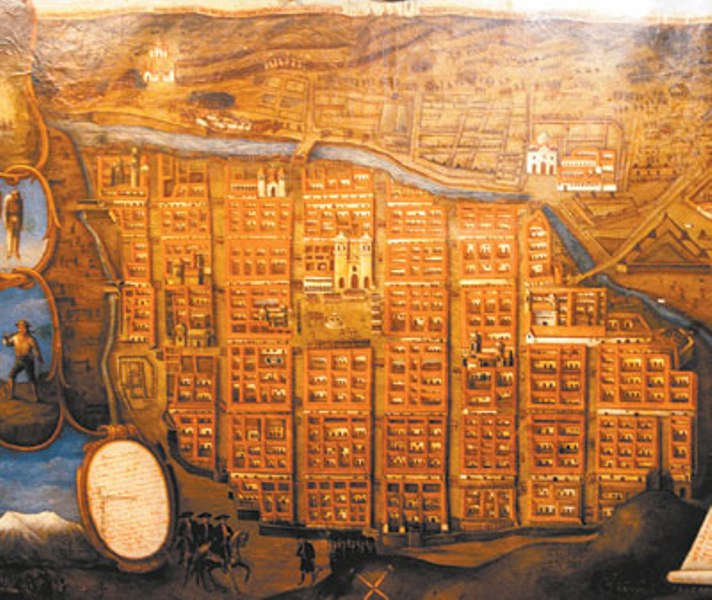
Siege of La Paz led by Túpac Katari in 1781, painting by Alejandro René Gonzáles Estrada.

Túpac Amaru's capture and execution did not end the rebellion. In his place, his surviving relatives, namely his cousin Diego Cristóbal Túpac Amaru, continued the rebellion, albeit using guerilla tactics, and transferred the rebellion's focal point to the Collao highlands around Lake Titicaca. Andrés Túpac Amaru, nephew of Túpac Amaru II, led a troop to join Túpac Katari, who besieged La Paz again in August 1781. Government efforts to destroy the rebellion were frustrated by, among other things, a high desertion rate, hostile locals, scorched-earth tactics, the onset of winter, and the region's altitude (most of the troops were from the lowlands and had trouble adjusting). An army led by Diego Cristóbal occupied the strategically important city of Puno on 7 May 1781 and proceeded to use it as a base from which they launched attacks all across Upper Peru. Cristóbal would hold the town and much of the surrounding territory until mounting losses and diminishing support convinced him to accept a general amnesty from Viceroy Agustín de Jáuregui. A preliminary treaty and prisoner exchange were conducted on 12 December, and Cristóbal's forces formally surrendered on 26 January 1782. Though some rebels resisted, the worst was over. The last organized remnants of the rebellion would be vanquished by May 1782, though sporadic violence continued for many months.

=== Betrayal ===
Diego, his mother, and several of his allies would be arrested and executed anyway by Spanish authorities in Cuzco on 19 July 1783 on the pretext he had broken the peace accords.

During the rebellion, especially after the death of Túpac Amaru II, non-natives were systematically killed by the rebels. Some historians have described these killings aimed at non-natives, in conjunction with attempts to violently eradicate various non-native cultural customs, as genocidal in nature.

== Women in the rebellion ==
Throughout the mid-1700s, women had a changing role throughout Latin America. They began getting involved politically, economically, and culturally. Women had begun getting involved in the workforce, particularly producing cotton cloth and working as market traders. Because of these growing gender role changes, women were involved in the Túpac Amaru II revolt. Túpac's wife, Micaela Bastidas, had commanded her battalion, and she and her battalion were responsible for the uprising in the San Felipe de Tungasucan region. Micaela Bastidas and Bartolina Sisa took part in demonstrations against high prices, food distribution networks, racist treatment of Natives, high taxes, and tightening restrictions on the colonies. In addition, Tomasa Tito Condemayta played a major role for the rebels in leading her own battalion, along with Gregoria Apaza commanding her army in the Siege of La Paz. Although women were involved in the revolution and had a very active role throughout their villages, leading to independence throughout the region, they had received little attention for their efforts.

== Aftermath ==
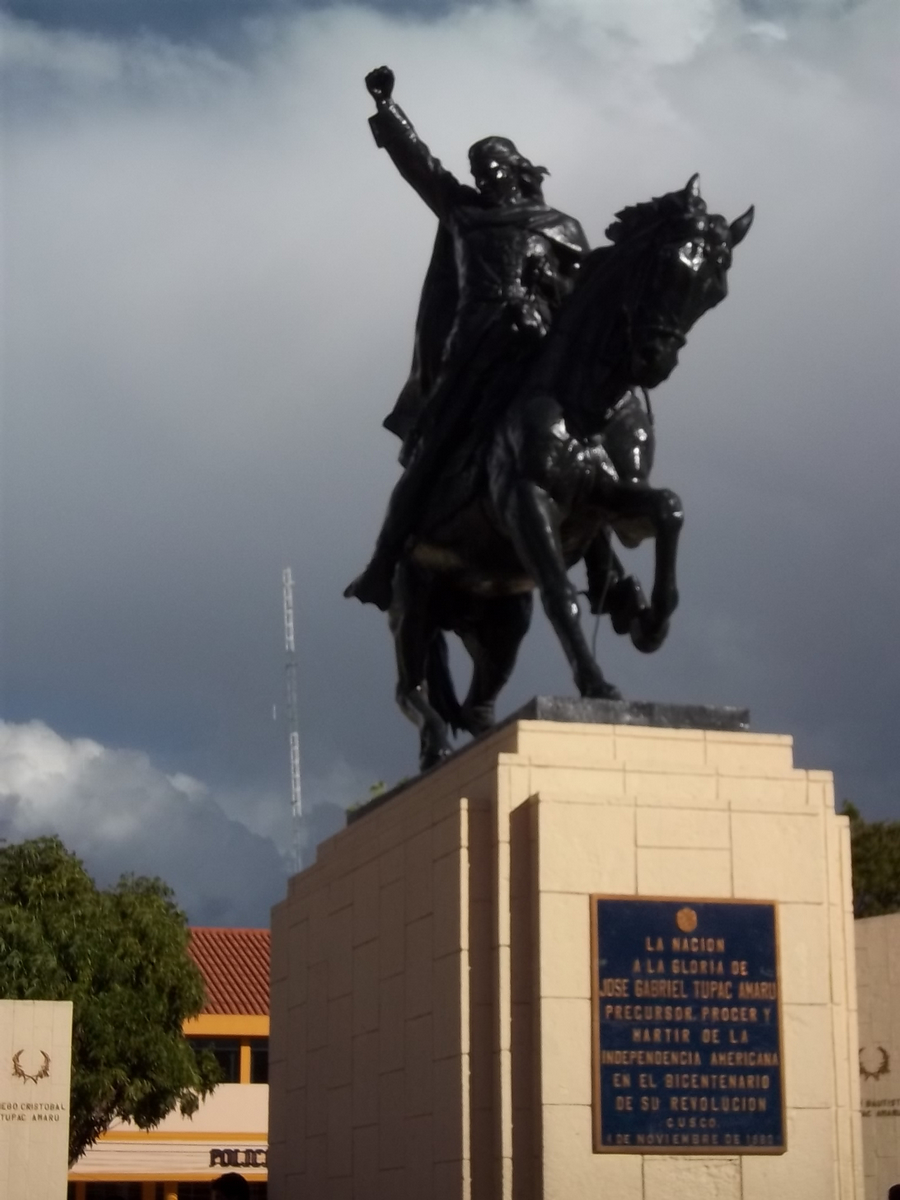
Monumental of Túpac Amaru II in Cusco

The ultimate death toll is estimated at 100,000 indigenous and 10,000–40,000 non-natives.

Viceroy Jáuregui lessened mita obligations in an attempt to ameliorate some of the indigenous peoples' complaints. In 1784, his successor, Teodoro de Croix, abolished the corregidors and reorganized the colonial administration around eight intendants. In 1787, an audiencia was established in Cuzco.

Areche's decrees following the execution of Túpac Amaru II included the banning of the Quechua language, the wearing of indigenous clothing, and virtually any mention or commemoration of Inca culture and history. Areche's attempts to destroy Inca culture after the execution of Túpac Amaru II were confirmed by royal decree in April 1782; however, colonial authorities lacked the resources to enforce these laws, and they were soon largely forgotten. Still, paintings depicting the Inca were destroyed, and the juridical institution of the cacique was abolished, with many caciques being replaced by administrators from outside the native locality. This undermined the power of indigenous rulership despite concessions from the viceroyalty.

== See also ==
- Revolt of the Comuneros, a 1781 revolt in the Viceroyalty of New Granada caused by the Bourbon Reforms
- Huilliche uprising of 1792, an indigenous uprising in southern Chile against Spanish encroachment.

== Sources ==
- Meade, Teresa (2016). History of modern Latin America – 1800 to the present (Second ed.). John Wiley & Sons. ISBN 978-1-118-77248-5.
