= Sangarará, Peru =

Village in Acomayo province, Peru

Coordinates: 13°57′S 71°36′W

Sangarará is a small village in Peru, located in the Cusco Region, and more specifically in the Sangarará District of the Acomayo Province. Sangarará is located at 13° 57' 18 S, 71° 36' 10 W.

The village was the site of a significant victory for rebel forces under Túpac Amaru II in 1780 in the Battle of Sangarará.
