= Puka Q'asa =

Puka Q'asa (Quechua puka red, q'asa mountain pass, "red mountain pass", Hispanicized spellings Puca Ccasa, Puca Khasa, Pucacasa, Pucaccasa, Puca Jasa, Pucajasa) may refer to:

- Puka Q'asa (Angaraes), a mountain in the Angaraes Province, Huancavelica Region, Peru
- Puka Q'asa (Canchis), a mountain in the Canchis Province, Cusco Region, Peru
- Puka Q'asa (Castrovirreyna-Huancavelica), a mountain on the border of the Castrovirreyna Province and the Huancavelica Province, Huancavelica Region, Peru
- Puka Q'asa (Huancavelica), a mountain in the Huancavelica Province, Huancavelica Region, Peru
- Puka Q'asa (Huaytará), a mountain in the Huaytará Province, Huancavelica Region, Peru
- Puka Q'asa (Urubamba), a mountain in the Urubamba Province, Cusco Region, Peru
