= Calca =

Calca may refer to:

- Calca Peninsula, a peninsula in South Australia
- Calca Province, one of thirteen provinces in the Cusco Region of Peru
- Calca District, one of the eight districts in the Calca Province
- Calca, Peru, capital of the Calca District and Province
- Calca, South Australia, a settlement on the west coast of Eyre Peninsula
- CALCA, the abbreviation for calcitonin-related polypeptide alpha
