= Paucartambo =

Paucartambo may refer to:

- Paucartambo Province, Cusco region
- Paucartambo District, Paucartambo
- Paucartambo District, Pasco
- Paucartambo, Paucartambo
- Paucartambo, Pasco Province
