= Tomasa Tito Condemayta =

Doña Tomasa Ttito Condemayta

Cacica of Acos, Acomayo, and Sangarará
- Reign: c. 1770 – 18 May 1781
- Born: Tomasa Ttito Condemayta Hurtado de Mendoza; 1729; Cuzco, Viceroyalty of Peru
- Died: May 18, 1781 (aged 51–52); Cuzco, Viceroyalty of Peru
- Spouse: Tomás Escalante or Faustino Delgado (disputed)
- Issue: Unnamed daughter
- Military service
- Allegiance: Inca Empire
- Branch: Túpac Amaru II's neo-Inca army
- Service years: 1780–1781
- Rank: Cacica
- Commands: Unnamed battalion
- Conflicts: Rebellion of Túpac Amaru II: Battle of Sangarará

Doña Tomasa Tito Condemayta Hurtado de Mendoza (1729 – 18 May 1781) was a leading force in the indigenous uprising against the Spanish colonial rulers under Túpac Amaru II in the 18th century in Peru. She was cacica of her people in the 1770s, the most powerful such ruler in her region. During the uprising, she served as both a strategist and a military officer. She was executed for her role in the rebellion alongside Túpac Amaru II, his wife Micaela Bastidas Puyucahua, and their son Hipólito Condorcanqui Bastidas.

== Personal life ==
Tomasa Tito Condemayta was born in 1729 to an Inca noble family in an area of Peru that is now the Acomayo Province in the Cusco Region. Her parents were Sebastián Tito Condemayta, kuraka of the Tito Condemayta ayllu and godfather of Túpac Amaru II, and Alfonsa Hurtado de Mendoza. Sources give contradictory information as to her domestic life. In a 2005 work, scholar David Garrett stated that she was married to Tomas Escalante and bore him a daughter, who wed the cacique of Papres, Evaristo Delgado. In a 2008 article, Garrett stated that she was married to Faustino Delgado.

Unusually for the area, the Tito Condemayta ayllu embraced a lengthy hereditary rule, and Tito Condemayta became cacica of her people after her father, standing as the most powerful in the area.

== Rebellion ==
When Túpac Amaru II and his wife Micaela Bastidas Puyucahua called for a rebellion against Spanish rule in Peru in 1780, Condemayta left her husband and children to join the rebels in Tinta. Her embrace of the rebellion was not universal within her family, as her son-in-law, Evaristo Delgado, remained loyal to the Spanish throne.

Condemayta played an important role in the rebellion. Together with Amaru, she mobilized indigenous women for the uprising. She was a military strategist as well as an officer leading her own women's battalion. A wealthy woman, she also helped fund the rebellion, supplying silver and essential supplies. In the battle of Sangarara, a women's army under Condemayta's command defeated a Spanish army. She also led the successful defense of the bridge Pillpintuchaka on the Apurimac against approaching Spaniards. Thousands of women fought using slingshots and arrows against armored Spanish soldiers. Under her command, her troops held the Pilpinto pass for over a month. In 1781, fortunes turned to the much better-armed Spaniards, and on April 7, Condemayta was captured, along with Túpac Amaru II and Bastidas Puyucahua and their sons Hipólito and Fernando.

On May 18, 1781, Condemayta was executed after severe torture together with Túpac Amaru II and Micaela Bastidas Puyucahua and their son Hipólito Condorcanqui Bastidas in the main square of Cusco. She was the only native noble executed alongside the rebel leader. After being asphyxiated slowly with a hand-cranked metal garrote especially constructed for the occasion, she was hanged to ensure she was truly dead. Her impaled head was set up as a deterrent in Acos.
