= Battle of Sangarará =

1780 battle

Coordinates: 13.95°S 71.6°W

- Part of the Rebellion of Túpac Amaru II
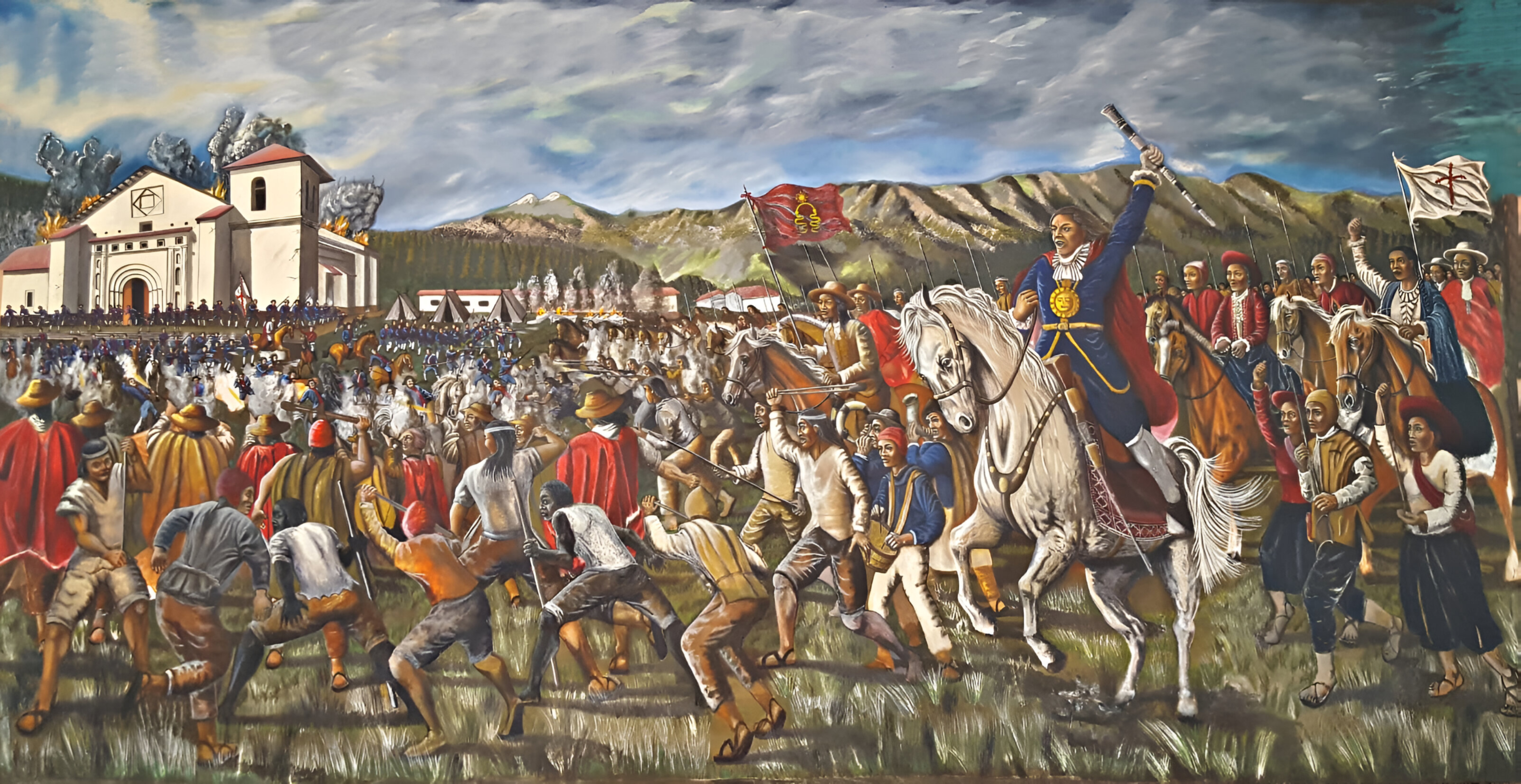
Date	November 18, 1780
Location	Sangarará, Viceroyalty of Peru
Result	Rebel victory; Start of the Rebellion of Túpac Amaru II

Belligerents
Spanish colonial forces	Aymara-Quechua rebels

Commanders and leaders
Tiburcio Landa †; Fernando Cabrera †; Pedro Sahuaraura †	Túpac Amaru II

Strength
1,500 royalist militia 800 indigenous	6,000 rebels

Casualties and losses
395–576 killed 28 wounded 1,700 displaced	20 killed or wounded

The Battle of Sangarará was fought on November 18, 1780 in Sangarará, Viceroyalty of Peru, between rebel forces under Túpac Amaru II and Spanish colonial forces under Tiburcio Landa. Túpac Amaru II's forces decsively defeated the hastely formed Spanish militia sent from Cusco. The battle was the first of the rebellion, and was the largest rebel victory of the war.

== Background ==
Prior to the execution of the corregidor of Tinta, Antonio de Arriaga, Túpac Amaru II traveled to his residence, and took 75 rifles, 2 grinders, some shotguns, a box of gunpowder, bullets and cartridges, the uniforms of a company of militias, mules, 22,000 pesos from tributes, 5 large silver pineapples, and many pounds of gold. In addition, he wrote messages on behalf of Arriaga to mayors and powerful individuals, requesting them to meet in Tungasuca. In this way, numerous military figures and businessmen were captured, such as the Spaniards Juan Antonio de Figueroa and Bernardo de la Madrid. During and after Arriaga's execution, many indigenous people followed Túpac Amaru after his many proclamations abolishing the Spanish mit'a, alcabala, slavery and mistreatment of the natives. He also sought to recruit kuraka's in the south by ordering them to arrest their respective corregidores; but those such as Diego Choquehuanca and Bernandino Sucaragua, disobeyed his orders and joined the royalists.

Following the capture of Quiquijana, which had been abandoned by its corregidor, on November 12, 1780, meetings were held in Cuzco to establish a war council. The Spanish had no troops in any of the towns between Cusco and Arequipa, and the local militias, if they existed, had no weapons or esprit de corps, so they collapsed before continuing the fight. Forces consisting of about 2,000 total soldiers from surrounding areas were combined with volunteers and militia from Cuzco and were organized under Tiburcio Landa. They arrived in Sangarará on the night of November 17 and based themselves in the town's church. The expectation of the arrival of a snowstorm may have influenced the Spanish decision to fortify the church in addition to strategic reasons.

== Battle ==
In the morning hours of November 18, the rebel forces occupied nearby hills and surrounded the church. Historical accounts outline Túpac Amaru II's request that creoles, women, and children be allowed to leave the church before the attack. The day before, Tiburcio Landa, Fernando Cabrera and Pedro Sahuaraura argued whether or not to set up camp by the church or in an open area by the town. The three also argued over who was leading the militia, which led to poor communication and cooperation amongst the corregidores.

The rebels began attacking the Spanish with slingshots and light rifle fire. The royalist militia took positions from inside the church. The church caught fire, either through arson by Túpac Amaru II or through the sudden spark of Spanish gunpowder. Landa ordered that no soldier leave the church. Regardless, many fled, and the area was surrounded by Túpac Amaru's army, and Tomasa Tito Condemayta women's garrison. Spanish troops had brought cannons with them, but they were rendered ineffective by the walls of the church. The battle ended at noon, after 6 hours of exhausting fighting, and the victory of Túpac Amaru was sealed. Historical casualty estimates for the Spanish ranged from 300 to 576. Estimates for rebel casualties number only 15 killed and 30 wounded.

== Aftermath ==
Túpac Amaru II's decisive victory helped to boost his support among Indians and gained him Spanish arms. It also helped to create fear among the Spanish in the area, although Spanish colonial officials used the violent nature of the battle in propaganda against the rebels. The Bishop of Cuzco excommunicated Túpac Amaru II from the church for the destruction of the church in Sangarará. The violent, anti-religious portrayals of the rebel leadership helped to limit support from Creoles and Mestizos. Following the battle, the rebels solidified their hold on the outside areas instead of attacking Cuzco, going against the advice of fellow commander (and Túpac Amaru II's wife) Micaela Bastidas.
