= Diego Cristóbal Túpac Amaru =

Don Diego Cristóbal Túpac Amaru
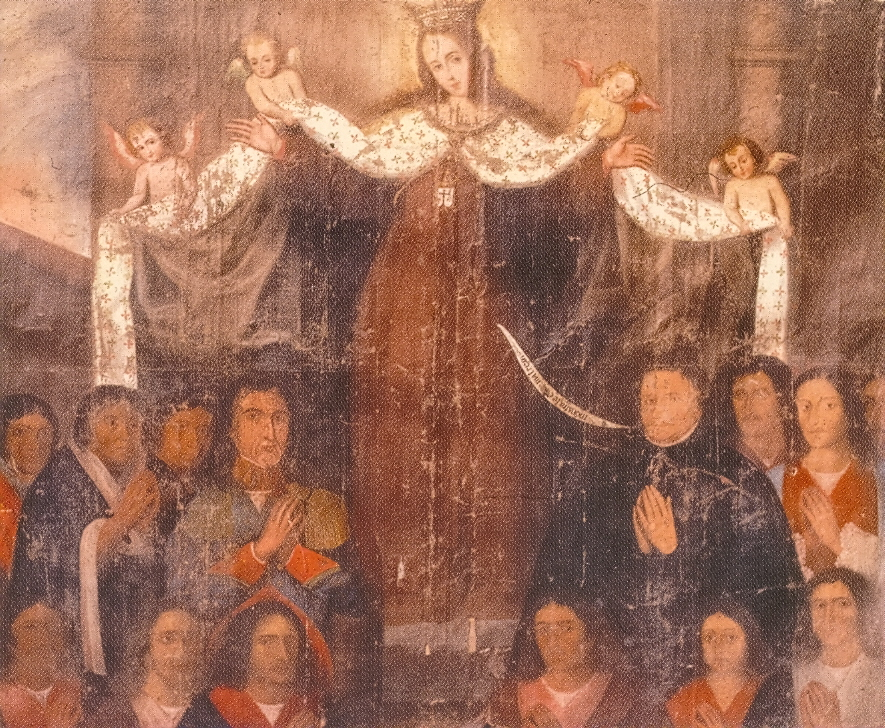
- Reign: c. 1750 – 19 July 1783
- Born: Diego Cristóbal Condorcanqui Castro; 1750; Tinta, Viceroyalty of Peru
- Died: July 19, 1784 (aged 33–34); Cuzco, Viceroyalty of Peru
- Spouse: Manuela Tito Condori Torres
- Issue: Juan Diego Tupac Amaru Condori
- Military service
- Allegiance: Inca Empire
- Branch: Túpac Amaru II's neo-Inca army
- Service years: 1780–1782
- Rank: Leader
- Commands: Unnamed battalion
- Conflicts: Rebellion of Túpac Amaru II: Siege of Paucartambo; Siege of Cusco; Battle of Layo; Battle of Puno; Siege of Sorata

Diego Cristóbal Condorcanqui Castro or Diego Cristóbal Túpac Amaru (1750 – 19 July 1783), was a Peruvian rebel leader, cousin of the hero Túpac Amaru II, whom he succeeded in the rebel command after his execution in the Rebellion of Túpac Amaru II.

== Rebellion ==
=== First phase ===
Upon assuming command, he had fought in the Urubamba campaigns against the royalist forces, in the attacks on Paucartambo, a city he besieged for an extended period, and in the war against Mateo Pumacahua, a royalist cacique. He also attempted an offensive at the Battle of Layo (April 14, 1781) to rescue his cousin, but the latter had already been sent to Cusco, and his attack failed. He then marched with his forces to the Altiplano to reorganize the rebellion and intensify operations in Upper Peru, although he did not always enjoy the necessary obedience from the lesser caciques and other local leaders.

=== Second phase ===
During the Upper Peru campaign, he devastated many towns, leaving only Puno standing, a city he besieged and attacked with his best troops. However, his greatest military success was the defeat of Marshal José del Valle who advanced from Tinta to liberate Puno and La Paz. Although he achieved victories at Puquinacancari and Condorcuyo, his army was destroyed by Diego Cristóbal's guerrillas and returned defeated to Cusco with the survivors from Puno. Meanwhile, on May 30, 1781, the rebels triumphantly entered the highland city. Another important victory was the capture of Sorata.

At the height of his power, he controlled vast areas of Cusco and had his people stationed just a few leagues city. He also dominated all of Puno and the highlands of Moquegua and Tacna. Through Túpac Katari, Andrés Túpac Amaru, and other lieutenants, he controlled the entirety of Andean Bolivia and parts of Chile and Argentina.

== Pardon and execution ==
Growing further opposed to his subordinates' inclination towards massacring every white settler, he sought a peace agreement with the royalists who had offered a general pardon. Believing in the sincerity of these offers, he surrendered almost his entire force after negotiating peace in Lampa. Nevertheless, he retained considerable political power, which the royalists later used as a pretext to implicate him in the Carabaya conspiracy and thus take him prisoner.

Captured along with his entire family on March 15, 1783, in Marcapata, he was subjected to a summary trial that ended with a death sentence by torture, his flesh being torn off with red-hot pincers, and was subsequently hanged and quartered on July 19 of the same year. His wife, his mother, and the conspirators of Carabaya were also executed, while the rest of his family was exiled to Spain, almost all of whom died from the cruel treatment and lack of food and medical attention during the voyage.

== See also ==
- Rebellion of Túpac Amaru II
- Túpac Amaru II
- Túpac Katari
