= Micaela Bastidas =

Leader of a large Andean uprising against the Spanish in Peru (1744–1781)

- Micaela Bastidas Puyucahua
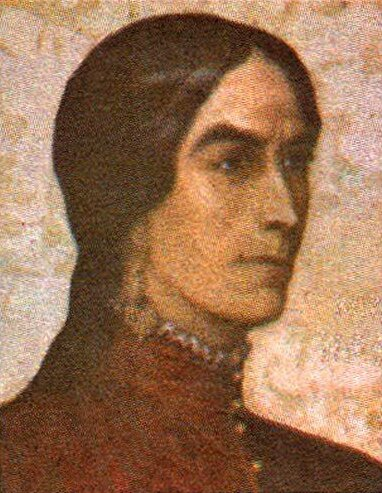
- Born: 23 June 1744; Pampamarca, Province of Cusco, Viceroyalty of Peru
- Died: 18 May 1781 (aged 36); Plaza de Armas, Cusco, Viceroyalty of Peru
- Cause of death: Execution via hanging and aggravated battery
- Spouse: Túpac Amaru II (m. 1760)
- Children: 3
- Military career
- Conflicts: Rebellion of Túpac Amaru II

Micaela Bastidas Puyucahua (23 June 1744 – 18 May 1781) was a pioneering indigenous leader against Spanish rule in South America, and a martyr for Peruvian independence. With her husband Túpac Amaru II, she led a rebellion against the Spanish and like him, was executed by the Spanish when the revolt failed. She was a full partner in her husband's enterprises before the revolt, and was described as "an exceptionally able leader of the rebellion."

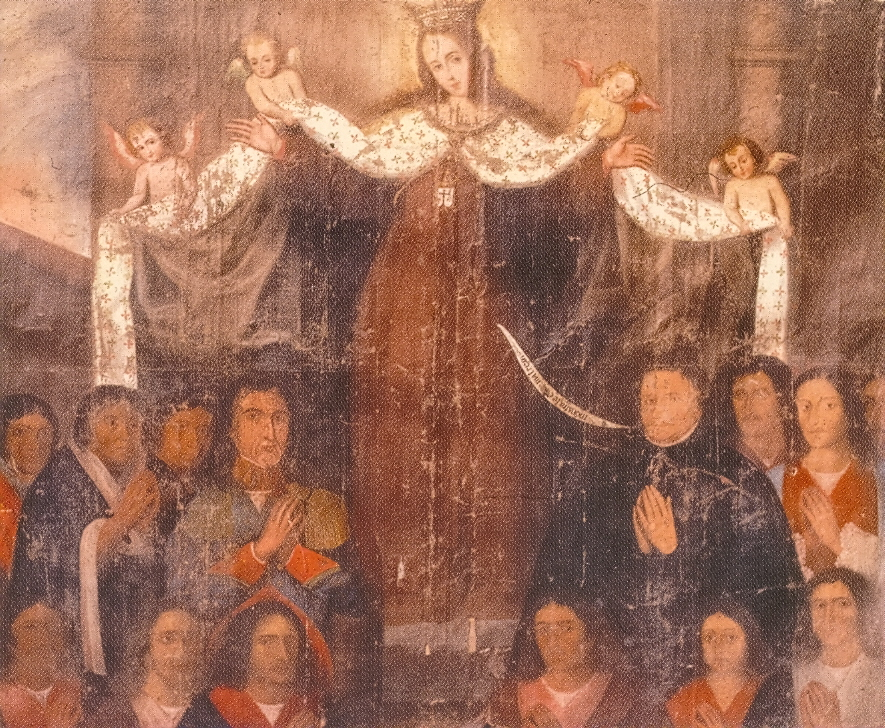
Virgen del Carmen with donors, also known as Túpac Amaru II and family.

== Biography ==
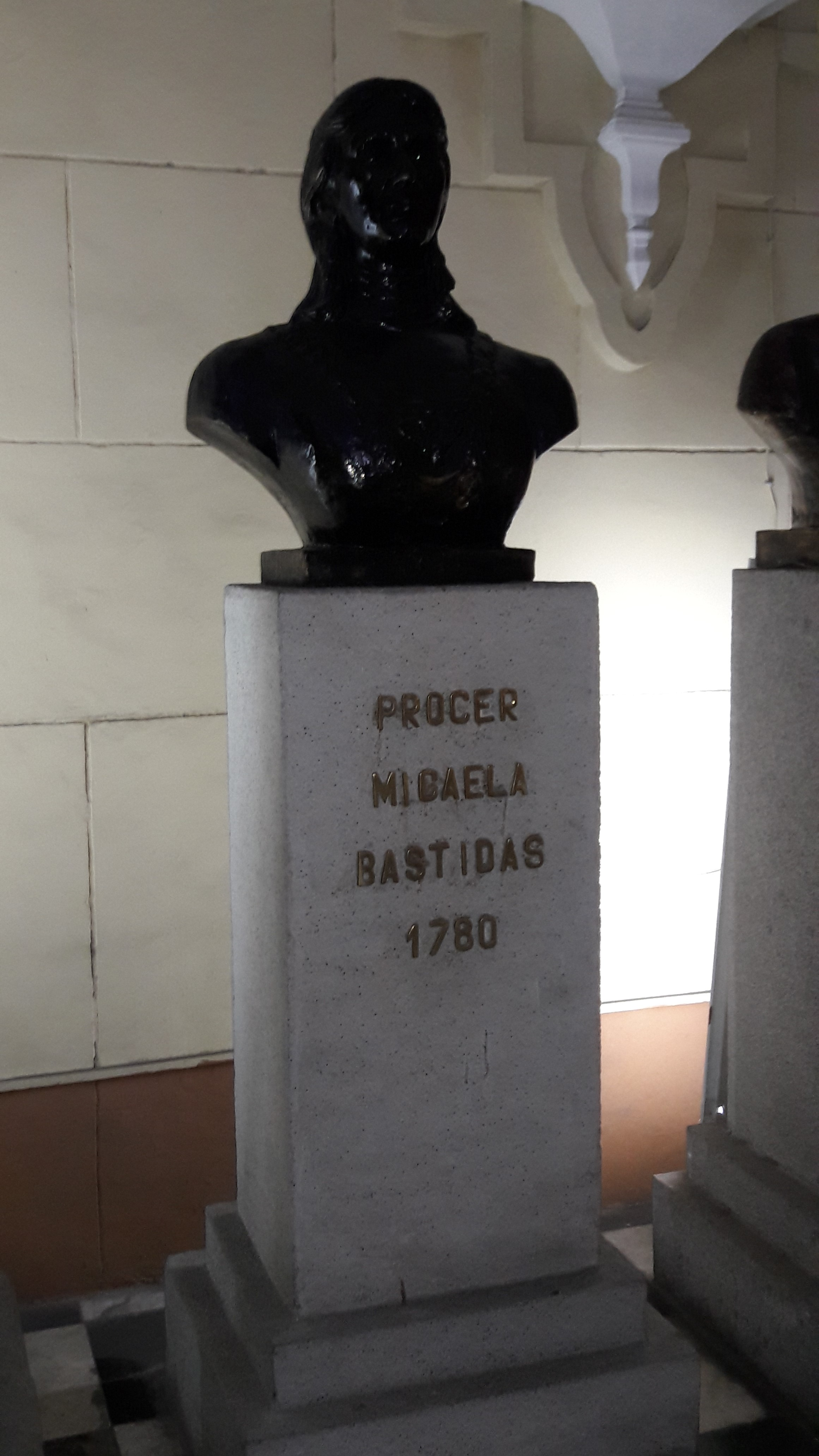
Effigy of Micaela Bastidas in the Panteón de los Próceres in Lima

She was born in 23 June 1744, daughter of Josefa Puyucahua and Manuel Bastidas. The documentation on the life of Micaela Bastidas is not ample in comparison to that of her husband, but the historical record documents her birth, marriage, and death. Micaela was born in Pampamarca province of Canas (laqaymarca annexed iromocco community of Pabellones, of the district of Pampamarca, of the province of Canas in 1744). She was the natural daughter of Manuel Bastidas (d. 1746) (perhaps of African descent or a priest) and Josefa Puyucahua Sisa. Given her status as an illegitimate child perhaps either of a priest or a Black man, she was marginalized in the overwhelmingly indigenous Andean highlands. Micaela spoke Quechua better than Spanish. She was a devout Catholic, but had little formal schooling. An account describes her as being "a beautiful Indian girl." It is unclear whether she was of African descent, since virtually nothing is known about her father, but some documents refer to her as a Zamba, a name given during the colonial-era racial hierarchy for those of mixed race, African and indigenous. Her marriage certificate listed her parents as both being "Spaniards" (españoles), but there was considerable fluidity in the system of racial classification, and such a designation may have been a "sign of respectability."

On May 25, 1760, before her sixteenth birthday, Micaela married José Gabriel Condorcanqui, who later used the name Túpac Amaru II, in the church of Our Lady of Purification in the city of Surimana. José Gabriel was a young mixed-race descendant of an important figure in Peruvian history, of the Inca Túpac Amaru I, executed by the Spanish in 1572. In 1764, he was named the cacique or kuraka of the territories corresponding with his legacy: Pampamarca, Tungasuca, and Surimana. The title and perquisites of power were hereditary. He fixed his residency with Micaela in Tinta, a region of Cusco. The couple produced three sons, Hipólito (1761), Mariano (1762), and Fernando (1768), baptized by the same priest that married them.

José Gabriel had received a privileged education in the school of Jesuits in Lima and Cusco at a school for the sons of indigenous lords. He spoke and wrote Spanish, spoke Quechua, and knew some Latin from his Jesuit education. He was the owner of large extensions of land and riches, having many roles of administration of their property. As a chief, he would mediate between the chief magistrate and indigenous people and their crime charges. As he prospered, he saw how the rest of the population was affected due to the physical revolts and creation of internal customs. As a regional trader over an extensive network, with 350 mules to carry trade-goods, he was in an excellent position to forge relationships with those he traded with and gather information about local conditions and concerns. As a person of mixed roots, he felt that he touched all of the injustices to his people firsthand. He came up with strategies and official applications to the authorities of Tinta Cusco and Lima so that indigenous people were freed from obligatory work in the mines and exonerated from compliance with forced labor. He usually met with negativity and indifference, but began to develop a libertarian ideology based on the defense of indigenous people, slaves, creoles, and people of mixed races, while guiding the independence of the territory and commerce from the decisions of the crown of Spain.

The marriage was a happy one and a full partnership. An important series of letters in Spanish exchanged between them during the early period of the rebellion include endearments and pet names for each other, as well as concerns about the other's safety.

After that she was captured in a failed uprising. She had joined her spouse in leading the rebellion, leading indigenous men and women in a battle for independence as well as organizing supplies and recruiting forces. She was known as being a "superior strategist to Tupac Amaru II, and certainly more daring." In a joint attack against the Spaniards, she encouraged Amaru to march on Cuzco quickly in order to surprise them and take advantage of their weakened city guard. However, Amaru held off which allowed the Spaniards to bring in reinforcements and capture Bastidas, Amaru, and many of their soldiers.

In 1780, the channels of dialogue with the representatives of the Spanish crown were exhausted, José Gabriel Condorcanqui started a movement against Spanish domination. It was supported by curacas linked to landowners from Cusco who were united against the new customs, Creoles, Indians and mestizos. At that time, he chose the name of Túpac Amaru II for himself, in honor of his ancestor the last Neo-Inca State.

On November 4, 1780 Túpac Amaru II presented the first cry for freedom and issued an independence proclamation. This was the beginning of the rebellion of Túpac Amaru II. The local commander of Spanish rule, Antonio de Arriaga, was taken prisoner and was later hanged. The rebels established their headquarters in Tungasuca.

The indigenous people were prohibited from possessing firearms, therefore one of the biggest problems they faced was obtaining weapons. Micaela was in charge of supplying the troops, which included obtaining and distributing money, food, clothing and weapons. She issued the safe-conducts to facilitate the movement of those who traveled through wide territories. She was in charge of the indigenous rearguard, demonstrating diligence and ability, implementing security measures and fighting espionage. She implemented an efficient communications system, organizing a chasquis service on horseback that quickly carried information from one point to another in the rebel territory.

A true legion of Andean fighters, [Quechuas] and Aymara worked together with Micaela in the uprising, carried out strategies and gave support to the troops. Her goal was not only to let free her people from Spanish exploitation, but also to reestablish the role of indigenous women with their participation in social life and politics, a tradition that the colonial system tried to abolish by making them victims of all kinds of abuses. There were women leaders within the movement Cecilia Túpac Amaru and Tomasa Tito Condemayta, chief of Acos, and many others.

These women also participated in the battle, along with their children and husbands. So did Micaela, who with her energetic character gave Túpac Amaru encouragement from the same battlefield. After the triumph of Sangarará, she was constituted as acting chief of the rebellion.

On November 18, 1780, the rebel army defeated the Spanish in the battle of Sangarará. Túpac Amaru sent a message to the peoples of Peru, calling on the Creoles to join the Indian cause: “Creoles, mestizos, zambos and Indians because we are all compatriots, as we were born in these lands and are of the same origin”.

In March 1781 the army of Túpac Amaru had seven thousand men and women willing to fight to the death against the Spanish crown, who proclaimed Túpac Amaru II as Emperor of America.In testimonies of the time it is Micaela appeared as the main strategist through political tasks, military and administrative and main advisor to the leader. With her solid principles, clarity of thought and high intuition, became the sixth sense of rebellion.

She was executed by the Spanish very painfully on May 18, 1781, at 36 years of age. The Spanish attempted to use a hand-cranked garrote on her that had been designed for the occasion and first used on fellow rebel Tomasa Tito Condemayta, but because her neck was so slender she was instead strangled with a rope. Her son Hipólito was also executed by the Spanish, both of them in front of Túpac Amaru II, who himself was then quartered and beheaded by the Spanish.

In 1976 the Peruvian government declared the law N° 21705, which exposes the importance of historical importance the celebration of the Bicentennial of the Emancipatory Rebellion of Túpac Amaru and Micaela Bastidas.

== Legacy ==
In the Andes, women were increasingly frequently involved in leading uprisings, particularly in the late eighteenth century. Several women became supporters of the camp in the rebel forces, but other women "functioned as soldiers and even military commanders." Micaela Bastidas Puyucahua, was a commander; she was called by the local rulers Señora Gobernadora, La Coya, or La Reina. Using these names reveals an indigenous parallel-gender pondering in its late imperialism expression.

Her role in the revolt was important since women were usually seen as weak. "The female involvement shocked the Spanish authorities because they were unable to bring up the customary gendered legal argument, which focused on the fragility and lack of education of women. The leading ladies of these uprisings were considered as overly assertive, even masculine, and as a result, they suffered the same severe penalties as the men. In numerous instances, colonial officials even publicly assassinated the women, displaying their heads and limbs."

Micaela Bastidas fought against gender standards established by colonialism as a wife, a woman, and a member of an indigenous people who had been subjugated. The rigid bipolarity of the Spanish gender system treated her as a 'hypermasculine' individual and a gender transgressor in an effort to deal with her as a female subject with agency, despite the fact as a woman, she was not supposed to have any subjectivity or control. Consequently, she received an unavoidable punishment, given to her as she was a male criminal who dared to oppose colonial forces.

== Execution ==
On May 18, 1781, they were taken to the Plaza de Armas in Cuzco to be executed. Her son Hipólito first had his tongue cut out, for having spoken against the Spanish, and then he was hanged. Micaela fought against her executioners, until they finally subdued her and cut off her tongue. She was strangled, then beaten with a club and finally killed with kicks in the stomach and breasts.

Túpac Amaru was then also killed. Both were dismembered and their body parts sent to different towns in the region to be exhibited in public squares as a warning of the consequences of rebelling.

== See also ==
- Bartolina Sisa
- India Juliana
- Rebellion of Túpac Amaru II
- Viceroyalty of Peru
- Tupac Amaru II
