= Urcos =

- Town
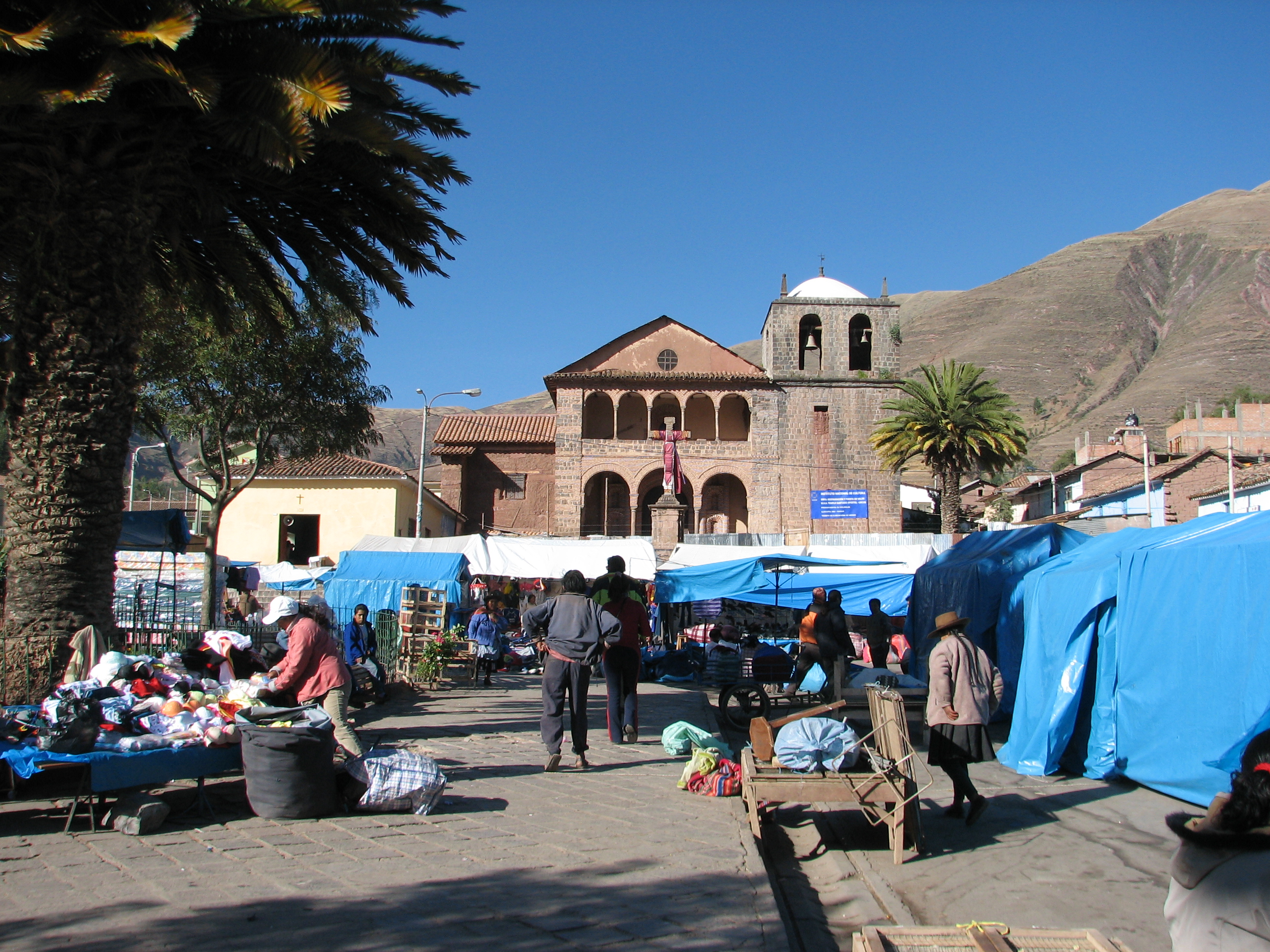
- Plaza and market

- Location within Peru
- Coordinates: 13°41′10″S 71°37′22″W
- Country: Peru
- Region: Cusco
- Province: Quispicanchi
- District: Urcos

Government
  - Mayor: Manuel Jesús Sutta Pfocco

Area
  - Total: 134.65 km^{2} (51.99 sq mi)
- Elevation: 3,150 m (10,330 ft)

Population (2017)
  - Total: 10,614
  - Density: 78.827/km^{2} (204.16/sq mi)
- Time zone: UTC-5 (PET)

Urcos is a small town in eastern Peru, capital of the province Quispicanchi in the region Cusco. It is home to a small lake and ruins.

Some time in the 15th century, it is said that Hatun Tupaq Inca received visions of the Incan creator deity Viracocha in Urcos, and then took the name Viracocha Inca that he held for the rest of his reign.
