= Tinta, Peru =

Town in Canchis, Peru

Tinta
- Locality
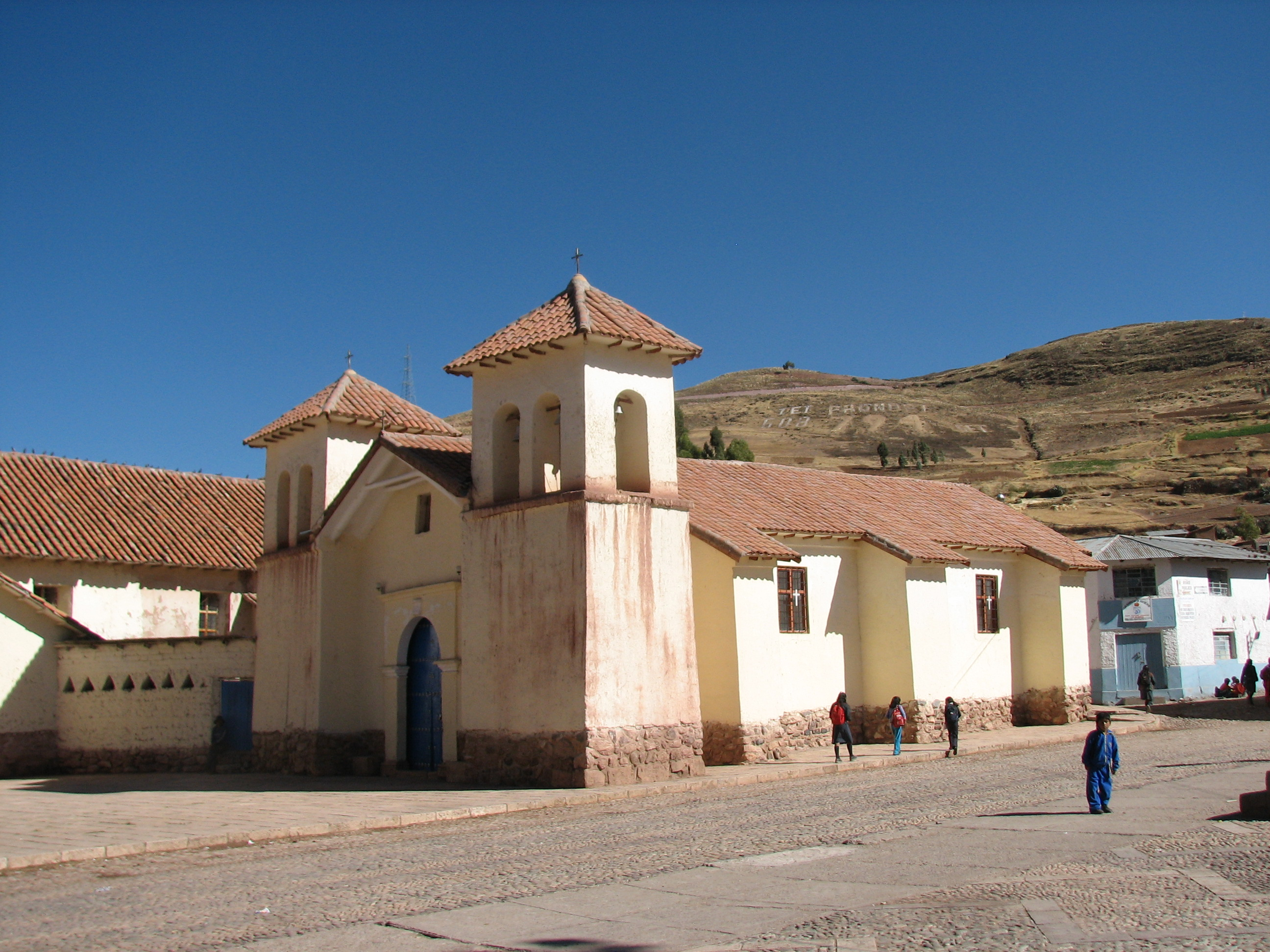
- St. Bartholomew's Church within the town

- Location within Peru
- Coordinates: 14°08′40″S 71°24′20″W
- Country: Peru
- Department: Cuzco
- Province: Canchis
- District: Tinta
- Elevation: 3,836 m (12,585 ft)

Population (2017)
  - Total: 2,910
- Time zone: UTC-5 (PET)

Tinta is the capital town of Tinta District, Canchis Province, Department of Cuzco, Peru. It is located at an altitude of 3,836 meters above the sea level. As of the year 2017, it had a total population of 2,910.

The town was the base of the Rebellion of Túpac Amaru II, an uprising by kuraka-led Aymara, Quechua, and mestizo rebels aimed at overthrowing Spanish colonial rule in Peru, from 1780 to 1783.

== Climate ==
Tinta has a Tundra Climate (ET) under the Köppen Climate Classification. It sees the most precipitation in January, with an average rainfall of 239 mm; and the least precipitation in July, with an average rainfall of 15 mm.

Climate data for Tinta
Month	Jan	Feb	Mar	Apr	May	Jun	Jul	Aug	Sep	Oct	Nov	Dec	Year
Mean daily maximum °C (°F)	12.8 (55.0)	12.7 (54.9)	12.9 (55.2)	12.7 (54.9)	12.4 (54.3)	12.3 (54.1)	12.2 (54.0)	13.4 (56.1)	14.0 (57.2)	14.1 (57.4)	14.1 (57.4)	13.3 (55.9)	13.1 (55.5)
Daily mean °C (°F)	8.0 (46.4)	8.0 (46.4)	8.0 (46.4)	7.5 (45.5)	6.8 (44.2)	6.0 (42.8)	5.6 (42.1)	6.4 (43.5)	7.5 (45.5)	8.2 (46.8)	8.6 (47.5)	8.3 (46.9)	7.4 (45.3)
Mean daily minimum °C (°F)	4.3 (39.7)	4.3 (39.7)	4.0 (39.2)	2.8 (37.0)	1.2 (34.2)	0.1 (32.2)	−0.6 (30.9)	−0.1 (31.8)	1.5 (34.7)	3.1 (37.6)	3.8 (38.8)	4.3 (39.7)	2.4 (36.3)
Average rainfall mm (inches)	239 (9.4)	221 (8.7)	195 (7.7)	95 (3.7)	34 (1.3)	16 (0.6)	15 (0.6)	26 (1.0)	55 (2.2)	112 (4.4)	140 (5.5)	196 (7.7)	1,344 (52.8)
Source: Climate-Data.org

== See also ==
- Canchis Province
