= Center for Traditional Textiles of Cusco =

Nonprofit organisation

The Center for Traditional Textiles of Cusco (Spanish: Centro de Textiles Tradicionales del Cuzco) was founded by indigenous weavers from the community of Chinchero as well as international supporters in 1996 as a non-profit organization. It is based out of the city of Cusco, Peru where its main offices, museum and shop are located. The CTTC works in support of indigenous weavers from the Cusco region to recover traditional Cusqueñan textiles. The organization currently partners with ten communities from the Cusco region: Accha Alta, Acopia, Chahuaytire, Chinchero, Huacatinco, Mahuaypampa, Patabamba, Pitumarca, Santa Cruz de Sallac, and Santo Tomas (Chumbivilcas).

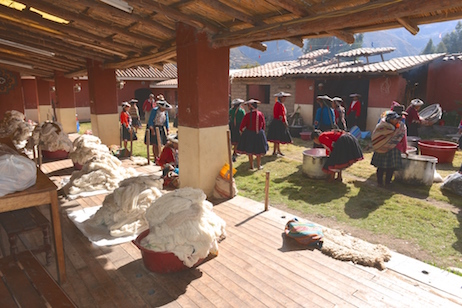
Dye workshop in Pitumarca held by the Centro de Textiles Tradicionales del Cusco.

== Mission and vision ==
The CTTC's mission is to "promote the empowerment of weavers through the sustainable practice of Peruvian ancestral textile traditions in the Cusco region. This enables the weavers to maintain their identity and textile traditions while improving their quality of life through workshops, opportunities, and the promotion of their textile art." The CTTC's aim is to revive Pre-Columbian textile traditions and provide support to weaving communities.

Due to racism, colonialism, poverty, and more, textile traditions in the Cusco region were in danger of disappearing during the 20th century. In the Andes, textiles are an important part of everyday life and a key component of local culture. This ancient way of life, passed down for thousands of years from generation to generation, has been at risk since the days of the Conquest. Traditional textiles were such a strong symbol of indigenous identity and resistance to colonial rule, that the Spanish outlawed their creation and use. Despite this, the people of the Andes continued practicing their textile traditions until the 20th century. Under pressure from changes brought about by globalization, including the introduction of chemical dyes and fibers, traditional textiles experienced a dramatic decline in the 1900s.

Since 1996, the CTTC has worked to empower weavers and achieve its vision "To place the weaver of ancestral textiles as a recognized global artist, forging a just recognition by society and assuring the continuity of the ancestral textile practice."

== History ==
Since the 1960s, an informal group of women weavers from the community of Chinchero gathered together to revive textile traditions and earn an independent income from male relatives through the sale of their textiles in the tourist market. When the husband and wife pair of ethnobotnists Christine and Ed Franquemont arrived in Chinchero in the 1970s to conduct research, they encouraged the weavers to continue their community organizing work. With the support of the Franquemonts and other international friends, the group of weavers founded a cultural center in Chinchero. When this cultural center failed, the weavers re-organized under the leadership of Nilda Callañaupa Alvarez to found the Centro de Textiles Tradicionales del Cusco (CTTC).

The CTTC was founded in 1996 as a non-profit organization registered with APCI in Peru by weavers from Chinchero and their international supporters. Key founders of the CTTC include: Nilda Callañaupa Alvarez, Elizabeth and David Van Buskirk, Maria Tocco, Christine and Ed Franquemont, Yolanda Jaime Callañaupa, Yenny Callañaupa, Flora Callañaupa de Hendrickson, Betty Doerr, and Tim Wells, amongst many others. The CTTC originally partner with a handful of communities in the Cusco region to revive textile traditions, including the communities of Accha Alta, Chahuaytire, Chinchero and Pitumarca. Nilda Callañaupa Alvarez has served as director of CTTC since 1996. The board of directors includes: Nilda Callañaupa Alvarez, Flora Callañaupa de Hendrickson, Yolanda Jaime Callañaupa, Hilda Roque Perez, Miriam Luna, and Betty Doerr.

Until 2001 the CTTC was run out of the basement of the home of Nilda Callañaupa Alvarez. After an extensive capital campaign, the CTTC purchased and remodeled a building on Av. Sol 603, Cusco, Perú to house its offices, museum, and store.

In 2010 the CTTC held Tinkuy 2010: Gathering of Weavers, an international conference that gathered together indigenous weavers, textile artists, art historians, anthropologists and others to discuss and share textile traditions from around th world. In 2013, CTTC organized the second Tinkuy titled Tinkuy 2013: Gathering of Weavers.

== The weaving associations ==
The CTTC has partnered with ten communities from the Cusco region: Accha Alta, Acopia, Chahuaytire, Chinchero, Huacatinco, Mahuaypampa, Patabamba, Pitumarca, Santa Cruz de Sallac, and Santo Tomas (Chumbivilcas). In each community the weavers have formed autonomous weaving associations, each registered with the Peruvian government. Each weaving association is self-governed through elected officials (President, Vice-President, Secretary, Treasurer), who are elected once a year. Each weaving association determines its own rules and regulates member participation.

In each community the CTTC has built a weaving center for the associations where the weavers can gather to meet and work. The weaving centers are composed of a central grassy courtyard for weaving in good weather while the surrounding complex of buildings are used for weaving in poor weather conditions, meetings, and include space for storage and a kitchen. Each association gathers once a week in their weaving center to work and organize.

=== Accha Alta ===
Association: "Centro de Tejedores Munay Pallay Awaqkuna de Accha Alta"

Community: Accha Alta

District: Calca

Province: Calca

Region: Cusco

Accha Alta is located approximately 2 hours northeast of the city of Cusco. Nestled on a steep mountain slope next to the ruins of Ankasmarka, an ancient Incan granary, this remote mountain community looks out over the valley below. Most people in Accha Alta only speak Quechua, the local indigenous language, and rely on their chakras (fields) to produce much of the food they need for their families. At 12,930 feet above sea level, very few crops grow in the thin mountain air except for potatoes and other tubers. Accha Alta is well known for its many potato varieties and people from as far away as Cusco come to buy Accha Alta potatoes.

The community of Accha Alta began working with the Centro de Textiles Tradicionales del Cusco in 1998. In the beginning almost all of the association members knew how to weave, but solely used synthetic fibers. Since 1998, the weavers have returned to using natural materials, which includes natural dyes in sheep, alpaca, and llama wool. Accha Alta weavers are very proud of their traditions, and place emphasis on the young weavers, ensuring that their traditions are carried on into the future. There are approximately 40 adult members in Accha Alta's weaving association and 35 children.

Accha Alta textiles are recognized for their thin sections of plain weave and wide designs in the ley (supplementary warp) technique. Traditional textiles from Accha Alta are white and red. Common designs include patterns of lakes, which are represented as diamonds, for example, wasqa qocha, or long lakes. Accha Alta textile artists manage a number of techniques, including: backstrap weaving in the ley technique, backstrap weaving in the doble cara technique, knitting (including the Qhurpus knitting technique), sling braiding, rope braiding, the tubular border weaving chichilla, and the crotcheted stitch known as kumpay used on the edges of textiles.

=== Acopia ===
Association: "Centro de Tejedores Cuatro Lagunas de Acopia"

Community: Acopia

District: Acopia

Province: Acomayo

Region: Cusco

Acopia is located about two hours south of the city of Cusco in an area known as the Four Lakes, or land of Valicha after a popular huayno (folk song). The four high mountain lakes provide sustenance to local people who rely on them for fishing and irrigation for their fields. Acopia is located on the banks of the third and smallest lake.

The weaving tradition in Acopia nearly disappeared completely as the younger generation did not continue in the footsteps of their elders. The CTTC began working with Acopia in 2006, helping the elders pass on their knowledge to younger generations. There are approximately 30 adult members in Acopia's weaving association and 20 children.

Traditional Acopia blankets are woven with many thin designs in the doble cara (two sided warp-faced) technique. A distinguishing design from the community is organo q’enqo, a zig-zag pattern.

=== Chahuaytire ===
Association: "Centro de Tejedores Inka Pallay de Chahuaytire"

Community: Chahuaytire

District: Pisac

Province: Calca

Region: Cusco

Chahuaytire is located in the mountains above the valley town of Pisaq approximately 25 miles north of the city of Cusco. There is an Incan trail that leads from the lowlands near Písac to the highlands of Chahuaytire that has been in use since pre-Columbian times. Chahuaytire weavers care for flocks of alpaca, llama and sheep higher in the mountains around their community. The CTTC began working with Chahuaytire in 1999. There are approximately 35 adult members in Chahauytire's weaving association and 40 children.

Chahuaytire weavers are well known locally for the high quality of their weavings. Their compact warp-faced weave, careful colour combinations, and detail to border finishes make Chahuaytire textiles some of the finest in the Cusco region. Chahuaytire weavers use both the doble cara (complementary warp) and ley (supplementary warp) techniques to create wide designs. Traditional textiles from Chahauytire are dark maroon and white. Designs are woven in dark marroon or purple on white backgrounds, while plain weave pampa sections are modulations of varying hues in dark purple. maroon and/or black. Chahuaytire weavers are experts in color combination, and modulate color tones in non-traditional textiles. A common design from Chahuaytire is tika qocha, lake with flowers, which often features on blankets and ponchos. Chahauytire blankets are characterized by their unique star, or rose, stitch which unites the two sides of the blanket.

=== Chinchero ===
Association: "Asociación de Tejedores Awayriqcharicheq de Chinchero"

Community: Chinchero

District: Chinchero

Province: Urubamba

Region: Cusco

Chinchero is known as the ‘birthplace of the rainbow’ and is located on a high plain 45 minutes outside the city of Cusco. The town of Chinchero is composed of smaller communities, including: Cuper Bajo, Cuper Alto, Huaypo, Yanacona, and others. Chinchero is located on the road between Cusco and Urubamba, which means that thousands of tourists pass through Chinchero en route from the airport in Cusco to the famed ruins of Machu Picchu beyond Urubamba. Many tourists stop in Chinchero to visit the ruins of the summer residence of Inca Tupac Yupanqui and to witness the town's weaving tradition. Since the CTTC began its work in the textile field, many other small textile centers have emerged in Chinchero and the town has become increasingly commercial.

The Chinchero weaving association was the founding association of CTTC in 1996. There are approximately 40 adult members in the Chinchero weaving association and 40 children. Since the 1960s until today, the Association "Asociación de Tejedores Awayriqcharicheq de Chinchero" (not to be confused with the many other textile centers in Chinchero that sprung up afterward), has succeeded in bringing weaving to the forefront of their community. The town of Chinchero is known internationally as a prominent Andean weaving community where efforts to revive traditions have also revitalized the town itself.

As Chinchero is located on a major tourist byway, the weavers of the Chinchero weaving association offer demonstrations to visiting tourists and run a small store in their weaving center.

=== Huacatinco ===
Association "Asociación de Tejedores Wiñay Awaqkuna de Huacatinco"

Community: Huacatinco

District: Ocongate

Province: Quispicanchis

Region: Cusco

Huacatinco is the latest community to partner with CTTC; it joined the non-profit in 2011. The community is located in the Ocongate district, approximately three hours south of the city of Cusco. While Huacatinco is rich in local culture and looks out over the snow-capped peaks of the Ausungate mountain range, it is one of the most impoverished areas of Peru. Some parts of the district have been abandoned by government services and local families are forced to be self-sufficient. Most rely on their chakra (fields) and flocks of alpaca and llama for survival. Local people mostly speak Quechua, and continue to wear their traditional clothing on a daily basis.

Before partnering with CTTC, weavers from the Huacatinco association found it difficult to sell their textiles. After traveling the three hours to the city of Cusco, they would search for buyers, often in vain. When a store or merchant was interested in their products, they offered extremely low prices for the detailed work. Rather than paying the weavers upfront, they would withhold payment for months, if they even paid the weavers at all. Some merchants would agree to buy the textiles, but would never follow through with their promise of future payment.

Today approximately 25 adult weavers and 20 children are members of the Huacatinco weaving association. The weavers are working to finish construction on their weaving center and to investigate their textile traditions with elders. Through the fair-trade sale of their textiles with CTTC, they are assured of a steady income for their families.

In Huacatinco both women and men knit elaborately patterned hats called chullo and weave fine textiles with the backstrap loom. Both men's and women's traditional clothing are elaborated with embroidery in white beads.

=== Mahuaypampa ===
Association: "Centro de Tejedores Virgen Inmaculada Concepción de Mahuaypampa"

Community: Mahuaypampa

District: Maras

Province: Urubamba

Region: Cusco

Mahuaypampa is located approximately 50 km to the northwest of the city of Cusco in the Maras district, just off the highway between Cusco and Urubamba. Situated on a high altiplano, the community dedicates itself to agriculture as it is well situated on a wide rolling plain.

The textile tradition in Mahuaypampa almost disappeared as few children were learning from their elders. The Mahuaypampa association partnered with the CTTC in 2000. Since then the community has worked to recover its weaving tradition. Today there are approximately 30 adult weavers and 12 children in the Mahuaypampa weaving association.

Traditional designs in Mahuaypampa are small and narrow. Because of this, weavers will typically place many designs next to each other in order to build up a wider design composition. The design mayu qenqo, said to represent the Milky Way, is one of the principal designs of Mahuaypampa. Blankets in Mahuaypampa are characterized by the enagua seam, which represents petticoats and is used to unite the two halves of the textile.

=== Patabamba ===
Association: "Centro de Tejedores Away Paccarichiq Pallay Tika de Patabamba"

Community: Patabamba

District: Coya

Province: Calca

Region: Cusco

Patabamba is located high in the mountains above the Sacred Valley overlooking the town of Pisac. There are many Incan ruins located around the community. A high mountain lake is located above Patabamba. Here locals pasture their flocks of sheep, alpaca and llama while also occasionally fishing for trout. Few traditional festivals are still celebrated in Patabamba. This decline in local culture is attributed to conflicts between the older Catholic tradition and new Evangelical tradition that prohibits the expression of older belief systems.

As just a handful of elders knew how to weave in Patabamba, the weaving tradition nearly disappeared. The Patabamba association partnered with the CTTC in 2001 and today approximately 40 adult weavers and 15 children are members. They continue to work to revive their weaving tradition.

Traditional lliklla (blankets) from Patabamba are woven with a wide sections of plain weave in red or green. Design sections are woven in the doble cara (complementary warp) technique. Often, weavers will sew a strip of blue or green fabric, often velvet, around the edge of their blankets. Over this border frame they will embroider figures in white thread, often images of fish, flowers, and birds. While this embellishment is decorative, it also serves to protect blanket edges from fraying with use.

=== Pitumarca ===
Association: "Asociación de Tejedores Munay Ticlla del Distrito de Pitumarca"

Community: Pitumarca

District: Pitumarca

Province: Canchis

Region: Cusco

Pitumarca is located approximately two hours south of the city of Cusco, off the main highway passing the town of Checacupe. Pitumarca is now a large town, and weavers from surrounding communities come down from the mountains to participate in the Pitumarca weaving association which partnered with CTTC in 1997. There are approximately 50 adult weavers and 25 children in the Pitumarca weaving association. The weavers of Pitumarca have maintained for thousands of years, from generation to generation, dozens of complex textile techniques that can be directly traced to specific pre-Columbian cultures. These include: ley (supplementary warp), doble cara, (complementary warp), amapolas (a weaving technique that allows for designs on both sides of the textiles in up to five colors), ticlla (discontinuous warp and weft), sling and rope braiding, knitting, and other techniques. Pitumarca textiles are some of the finest and most complex in the Cusco region, and the town's official slogan is the "Andean capital of textiles." Weavers of the Pitumarca association are incredibly proud of their hard work to investigate and revive techniques like ticlla, and wear their traditional clothing with honor and pride.

Pitumarca is known internationally for its revival of the ticlla (discontinuous warp and weft) technique. This complex technique allows a weaver to change the color of their warp thread by inserting sticks into their warp. The weaver warps one color between one set of warp sticks, and another color between the following set of warp sticks. The weaver then weaves the two sections together to create a unified whole. The ticlla technique can be traced as far back as the Chavin culture, and was especially important to the Paracas and Nazca who created stunning textiles solely with ticlla. The technique is unique to the pre-Columbian cultures of Peru, and cannot be found anywhere else in the world.

For decades modern scholars believed that ticlla was but another unique Andean technique that had been lost to time. After beginning investigative work with the Pitumarca association, elders revealed that they still knew how to weave ticlla. Since then elders have taught younger generations, and Pitumarca is now the only community in Peru that continues to weave with ticlla.

=== Santa Cruz de Sallac ===
Association: "Centro de Tejedores Watay de Santa Cruz de Sallac"

Community: Santa Cruz de Sallac

District: Urcos

Province: Quispicanchis

Region: Cusco

Santa Cruz de Sallac is located approximately two and a half hours to the south of the city of Cusco high in the mountains above the regional town of Urcos. Urcos is a market town where highways meet and merchants sell products from the Andes mountains as well as the Amazon jungle. Santa Cruz de Sallac is located on the opposite side of the valley from the highway that leads to Puerto Maldonado and the Amazon jungle.

There is a sense of community in Santa Cruz de Sallac and weavers focus on community organization and assisting each other. The weaving association is very well-organized. There are approximately 45 adult weavers and 20 children in the Santa Cruz de Sallac weaving association. The association partnered with the CTTC in 2005.

Weavers in the Santa Cruz de Sallac association are unique in the Cusco region for their use of embroidery to create their designs. While they also weave patterns in the ley (supplementary warp) technique, they predominately embroider geometric shapes over plain weave backgrounds. Santa Cruz de Sallac is also well known for its revival of the watay (ikat) technique. In this dyeing technique, the weaver will prepare a special warp, where he or she tightly wraps up certain sections. The weaver then dyes this warp. The unwrapped sections of warp thread are dyed, but dye cannot enter the tightly wrapped sections which remain undyed. After dyeing, the weaver unwraps the sections of wrapped warp. When the weaver mounts this warp on their loom and weaves it as plain weave, the dyed and undyed sections form a design. Besides the Ccatcca district, Santa Cruz de Sallac is one of the only communities in Peru that still maintains the watay technique which can be traced to dyeing techniques practiced by the Nazca and Huari cultures.

=== Santo Tomas (Chumbivilcas) ===
Association: "Asociación de Mujeres Artesanas 'Surphuy' de Chumbivilcas"

Community: Santo Tomas

District: Santo Tomas

Province: Chumbivilcas

Region: Cusco

Santo Tomas is the capital of the Chumbivilcas province and is located eight hours southwest from the city of Cusco. The Santo Tomas weaving center is located in the capital, but weavers from the surrounding province travel into the small city to participate. Santo Tomas is located on a high rolling plain and is known for its horseback riding tradition and cattle herds. As communities and homes are spread far apart over the rolling plains and hills, people traditionally rely on their horses for transportation. Many local festivals and traditions are based around horseback riding, and traditional clothing reflects this in the use of leather chaps, spurs, and other riding equipment.

The Santo Tomas weaving association partnered with CTTC in 2007. Today approximately 20 adults and 15 children are members of the Santo Tomas weaving association. Before working with the CTTC, members of this association used acrylic yarn and chemical dyes in their textiles. After an arduous process, the weavers now use natural dyes and natural sheep wool.

The textile tradition of Santo Tomas reflects their unique horseback riding tradition. Wide designs in the doble cara (complementary warp) technique often reflect horses or horses with riders. Women's traditional clothing is distinguished by bold reverse appliqué designs in black velvet over satin-like fabrics in bright reds, blues, and greens, making traditional dress from Santo Tomas highly distinct from other Cusco communities. Both women and men wear boots for horseback riding, while men wear elaborate leather leggings and spurs.

== Education department ==
The mission of the CTTC's Education Department is to "provide an interactive space between weavers and the public through programs, investigations, and publications that promote the revaluation of ancestral textiles." The vision of the Education Department is "To achieve a future where Peruvian textile culture is valued as a global patrimony." The Education Department at the CTTC runs educational events for the weavers, the young weavers and the general public, as well as managing the museum Weaving Lives, the permanent collection of textiles, the library on textile sources, the design catalogue, investigations and publications, classes for visitors, visual materials and the volunteer program.

=== The Young Weaver Groups ===
Each of the ten weaving associations works with a youth group called the Young Weaver Group. These are children and adolescents between the ages of six and thirty who are learning the textile traditions of their community. The CTTC places emphasis on the young weavers as they will be responsible for carrying on traditions in the future. The Young Weaver Groups began in Chinchero in the 1990s. Since then, each community has organized a youth group. Elder weavers work with the children to teach them designs and techniques. The Education Department organizes various activities for the young weavers each year, including: gatherings of young weavers, weaving competitions, classes on ancient textiles of Peru, field trips to local museums, and more.

=== Museum "Weaving Lives" ===
Located on Av Sol 603, Cusco, Perú, the museum Weaving Lives details the backstrap weaving process, unique Peruvian textile techniques, traditional uses of textiles in the Andes, as well as traditions and practices associated with textiles. Opened to the public in 2001, the small museum presents five rooms that display textiles, photography, and text in Spanish and English.

=== The CTTC Permanent Collection of Textiles ===
Since its founding in 1996, the CTTC has developed a unique ethnographic collection of traditional textiles from the Andes that include: examples of the traditional clothing from each of the ten communities, examples of the rudimentary textiles made before the CTTC's investigative work, exemplary textiles created after the CTTC's investigative work, pieces from the annual competition "Weaver Awards," amongst others. Pieces from the CTTC Permanent Collection of Textiles have been displayed in local and international exhibits.

=== CTTC Library ===
The CTTC maintains a small library of textile sources, used for investigative work with the weavers and visiting scholars. Much of the replication work completed by the weavers of the CTTC is conducted through reference to textual sources.

=== The CTTC Design Catalogue ===
Each community maintains a unique repertoire of designs that represent their history and culture. Since 1996, the CTTC has worked to create a reference catalogue for each community that documents every design as well as each design variation.

=== Investigations and Publications ===
Through extensive investigative work with the elders of each community, the CTTC works to recover ancient designs, techniques, and styles that were on the brink of being lost to time. The center has published a number of articles, books and DVDs based on its efforts, including:

- Weaving Lives: Traditional Textiles of Cusco, Preserving the Textile Tradition, published in 2005 by the Centro de Textiles Tradicionales del Cusco
- Weaving in the Peruvian Highlands: Dreaming Patterns, Weaving Memories, published in 2007 by Nilda Callañaupa Alvarez
- Textile Traditions of Chinchero: A Living Heritage, published in 2012 by Nilda Callañaupa Alvarez
- Faces of Tradition: Weaving Elders of the Andes, published in 2013 by Nilda Callañaupa Alvarez and Christine Franquemont

=== The Weaver Awards ===
Since 2006 CTTC has partnered with Culture Explorers to offer the 'Weaver Awards,' an annual weaving competition, to the ten weaving associations that partner with CTTC. The Weaver Awards inspire the weavers to unite their efforts to create exceptional pieces that are inducted into the CTTC's Permanent Collection of textiles or that are acquired by international collectors and museums. The Weaver Awards help provide additional income to impoverished communities while encouraging excellence in the textile arts.

=== Textile Classes ===
The CTTC offers four courses on traditional Andean textiles: spinning, backstrap weaving, knitting, and sling braiding. Each course is one to three days in length, except for the knitting course which is only offered for a full three days. The classes are private and teach the basic skills of spinning with a drop spindle, weaving on a backstrap loom, knitting in the Chinchero style, and braiding ropes and slings from Pitumarca. The CTTC's policy concerning the teaching of traditional techniques is a balance between educating the public and respecting the intellectual property rights of indigenous peoples. The CTTC offers up to three days of instruction in traditional techniques, as this time frame is enough for students to gain respect for the complex, millennia old techniques. The CTTC does not offer more than three days of class time, as this would risk compromising the intellectual property rights of the indigenous weavers it works with.

=== The CTTC Volunteer Program ===
The CTTC offers two volunteer positions, Education Department Volunteers and Project Volunteers. In the Education Department volunteers assist with various projects and events run for the weavers and the public. Project Volunteers work on unique projects in support of the CTTC.

== The sales and marketing department ==
The Sales & Marketing Department promotes the sale on a fair-trade basis of the weaver's textile art. The Sales & Marketing Department manages five physical store locations, as well as an online catalogue. The main CTTC store, which sells woven textiles, is located on Av Sol 603, Cusco, Peru. Directly next door to its main store, the CTTC runs a small knitwear store. Besides the main two stores on Av Sol, the Sales and Marketing Department runs a small museum shop in Museo Inka and another museum shop in Museo de Arte Precolombino, both located in the historic center of Cusco. The fifth CTTC store is located at the weaving complex in the community of Chinchero. The CTTC also exports to stores and companies located in the US and Canada.

The sale on a fair-trade basis of the weaver's work has been the main contributing factor in improving the quality of life of member weavers. With improved income, families are able to send their children to school, access better health care, and make improvements to their homes. Women have been provided with independent incomes from their male relatives, which has improved their standing in community life.

=== Products ===
The CTTC offers traditional textiles as well as modern products created in various techniques including: backstrap weaving, knitting, and rope braiding. Each piece is made with natural alpaca, sheep or llama fiber and dyed with natural plant and animal dyes. Each item is authored and includes a photo of the artist, their birthdate, and their community. Traditional textiles offered by the CTTC include: lliklla (blankets), ponchos, unkuna (a cloth to carry coca leaves), chumpi (belts), jakima (small ribbons), slings, and chullo (knitted hats), amongst others. Non-traditional products offered by the CTTC include: wall hangings and wall art, home decor, bags and purses, accessories, and modern clothing items, amongst others.

== Special Projects ==
Besides the Education Department and the Sales & Marketing Department, the CTTC runs a number of special projects that seek to revive textile traditions in the Cusco region.

=== Natural dyes ===
Since 1999, the CTTC has been the leader in the Cusco region in the revival of natural dyes. Weavers from the community of Chinchero, led by Nilda Callañaupa Alvarez, held investigations with elders, attended international workshops and conferences, and conducted many experiments before reviving the natural dyeing process in the Cusco region. The CTTC is recognized internationally as the main force in reviving natural dyeing in the Cusco region where today many weavers once more use ancient dyes once practiced by their ancestors. Natural dyes revived by the CTTC include:

- Anil (indigo) - Indigófera suffruticosa, familia Fabaceae - produces all shades of blue from light to dark
- Chaphi (Palo Palo) - Galium aparine, familia Rubiaceae - produces a light shade of pink or peach
- Checchi - Berberis carinata, familia Berberidaceae - produces shades of yellow
- Ch'illka - Baccharis caespitosa, familia Asteraceae - produces shades of green
- Cochineal - Dactylopius coccus, familia Dactylopiidae - produces shades of red, pinks, purples and oranges depending on what mordant is used in the dye vat
- Kiku - Bidens andicola, familia Asteraceae - produces shades of yellow
- Q'olle - Budleja coriaceae, familia Loganiaceae - produces shades of yellow and orange when mixed with cochineal
- Kinsa k'uchu - Baccharis genistelloides, familia Asteraceae - produces a light shade of turquoise. Note, it is a black fungus on the leaf Kinsa kuchu that produces the dye, not the leaf itself.
- Molle - Sichinus molle, familia Anacardiaceae - produces shades of yellow
- Mot'e - Vaccinium floribundum, familia Ericaceae -produces shades of burgundy
- Nogal (walnut) - Juglans neotropica, familia juglandaceae - produces shades of brown
- Q'aq'a sunkha - Usnea barbata, familia Usneaceae - produces shades of dark orange to brown
- Tayanka - Baccharis buxifolia, familia Asteraceae - produces shades of yellow to lime green

=== The Indigo Project ===
The strain of indigo found in pre-Columbian textiles is native to South America. After investigations and a long revival process, the CTTC establish a small plantation in the community of Huayro where it farms approximately five acres of native Indigófera suffruticosa plants. Indigo is the only plant in the world that produces blue dye. The process of extracting the dye from the leaves of the plant is long and laborious. After harvesting, leaves must be oxidized in large vats of water that are left to evaporate. The resultant mixture is then heated to remove remaining excess water and produce a hard cake of indigo dye. This dye is later mixed with human urine and left to ferment underground with the yarn for a month to produce the dyed yarn. The CTTC's Indigo Project seeks to maintain the unique strain of indigo native to South America, and serves to educate the public about the importance of natural dyes.

=== Replica Work ===
The CTTC is known internationally for its work in replicas of Pre-Columbian and Colonial textiles. The CTTC's replica projects include, amongst others:

- The Juanita Mummy - working jointly with Dr Bill Conklin, Jose Antonio Chavez (director of the Museo Santuarios Andinos at the Catholic University of Santa Maria in Arequipa), and National Geographic, weavers from the CTTC traveled to Arequipa to analyze the textiles of the Juanita Mummy, discovered by Johan Reinhard in 1995 on the Ampato Mountain above Arequipa. CTTC weavers replicated the lliklla (blanket), axsu (dress), and chumpi (belt), of the mummy after a laborious investigative process to determine the techniques and designs of the textiles. Chinchero weaver Carolina Concha W. comments that "When we went to the museum we wanted to open the showcase where 'Juanita' was exhibited, to touch, see and examine the designs. It was hard to see, and it was frozen. To replicate the designs was very difficult. We tried again and again until we thought that it might not have been woven in our style of warp-faced weaving. With great effort, the designs started to show, and I felt so excited! We discussed all kinds of commentaries and jokes, like Juanita didn't want us to replicate her designs and her textiles, but we did. I know that for some of us, it is still impossible to replicate the designs, but we feel very proud of weaving the heritage of our Incan textile."
- The poncho of Jose de San Martin - Contacted by an associate of the Museo Histórico Regional de Buenos Aires – Argentina, where the original piece is housed, weavers from the CTTC replicated the poncho of Jose de San Martin in complementary warp faced weave.
- The poncho of Simon Bolivar - Contacted by the director of the Museo Nacional de Arqueología, Antropología e Historia del Perú, weavers from the CTTC realized a replica of the poncho of Simon Bolivar.

=== Tinkuy: Gathering of the Textile Arts ===
Tinkuy is an international textile conference organized by CTTC approximately every three years starting in 2010. Tinkuy gathers together indigenous weavers, textile artists, anthropologists, art historians and textile enthusiasts. The conference is composed of lectures, presentations, workshops, demonstrations and other events. The next Tinkuy is scheduled for November 2017. During Tinkuy indigenous textile artists from across the world meet to share and celebrate their textile traditions.
