= Chuspas =

Pouch for coca leaves

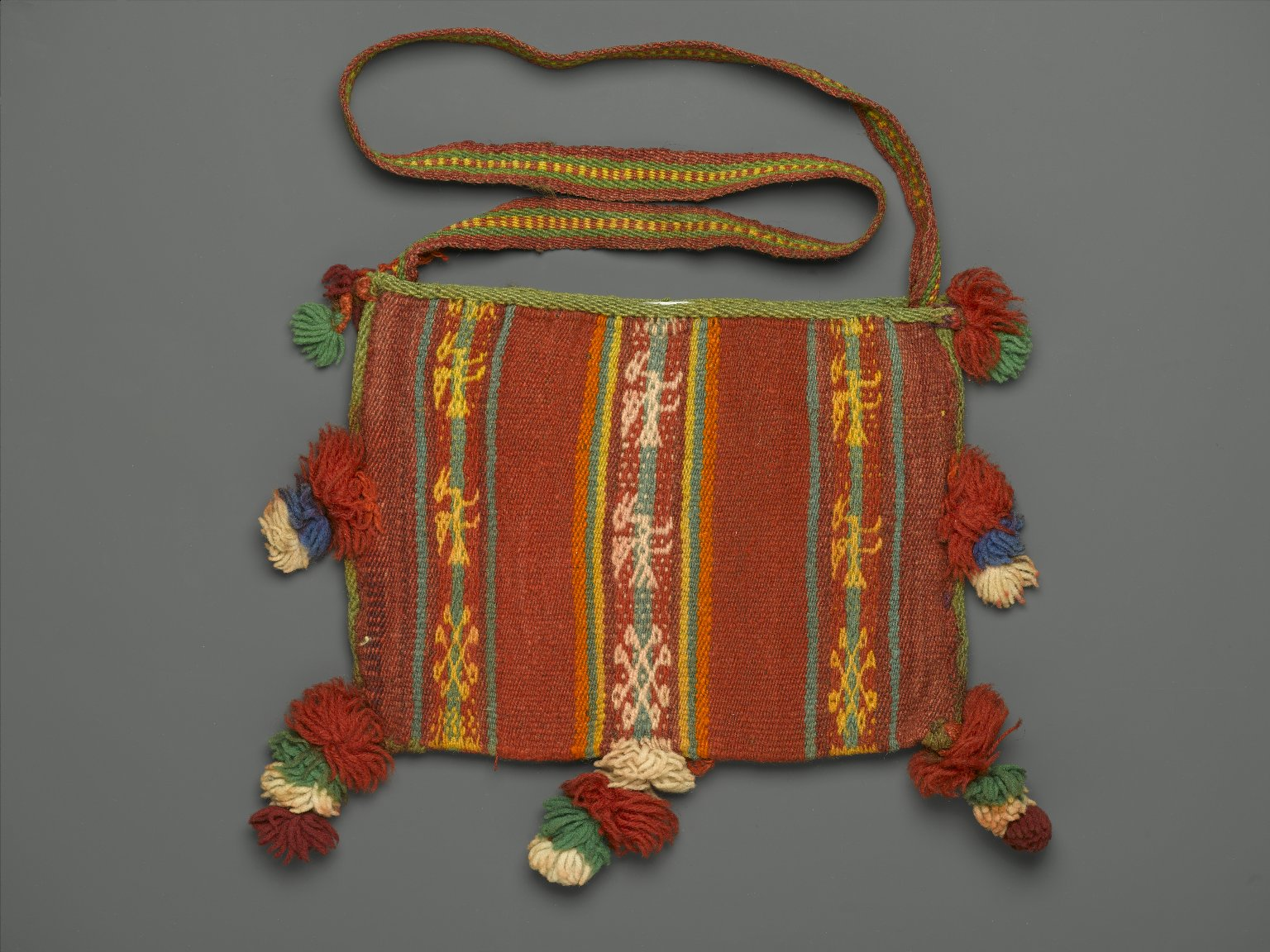
Chuspas, Bag for Carrying Coca Leaves, 20th Century, Brooklyn Museum

A chuspas (which is Quechua for bag) is a pouch that is used to carry coca leaves, used primarily in the Andean region of South America. Both textiles and coca are very important to the people in Andean South America. These chuspas are a vital piece of culture and are especially important to combat the bitter cold in the mountainous zones of the Andes. These bags are also a way to showcase the cloth which in itself is a primary artistic medium. Highland textiles are traditionally woven from the hair of native camelids, usually the domesticated alpacas and llamas, and more rarely, wild vicuña and guanaco. These pouches are important symbols of social identity. As part of this tradition, chuspas show to the rest of their people how skilled they are in weaving. They can express their artistic skills and display their cultural affiliation by creating these chuspas.

== History ==
Since the beginning of the first millennium AD, chuspas have been a constant presence in Andean society. Chuspas have endured changing fashions and technologies throughout the years, just like other pieces of fashion. Furthermore, as with other textiles in Andean South America, stylistic differences between chuspas distinguish them as products of particular regions and communities. However, chuspas are unique among Andean textiles because of the substance they hold, coca leaves. Coca leaves were often chewed on to satiate hunger and provide energy.

Long before the Spanish arrived in Peru, Andean artists portrayed people wearing chuspas, especially on pottery vessels. Between AD1 and 700, the Moche dominated the north coast of Peru, and during that time Moche ceramic artists produced lifelike representations of people, plants, and animals in molded ceramic vessels. Many of these representations depicted people carrying chuspas.

Depictions of chuspas in media have been around since pre-Hispanic times. Chuspas are particularly notable in the seventeenth century line drawings that accompany Felipe Guaman Poma de Ayala's length description of Inca customs. Guaman Poma includes chuspas in an extensive variety of contexts, as two individuals share coca during horticulture, in ritual settings, at funerals, in festivals, and in parades.

Written descriptions of Andean chuspas or huallqepos as they are called in Aymara, another widely spoken Andean language, are also remarkably consistent from the Spanish conquest to present. In 1609 Bernabe Cobo wrote that underneath his mantle and over his tunic a man would carry 'a small chuspa which hangs around the neck. It is more or less one span in length and about the same width. This bag hangs down by the waist under the right arm, and the strap from which it hangs passes over the left shoulder." There have been many visual and written representations of chuspas throughout the centuries which demonstrate the ubiquity of chuspas and suggest that coca bags are relatively straight forward and conservative items, but in fact variations are evident in the actual objects that have survived. Surviving chuspas reveal a great deal about the technological and artistic styles evident in the Andes at different periods.

== Crafting Chuspas ==
Chuspas are created using similar tools and techniques involved in making larger items, such as shawls and ponchos. Although the technologies are relatively simple, creating a chuspas can take more than a week, and for a much smaller object.

The crafting process incorporates three basic stages: spinning, weaving, and embellishing. Using a hand spindle, a weaver spins cotton, camelid fiber, or sheep's wool into a thread and then twists or piles two or more spun threads together to strengthen the yarn. When she has spun and piled enough yarn, the weaver turns to her loom. Horizontal ground looms are particularly common in the southern Andes, where most of the chuspas are made. Once the weaver has wrapped the loom by continuously wrapping a length of yarn in a figure-eight around the bars at each end of the loom, she can begin to interlace the weft threads into the warp to create a structure. Although plain weave is the simplest and most common, weavers use a range of more complex weaving techniques in order to achieve the elaborate designs seen in chuspas and other Andean cloth.

Regardless of the technique used, after the weaver is finished, she removes the loom pieces and is left with a four-selvage length of cloth, which is folded in half and stitched along the sides to create the basic bag shape of a chuspa. Although simple stitching is seen in some coca bags, weavers often create a tubular edging to ensure that the sides are more securely held together. This is achieved by extracting either a cross-knit loop stitch or hand-woven edge bindings. When the body of the bag is complete, the weaver adds straps. To finish, the weaver sews on tassels, fringes, beads, and other decorations according to local custom.

== See also ==
- Andean textiles
- Lliklla
- Aguayo
- Chullo
