= Chullo =

Knitted cap with ear flaps from the Andes

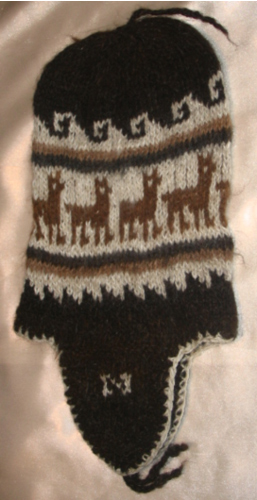
Alpaca chullo

A chullo (Spanish pronunciation: [ˈtʃuʎo], from Quechua: ch'ullu; known as lluch'u in Aymara) is an Andean style of hat with earflaps, made from vicuña, alpaca, llama or sheep's wool. Alpaca fleece has wool-like qualities that help to insulate chullo-wearers from the harsh conditions in the Andean mountain region. Chullos often have ear-flaps that can be tied under the chin, to further warm the wearer's head.

Hats have been worn in the Andean mountain region by indigenous peoples for thousands of years. Wearing different types and colors has a significance among certain Andean natives. According to Peruvian historian Arturo Jiménez Borja, the chullo has its origins in the cultural exchange between Spaniards, who incorporated elements of their birretes and the original hat of the Andeans.

Compare the so-called "sherpa hat" associated with the Himalayas.

== See also ==
- List of hat styles
- Andean culture
- Andean textiles
- Aguayo
- Chuspas
- Lliklla
- Craig Tucker, fictional character notable for his blue chullo hat
