= Mateo Pumacahua =

Peruvian Royalist commander

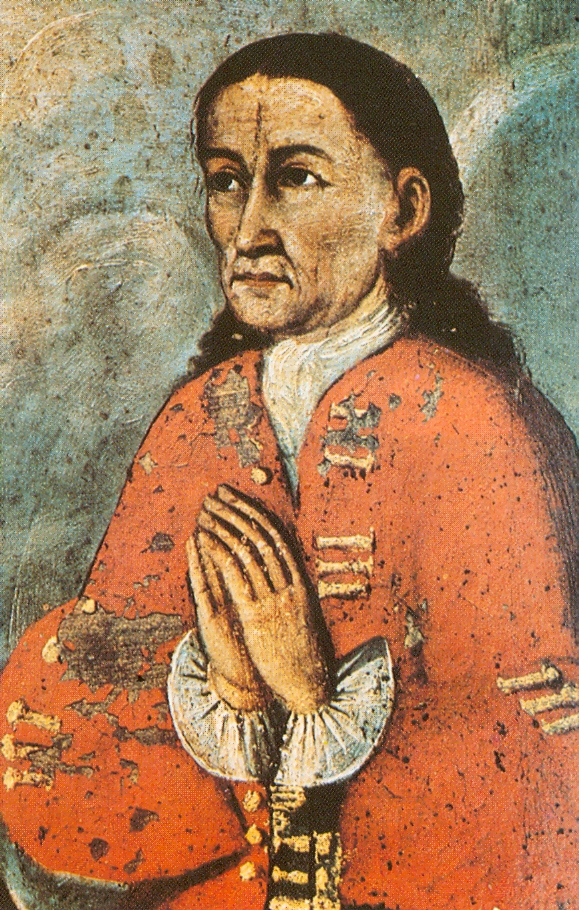
- Portrait now at the Museo Inka, Cuzco

Personal details
- Born: September 21, 1740 Chinchero, Cusco
- Died: March 17, 1815 (aged 74) Sicuani, Cusco
- Profession: Soldier

Military service
- Years of service: 1780–1814
- Battles/wars: Rebellion of Túpac Amaru II; Bolivian War of Independence; Cuzco Rebellion of 1814

Mateo García Pumacahua (September 21, 1740 – March 17, 1815) simply known as Pumacahua, modern spelling variants Pumakawa or Pumaqawa (meaning "he who stalks with the stealth of a puma", from Quechua Puma cougar, puma, Qawa sentinel, serene, "he who observes or monitors shrewdly") was a Royalist commander later turned into a Peruvian revolutionary who led the Cuzco Rebellion of 1814 in the War of Independence.

== Biography ==
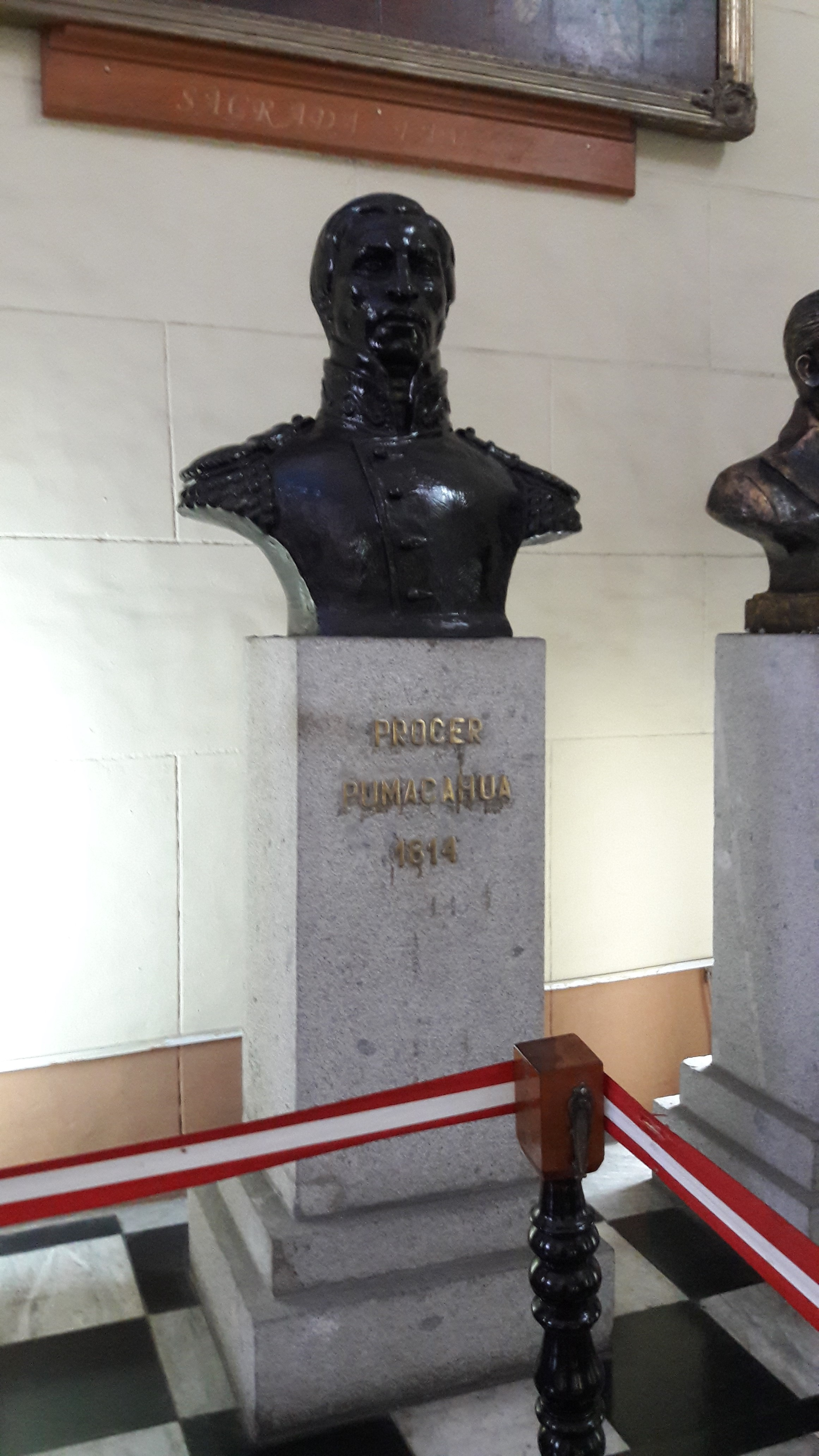
Effigy of Pumacahua in the Panteón de los Próceres in Lima.

Pumakawa was the kuraka (Quechua for cacique) of Chinchero, soldier of the militia of the Viceroyalty of Peru, and interim president of the Audiencia of Cuzco. Pumaqawa was a member of the Inca nobility of Ayarmaca descent, who also has some Spanish ancestry.

He was appointed commander of the Royalist Army militias against Túpac Amaru II. Reason for this is because Amaru's uprising caught off guard colonial authorities and caused major tumult in Lima, as the colonial authorities were largely unprepared and scarce of troops in order to deal with the revolt, for this reason, Spanish colonial authorities decided to organize an army composed largely of native conscripts, a tactic repeated in the Peruvian independence wars where the Spanish royalist army of Peru was composed, outside of commanding leaders, almost entirely of levy indigenous soldiers.

As Pumakawa became head of the Royal Army indigenous militias, he persecuted José Gabriel Condorcanqui (Tupac Amaru II) during his rebellion of 1780 and 1781, Pumakawa made major contributions to the royal cause with accouterments and men. He gained prestige among the Inca nobility of Cuzco, being elected Real Ensign of Noble Indians of Cuzco in 1802.

Pumacahua defeated the rebel army of Tupac Amaru II in 1781, an event depicted in a mural at the church of Chinchero, although he received fame and prestige for Amaru's capture, his role was little acknowledged outside of Cuzco and Peru in spite of the fact that it was Pumaqawa, more than anyone, who defeated Tupac Amaru II. Higher-rank Spanish authorities such as the Viceroy Agustín de Jáuregui, who resided in Lima for all the duration of the conflict, received most of the credit and praise for the capture and defeat of Tupac Amaru II.

Three decades later, despite being in his seventies, Pumakawa led the — essentially indigenous — militias of the Royal Army of Peru, the bulk of the army, in the expeditions of the Peruvian viceroy José Fernando de Abascal sent against the junta of La Paz in Upper Peru during 1811. Despite having won the battle of Guaqui as colonel of the Royal Army, he and a portion of his troops joined the insurrection of central and southern of Viceroyalty of Peru (Cuzco, Huamanga, Arequipa and Puno) started in Cuzco on August 3, 1814, demanding the full implementation of the Spanish Constitution of 1812 in Peru. Pumacahua was appointed member of the governing junta. Pumacahua led the forces that occupied Arequipa on November 10. On November 30, Pumacahua's troops retreated from Arequipa to the Cuzco and Puno regions. On March 11, 1815, Pumacahua and his troops were defeated in the battle of Umachiri. He was captured and executed in May by the royal army militias.

== Rebellion of Túpac Amaru II ==
On November 4, 1780, the great Rebellion of Túpac Amaru II began, threatening Spanish rule over large areas of southern Peru. As in much of the Indies, the rebellion was practically defenseless against the authorities. Throughout the viceroyalty, there was only one regiment of regular troops, the Royal Regiment of Lima, made up of mostly American soldiers, as were the subordinate commanders, although the superiors were mostly Spanish. Auxiliary elements included militia units, recruited locally and of varying quality.

== See also ==
- Bolivian War of Independence
