= Chinchero International Airport =

Airport under construction in Peru

Chinchero International Airport Aeropuerto Internacional de Chinchero
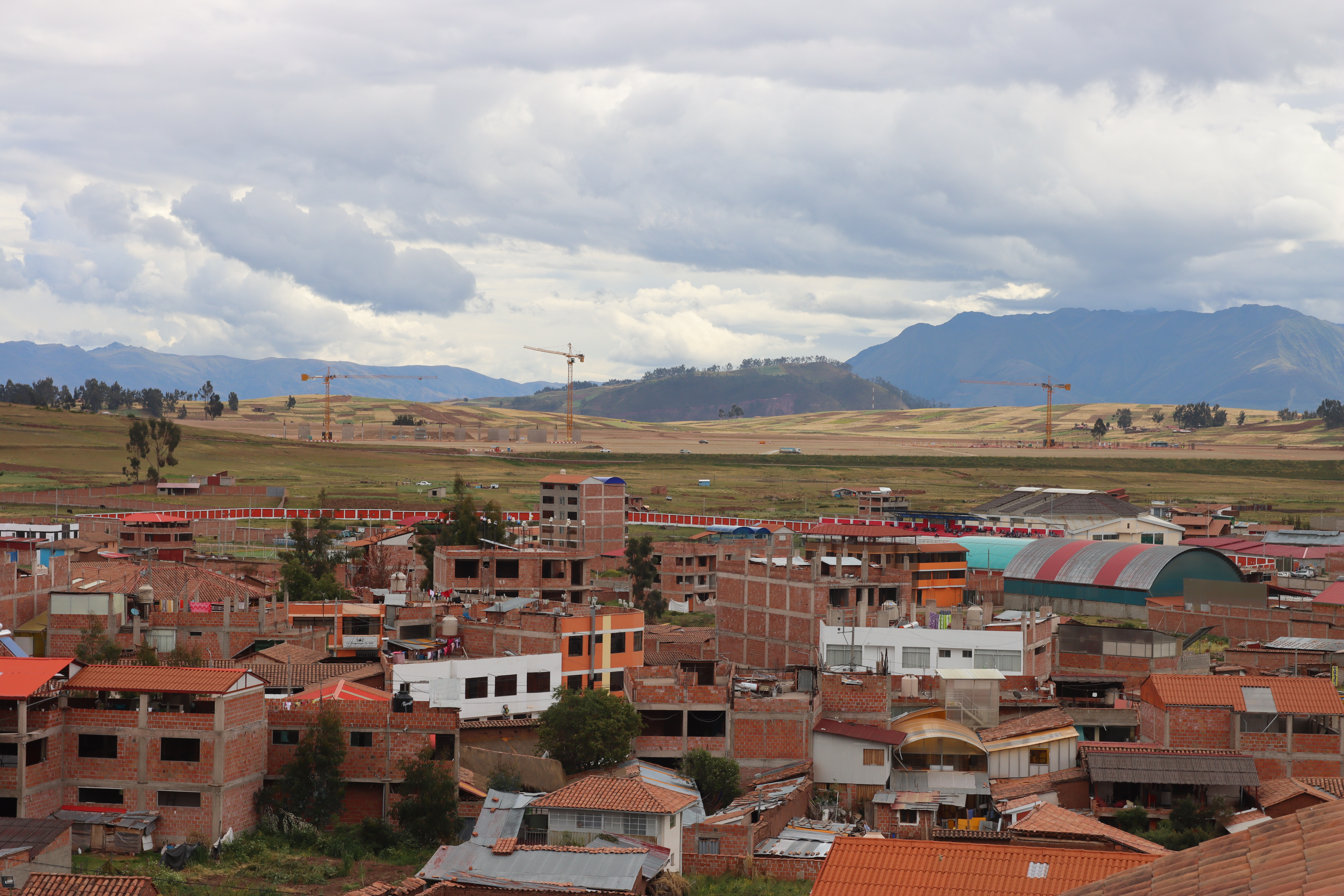
- Site of the airport in May 2023
- IATA: none; ICAO: none

Summary
- Airport type: Public
- Operator: Aeropuertos Andinos del Perú
- Serves: Cusco
- Location: Chinchero, Urubamba, Peru
- Opened: Late 2027 - Early 2028 (planned)
- Elevation AMSL: 12,205 ft / 3,720 m
- Coordinates: 13.41°S 72.06°W
- Website: chinchero.pe
- Interactive map of Chinchero International Airport

Runways
Direction	Length		Surface
Direction	m	ft	Surface
16/34	4,000	13,123	Asphalt

Chinchero International Airport is an under construction international airport in the town of Chinchero, which is located in the district of the same name, in Cusco Region, Peru. It is planned to replace Alejandro Velasco Astete International Airport. Its altitude is 3,720 metres (12,200 ft) above sea level.

== History ==
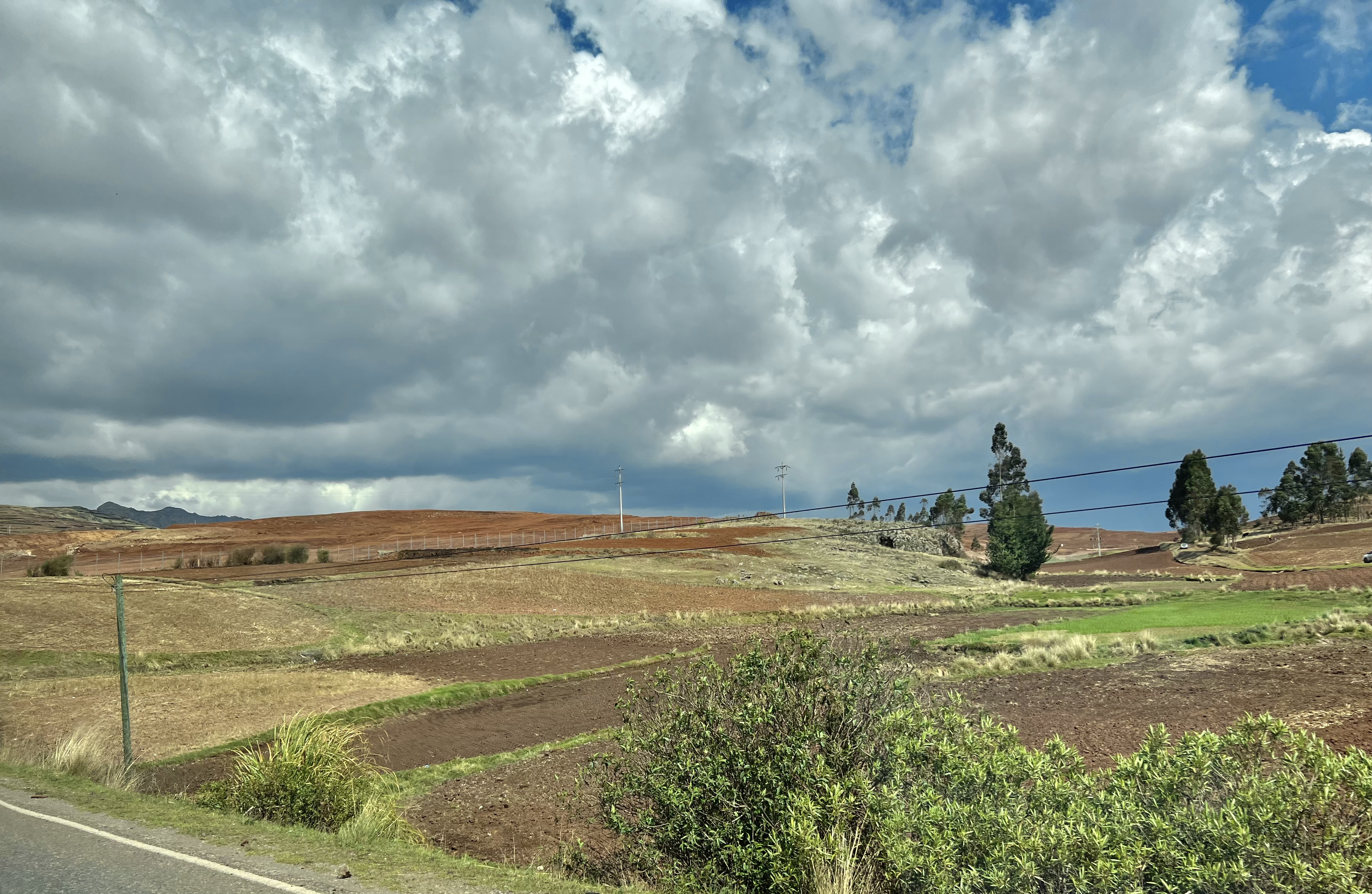
Site of the airport in November 2021

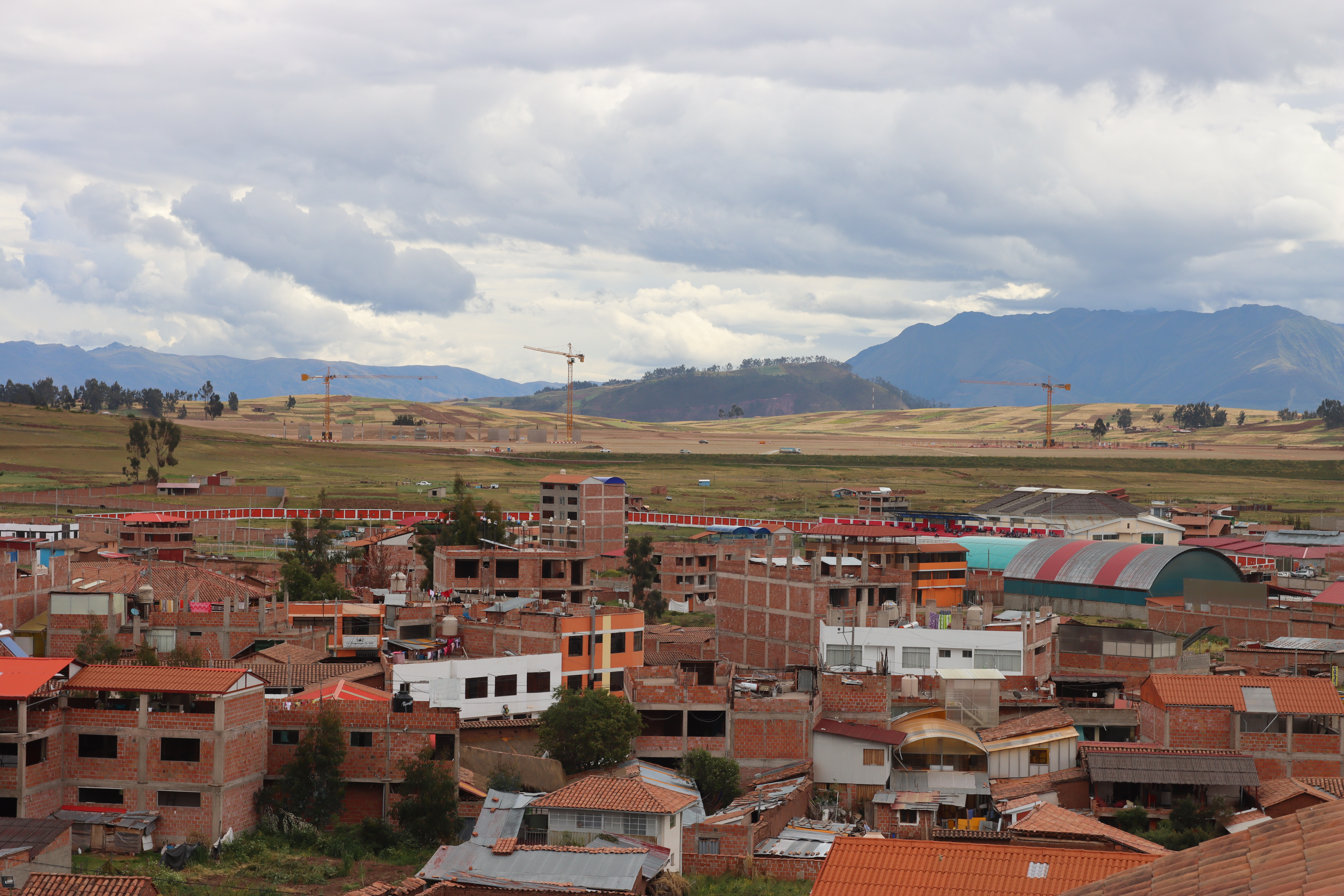
Site of the airport in May 2023

The idea of an airport in Chinchero began in 1978 when the Peruvian government decided to develop a new airport in the area, though plans were indefinitely delayed due to the internal conflict in Peru. As the conflict subsided, residents in the development area agreed to sell their land in 2011 and in 2012, President Ollanta Humala signed laws to allow the expropriation of land necessary for the airport. On 3 February 2017, President Pedro Pablo Kuczynski announced the beginning of the construction of the new Chinchero International Airport.

Construction of the airport began in 2019. Peru and South Korea announced on 24 October 2019 that South Korea would collaborate on the construction of the airport, providing technical assistance.

At the time of unveiling plans for the airport, the anticipated opening date was 2021. However, due to the COVID-19 pandemic in Peru, the opening of the airport was delayed to 2025. On 19 November 2021, Hyundai Engineering & Construction broke ground for the airport in a ceremony attended by the company's president Yoon Young-joon.

In June 2024, construction delays pushed back the estimated completion date once again to September 2026, with accelerated completion possible by April 2026.

In October 2024, Peruvian president Dina Boluarte signed an addendum to the construction contract, in which the scope of work for the Natividad de Chinchero Consortium was reduced to terminal construction. A bidding process for the construction of the runway and control tower will take place in 2025, with construction projected to take place in the first half of 2026.

== Plans ==
Chinchero is planned to operate around the clock and will open with the capacity to serve five million passengers annually. Expansion plans include an additional capacity of up to eight million passengers.

== Controversy ==
=== Cultural impact ===
The airport project is opposed by archaeologists and local activists due to its potential to destroy historic landmarks and bring additional tourist traffic that would harm Machu Picchu. In 2019, UNESCO called on Peru to cease plans for construction until a heritage impact study could be performed in regard to Machu Picchu, Cusco and the Qhapaq Ñan. The World Monuments Fund again asked President Francisco Sagasti in February 2021 to delay further construction in respect of the recommendations by UNESCO, with the organization stating "The land removal will mean the irreversible destruction of the cultural landscape of Chinchero".

=== Environment ===
The construction of the airport would directly affect the area's ecosystem. According to Óscar Paredes Pando of the National University of Saint Anthony the Abbot in Cuzco, the airport would destroy at least seventeen natural springs that provide water to lakes and other wetlands in Cusco.

=== Function ===
Initial plans to provide direct flights from Europe and the United States provide opportunities for foreign travelers to bypass Jorge Chávez International Airport in Lima during their visits to Cusco. The Ministry of Transport and Communications announced months after construction began in 2019 that transoceanic flights were not possible due to the altitude of the airport while Bruno Papi, a veteran pilot of the Peruvian Air Force, said that the airport may not be able to operate at all due to the difficult mountainous terrain and altitude.
