= Nilda Callañaupa Alvarez =

Indigenous Quechuau weaver

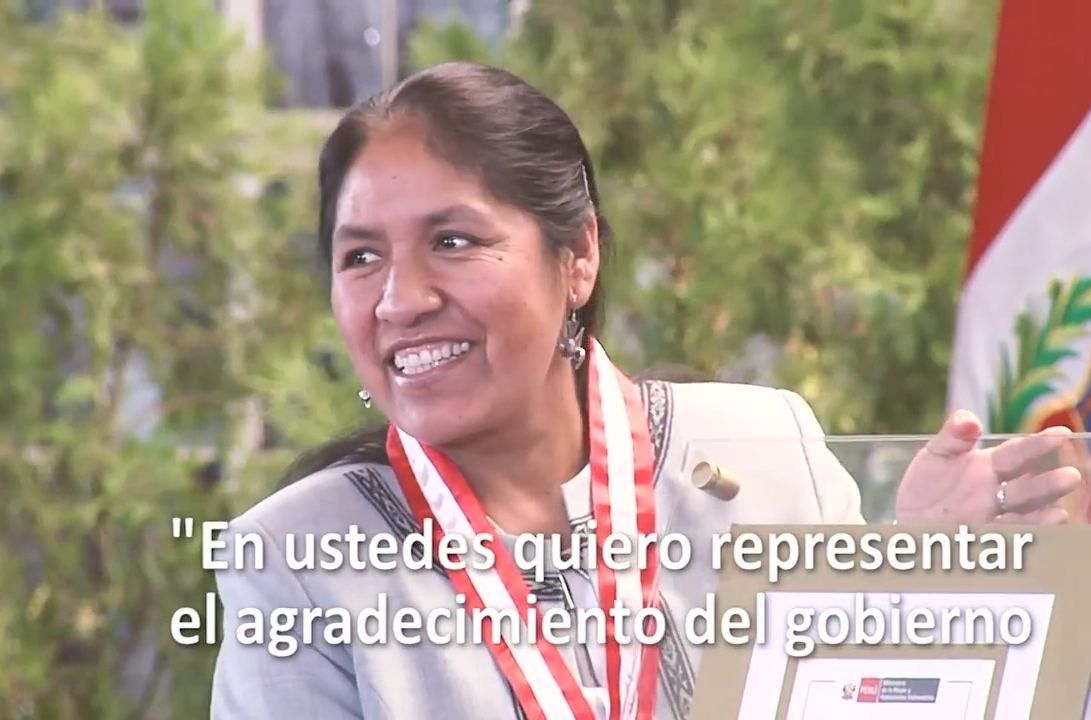
- Callañaupa receiving a merit award in 2018
- Born: 1960 (age 65–66); Chinchero, Cusco, Peru
- Education: National University of Saint Anthony the Abbot in Cuzco
- Known for: Center for Traditional Textiles of Cusco

Nilda Callañaupa Alvarez (born 1960) is an indigenous Quechua weaver from Chinchero in the Cusco region of Peru. Along with other Quechua weavers from Chinchero as well as international supporters, she helped to establish the Center for Traditional Textiles of Cusco (CTTC) in 1996 as a non-profit organization. Since 1996, Callañaupa has served as director of the CTTC. She has written two books on Peruvian weaving, and has co-authored a third on weaving elders of the Peruvian Andes.

== Biography ==
On her maternal side, Callañaupa's grandfather was Spanish and her grandmother was Quechua. After her grandfather died at an early age, her grandmother supported the family through making and selling textiles. Callañaupa's grandmother taught Callañaupa's mother, Guadelupe Alvarez, how to weave, who in turn taught her daughters. Callañaupa and other members of her family are often described as "master Quechua weavers"

Callañaupa grew up in the 1960s in Chinchero, Peru. Her parents earned their living through agriculture. When Callañaupa was four, her mother began to bring her daughter with her to their chakra (fields) By the time she was six, Callañaupa was trusted to watch a flock of sheep alone. While tending her flock, Callañaupa befriended an elderly shepherdess, Doña Sebestiana, who was a highly skilled spinner. Callañaupa attributes her interest in textiles to Doña Sebastiana, whose work was so fine that young Callañaupa dreamt of spinning at night.

From her mother Guadalupe, Callañaupa learned basic weaving designs. Her interest piqued, she also began studying textiles from other communities that her father brought home from his travels. When Edward and Christine Franquemont, a husband and wife pair of ethnobotanists from the US, arrived in Chinchero in the 1970s to conduct investigations, Callañaupa befriended them and taught them the basics of weaving. With the encouragement and support of the Franquemonts, as well as other international supporters, Callañaupa eventually obtained a grant to study historical textiles in Berkeley, California where she experimented with different looms.

Callañaupa holds a degree from the National University of Saint Anthony the Abbot in Cuzco, 1986. She was one of the first women from her community to attend university, as during this time only men were expected to continue on to higher education. Nilda has taught internationally at museums and universities in the US and Canada, including Cornell University and the Smithsonian.

In 1996 Nilda was one of the key founders of the Center for Traditional Textiles of Cusco (CTTC), a non-profit based in the city of Cusco. Since the 1970s a group of women weavers from Chinchero met informally to recover old designs and sell textiles in the tourist market, and in this way earn an independent income from their male relatives. Nilda was a leader of this group which met in the courtyard of her family's home. This informal group of weavers was the basis of the Centro de Textiles Tradicionales del Cusco which since 1996 has partnered with ten weaving communities in the region of Cusco to recover textile traditions and empower weavers. Since 1996 Callañaupa Alvarez has served as director of CTTC.

== Author ==
Callañaupa Alvarez has written two books and co-authored a third.

=== Weaving in the Peruvian Highlands: Dreaming Patterns, Weaving Memories ===
Published in 2007 (available in Spanish or English), this book provides a general survey of textile traditions from nine communities of the Cusco region. Sections of the book include: traditional clothing, the weaving process, designs, textile traditions, and preserving traditions, in which detailed information is provided on the parts of the loom, dyeing plants (natural dye), and the significance of designs.

=== Textile Traditions of Chinchero: A Living Heritage ===
Published in 2012, this bi-lingual book takes a closer look at the weaving traditions of Callañaupa Alvarez's hometown of Chinchero. While her first book provides a cursory glimpse into various weaving communities, Textile Traditions of Chinchero delves deeper and explores in depth the many complex traditions of a single community. Sections of the book include historical information on Chinchero, traditional textiles and clothing, stages of textile production, Chinchero designs, and the impact of the CTTC.

=== Faces of Tradition: Weaving Elders of the Andes ===
Co-authored with Christine Franquemont.

Published in 2013, this book features the photography of Joe Coca. Stylistically a cross between a photography book and biography, it tells the individual stories of weaving masters from various communities in the Cusco region. Divided into sections by community, each chapter begins with an introduction about the community and then explores the individual life histories of weaving elders through text and photo. Faces of Tradition was the Gold Award winner in the Multicultural division of the 2014 Benjamin Franklin Awards, which are recognized as one of the highest awards in the US for independent publishers.

== Other ==
In 2016 Alvarez was invited to TedWomen along with her sister Adela Callañaupa Alvarez, also a weaver from Chinchero, to present about the Centro de Textiles Tradicionales del Cusco.
