= Abby Franquemont =

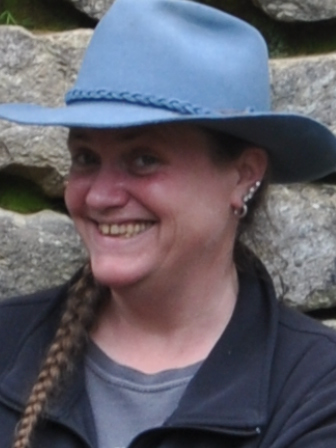
- Abby Franquemont, 2019
- Born: Abigail M. Franquemont; 1972 (age 53–54); Massachusetts, United States
- Occupations: Spinner, weaver, writer, fiber crafts educator
- Known for: Reviving the ancient art of hand spinning with a spindle
- Notable work: Respect the Spindle (2009)

Abigail M. Franquemont (born 1972) is an American textile crafts writer, lecturer and educator, based in Cusco, Peru. She spent her early childhood among the Quechua people of Chinchero, Peru, where "women spun to eat and pay for the home they lived in." As a revivalist of the ancient art of hand spinning with the spindle, she published her book, Respect the Spindle, in 2009.

== Early life and family ==
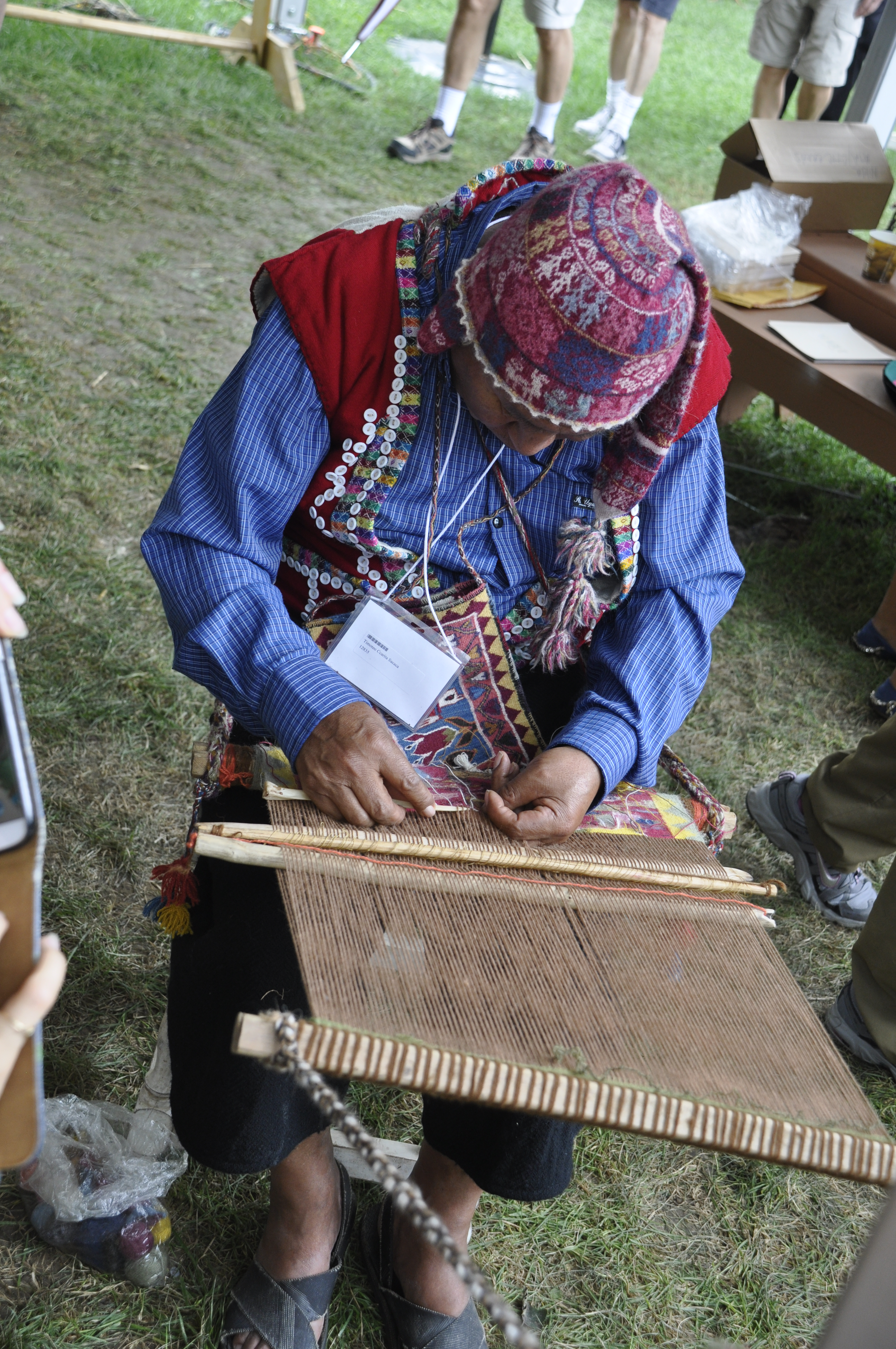
Chinchero weaver

Abigail M. Franquemont was born in Massachusetts. Her parents were anthropologists Ed Franquemont (1945–2003) and Christine Robinson Franquemont (1948–2013). According to Ann Peters in Andean Past, Ed and Chris met at Harvard, traveled as hippies with their children to Chinchero, Peru, and settled there to join the community and study traditional knowledge of weaving, construction and agriculture in 1976 "in the context of social change". They returned to the U.S. around 1982, and by 1985 the family had moved to Ithaca, New York, where the couple continued to research, and to contribute to the community there.

Franquemont's younger sister, Molly Anne Franquemont (b. 1975), was reported missing in May 2013. Glen Griggs of Sunnyvale, California was suspected of her murder, but was shot and killed by police in 2014.

=== Textile arts background ===
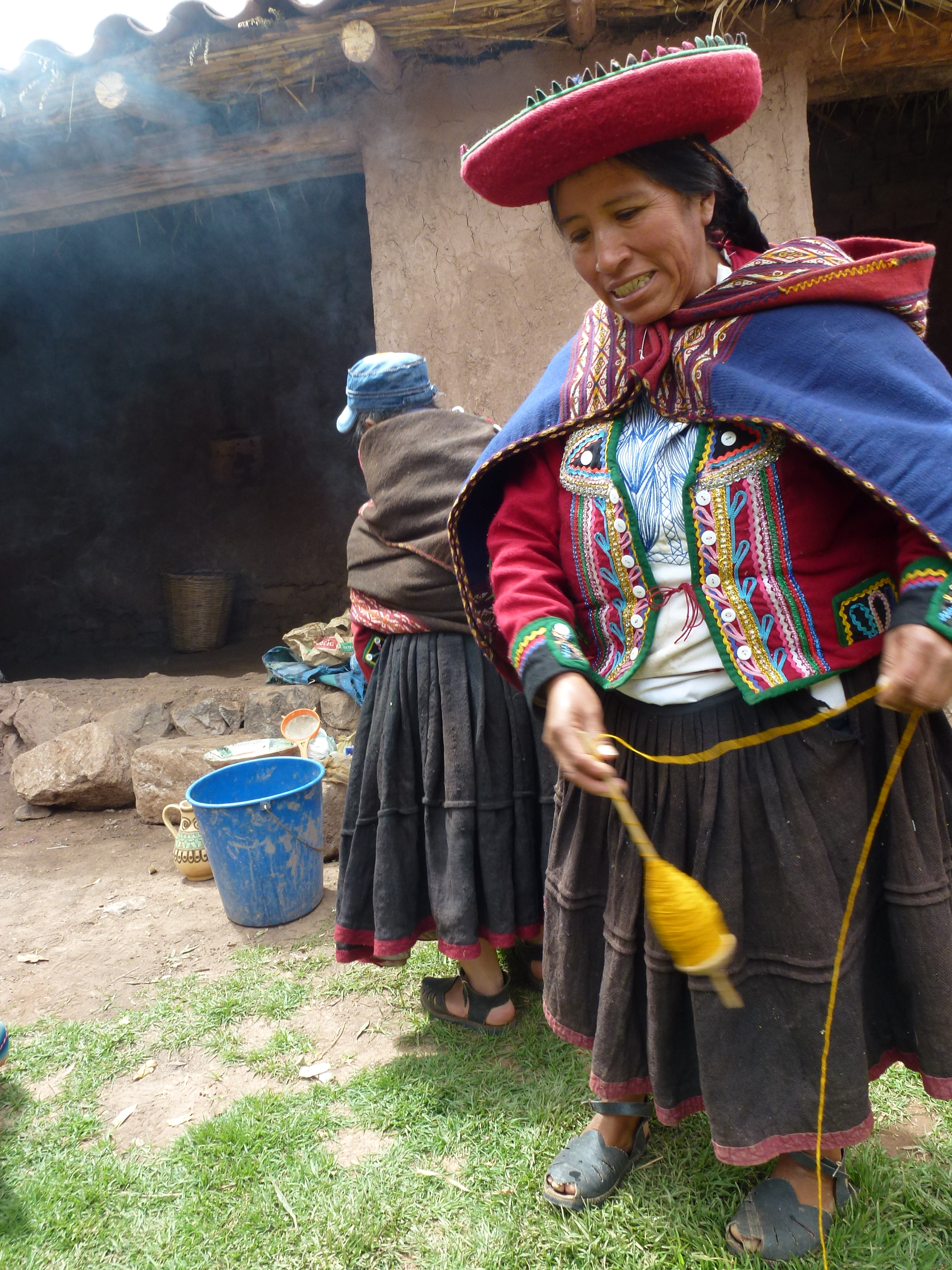
Chinchero spinner

Franquemont was born into a textile environment. She remembers "falling asleep under her father's loom." Among friends in Chinchero, Franquemont and her sister spent their early childhoods within the hand spinning and hand weaving culture of the local Quechua people, before those ancient skills began to be lost to the influence of Western society, as described in Respect the Spindle (2009). In a world where "women...spun to eat and pay for the home they lived in," the Franquemont girls learned to spin alpaca fiber at or before the age of five years, hoping to reach a professional standard before adulthood. Spinning was part of their play. After the family's return to America, Franquemont attended Lehman Alternative Community School, Ithaca, then read liberal arts at Bard College at Simon's Rock.

== Career ==
=== Franquemont Fibers ===
Franquemont worked in the textile business and system software until 2006, when she founded Franquemont Fibers LLC. The company supplies products for the spinning and fiber arts. It also allows her to pursue her vocation as a fiber arts educator and consultant. She has been described by Interweave as "a fiber artist, teacher, technical editor, and writer whose work has appeared in Spin-Off, Spindicity, and Twist Collective".

=== Writing ===
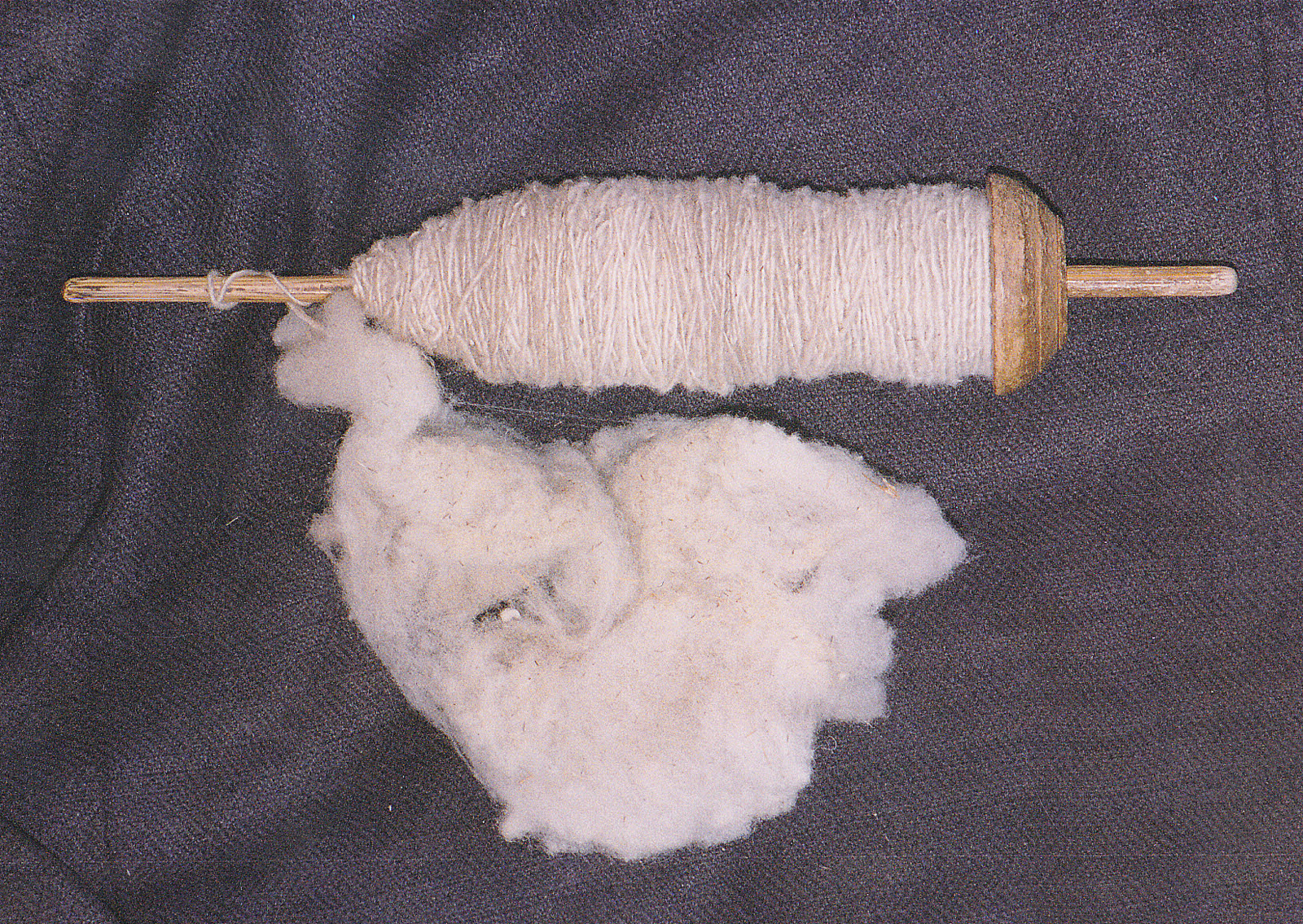
Peruvian spindle with alpaca fiber

In 2009 she published the hand spinning instruction book, Respect the Spindle. The book outlines her personal experience of the place of hand spinning within the indigenous community of Chinchero in the 1970s, discusses the physics of hand spinning with spindles, and describes the techniques required for this. One of the reasons why she has supported the revival of the use of hand spindles is that, as her father said, in comparison with the spinning wheel "spindles (are) slower by the hour, but faster by the week." According to Franquemont, he meant that one can use a spindle while travelling or walking around, thus increasing potential spinning time.

In the spring 2010 issue of Spin-Off magazine she clarifies the difference between bobbin-driven and flyer-driven spinning wheels. In the summer 2015 edition she discusses the origins of Andean plying.

=== Videos, teaching and lecturing ===
Franquemont took part in Knitting Daily TV, Series 300 in 2009. She also published or took part in various video downloads, including: Drafting: The Long and Short of It (Interweave 2010), Handspinning Prep Matters: Making Sense of Batts, Roving, Rolags, and More (Interweave 2015), New Spinner's Guide to Troubleshooting (Interweave 2015) and Get More Spun: Spinning to Knit Large Projects (Interweave, 2015), and she has lectured at "The National Needlearts Association (TNNA), Golden Gate Fiber Institute, the Spin-Off Autumn Retreat (SOAR), Sock Summit, the Taos Wool Festival, New York State Sheep & Wool (Rhinebeck), Southeastern Animal Fiber Fair (SAFF), and Fibre East in Bedfordshire, UK."
