= Chinchero District =

Chinchero Chinchiru
- District
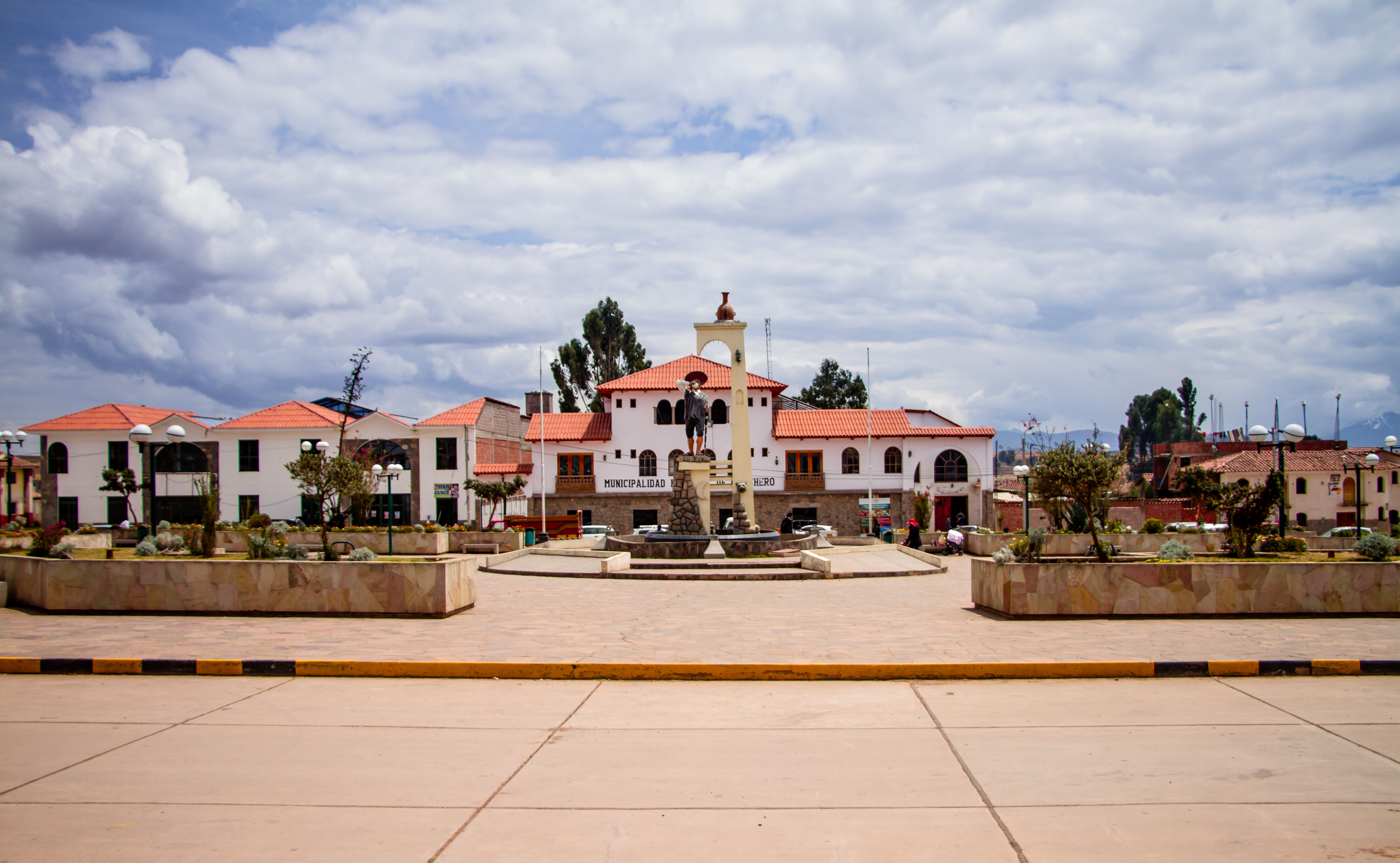
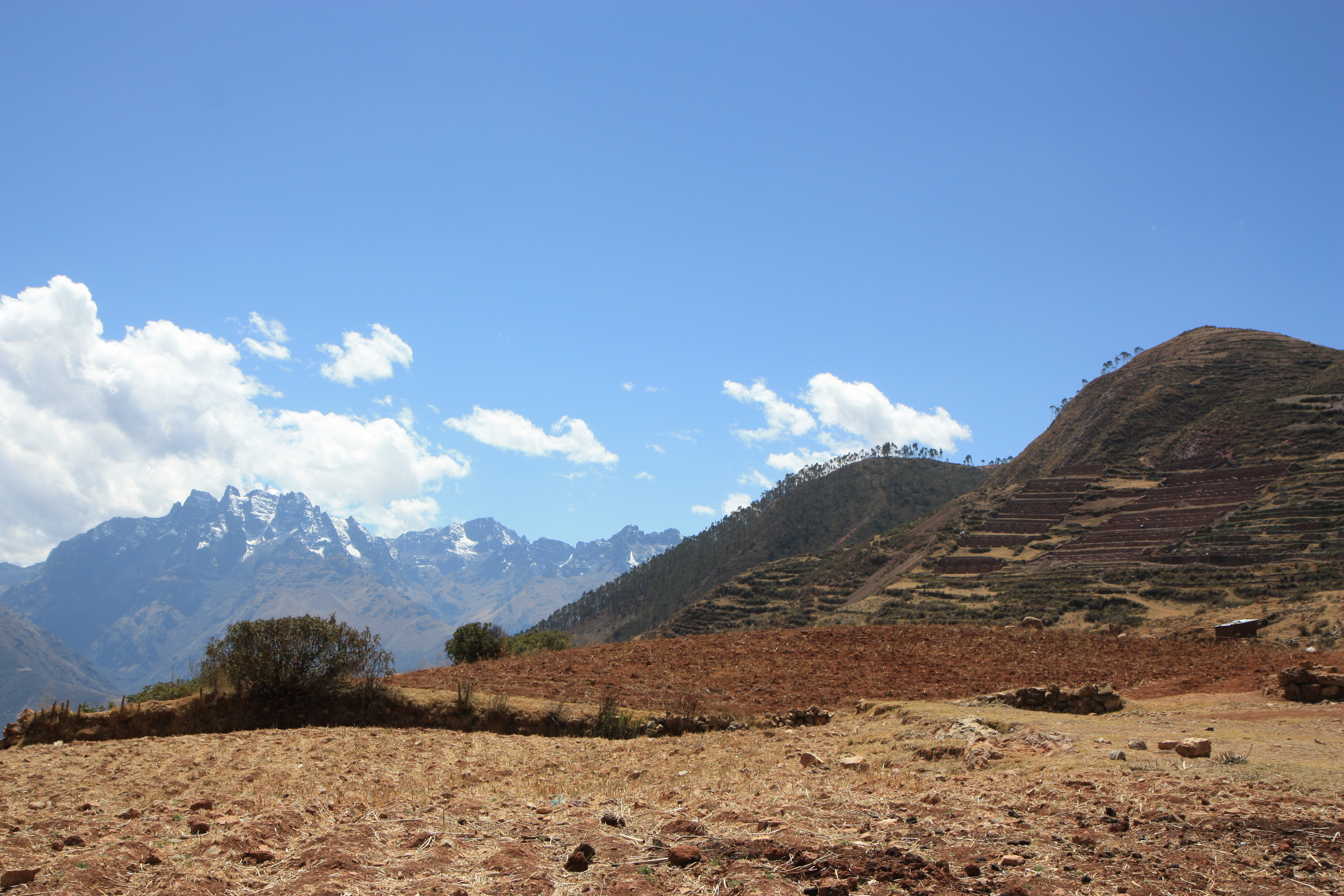
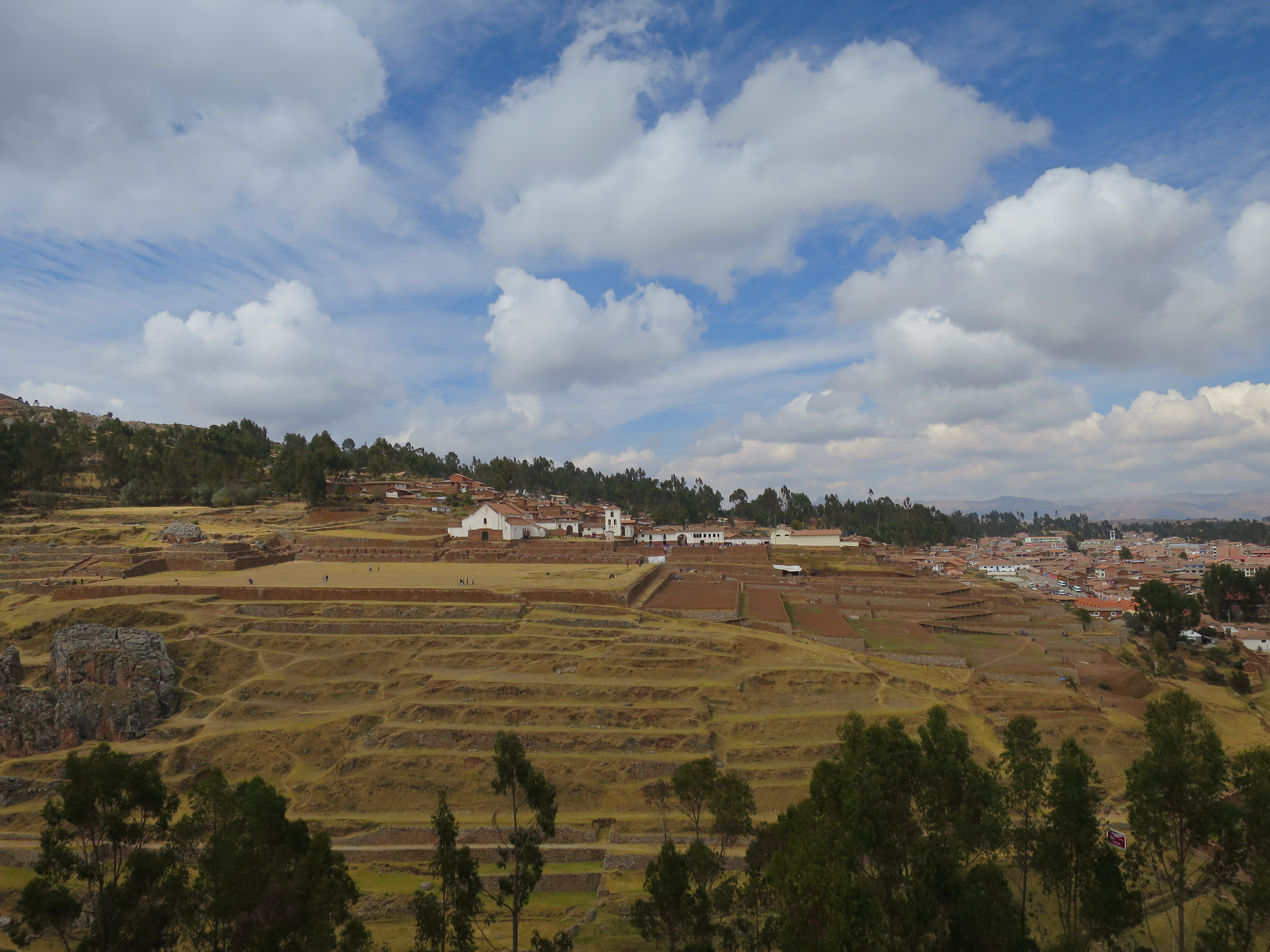
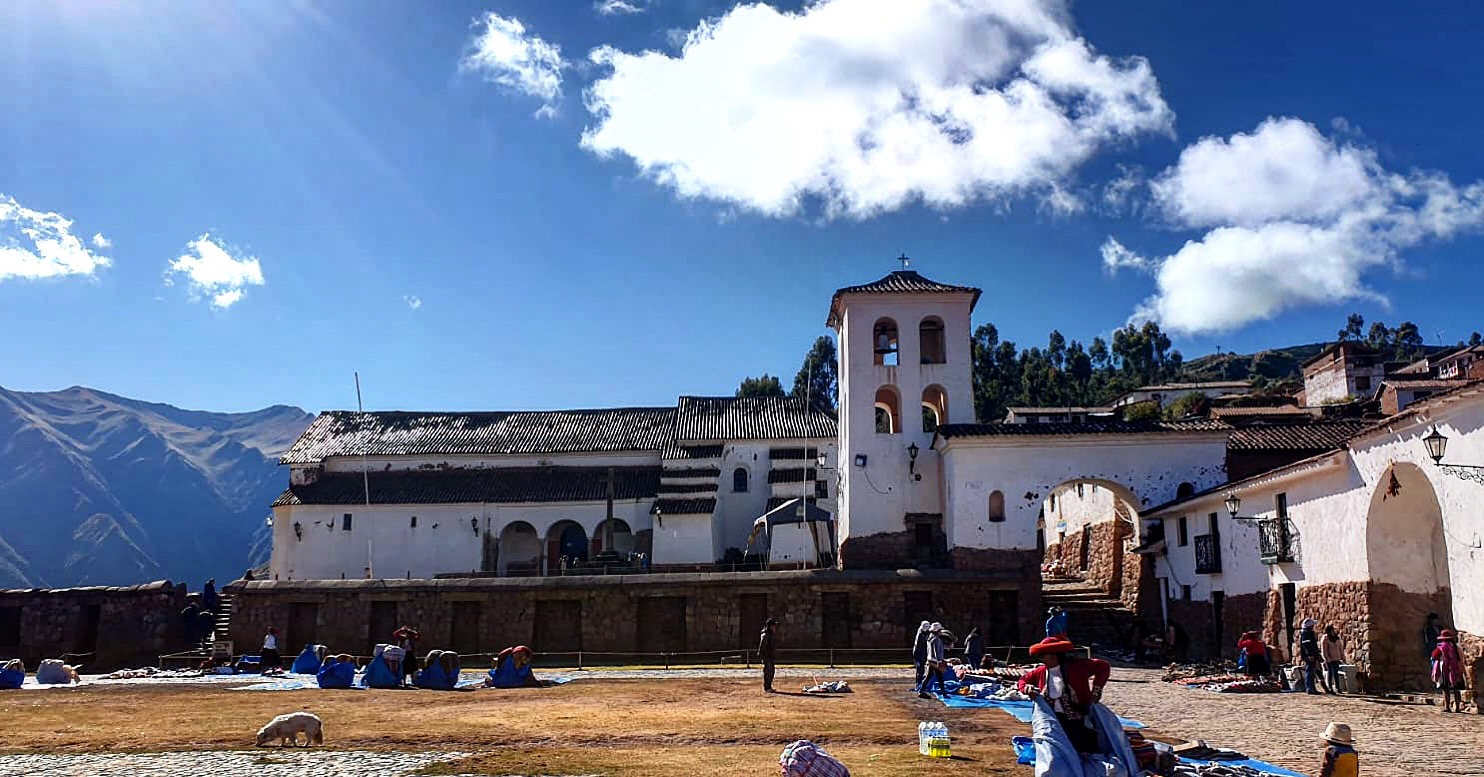
- Plaza Chinchero Rural terraces Overview of the town Church of Nuestra Señora de la Natividad
- Interactive map of Chinchero
- Coordinates: 13°23′28″S 72°2′52″W
- Country: Peru
- Region: Cusco
- Province: Urubamba
- Founded: September 9, 1905
- Capital: Chinchero

Government
  - Mayor: Luis Hector Cusicuna Quispe

Area
  - Total: 94.57 km^{2} (36.51 sq mi)
- Elevation: 3,762 m (12,343 ft)

Population (2025)
  - Total: 12,876
  - Density: 136.2/km^{2} (352.6/sq mi)
- Time zone: UTC-5 (PET)
- UBIGEO: 081302
- Website: munichinchero.gob.pe

Chinchero District is one of seven districts of the Urubamba Province in Peru. The town of Chinchero is the capital of the district. It is the location for the proposed Chinchero International Airport, which would serve travelers to the Cusco Region.

== Geography ==
One of the highest peaks of the district is Hatun Luychu at approximately 4,400 m (14,400 ft). Other mountains are listed below:

- Ichhu Kancha
- Kunka Kunka
- K'usi Qaqa
- Pata Kancha
- Quri Qucha Punta
- Quri Qucha Qaqa
- Sinqa
- Wallata Wachana
- Wanakawri (Anta-Urubamba)
- Yuthu Pukyu

== Ethnic groups ==
The people that live in the district are mainly indigenous citizens of Quechua descent. Quechua is the language which the majority of the population (81.49%) learnt to speak in childhood, 17.95% of the residents started speaking using the Spanish language (2007 Peru Census).

== Climate ==
Chinchero has a dry-winter subpolar oceanic climate (Köppen climate classification: Cwc), that borders very closely on both a tundra climate (Köppen climate classification: ET), and a cold semi-arid climate (Köppen climate classification: BSk).

Climate data for Chincheros, Peru (1981–2010)
Month	Jan	Feb	Mar	Apr	May	Jun	Jul	Aug	Sep	Oct	Nov	Dec	Year
Mean daily maximum °C (°F)	16 (61)	16 (61)	16 (61)	17 (63)	16 (61)	16 (61)	16 (61)	16 (61)	17 (63)	18 (64)	17 (63)	17 (63)	16.5 (61.7)
Mean daily minimum °C (°F)	4 (39)	3 (37)	3 (37)	1 (34)	−2 (28)	−4 (25)	−6 (21)	−4 (25)	−1 (30)	1 (34)	2 (36)	3 (37)	0 (32)
Average precipitation mm (inches)	117 (4.6)	81 (3.2)	72 (2.8)	36 (1.4)	3 (0.1)	3 (0.1)	0 (0)	9 (0.4)	12 (0.5)	24 (0.9)	45 (1.8)	51 (2.0)	453 (17.8)
Average precipitation days (≥ 1.0 mm)	17	10	13	7	2	2	0	2	4	6	8	9	81
Source: WW

== Notable residents ==
The anthropologists Ed and Chris Franquemont lived among the Chinchero people during the 1970s, studying traditional textile production techniques. Their daughter Abby Franquemont, having spent her childhood within a spinning culture, later became a revivalist of hand spinning with the spindle.

== See also ==
- Center for Traditional Textiles of Cusco (Centro de Textiles Tradicionales del Cusco, CTTC)
- Lliklla
- Nilda Callañaupa Alvarez
- List of archaeological sites in Peru
