= Tupu (pin) =

Traditional garment fastener of the Andes

Worn for over 1700 years throughout the Andean regions of South America, tupu pins were worn primarily by women.

== Background ==
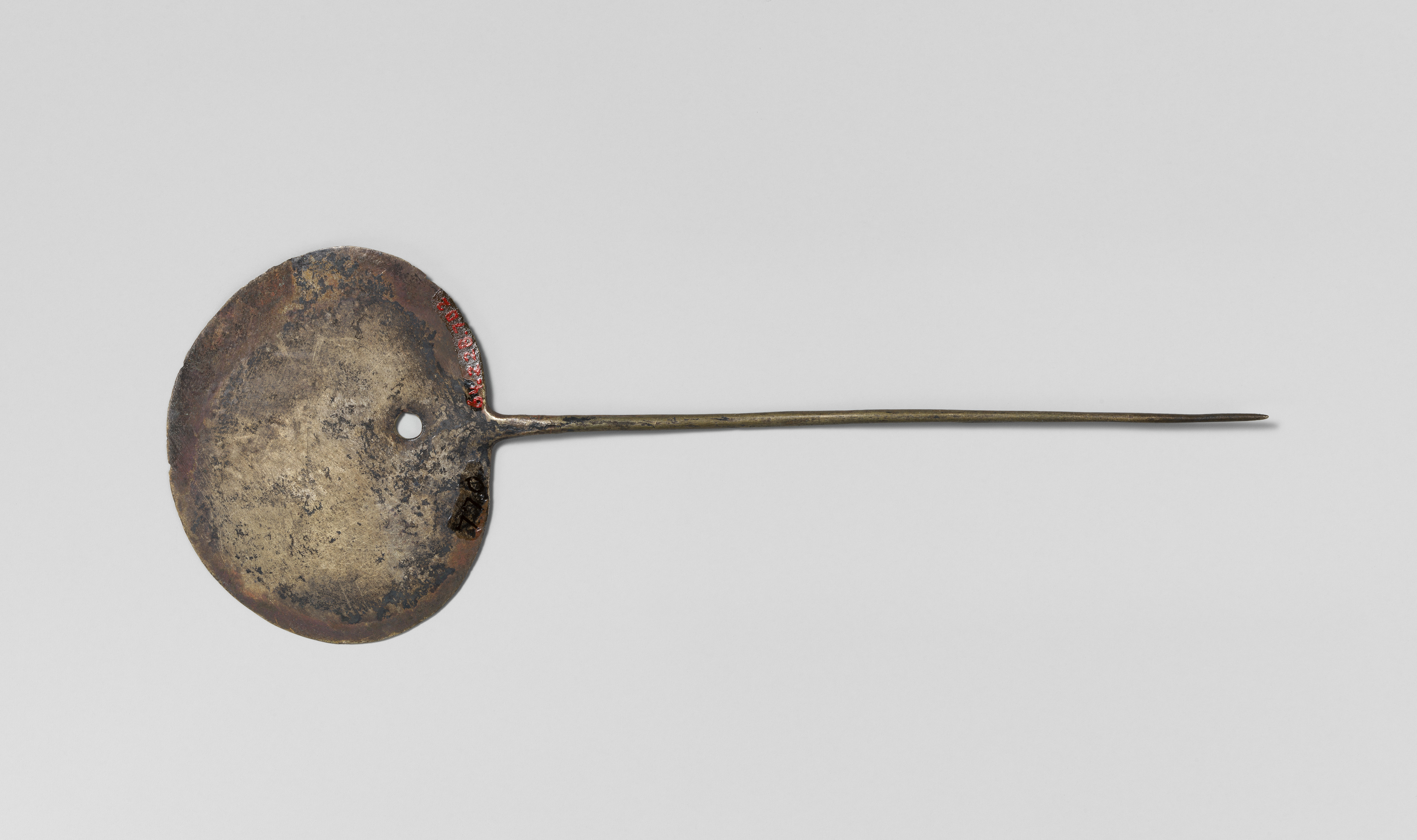
Tupu pin

Due to their longevity, tupu pins are not isolated to a single region of South America. Rather, their longevity and dispersion has allowed for tupu pins to be examined as products of their environment that evolved with their surroundings. Tupu pins can be identified by their unique shape which are made by hammering the selected metal to form the head and stem of the pin. The stem is long and sharp, made to be pierced through a traditional dress called an acsu with the aim of holding the fabric together at the front. The head of the pin is much flatter and is usually round or oval and often decorated with insignia or gems. The head may have a small hole that connects a string to the tupu pin to assure it will not get lost.

== Status ==
Practically used as a garment fastener and sometimes worn in pairs, the tupu pin also holds significant cultural importance. Clothing in the Andean region was an important marker of status and gender and was commonly worn with a small spindle. The metal the pins were made from was significant as women of higher status often wore tupu pins made of gold or silver, while the majority were most commonly made of copper.The discovery of tupu pins in archeological sites of noble women indicates that the metal accessories were vital markers of Inca female identity. The appearance and presence of these pins in a woman's wardrobe was often much more important than the functionality of them.

== Historical Context ==
Tupu pins are one of the only pieces of Andean costume that held its prominence and value following the Spanish Conquest. Upon arrival in Peru, garments and tapestries were greatly influenced by European practices. Metallic yarns were introduced and incorporated in making garments worn by elite Andean men and women. Although the arrival of the Spanish influenced the costumes worn by the Indigenous, many Andean women continued to use tupu pins. Traditional tupus have partial or full disks at the head of the pin and are usually around 11 inches long. To keep both pins together, they were secured with a metal chain or braided ribbon tied through a small hole in the middle of the disk.

== Prominence ==
Tupu pins also represent an important part of Andean society in terms of lineage and were often considered family heirlooms. Tupu pins were passed down from mother to daughter showcasing both female lineage and property. Used in marriage ceremonies as a gift and symbol of a union, the tupu has many connections within Andean society. In terms of class structure, women of higher status, and typically of noble lineages, wore tupu pins made from gold or silver in addition to feathers to signify their higher status and lineage within Andean society. Silver and gold were believed to have celestial ties in Andean culture and serve as important aspects of religion and tradition.

== Metal work ==
Metals were fabricated into a wide array of objects, including the tupu pin, by respected Andean artisans demonstrating how the tupu pin was not just a functional clothing pin, but rather a symbol of the vastness and connectedness of Andean society and their culture. The craft and trade of metals in South America, which are used to create and disperse items such as the tupu pin, has been greatly impacted as interactions with the Spanish began to increase. Prior to the Spanish conquest, tupu pins were usually left undecorated, reflecting on Inca aesthetics emphasizing clarity of form, balanced proportions, and clean outlines. Tupu pins made after the conquest combined Andean features with elements of Spanish culture. Many tupus adopted designs of shells on the disk of the pin, representing Christian implications of pilgrimages and signs of baptism. Eventually, tupus became primary vehicles for artistic expression and were prized by women. In extreme cases, tupu pins doubled as weapons against harassment.
