= Aguayo (cloth) =

Traditional Andean carrying cloth

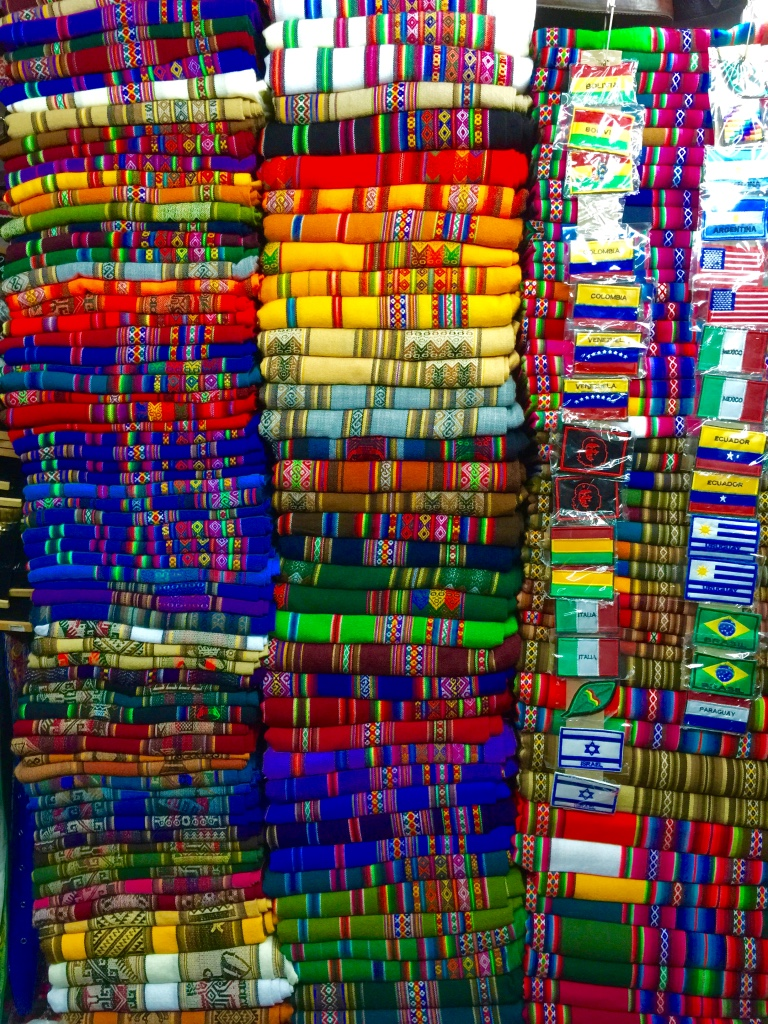
Traditional aguayos of different types and colors for sale at a crafts store in La Paz, Bolivia.

The aguayo (possibly from awayu, Aymara for diaper and for a woven blanket to carry things on the back or to cover the back), or also quepina (possibly from Quechua q'ipi bundle) is a rectangular carrying cloth used in traditional communities in the Andes region of Argentina, Bolivia, Chile, Colombia, Ecuador and Peru. Aymara and Quechua people use it to carry small children or various other items in it on their backs. It is similar to a lliklla and sometimes regarded as a synonym.

== Gallery ==
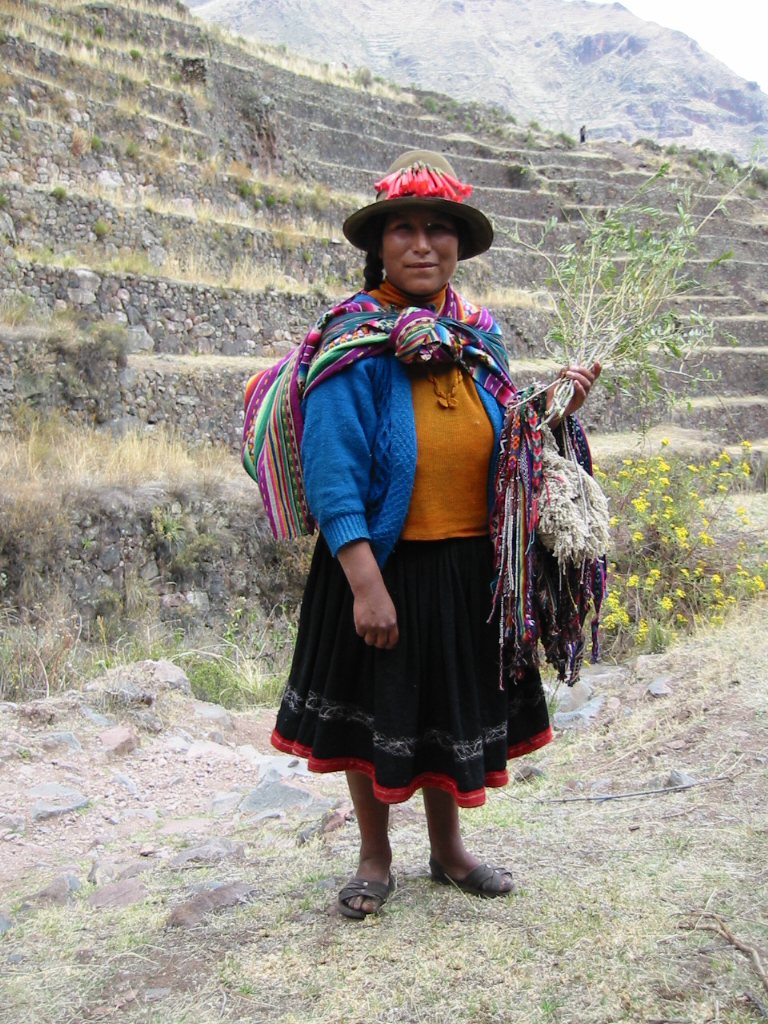
Quechua woman in Peru wearing a loaded aguayo

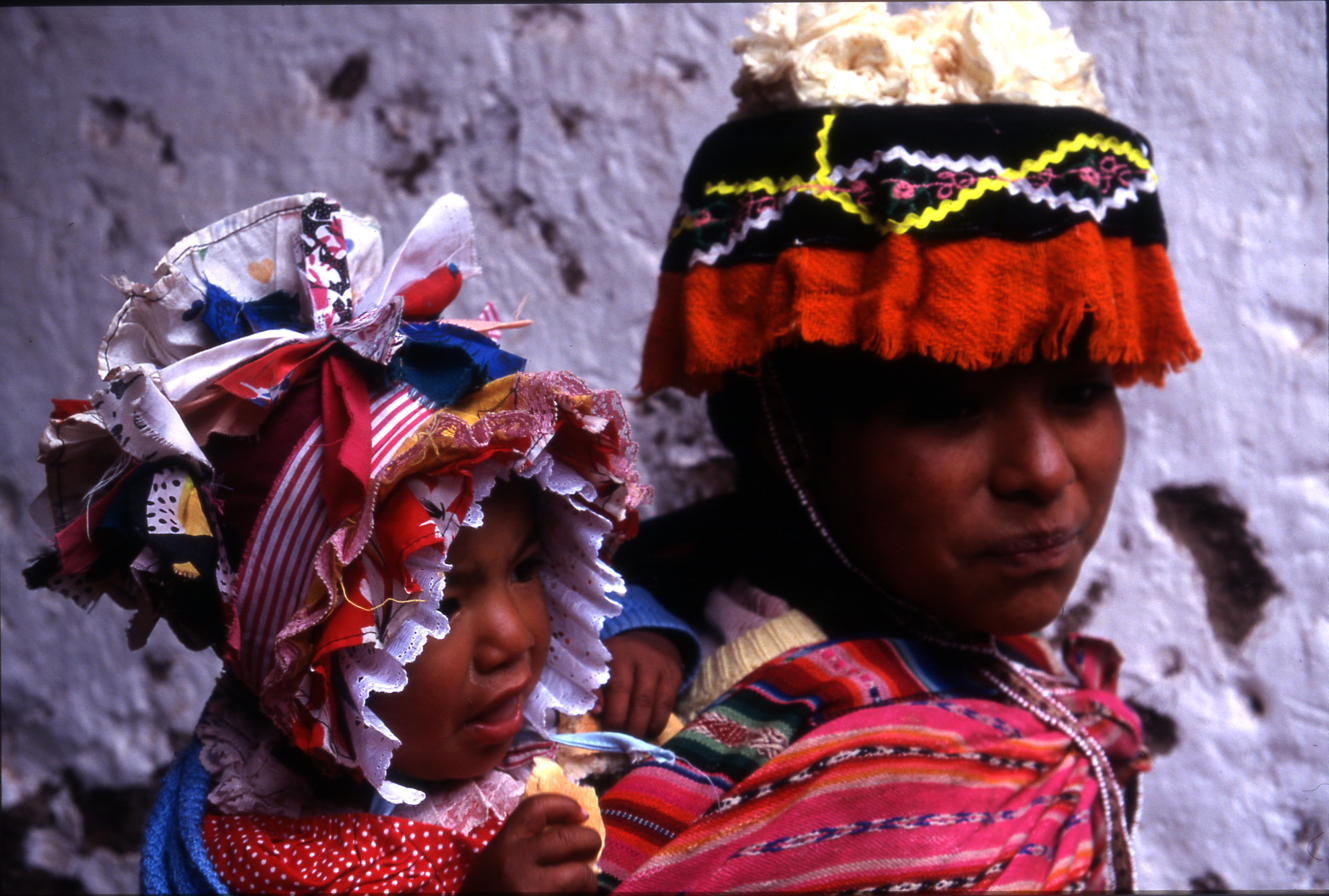
Quechua woman in Pisac, Peru, carrying a child in an aguayo

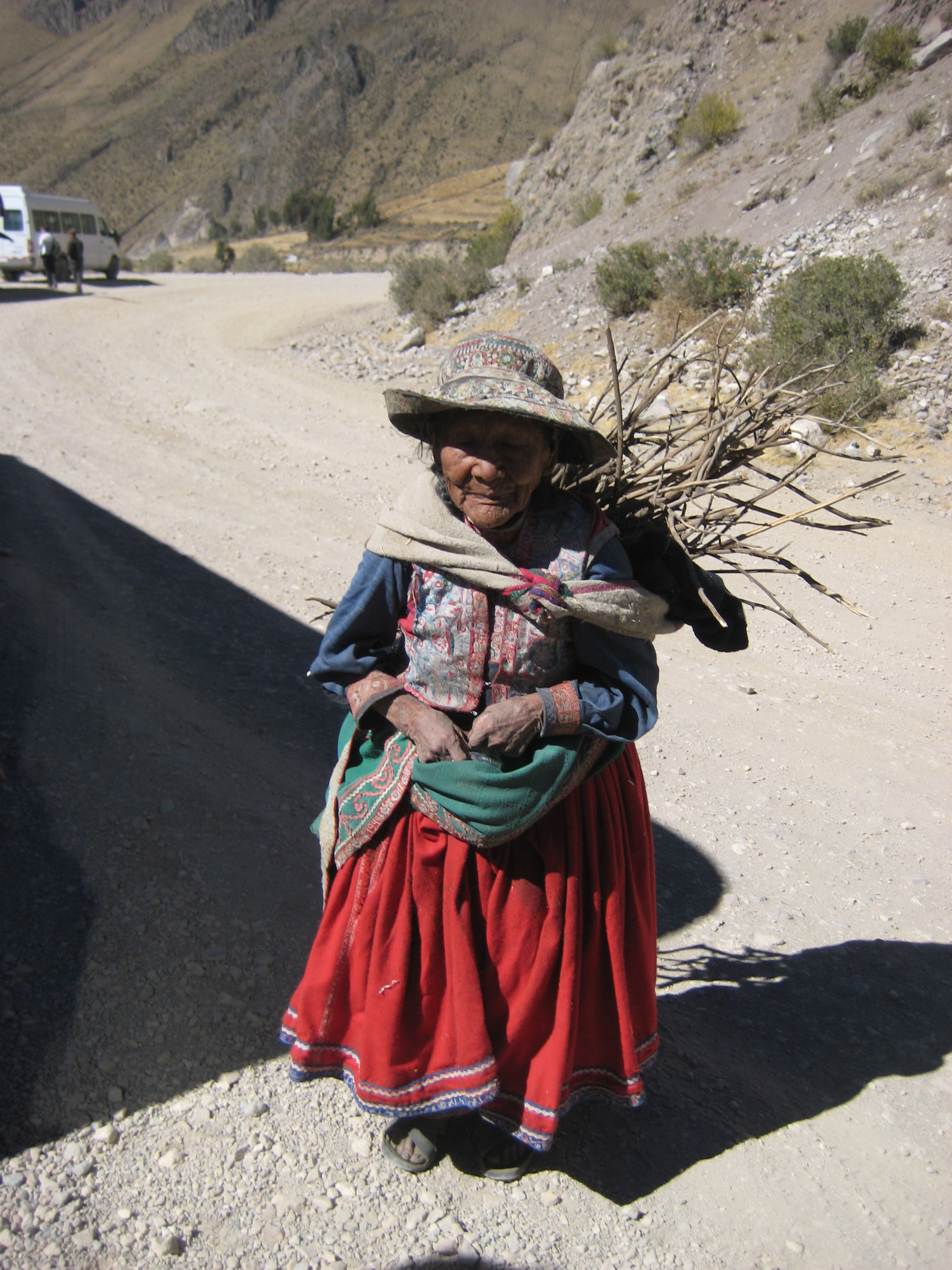
Quechua woman in Chivay, Peru, carrying wood in an aguayo

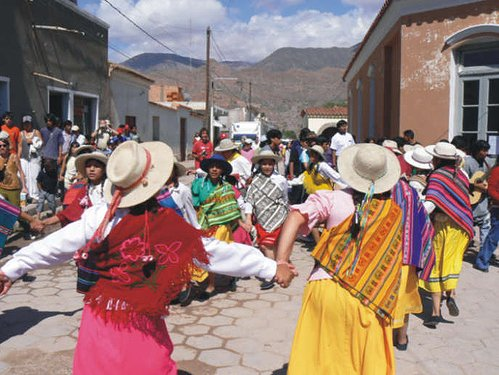
Women wearing aguayos while dancing the Carnavalito in Jujuy, Argentina

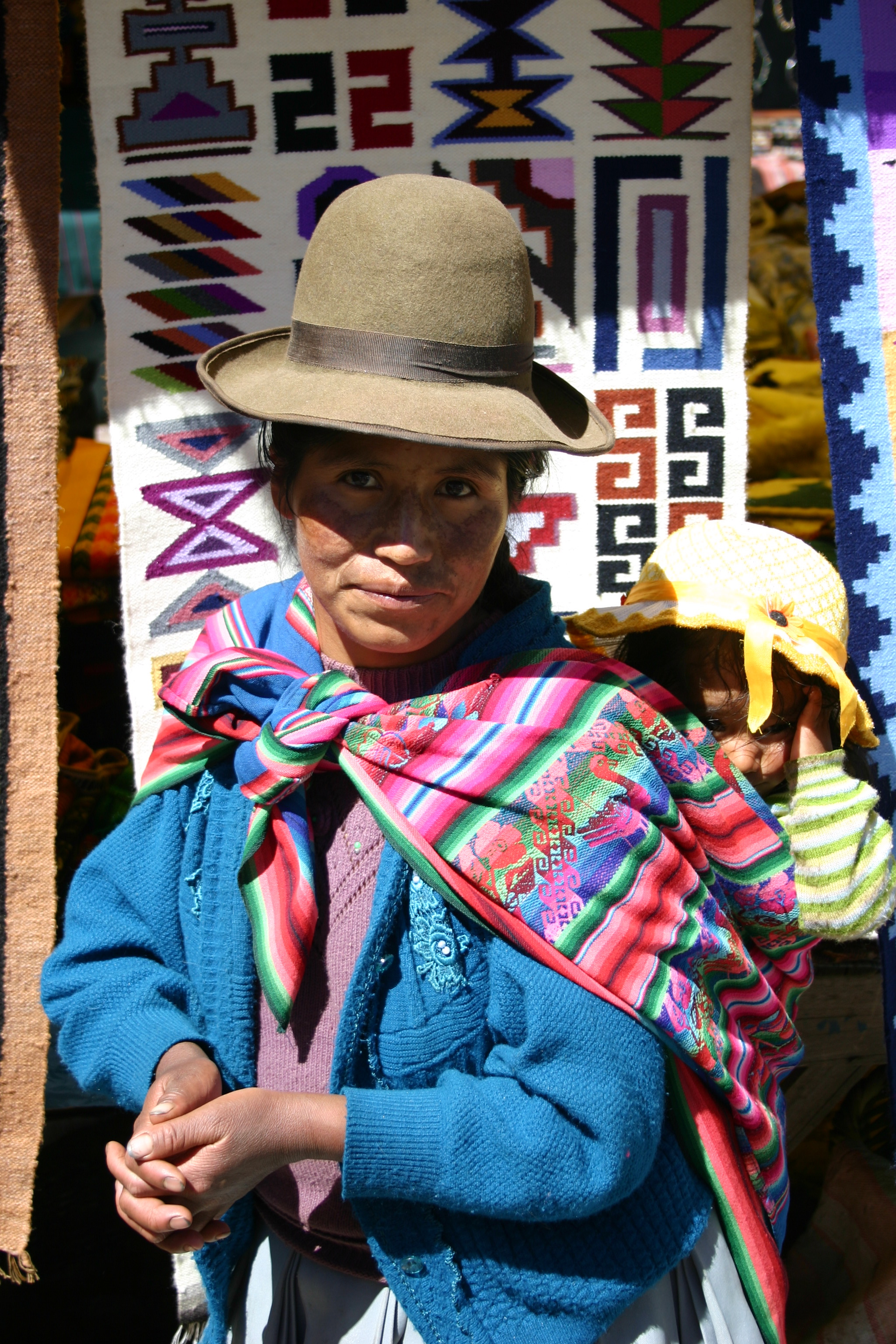
A Peruvian woman carrying a child in an aguayo

== See also ==
- Andean textiles
- Indigenous textile art of the Americas
- Poncho
- Rebozo, a similar piece of cloth used in Mexico
