= Lliklla =

Rectangular, handwoven shoulder cloth

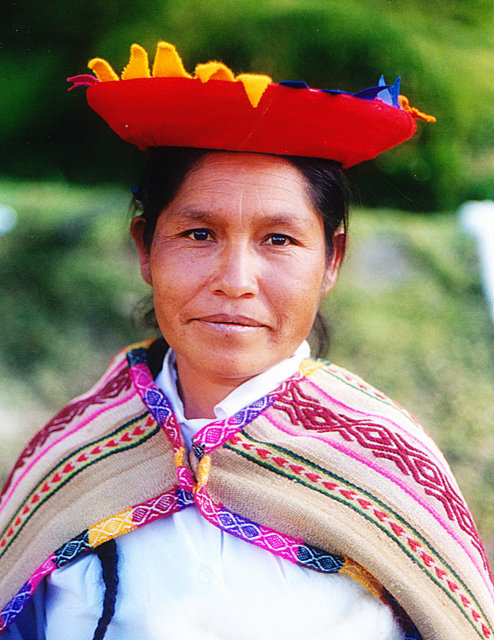
A Quechua woman of Peru wearing a lliklla around her shoulders

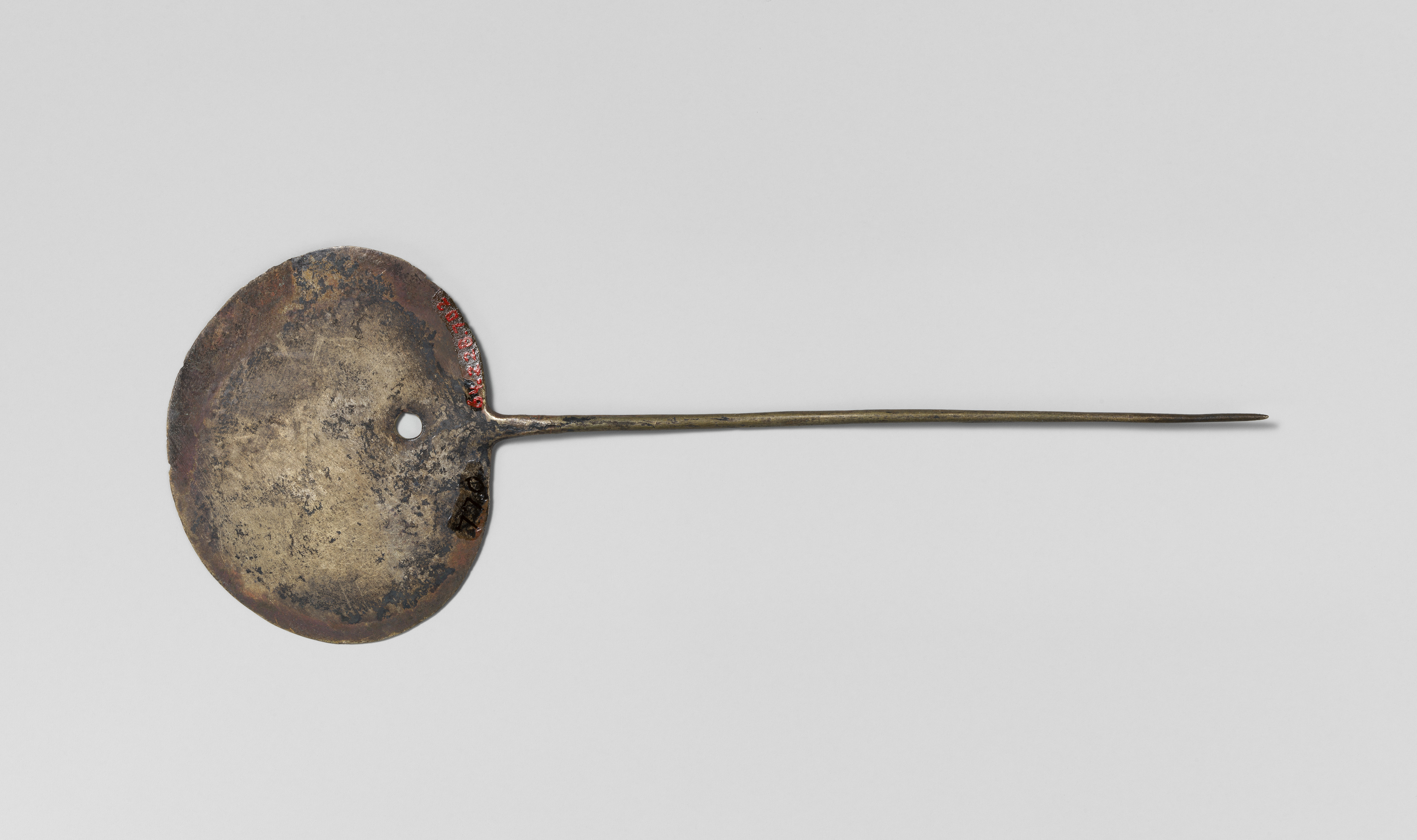
Tupu Pin before the 17th century

A lliklla (Quechua, hispanicized spellings liclla, llicla, lliclla) is a rectangular, handwoven shoulder cloth. It is worn by Quechua women of the Andes region in Bolivia and Peru. Traditionally it is fastened at the front using a decorated pin called tupu.

In the Quechua-speaking community of Chinchero, men and women wear distinctive garments that identify them by gender and their community. These garments are woven in two parts—symmetrical opposites that are sewn together. Wide blue bands called pampakuna, or fields, are set apart by multi-striped panels filled with colorful geometric designs. Typically, indigo-blue fields are characteristic of Chinchero women's garments.

A q'ipirina is similar to a lliklla but larger, worn over the back to carry small children or all sorts of products, and knotted at the front.

== Gallery ==
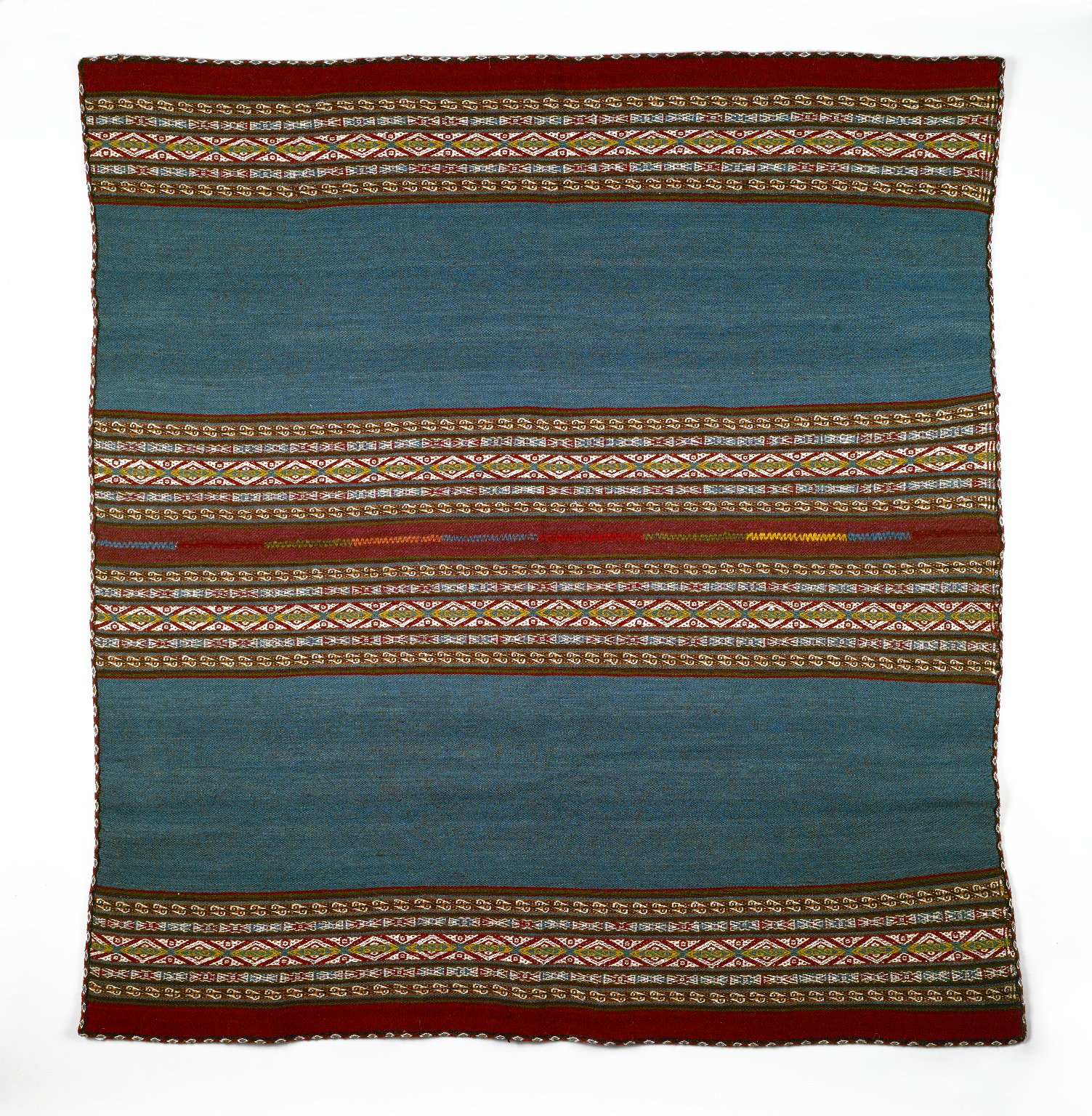
Woman's Shawl (Lliqlla), Brooklyn Museum

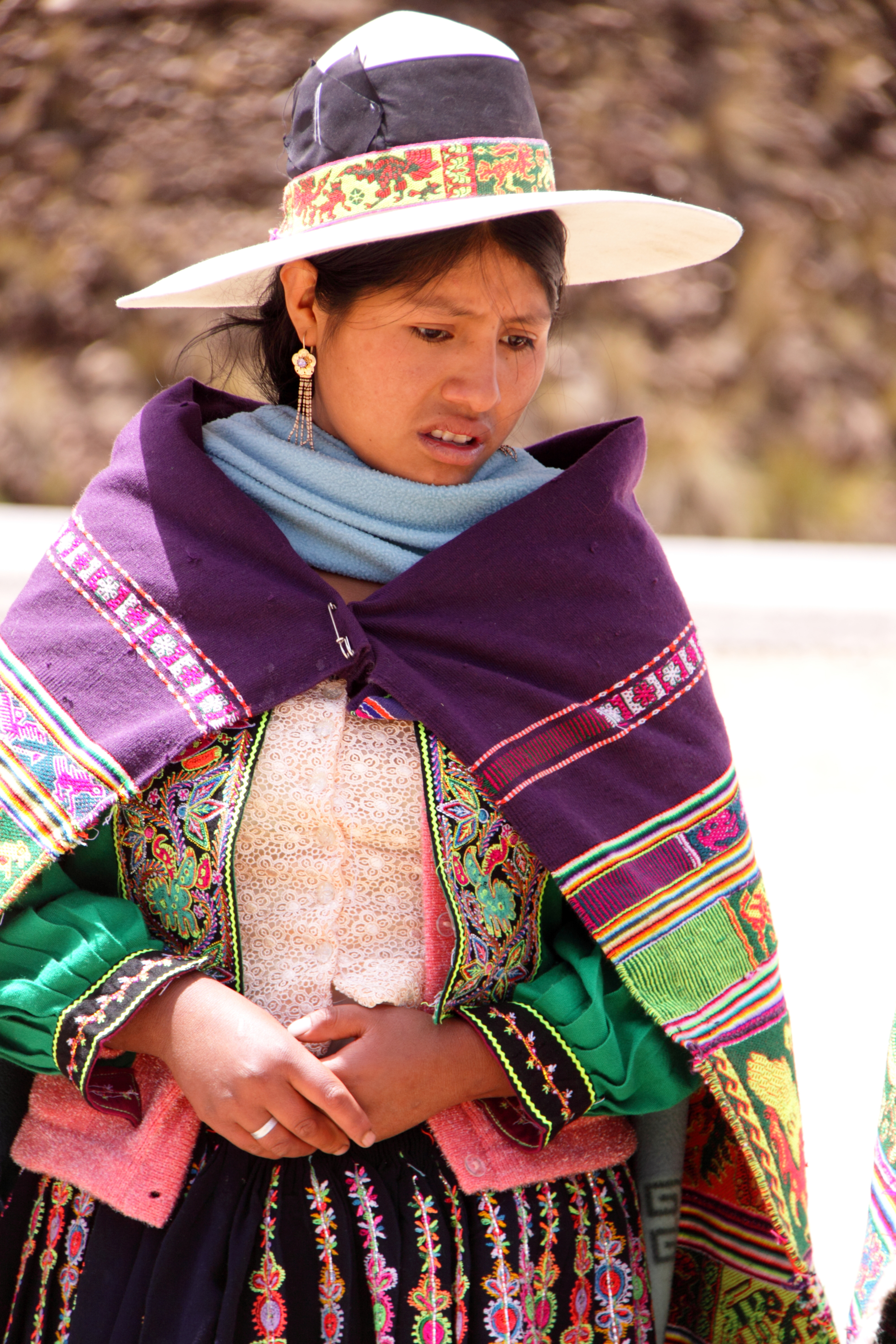
Quechua woman near Cochabamba, Bolivia, wearing a lliklla

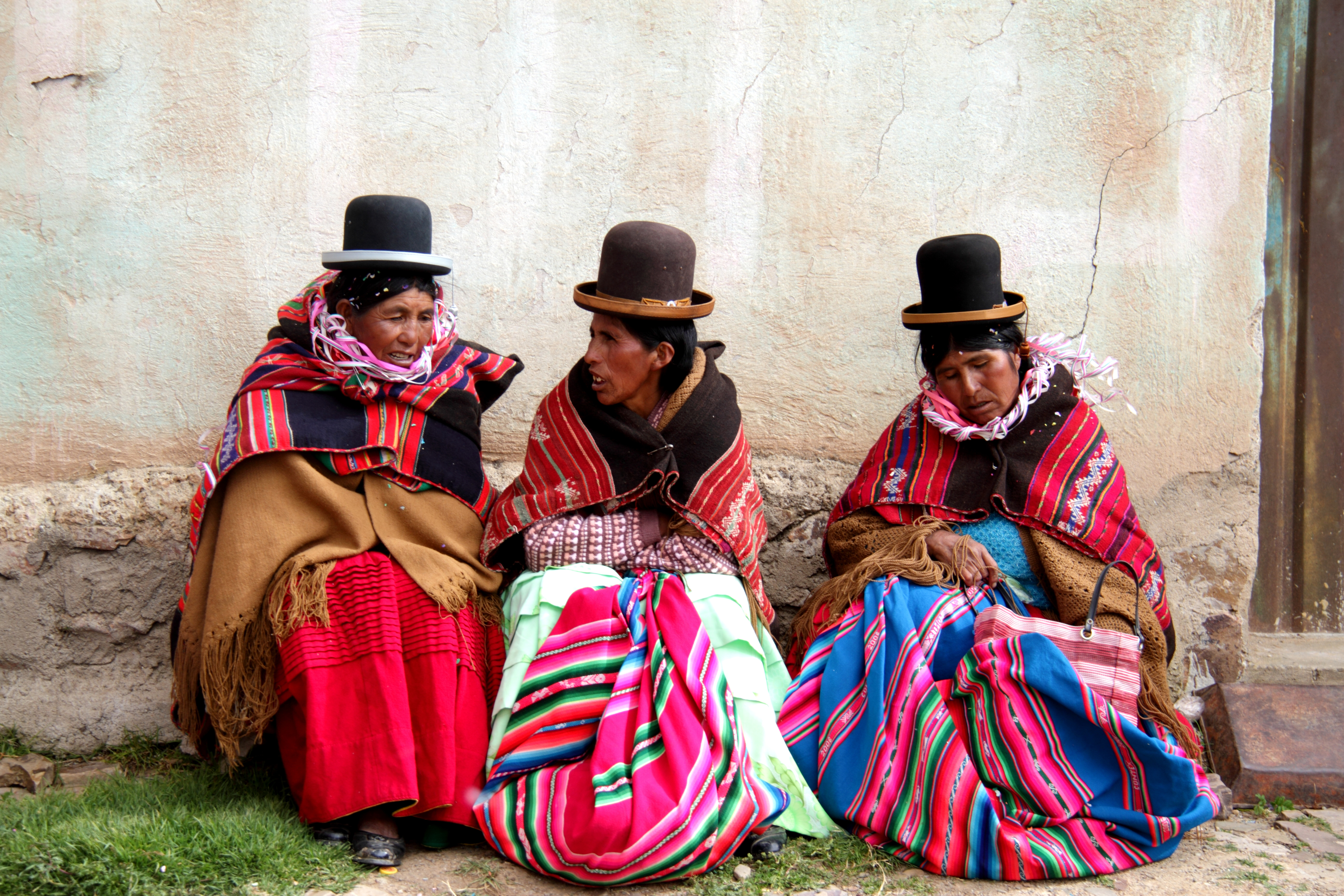
Women in the Bolivian Altiplano wearing llikllas

== See also ==
- Andean culture
