= Paucartambo province =

Coordinates: 13.319889°S 71.592751°W

Paucartambo
- Province
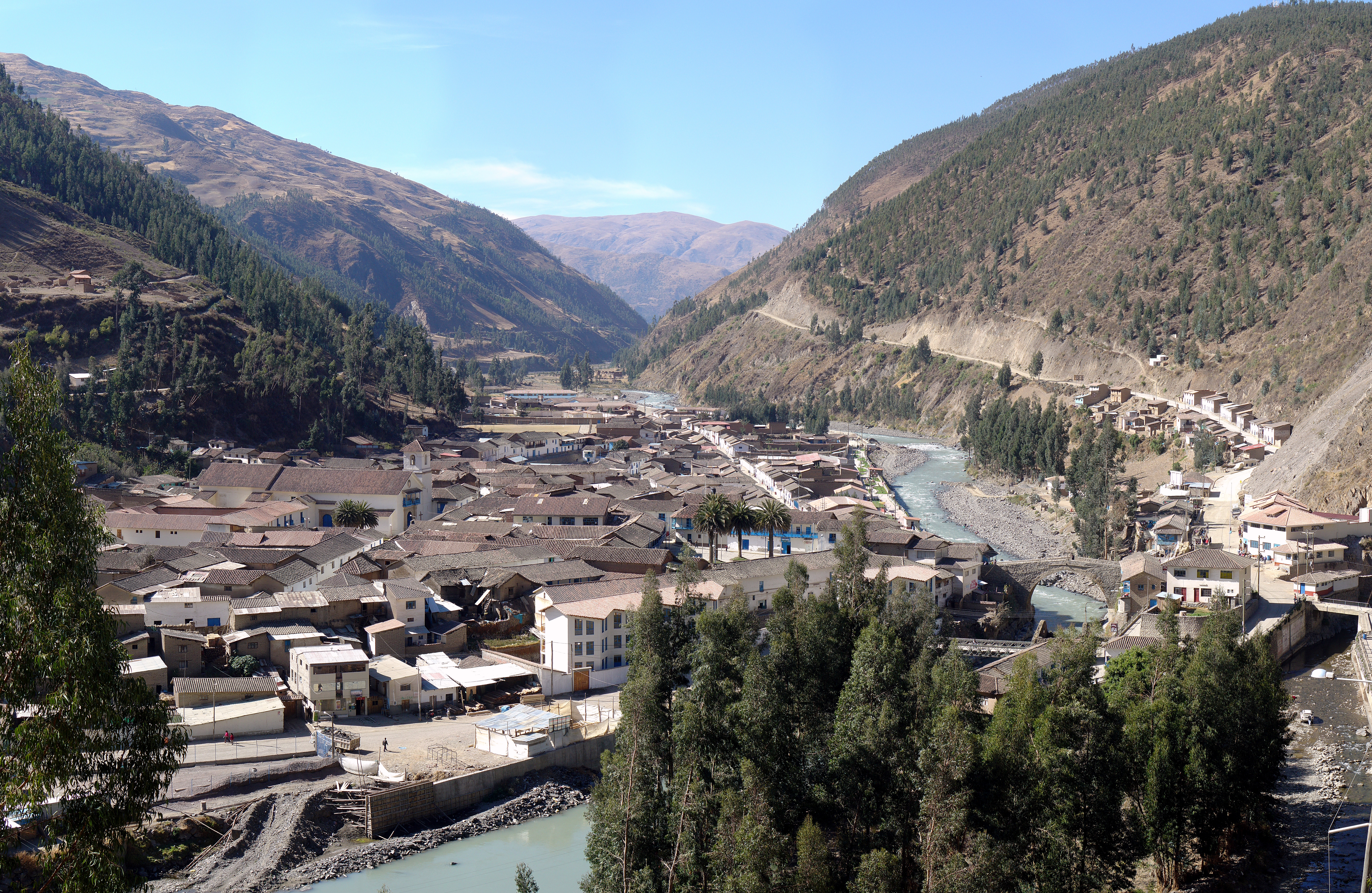
- Paucartambo

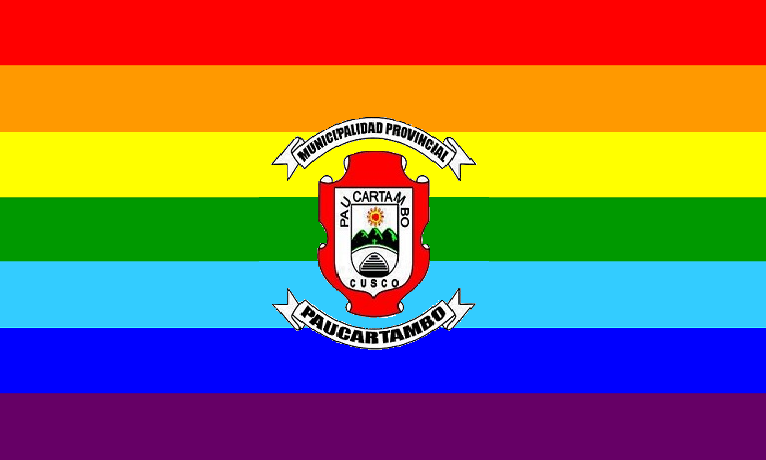
- Flag

- Location of Paucartambo in the Cusco Region
- Country: Peru
- Region: Cusco
- Capital: Paucartambo

Government
  - Mayor: Mario Condori Huallpa (2007)

Area
  - Total: 6,295.01 km^{2} (2,430.52 sq mi)

Population (2005 census)
  - Total: 47,313
  - Density: 7.5160/km^{2} (19.466/sq mi)
- UBIGEO: 0811

Paucartambo (from Quechua: Pawqar Tampu, meaning "colo(u)red tambo") is one of thirteen provinces in the Cusco Region in the southern highlands of Peru.

== Boundaries ==
- North: Madre de Dios Region
- East: province of Quispicanchi
- South: province of Quispicanchi
- West: province of Calca

== Geography ==
Some of the highest mountains in the province are listed below:

- Ananta Q'asa
- Anti Pukara
- Apachita Q'asa
- Aqu Urqu
- Atuq Wachana
- Chawpi Urqu
- Chupa Kancha
- Hatun Allpapata
- Inti Qhawarina
- Jach'a Sira
- Kuntur Sinqa
- Luychu Urqu
- Llama Kunka
- Minasniyuq
- Pukara
- Pukara Q'asa
- Pumakancha
- P'allqa Qaqa
- P'unquchayuq
- Qhispi Rumiyuq
- Qullpa Qhata
- Qullqi Urquna
- Qullqip'unqu
- Qullqiri
- Quri
- Q'illu Unuyuq
- Raqch'i Raqch'iyuq
- Saywa Urqu
- Suni Urqu
- Tawa Pukara
- Tawqa
- Uqayuq
- Wankarani
- Willulluni
- Yana Urqu

== Political division ==
The province is divided into six districts (Spanish: distritos, singular: distrito), each of which is headed by a mayor (alcalde). The districts, with their capitals in parentheses, are:

- Caicay (Caicay)
- Challabamba (Challabamba)
- Colquepata (Colquepata)
- Huancarani (Huancarani)
- Kosñipata (Pillcopata)
- Paucartambo (Paucartambo)

== Ethnic groups ==
The people in the province are mainly indigenous citizens of Quechua ethnicity. According to the 2007 national census, Quechua is the first language of the great majority of the population (85.56%); 13.51% of the residents learned Spanish as their first language (2007 Peru Census).

== See also ==
- Chukchu
- Ch'unchu
- Ninamarka
- Qhapaq negro
- Qhapaq Qulla
- Saqra
