= Paucartambo, Paucartambo =

Paucartambo Pawqar Tampu
- Town
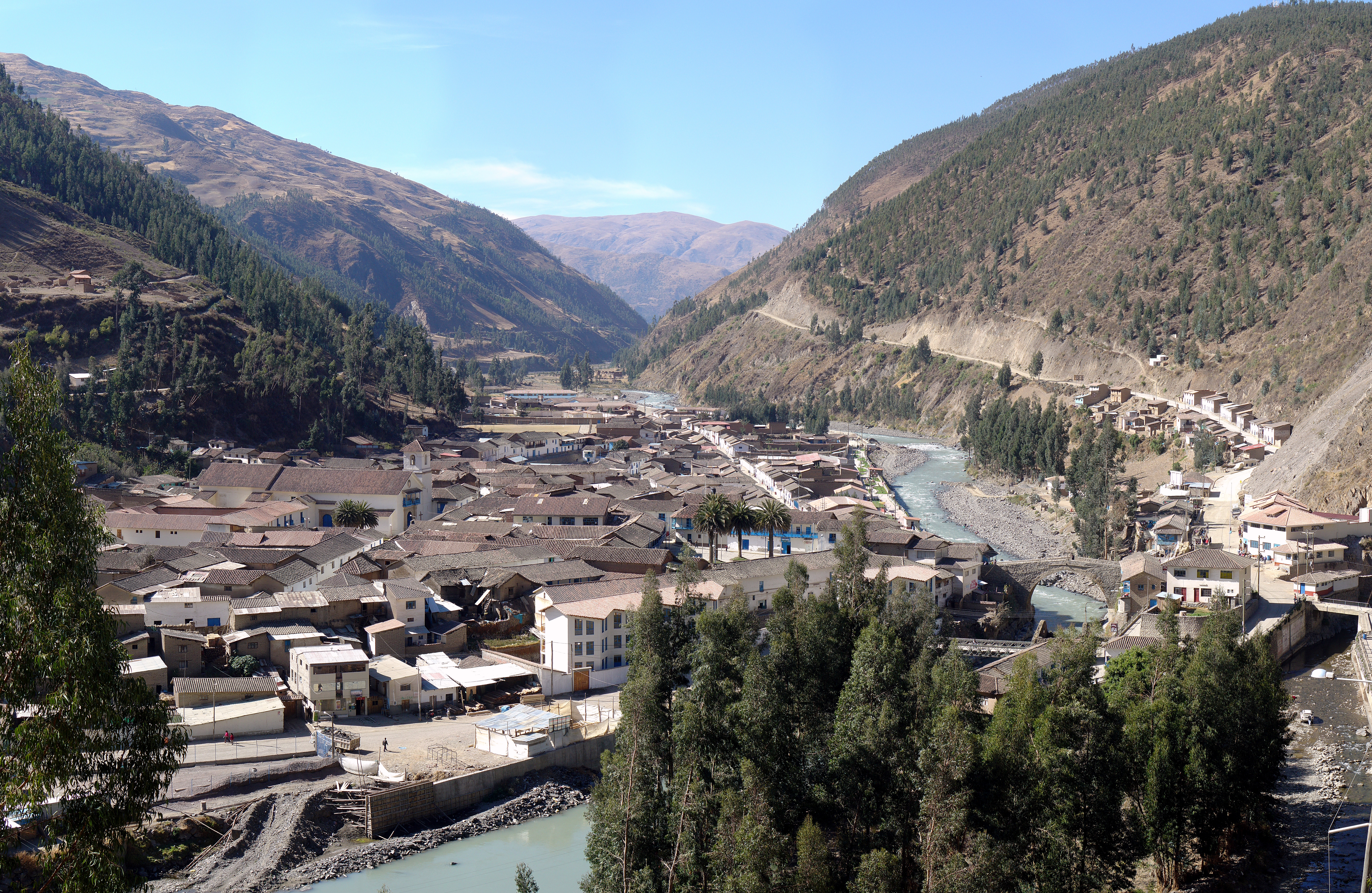
- Panorama of Paucartambo

- Location within Peru
- Coordinates: 13°18′56″S 71°35′30″W
- Country: Peru
- Region: Cusco
- Province: Paucartambo
- District: Paucartambo

Government
  - Mayor: Mario Condori Huallpa
- Elevation: 2,906 m (9,534 ft)
- Time zone: UTC-5 (PET)

Paucartambo (from Quechua: Pawqar Tampu, meaning "colored tambo") is a town in Southern Peru, capital of the province Paucartambo in the region Cusco. Paucartambo is home to the colourful Virgen del Carmen festival (Our Lady of Mount Carmel), held each 16 July. Paucartambo's three-day Fiesta de la Virgen del Carmen is one of the biggest street parties in Peru, and attracts tens of thousands of travellers, almost all Peruvian, each year.

== Climate ==
Climate data for Paucartambo, elevation 2,931 m (9,616 ft), (1991–2020)
Month	Jan	Feb	Mar	Apr	May	Jun	Jul	Aug	Sep	Oct	Nov	Dec	Year
Mean daily maximum °C (°F)	20.4 (68.7)	20.4 (68.7)	20.7 (69.3)	21.3 (70.3)	21.8 (71.2)	21.8 (71.2)	21.6 (70.9)	21.4 (70.5)	21.3 (70.3)	21.3 (70.3)	21.6 (70.9)	20.9 (69.6)	21.2 (70.2)
Mean daily minimum °C (°F)	9.2 (48.6)	9.3 (48.7)	8.9 (48.0)	7.9 (46.2)	6.3 (43.3)	5.1 (41.2)	4.3 (39.7)	5.0 (41.0)	6.6 (43.9)	7.9 (46.2)	8.7 (47.7)	9.2 (48.6)	7.4 (45.3)
Average precipitation mm (inches)	125.8 (4.95)	124.6 (4.91)	97.9 (3.85)	40.5 (1.59)	11.7 (0.46)	8.0 (0.31)	9.8 (0.39)	16.3 (0.64)	14.3 (0.56)	43.4 (1.71)	47.6 (1.87)	95.6 (3.76)	635.5 (25)
Source: National Meteorology and Hydrology Service of Peru

== See also ==
- Chukchu
- Ch'unchu
- Qhapaq negro
- Qhapaq Qulla
- Saqra
- Yavero River
