= Huaypun =

Mountain in Peru

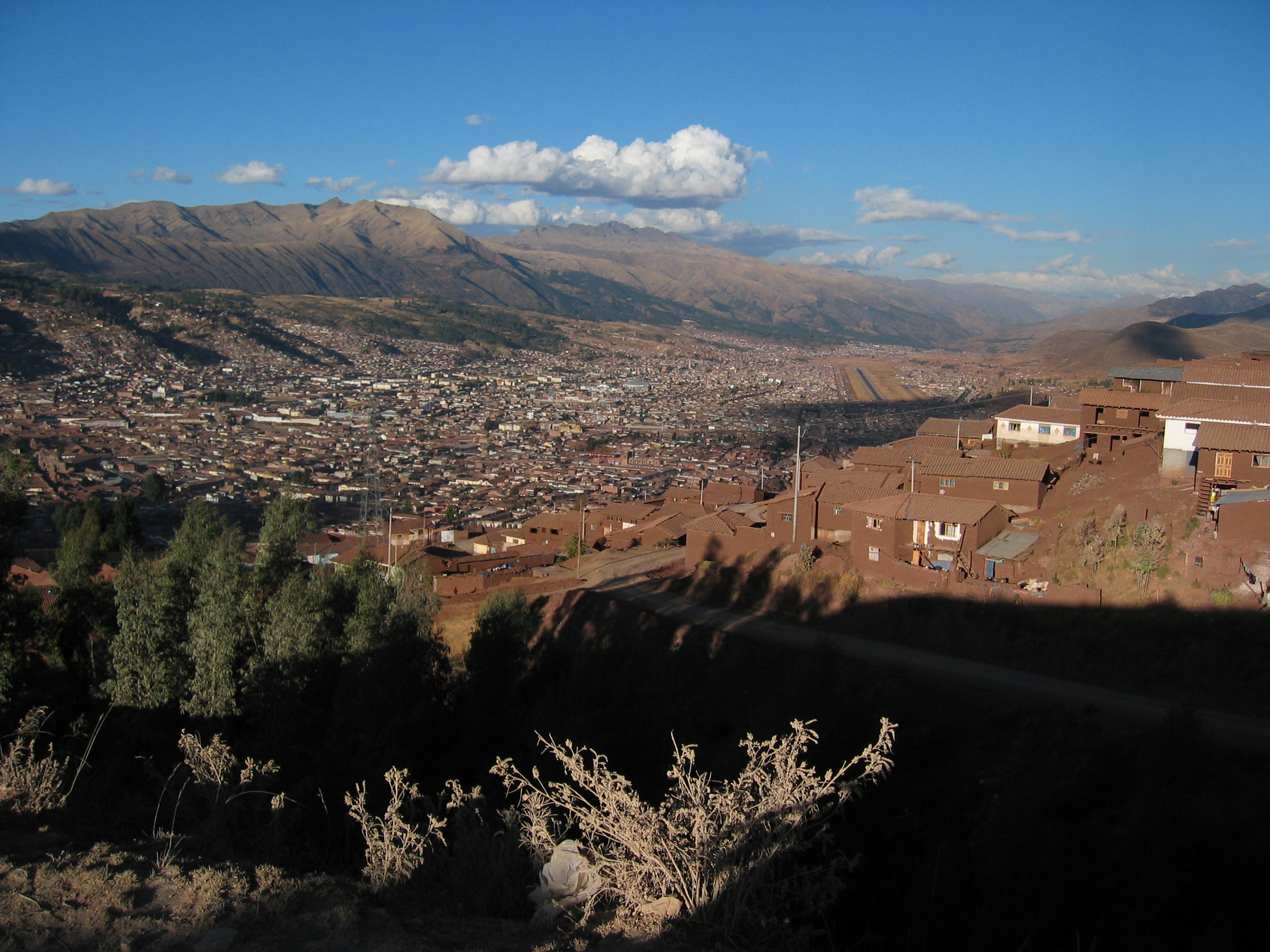
- Cusco with the mountains Pillku Urqu (on the left), Pachatusan (center) and Huaypun in the background

Highest point
- Elevation: 4,200 m (13,800 ft)
- Coordinates: 13°32′54″S 71°45′42″W

Naming
- Language of name: Quechua

Geography
- Location within Peru
- Location: Peru, Cusco Region, Calca Province
- Parent range: Andes

Huaypun (possibly from Quechua waypu a name applied for different species of Tinamidae, Nothoprocta pentlandii, Rhynchotus rufescens and Rhynchotus maculicollis, -n a suffix) is a mountain in the Cusco Region in Peru, about 4,200 metres (13,780 ft) high. It is situated in the Calca Province, San Salvador District, and in the Quispicanchi Province, Oropesa District. Huaypun lies on the western bank of the Vilcanota River, southeast of Pachatusan and southwest of Tauja.

== See also ==
- Pumacancha
- Curi
