= Tauja =

Mountain in Peru

- Tauja (on the left) and the Vilcanota valley as seen from the northwest

Highest point
- Elevation: 4,039.8 m (13,254 ft)
- Coordinates: 13°32′4″S 71°43′15″W

Naming
- Language of name: Quechua

Geography
- Location within Peru
- Location: Peru, Cusco Region, Calca Province, Paucartambo Province
- Parent range: Andes

Tauja (possibly from Quechua for heap, pile,) is a 4,039.8-metre-high (13,254 ft) mountain in the Cusco Region in Peru. It is situated in the Calca Province, San Salvador District, and in the Paucartambo Province, Caicay District, northeast of Huaypun. The Vilcanota River flows around its southern and western slopes. In the east the mountain is bordered by the Huancamayo (possibly from Quechua for "stone river"). It is a right tributary of the Vilcanota River. The confluence is south of the mountain.

== See also ==
- Pachatusan
- Pumacancha
- Curi
