= Qullqiri =

Kunturi (Aymara qullqi silver, ri a suffix, Hispanicized spellings Collquere, Collqueri, Collquire, Collquiri, Colquere, Colquiri) may refer to:

- Qullqiri (Arequipa), a mountain in the Arequipa Region, Peru
- Qullqiri (Cusco), a mountain in the Cusco Region, Peru
- Colquiri, a town in the La Paz Department, Bolivia
- Colquiri Municipality, a municipality in the La Paz Department, Bolivia
