= Wankarani =

Wankarani (Aymara wankara a kind of drum, -ni a suffix to indicate ownership, "the one with a drum", Hispanicized spellings Huancarane, Huancarani) may refer to:

- Wankarani culture existed during c. 1500 BC – AD 400 in the highlands of Bolivia
- Wankarani (Bolivia), a mountain in Bolivia
- Wankarani (Lampa), a mountain in the Lampa Province, Puno Region, Peru
- Wankarani (Puno), a mountain in the Puno Province, Puno Region, Peru
- Huancarani District, a district in Peru
