= P'unquchayuq =

Mountain in Peru

- Location within Peru

Highest point
- Elevation: 4,400 m (14,400 ft)
- Coordinates: 13°29′10″S 71°43′58″W

Naming
- Language of name: Quechua

Geography
- Location: Peru, Cusco Region
- Parent range: Andes

P'unquchayuq (Quechua p'unqu pond, reservoir, tank; dam, -cha, -yuq suffixes, "the one with a little pond (or dam)", Hispanicized spelling Puncuchayoc) is a mountain in the Cusco Region in Peru, about 4,400 metres (14,436 ft) high. It is situated in the Calca Province, San Salvador District, and in the Paucartambo Province, Caicay District. P'unquchayuq lies south of Hatun Punta and southeast of Qhiwar.
