= Caicay District =

Coordinates: 13.5981°S 71.6968°W

Caicay
- District
- Interactive map of Caicay
- Country: Peru
- Region: Cusco
- Province: Paucartambo
- Capital: Caicay

Government
  - Mayor: Ortencia Cuadros Torres

Area
  - Total: 110.72 km^{2} (42.75 sq mi)
- Elevation: 3,100 m (10,200 ft)

Population (2005 census)
  - Total: 2,789
  - Density: 25.19/km^{2} (65.24/sq mi)
- Time zone: UTC-5 (PET)
- UBIGEO: 081102

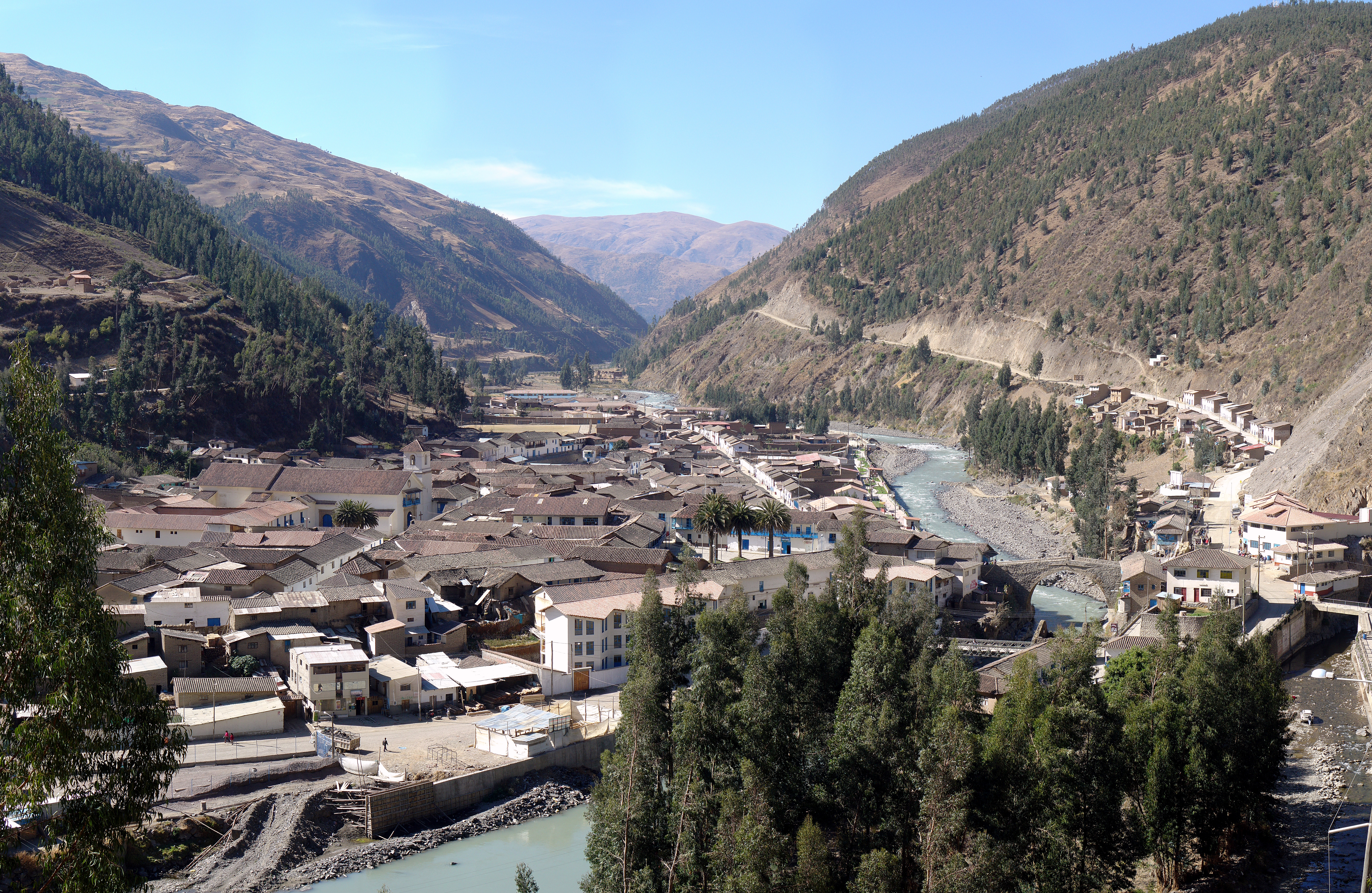
Panorama of the city of Paucartambo, Peru.

Caicay District is one of six districts of the province Paucartambo in Peru.

== Geography ==
The most important river of the district is the Willkanuta which flows along the western border of the district.

== Ethnic groups ==
The people in the district are mainly indigenous citizens of Quechua descent. Quechua is the language which the majority of the population (86.07%) learnt to speak in childhood, 13.32% of the residents started speaking using the Spanish language (2007 Peru Census).

== Climate ==
Climate data for Caicay, elevation 3,117 m (10,226 ft), (1991–2020)
Month	Jan	Feb	Mar	Apr	May	Jun	Jul	Aug	Sep	Oct	Nov	Dec	Year
Mean daily maximum °C (°F)	21.2 (70.2)	21.0 (69.8)	21.3 (70.3)	22.7 (72.9)	22.7 (72.9)	22.5 (72.5)	22.2 (72.0)	22.6 (72.7)	22.6 (72.7)	22.3 (72.1)	22.9 (73.2)	21.6 (70.9)	22.1 (71.9)
Mean daily minimum °C (°F)	8.3 (46.9)	8.7 (47.7)	8.3 (46.9)	6.9 (44.4)	4.3 (39.7)	2.7 (36.9)	2.0 (35.6)	3.6 (38.5)	6.1 (43.0)	7.3 (45.1)	8.1 (46.6)	8.4 (47.1)	6.2 (43.2)
Average precipitation mm (inches)	108.8 (4.28)	106.9 (4.21)	84.0 (3.31)	25.5 (1.00)	5.5 (0.22)	4.8 (0.19)	5.5 (0.22)	5.5 (0.22)	8.2 (0.32)	35.6 (1.40)	52.4 (2.06)	92.2 (3.63)	534.9 (21.06)
Source: National Meteorology and Hydrology Service of Peru

== See also ==
- Pumakancha
- P'unquchayuq
- Quri
- Tawqa
