= Colquepata District =

Coordinates: 13.3761°S 71.6816°W

Colquepata Qullqi Pata
- District
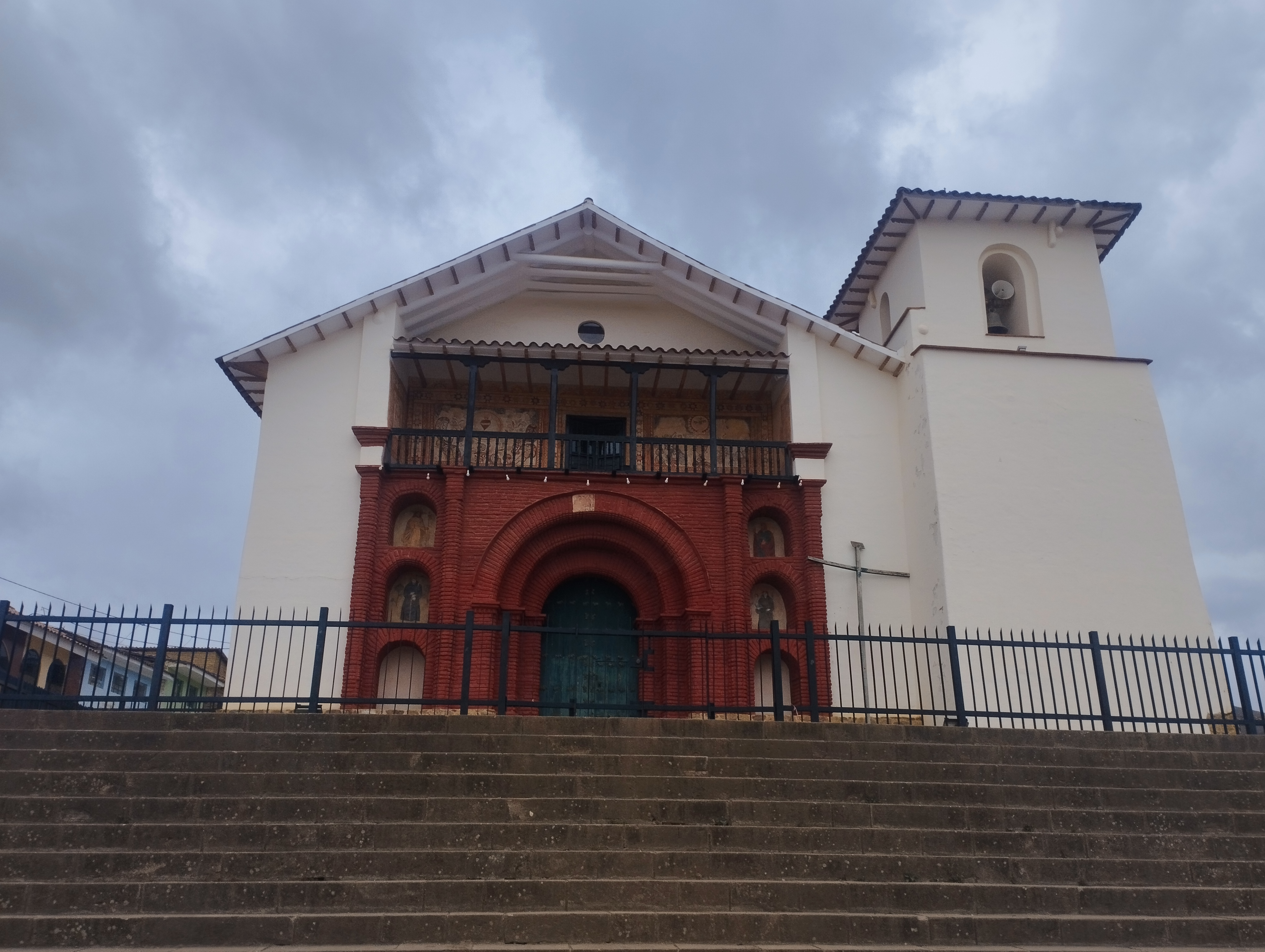
- Templo Colonial San Jerónimo de Colquepata
- Interactive map of Colquepata; Qullqi Pata
- Country: Peru
- Region: Cusco
- Province: Paucartambo
- Founded: January 2, 1857
- Capital: Colquepata

Government
  - Mayor: Hilario Hancco Flores

Area
  - Total: 467.68 km^{2} (180.57 sq mi)
- Elevation: 3,679 m (12,070 ft)

Population (2005 census)
  - Total: 10,086
  - Density: 21.566/km^{2} (55.856/sq mi)
- Time zone: UTC-5 (PET)
- UBIGEO: 081104

The Colquepata District is one of six districts of the province Paucartambo in Peru.

== Geography ==
One of the highest peaks of the district is Luychu Urqu at 4,430 m (14,530 ft). Other mountains are listed below:

- Chillawa
- Chupa Kancha
- Chuqllu Urqu
- Hatun Paqu Urqu
- Hatun Urqu
- Hatun Wayllarani
- Ichhuyuq
- Kuntur Sinqa
- Kusa Rumiyuq
- Llama Kunka
- Misa Rumiyuq
- Pata Kancha
- Pikchu
- Qullpa Qhata
- Qullpa Q'asa
- Qullqi Urquna
- Qullqiri
- Quncha Pallana
- Q'illu Unuyuq
- Raqch'i Raqch'iyuq
- Rumi Q'asa
- Runku Tawqa
- Suni Urqu
- Suysuwa
- Taruka Marka
- Waka Kancha
- Wankarani
- Waqutu
- Waqutuyuq

== Ethnic groups ==
The people in the district are mainly indigenous citizens of Quechua descent. Quechua is the language which the majority of the population (97.87%) learnt to speak in childhood, 1.74 % of the residents started speaking using the Spanish language (2007 Peru Census).

== Climate ==
Climate data for Colquepata, elevation 3,696 m (12,126 ft), (1991–2020)
Month	Jan	Feb	Mar	Apr	May	Jun	Jul	Aug	Sep	Oct	Nov	Dec	Year
Mean daily maximum °C (°F)	15.9 (60.6)	15.8 (60.4)	16.3 (61.3)	16.9 (62.4)	17.4 (63.3)	17.4 (63.3)	17.0 (62.6)	17.4 (63.3)	17.3 (63.1)	17.2 (63.0)	17.5 (63.5)	16.6 (61.9)	16.9 (62.4)
Mean daily minimum °C (°F)	5.4 (41.7)	5.6 (42.1)	5.4 (41.7)	4.7 (40.5)	3.6 (38.5)	2.4 (36.3)	1.6 (34.9)	2.1 (35.8)	3.4 (38.1)	4.5 (40.1)	5.1 (41.2)	5.4 (41.7)	4.1 (39.4)
Average precipitation mm (inches)	116.0 (4.57)	106.3 (4.19)	89.7 (3.53)	33.2 (1.31)	12.3 (0.48)	7.0 (0.28)	9.1 (0.36)	11.9 (0.47)	12.7 (0.50)	39.8 (1.57)	43.3 (1.70)	90.4 (3.56)	571.7 (22.52)
Source: National Meteorology and Hydrology Service of Peru

== Comunidades ==
- Ninamarka
- Tocra
- Mashuay
- Huallhua
- Rayancancha
- Huacapunco
- Mamasamana
- Soncco
- Sipascancha
- Sipascancha Alta
- Choccopia
- Huarancca
- Inkacancha
- Miscahuara
- Chicchicmarca
- Roquechiri
- Roquepata
- Paucona
- Umasbamba
- Pacpapata
- San Juan De Buenavista
- Sayllaccalla
- Ccotañe
- Accha
- Pichigua
- Ñahuinpugio
- Mesapallpa
- Sayllapata
- Pumapaccha
- Mikaypata
- Cotatoclla
- Mika
- Kucya
- Huatocto
- Incapaucar Aire
- Accha Alta
- Vizcochoni
- Tupac Amaru De Kurpo
