= Pukara (Cusco) =

Mountain in Peru

- Location within Peru

Highest point
- Elevation: 3,880 m (12,730 ft)
- Coordinates: 13°12′15″S 71°39′16″W

Naming
- Language of name: Quechua

Geography
- Location: Peru, Cusco Region, Paucartambo Province
- Parent range: Andes

Pukara (Quechua for fortress, Hispanicized spelling Pucará) is a mountain in the Cusco Region in Peru, about 3,880 metres (12,730 ft) high. It is situated in the Paucartambo Province, Challabamba District, west of Challabamba.
