= Qhispi Rumiyuq (Paucartambo) =

Mountain in Peru

- Location within Peru

Highest point
- Elevation: 4,059 m (13,317 ft)
- Coordinates: 13°18′10″S 71°38′19″W

Naming
- Language of name: Quechua

Geography
- Location: Peru, Cusco Region, Paucartambo Province
- Parent range: Andes

Qhispi Rumiyuq (Quechua qhispi rumi, obsidian (qhispi, q'ispi, qispi glass, transparent, rumi stone, literally glass stone or transparent stone), -yuq a suffix to indicate ownership, "the one with obsidian", Hispanicized spelling Quesperumiyoc) is a mountain in the Cusco Region in Peru, about 4,059 metres (13,317 ft) high. It is situated in the Paucartambo Province, Challabamba District, northwest of Paucartambo.
