= Wallwa Qhata =

Mountain in Peru

- Location within Peru

Highest point
- Elevation: 4,000 m (13,000 ft)
- Coordinates: 13°28′08″S 71°46′43″W

Naming
- Language of name: Quechua

Geography
- Location: Peru, Cusco Region
- Parent range: Andes

Wallwa Qhata (Quechua wallwa a medical plant (Psoralea glandulosa, Otholobium glandulosum), qhata slope, hillside, "wallwa slope", Hispanicized spelling Huallhuacata) is a mountain in the Cusco Region in Peru, about 4,000 metres (13,123 ft) high. It is situated in the Calca Province, San Salvador District. Wallwa Qhata lies on the right bank of the Willkanuta River. The village of Wallwa (Huallhua) is situated at its feet.
