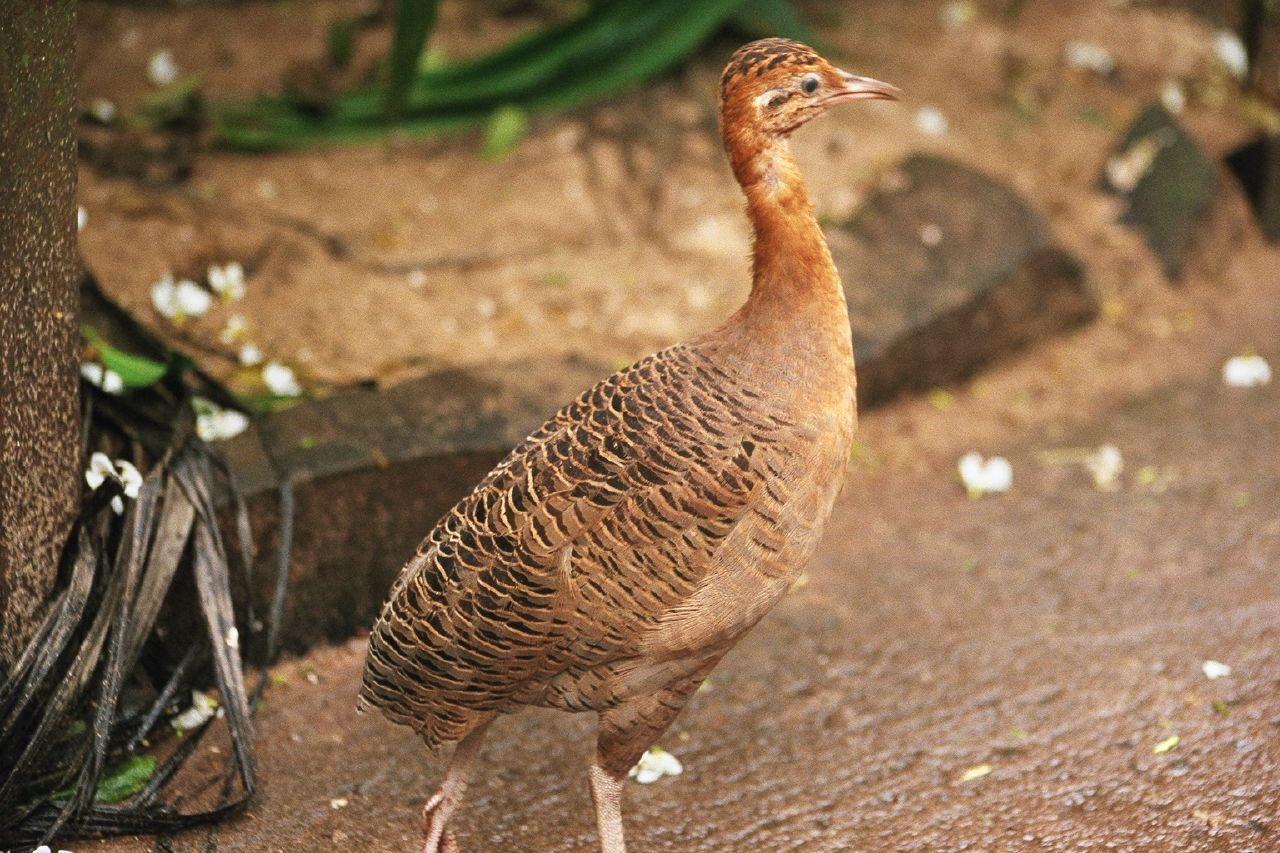
- At Parque das Aves, Brazil

Conservation status
- Least Concern (IUCN 3.1)

Scientific classification
- Kingdom: Animalia
- Phylum: Chordata
- Class: Aves
- Infraclass: Palaeognathae
- Order: Tinamiformes
- Family: Tinamidae
- Genus: Rhynchotus
- Species: R. rufescens

Binomial name
- Rhynchotus rufescens (Temminck, 1815)

Subspecies
- R. r. rufescens (Temminck, 1815); R. r. catingae (Reiser, 1905); R. r. pallescens (Kothe, 1907)

= Red-winged tinamou =

Species of bird

The red-winged tinamou (Rhynchotus rufescens) is a medium-sized ground-living bird from central and eastern South America. Other common names for the species include perdiz grande, rufous tinamou, and ynambu.

== Taxonomy ==
The red-winged tinamou was formally described in 1815 by the Dutch zoologist Coenraad Jacob Temminck under the binomial name Tinamus rufescens. Temminck based his account on the "Ynambu-guazu" from Brazil that had been described in 1805 by the Spanish naturalist Félix de Azara. The type locality was restricted to São Paulo in Brazil by Carl Eduard Hellmayr in 1929. The specific epithet rufescens is Latin meaning "reddish". The red-winged tinamou is now placed with the huayco tinamou in the genus Rhynchotus that was introduced in 1825 by Johann Baptist von Spix. Its common name refers to the bright rufous primaries, which mainly are visible in flight.

Three subspecies are recognised:

- R. r. catingae Reiser, 1905 – central, northeast Brazil
- R. r. pallescens Kothe, 1907 – northeast, central Argentina
- R. r. rufescens (Temminck, 1815) – north Bolivia to east Brazil, Paraguay, northeast Argentina and Uruguay

All tinamou are from the family Tinamidae, and in the larger scheme are also ratites. Unlike other ratites, tinamous can fly, although in general, they are not strong fliers. All ratites evolved from prehistoric flying birds, and tinamous are the closest living relative of these birds.

Previously, the taxon maculicollis was considered a subspecies of the red-winged tinamou, but following SACC it is now considered a species in its own right; the huayco tinamou.

== Description ==
The red-winged tinamou is 39–42.5 cm (15.4–16.7 in) in overall length. The male weighs 700–920 g (25–32 oz), the female is slightly heavier and weighs 815–1,040 g (28.7–36.7 oz). It has a black crown, rufous primaries, and light gray to brown underneath. It may have black bars on flanks, abdomen and vent. Also, the throat is whitish, the foreneck and breast are cinnamon. The curved bill is horn-coloured with a blackish culmen. Juveniles are duller.

== Distribution and habitat ==
Its range is southeastern, northeastern and central Brazil, eastern Paraguay, southeastern Peru, Bolivia and eastern Argentina

At lower elevations (1,000 m (3,300 ft)), it favours marshy grasslands (seasonally flooded) and forest edges. While, at higher elevations, up to 2,500 m (8,200 ft), it will frequent arid shrubland, pastures, and grain fields. Overall it prefers dry savanna.

== Behavior ==
The red-winged tinamou have vocal males that are a longs ringing single whistle followed by shorter sad whistles. The female does not call. This species is most active during the hottest parts of the day.

=== Food and feeding ===
Its diet varies by season; it taking insects and other small animals (even small mammals) in the summer, and switching to vegetable matter, such as fruits, shoots, tubers and bulbs, in the winter. It can be an agricultural pest, feeding on cereals, rice and peanuts, as well as being predatory, taking poisonous snakes and even jumping up into the air to snatch an insect on vegetation.

=== Breeding ===
The male of the species attracts the female by follow feeding and after the attraction will move to the nest where she lays her eggs that he will incubate only and then raise the chicks. The clutch can contain up to five eggs. These are reddish purple in color.

== Conservation ==
Like all tinamous, the red-winged tinamou is a popular target for hunters, and in areas of high human population density number have declined, but the species has also increased in some areas where forest clearance has created favourable habitat. Overall, it is not considered threatened and is therefore listed as Least Concern by IUCN. It has an occurrence range of 5,700,000 km^{2} (2,200,000 sq mi).

== Sources ==
- BirdLife International (2008). "Red-winged Tinamou - BirdLife Species Factsheet". Data Zone.
- Clements, James (2007). The Clements Checklist of the Birds of the World (6th ed.). Ithaca, NY: Cornell University Press. ISBN 978-0-8014-4501-9.
- Davies, S.J.J.F. (2003). "Tinamous". In Hutchins, Michael (ed.). Grzimek's Animal Life Encyclopedia. Vol. 8 Birds I Tinamous and Ratites to Hoatzins (2nd ed.). Farmington Hills, MI: Gale Group. pp. 57–59, 64–65. ISBN 0-7876-5784-0.
- Remsen Jr., J. V.; et al. (4 Oct 2000). "Proposal to South American Checklist Committee (#2000-01)". South American Classification Committee. American Ornithologists' Union.
