= Challabamba District =

Coordinates: 13.2134°S 71.6489°W

Challabamba Ch'alla Pampa
- District
- Interactive map of Challabamba
- Country: Peru
- Region: Cusco
- Province: Paucartambo
- Founded: January 2, 1857
- Capital: Challabamba

Government
  - Mayor: Prof.Lucio TAPARA MAMANI

Area
  - Total: 746.56 km^{2} (288.25 sq mi)
- Elevation: 2,820 m (9,250 ft)

Population (2005 census)
  - Total: 9,600
  - Density: 13/km^{2} (33/sq mi)
- Time zone: UTC-5 (PET)
- UBIGEO: 081103

Challabamba District is one of six districts of the Paucartambo Province in Peru.

== Geography ==
One of the highest peaks of the district is Qhispi Rumiyuq at 4,059 m (13,317 ft). Other mountains are listed below:

- Anta Qhawarina
- Aymara
- Chawpi Urqu
- Chuqan Q'asa
- Chuqi Llusk'a
- Churi Muqu
- Ch'illka
- Ch'umpi Qincha
- Kicha Qaqa
- Kimsa Qucha
- Kiswarniyuq Q'asa
- Kuntur Tiyana
- Llalliyuq
- Llamayuq
- Llamachayuq
- Machaqway
- Maranniyuq
- Minas Q'asa
- Niwayuq
- Ñuñu Urqu
- Pacha Urqu
- Pacha Tusa
- Pampa Q'asa
- Paqu Pampa
- Pirqa Q'asa
- Pitu Q'asa
- Pukara
- Punayuq
- P'iti
- P'iti Qucha
- Qaqayuq
- Qucha Qucha
- Qullpa Q'asa
- Qusqu Urqu
- Qhuya P'ukru
- Q'illu Qucha
- Q'illu Q'asa
- Q'isan
- Qisan Q'asa
- Saywa Q'asa
- Sunch'uyuq
- Surayuq
- Tika Pallana
- Ukukuyuq
- Wanaku
- Wisk'achayuq
- Yana Qucha
- Yana Q'asa
- Yana Rumiyuq
- Yana Urqu

== Ethnic groups ==
The people in the district are mainly indigenous citizens of Quechua descent. Quechua is the language which the majority of the population (92.60%) learnt to speak in childhood, 7.07% of the residents started speaking using the Spanish language (2007 Peru Census).

== Climate ==
Climate data for Challabamba, elevation 2,803 m (9,196 ft), (1991–2020)
Month	Jan	Feb	Mar	Apr	May	Jun	Jul	Aug	Sep	Oct	Nov	Dec	Year
Mean daily maximum °C (°F)	19.5 (67.1)	19.4 (66.9)	19.9 (67.8)	20.1 (68.2)	20.4 (68.7)	20.4 (68.7)	20.4 (68.7)	20.0 (68.0)	20.0 (68.0)	19.9 (67.8)	20.4 (68.7)	19.9 (67.8)	20.0 (68.0)
Mean daily minimum °C (°F)	10.0 (50.0)	10.2 (50.4)	9.6 (49.3)	8.2 (46.8)	5.8 (42.4)	4.1 (39.4)	3.3 (37.9)	4.6 (40.3)	6.6 (43.9)	8.2 (46.8)	9.1 (48.4)	9.7 (49.5)	7.5 (45.4)
Average precipitation mm (inches)	162.7 (6.41)	180.4 (7.10)	136.9 (5.39)	69.0 (2.72)	16.7 (0.66)	12.7 (0.50)	14.8 (0.58)	17.4 (0.69)	19.1 (0.75)	68.9 (2.71)	72.5 (2.85)	132.3 (5.21)	903.4 (35.57)
Source: National Meteorology and Hydrology Service of Peru
