= Luychu Urqu =

Mountain in Peru

- Location within Peru

Highest point
- Elevation: 4,430 m (14,530 ft)
- Coordinates: 13°30′38″S 71°31′14″W

Naming
- Language of name: Quechua

Geography
- Location: Peru, Cusco Region, Paucartambo Province, Quispicanchi Province
- Parent range: Andes

Luychu Urqu (Quechua luychu, taruka, deer, urqu mountain, "deer mountain", Hispanicized spelling Luychu Orjo) is a mountain in the Cusco Region in Peru, about 4,430 metres (14,534 ft) high. It is situated in the Paucartambo Province, Colquepata District, and in the Quispicanchi Province, Ccatca District. Luychu Urqu lies south of the mountain Hatun Urqu (Jatun Orjo), east of the mountain Raqch'i Raqch'iyuq (Rajchi Rajchiyoc) and north of the mountains Q'illu Unuyuq (Quello Unuyoc) and Sipulturayuq (Sepulturayoc).
