= Paucartambo District, Paucartambo =

Coordinates: 13.3199°S 71.5928°W

Paucartambo Pawqar Tampu
- District
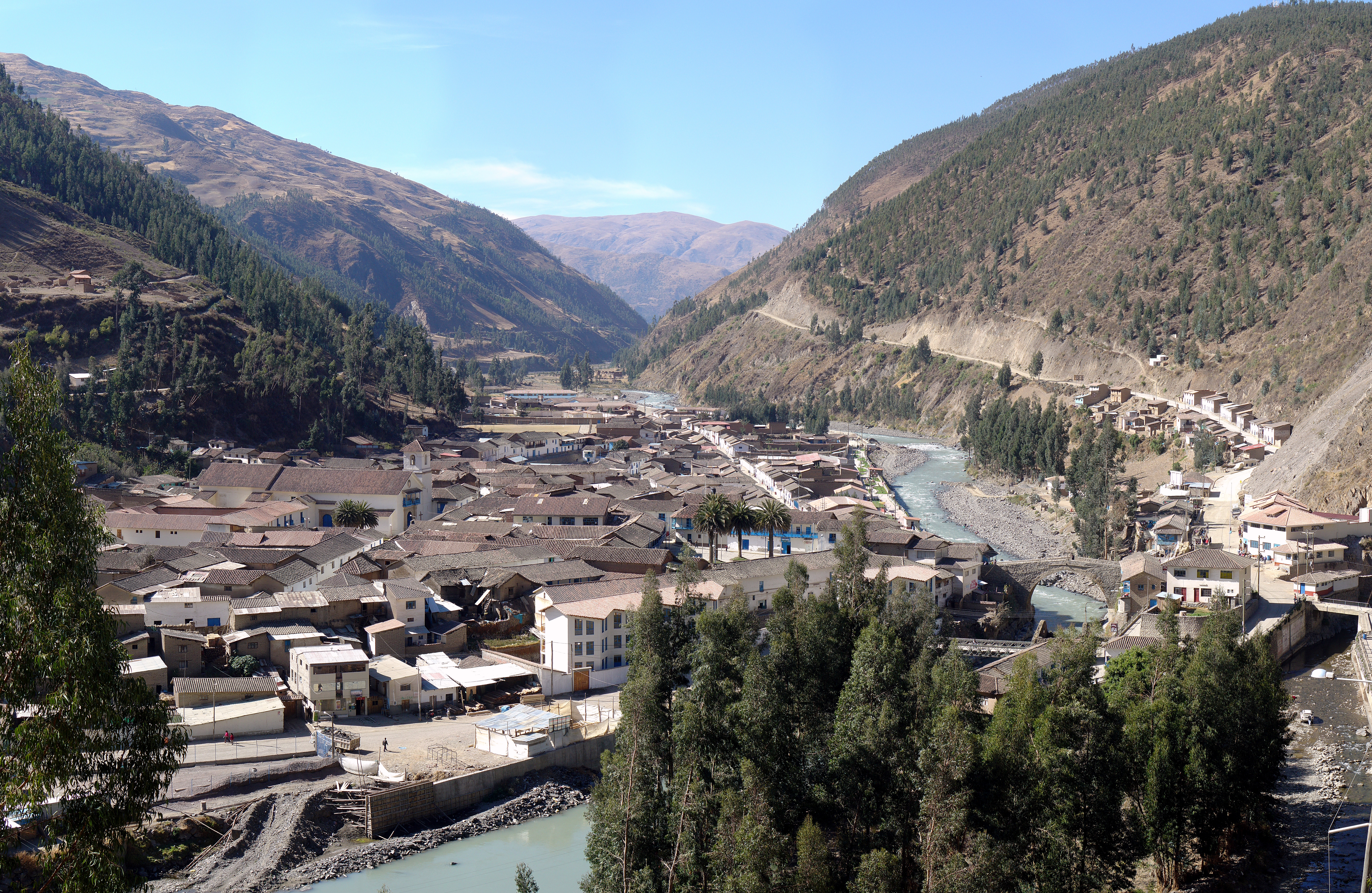
- Paucartambo
- Interactive map of Paucartambo
- Country: Peru
- Region: Cusco
- Province: Paucartambo
- Capital: Paucartambo

Government
  - Mayor: Mario Condori Huallpa

Area
  - Total: 1,079.23 km^{2} (416.69 sq mi)
- Elevation: 2,906 m (9,534 ft)

Population (2005 census)
  - Total: 14,168
  - Density: 13.128/km^{2} (34.001/sq mi)
- Time zone: UTC-5 (PET)
- UBIGEO: 081101

Paucartambo (from Quechua: Pawqar Tampu, meaning "colored tambo") is one of six districts of the Paucartambo Province in Peru.

== Geography ==
One of the highest peaks of the district is Yana Urqu at approximately 4,600 m (15,100 ft). Other mountains are listed below:

- Inti Qhawana
- Kunkaq
- K'urkurniyuq
- Llaqta Kancha
- Minasniyuq Urqu
- Misti Pukara
- Pukara Q'asa
- P'allqa Qaqa
- Qullqa
- Quri Pachaq Marka
- Qhispi Qhispiyuq
- Q'illu Mayu
- Ruq'u
- Saywa Punta
- Saywa Urqu
- Suni Urqu
- Waman Qaqa
- Wañuy Marka
- Wayna Urqu
- Wayra Kunka

== Ethnic groups ==
The people in the district are mainly indigenous citizens of Quechua descent. Quechua is the language which the majority of the population (86.03%) learnt to speak in childhood, 13.71% of the residents started speaking using the Spanish language (2007 Peru Census).

== Climate ==
Climate data for Paucartambo, elevation 2,931 m (9,616 ft), (1991–2020)
Month	Jan	Feb	Mar	Apr	May	Jun	Jul	Aug	Sep	Oct	Nov	Dec	Year
Mean daily maximum °C (°F)	20.4 (68.7)	20.4 (68.7)	20.7 (69.3)	21.3 (70.3)	21.8 (71.2)	21.8 (71.2)	21.6 (70.9)	21.4 (70.5)	21.3 (70.3)	21.3 (70.3)	21.6 (70.9)	20.9 (69.6)	21.2 (70.2)
Mean daily minimum °C (°F)	9.2 (48.6)	9.3 (48.7)	8.9 (48.0)	7.9 (46.2)	6.3 (43.3)	5.1 (41.2)	4.3 (39.7)	5.0 (41.0)	6.6 (43.9)	7.9 (46.2)	8.7 (47.7)	9.2 (48.6)	7.4 (45.3)
Average precipitation mm (inches)	125.8 (4.95)	124.6 (4.91)	97.9 (3.85)	40.5 (1.59)	11.7 (0.46)	8.0 (0.31)	9.8 (0.39)	16.3 (0.64)	14.3 (0.56)	43.4 (1.71)	47.6 (1.87)	95.6 (3.76)	635.5 (25)
Source: National Meteorology and Hydrology Service of Peru

== Culture ==
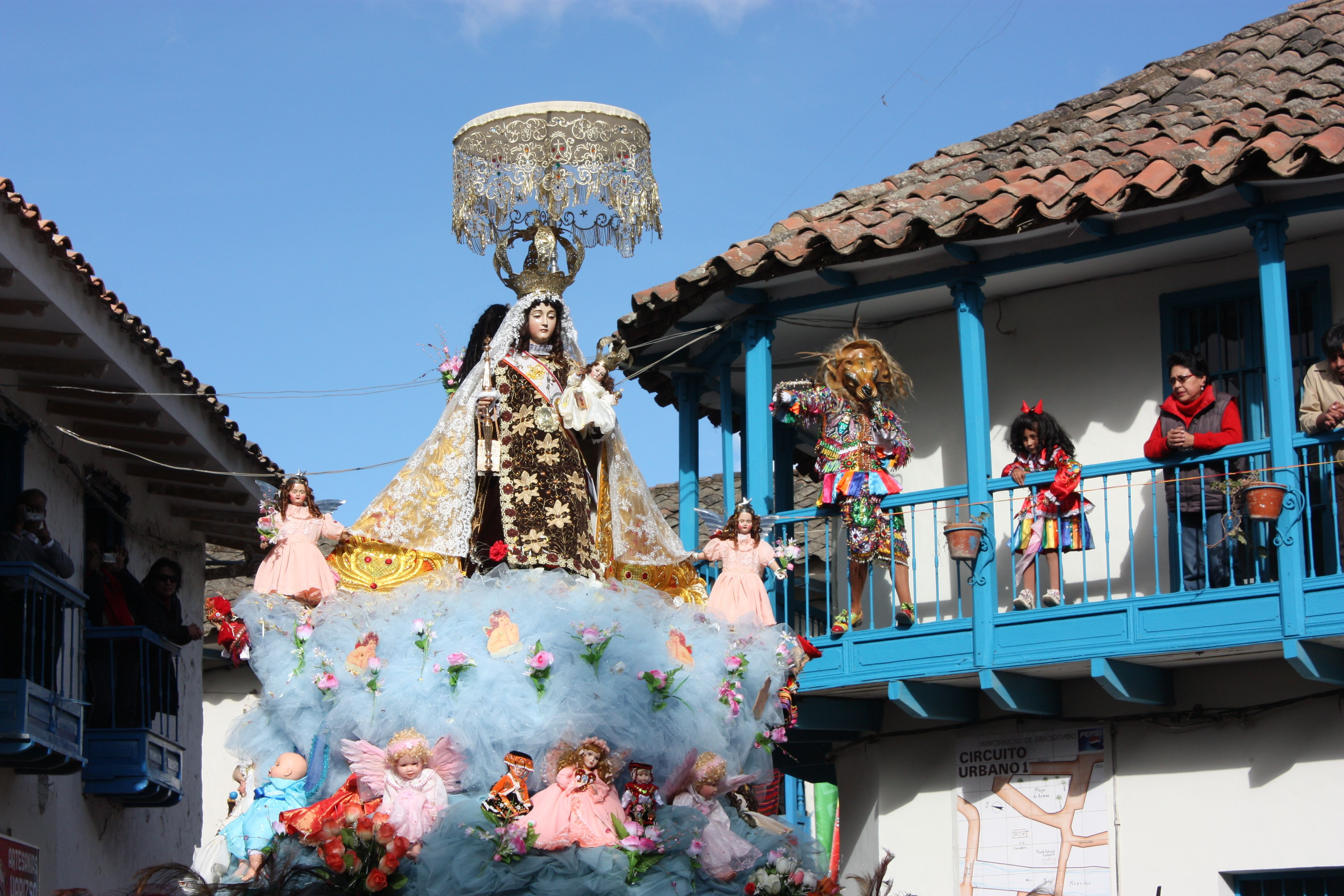
A saqra dancer watching the procession of Mamacha Carmen from a balcony

The people of the district have an annual festival in honor of their patron saint, Mamacha Carmen. The Virgin Mary is carried in procession through the streets, preceded and followed by traditional dancers of several types, and many festival goers. Traditional dances of the festival include Chukchu, Ch'unchu, Qhapaq negro, Qhapaq Qulla and Saqra.

== Subdistricts ==
- Karaikallo (Karaikallo)
- Paucartambo (Osorio)

== Cantons ==
- Karaikallo (Karaikallo)
- Paucartambo (Paucartambo)
- Osorio (Osorio)
