= Ninamarca =

Archeological site

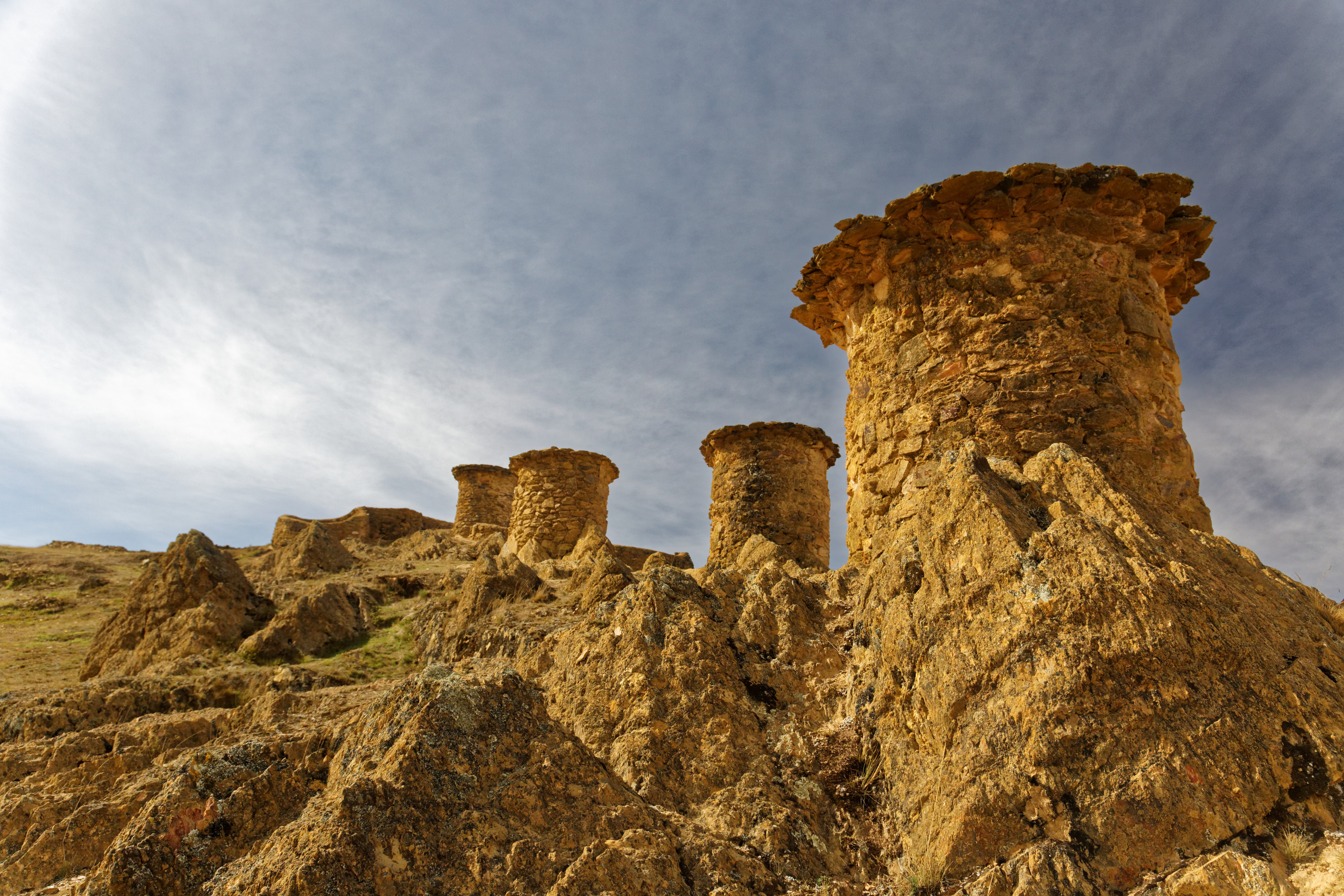
- Chullpas at Ninamarca

- Location within Peru
- Interactive map of Ninamarca
- 13°23′30″S 71°37′19″W
- Cultures: pre-Inca
- Location: Peru
- Region: Cusco Region

Ninamarca (possibly from Quechua nina fire, marka village, "fire village") is an archaeological site in Peru. It is located in the Cusco Region, Paucartambo Province, Colquepata District, southeast of Colquepata near the village of Ninamaca. There are about 30 chullpas of pre-Inca times situated on top of a mountain at about 3,000 m.
