= Qhiwar =

Mountain in Peru

- Location within Peru

Highest point
- Elevation: 4,400 m (14,400 ft)
- Coordinates: 13°27′48″S 71°45′19″W

Naming
- Language of name: Quechua

Geography
- Location: Peru, Cusco Region
- Parent range: Andes

Qhiwar (Quechua for a narrow valley, usually with a river, hispanicized spelling Quehuar) is a mountain in the Cusco Region in Peru, about 4,400 metres (14,436 ft) high. It is situated in the Calca Province, San Salvador District. Qhiwar lies between Hatun Punta in the east and Wallwa Qhata in the southwest.
