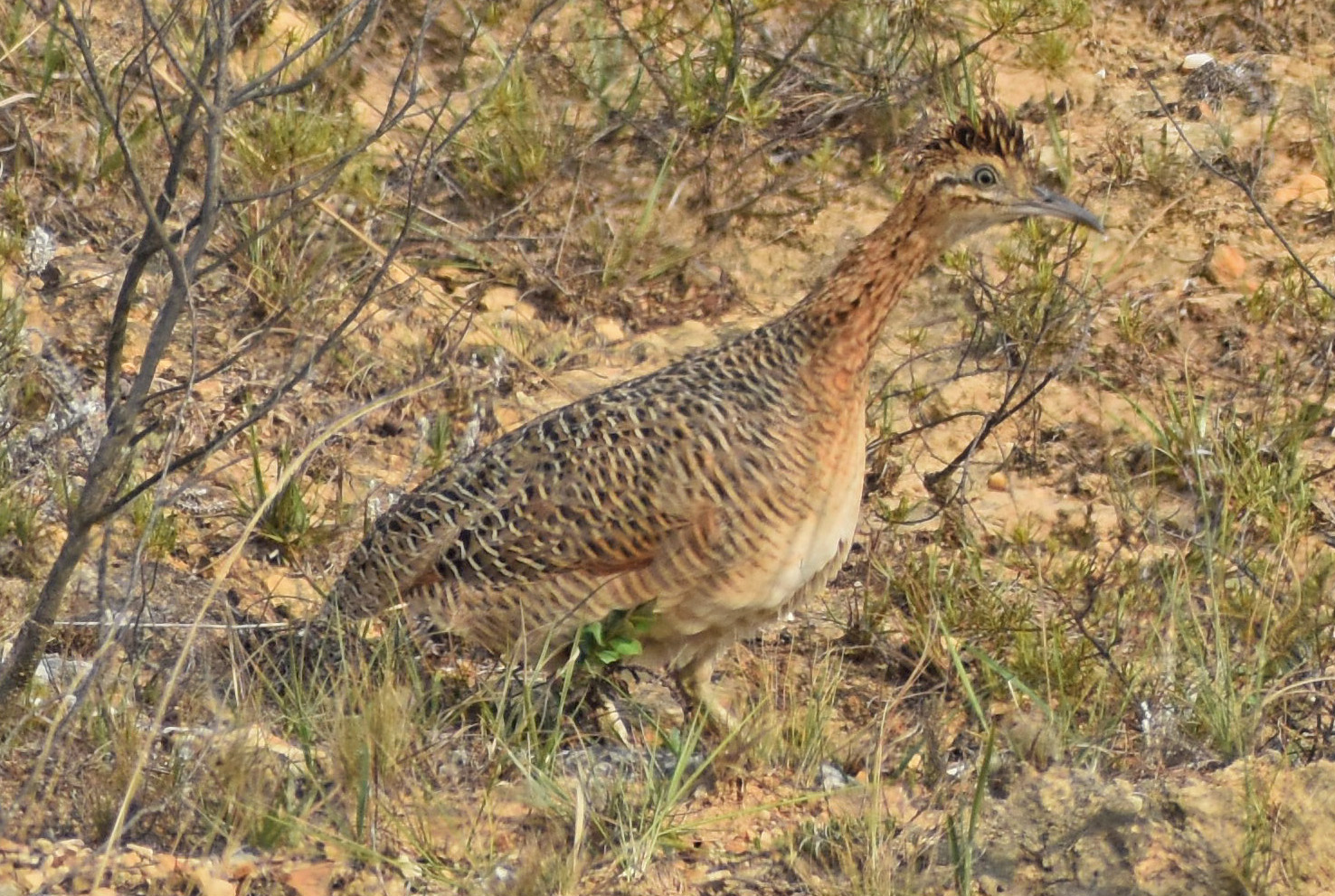

Conservation status
- Least Concern (IUCN 3.1)

Scientific classification
- Kingdom: Animalia
- Phylum: Chordata
- Class: Aves
- Infraclass: Palaeognathae
- Order: Tinamiformes
- Family: Tinamidae
- Genus: Rhynchotus
- Species: R. maculicollis

Binomial name
- Rhynchotus maculicollis G.R. Gray, 1867

Synonyms
- Rhynchotis maculicollis

= Huayco tinamou =

Species of bird

The huayco tinamou (Rhynchotus maculicollis), also known as waypu (Quechua) (also spelled guaipo, huaipo, guaypo, waypo, a name which is also applied for other Tinamidae species), is a species of bird found on grassy mountain ridges in the Andes of Bolivia and Argentina.

== Taxonomy ==
All tinamous are from the family Tinamidae, and in the larger scheme are also ratites. Unlike other ratites, tinamous can fly, although in general, they are not strong fliers. All ratites evolved from prehistoric flying birds, and tinamous are the closest living relative of these birds.

Previously, it was considered a subspecies of the red-winged tinamou, but it has a different song, and its head and neck are streaked and spotted black. The SACC split this into a monotypic species and the IUCN followed suit in 2006.

== Description ==
The huayco tinamou has a black streaked and spotted head and neck.

== Behavior ==
Like other tinamous, the huayco tinamou eats fruit off the ground or low-lying bushes. They also eat small amounts of invertebrates, flower buds, tender leaves, seeds, and roots. The male incubates the eggs which may come from different females, and then will raise them until they are ready to be on their own. The nest is located on the ground in dense brush or between raised root buttresses.

== Range and habitat ==
The huayco tinamou lives in the Andes of northwestern Argentina and Bolivia from 380 to 3,580 m (1,250–11,750 ft). It occurs in dry savanna and scrubland, and cereal fields.

== Conservation ==
The IUCN classifies this tinamou as Least Concern, with an occurrence range of 331,000 km^{2} (128,000 sq mi). It suffers from hunting and burning of pampas grassland, but benefits from clearing of tropical forests.
