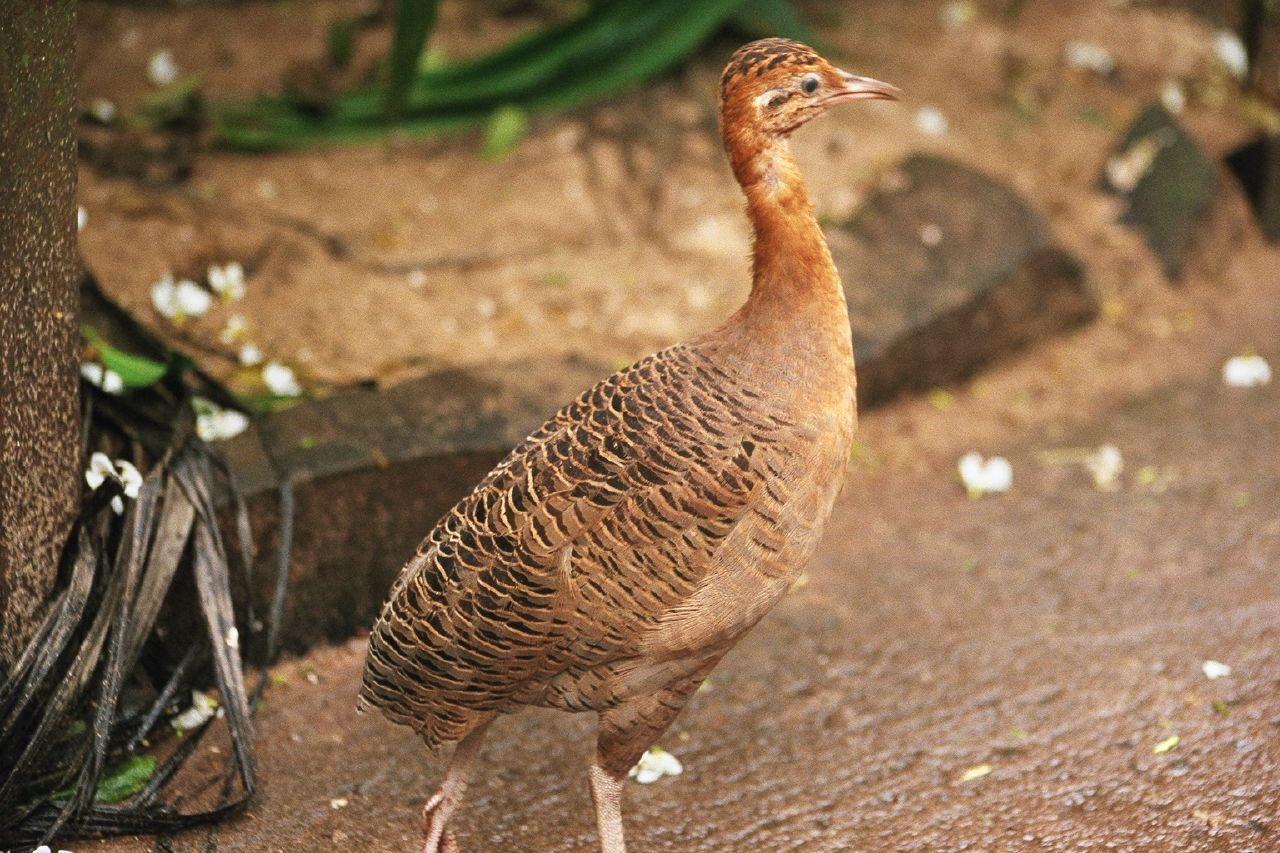
- Red-winged tinamou, Rhynchotus rufescens

Scientific classification
- Kingdom: Animalia
- Phylum: Chordata
- Class: Aves
- Infraclass: Palaeognathae
- Order: Tinamiformes
- Family: Tinamidae
- Subfamily: Nothurinae
- Genus: Rhynchotus; Spix, 1825

Type species
- Tinamus rufescens Temminck, 1815

Species
- Rhynchotus rufescens Red-winged tinamou Rhynchotus maculicollis Huayco tinamou

= Rhynchotus =

Genus of birds

Rhynchotus is a genus of birds in the tinamou family. This genus comprises two members of this South American family.

== Taxonomy ==
Tinamous have evolved from ratites and are the only extant ratites that fly, and are the closest to the ancestral flying ratites.

=== Species ===
The species are:

Genus Rhynchotus – Spix, 1825 – two species
| Common name | Scientific name and subspecies | Range | Size and ecology | IUCN status and estimated population |
|---|---|---|---|---|
| red-winged tinamou | Rhynchotus rufescens (Temminck, 1815) Three subspecies: R. r. rufescens, located in southeastern Peru, Bolivia, Paraguay, southeastern Brazil, and northeastern Argentina.; R. r. catingae, located in central and northeastern Brazil; R. r. pallascens, located in northeastern Argentina | Northern and central Argentina, Brazil, except the western portion, Paraguay, Colombia, and southeastern Peru, and possibly in Uruguay | Size: Habitat: Diet: | LC |
| huayco tinamou | Rhynchotus maculicollis G.R. Gray, 1867 | Andes of northwestern Argentina and Bolivia. | Size: Habitat: Diet: | LC |
