= Huancarani District =

Coordinates: 13.5020°S 71.6157°W

Huancarani Wankarani
- District
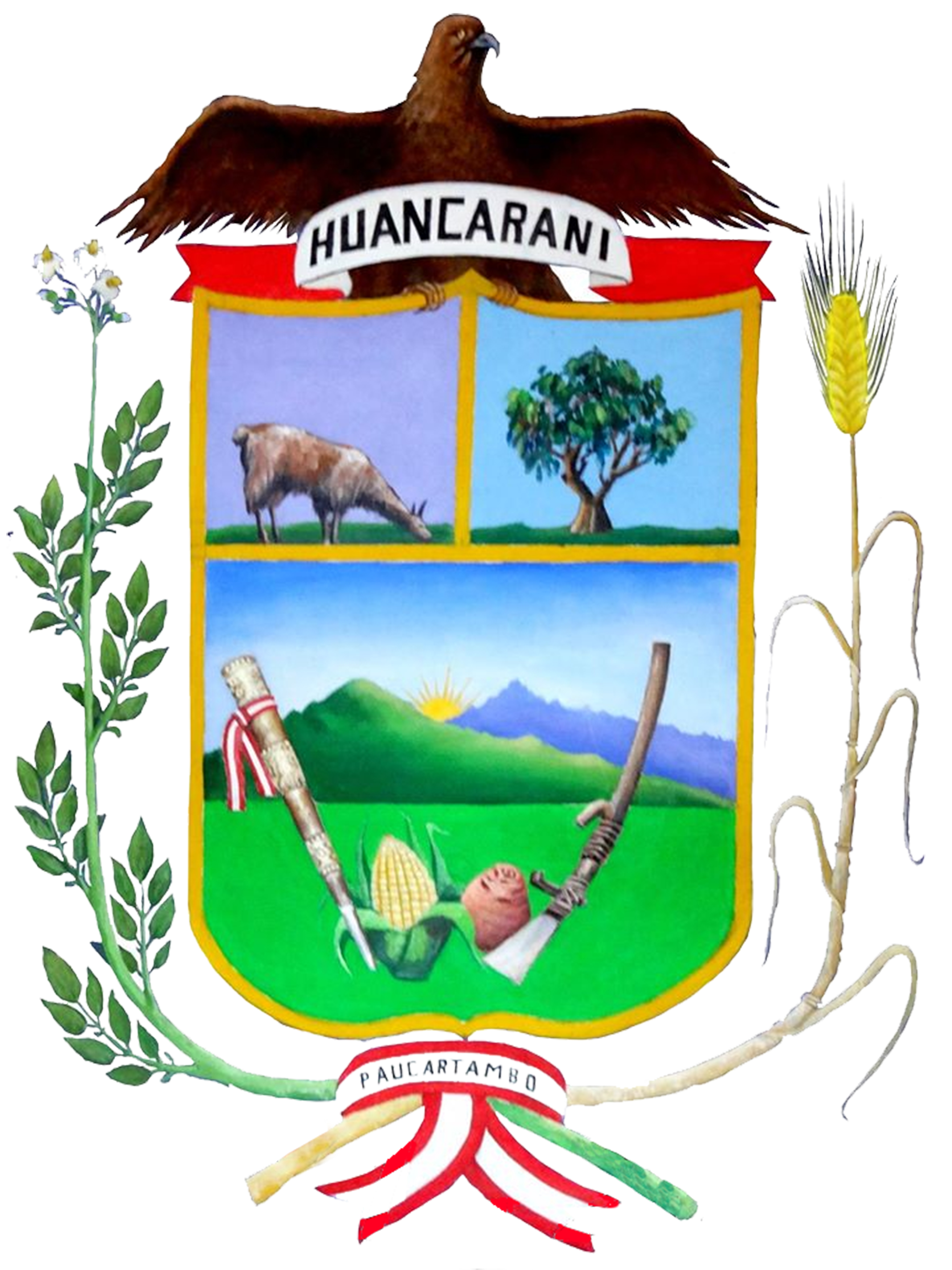
- Coat of arms
- Interactive map of Huancarani
- Country: Peru
- Region: Cusco
- Province: Paucartambo
- Founded: May 11, 1987
- Capital: Huancarani

Government
  - Mayor: José Patricio Mendoza Ccahuana

Area
  - Total: 145.14 km^{2} (56.04 sq mi)
- Elevation: 3,850 m (12,630 ft)

Population (2005 census)
  - Total: 6,060
  - Density: 41.8/km^{2} (108/sq mi)
- Time zone: UTC-5 (PET)
- UBIGEO: 081105

Huancarani District is one of six districts of the province Paucartambo in Peru.

== Demographics ==
The people in the district are mainly indigenous citizens of Quechua descent. According to the 2007 Peru Census, Quechua is the language which the majority of the population (94.86%) learnt to speak in childhood, while 4.91% of the residents spoke Spanish. According to the 2017 Peruvian census, Quechua remains the predominant indigenous language in the district.
