= San Salvador District =

Coordinates: 13.4921°S 71.7792°W

San Salvador
- District
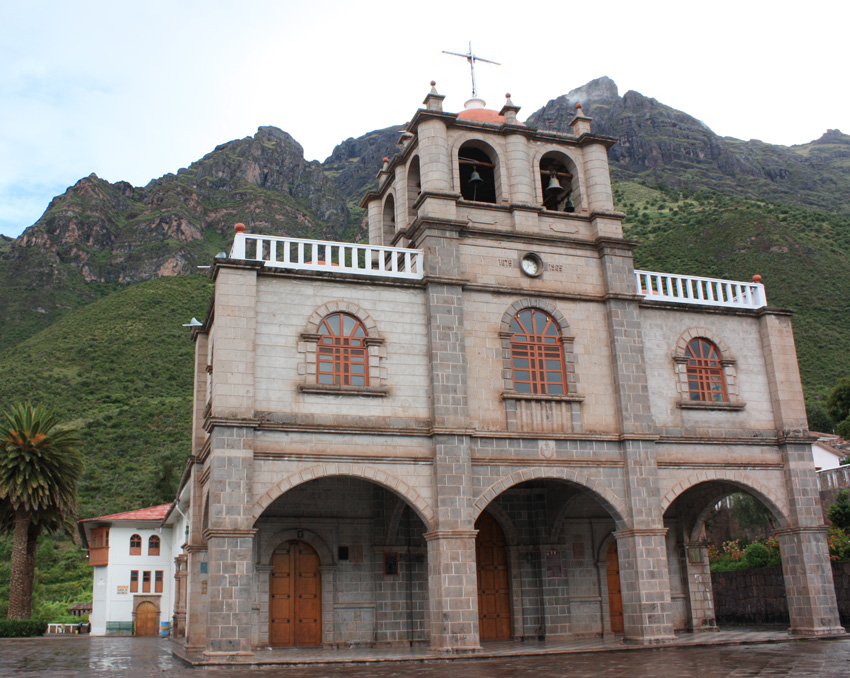
- The mountain Pachatusan above the sanctuary Señor de Huanca, San Salvador, both declared a National Cultural Heritage
- Interactive map of San Salvador
- Country: Peru
- Region: Cusco
- Province: Calca
- Founded: February 28, 1946
- Capital: San Salvador

Government
  - Mayor: Reynaldo Quispitupa Tupayupanqui

Area
  - Total: 128.07 km^{2} (49.45 sq mi)
- Elevation: 2,995 m (9,826 ft)

Population (2005 census)
  - Total: 4,966
  - Density: 38.78/km^{2} (100.4/sq mi)
- Time zone: UTC-5 (PET)
- UBIGEO: 080406

San Salvador District is one of eight districts of the province Calca in Peru.

== Geography ==
One of the highest peaks of the district is Pachatusan at 4,842 m (15,886 ft). Other mountains are listed below:

- Hatun Punta
- Kunkayuq
- Kusi Waqu
- Machu Kuntur Sinqa
- Pachatusan
- Pukayuq
- P'allqa Rayaq
- P'unquchayuq
- Qhiwar
- Silla Pampa
- Simp'ayuq
- Tampuyuq
- Tawqa
- Wallwa Qhata
- Waypun
- Yana Qaqa
- Yuraq Q'asa

== Ethnic groups ==
The people in the district are mainly indigenous citizens of Quechua descent. Quechua is the language which the majority of the population (88.68%) learnt to speak in childhood, 10.99% of the residents started speaking using the Spanish language (2007 Peru Census).

== Gallery ==
Fields in the San Salvador District

== See also ==
- Saqra
