= Pumacancha =

Mountain in Peru

- Location within Peru

Highest point
- Elevation: 4,547.9 m (14,921 ft)
- Coordinates: 13°33′46″S 71°39′58″W

Naming
- Language of name: Quechua

Geography
- Location: Peru, Cusco Region, Paucartambo Province
- Parent range: Andes

Pumacancha (possibly from Quechua puma cougar, puma, kancha enclosure, enclosed place, yard, a frame, or wall that encloses) is a mountain in the Cusco Region in Peru, about 4,547.9 metres (14,921 ft) high. It is situated in the Paucartambo Province, Caicay District.

== See also ==
- Curi
