= Qullqiri (Cusco) =

Mountain in Peru

- Location within Peru

Highest point
- Elevation: 4,263.8 m (13,989 ft)
- Coordinates: 13°23′45″S 71°42′42″W

Naming
- Language of name: Quechua

Geography
- Location: Peru, Cusco Region, Paucartambo Province
- Parent range: Andes

Qullqiri (Aymara and Quechua qullqi silver, -ri a suffix, Hispanicized spelling Collquere) is a mountain in the Cusco Region in Peru, about 4,263.8 metres (13,989 ft) high. It is situated in the Paucartambo Province, Colquepata District (Qullqipata). Qullqiri lies north-west of the lake Kiskay (Quescay).
