= Qhapaq negro =

Peruvian dance

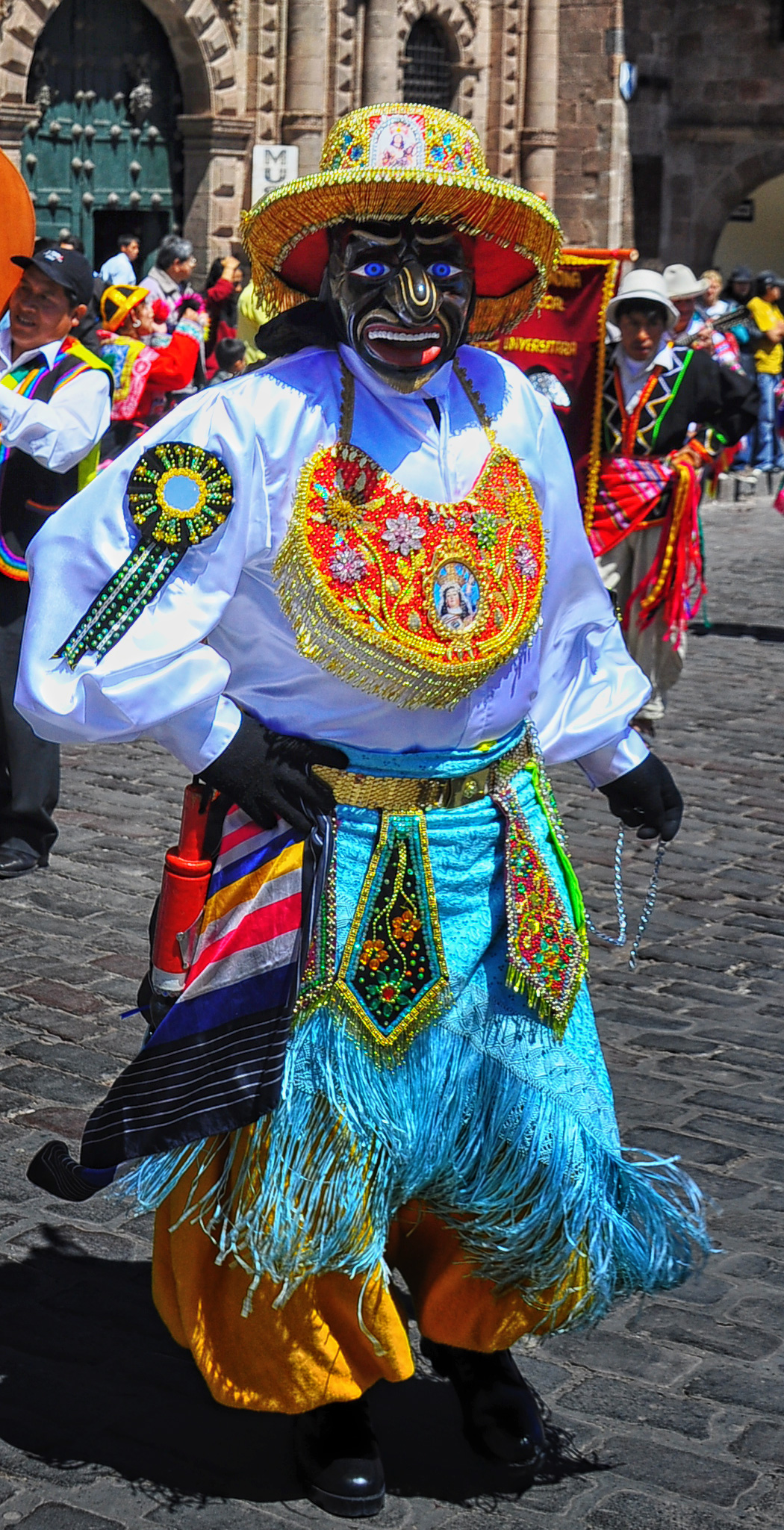
- Festive costume of Qhapaq negro
- Etymology: from Quechua qhapaq 'Noble' and Spanish negro 'Black'
- Origin: Paucartambo, Cusco, Peru

Qhapaq negro (Quechua qhapaq noble, principal, mighty, negro Spanish for black / also refers to person with sub-Saharan African or "black" ancestry) is a traditional dance in the Cusco Region in Peru. It is performed at festivals such as Mamacha Carmen in Paucartambo, celebrating Our Lady of Mount Carmel. and the Festividad de la Virgen del Rosario (Festival of the Virgin of the Rosary) in the town of Huallhua, San Salvador District, Calca Province, Cusco Department.

== See also ==
- Ch'unchu
- Qhapaq Qulla
- Saqra
