= Othmar Reiser =

Austro-Slovenian ornithologist and naturalist

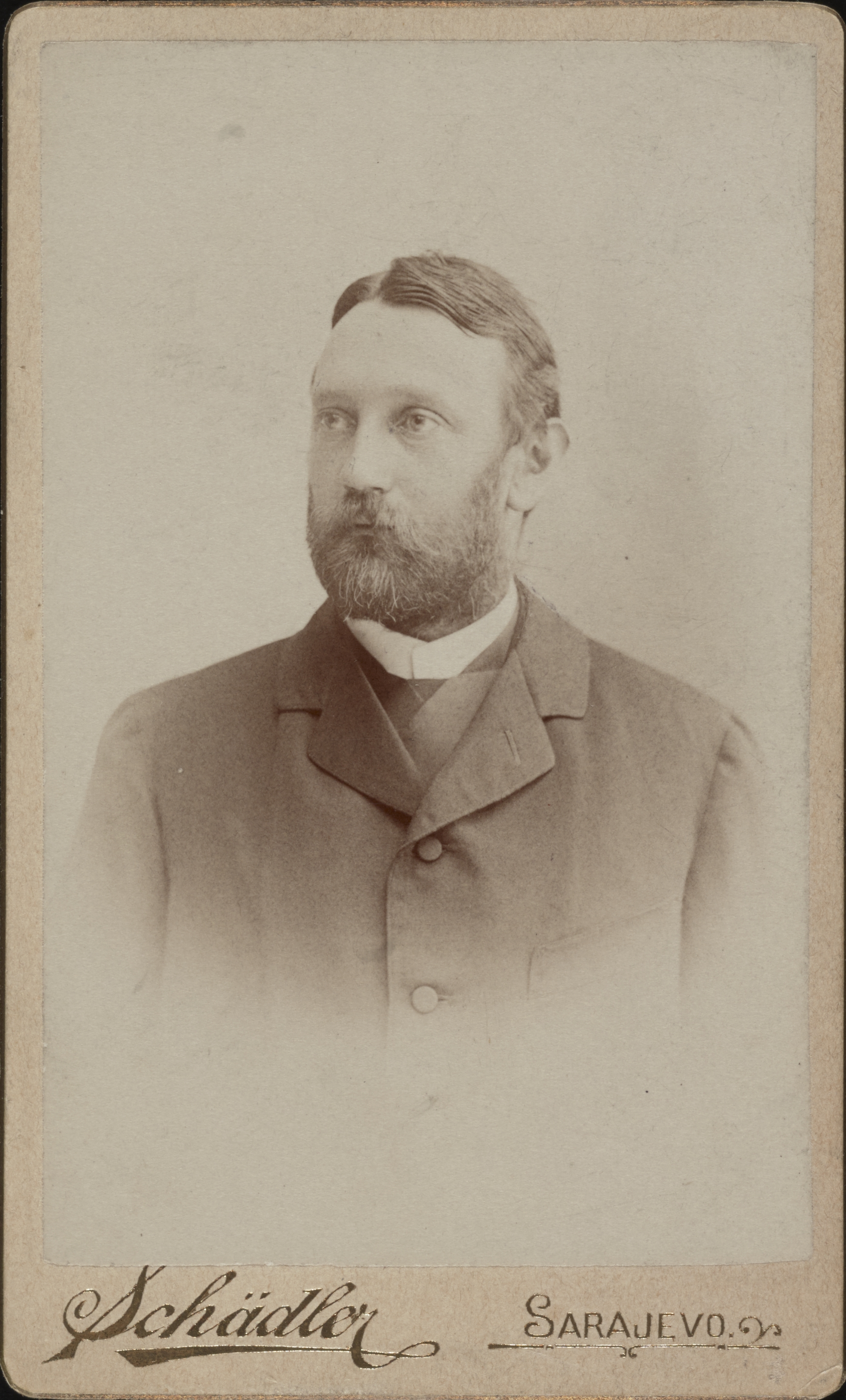
Carte-de-visite c. 1900

Othmar Reiser or Otmar Rajzer (21 December 1861 – 31 March 1936, Pickern) was an Austro-Slovenian ornithologist and naturalist who worked as curator of the bird collections in the natural history museum at Sarajevo, working there from its foundation for thirty-three years during which he explored various regions including the Balkans and South America and collected specimens. Several species have been named after him.

== Biography ==
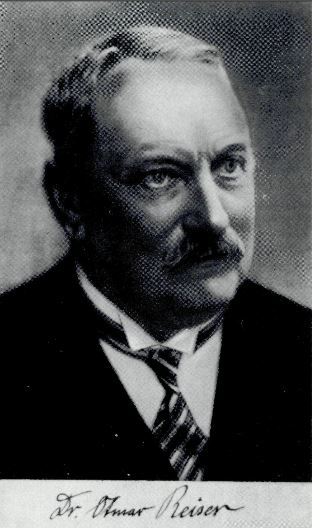
Dr. phil. h.c. Otmar Reiser (1861-1936)

Reiser was born in Vienna, son of a well known lawyer, Otmar Reiser sr. whose namesake father was a well-known mayor of Maribor. He studied at the local gymnasium, at Novo Mesto (matriculating in 1882) and then joined as a reserve lieutenant in the 47th Infantry Regiment. He then went to the College of Agriculture in Vienna (graduating in 1887). He was involved in founding the National Museum of Bosnia and Herzegovina in Sarajevo and then joined its department of Natural History and worked there until retirement in 1919. He worked at the ornithological observatory at Ljubljana and studied Balkan birds. He also studied the birds of Sarajevo and contributed specimens to the Maribor Museum. He received an honorary doctorate from the University of Graz in 1932. His collections of eggs and bird skins were donated to the museum in Sarajevo. Reiser exhibited his collections at the 1891 International Ornithological Congress in Budapest, at the Millenium Exhibition, Budapest and at the international hunting exhibition in Vienna (1910). He took part in expeditions to Montenegro, Bulgaria, Greece, Brazil, and Serbia. He also collected plants and was in charge of the herbarium after the death of the botanist Franz Fiala.

In 1903 he took part in an expedition of the Austrian Academy of Sciences to north-east Brazil, during which he was the first to observe the Spix's macaw in the wild since its original discovery 84 years earlier.

== Works ==
- Bericht über die Besichtigungen des Spix-Aras bei Paranaguá in Piauí während der Expedition der K.u.K Akademie der Wissenschaften im Jahre 1903
- Die VogelSammlung des bosnischhercegowin Landesmuseums in Sarajevo, Budapest (1891)
- Bericht über die botanische Ergebnisse meiner naturwissenschaftlichen Sammelreisen in Serbien in den Jahren 1899 u. 1900 (1905)
- Materialen zu einer Ornis Balcanica Annalen des Naturhistorischen Museums in Wien (1939)
- Die Vögel von Marburg an der Drau. Nebst Erinnerungen an den steierischen Ornithologen Eduard Seidensacher, Graz 1925.
