= Saqra =

Peruvian traditional dance

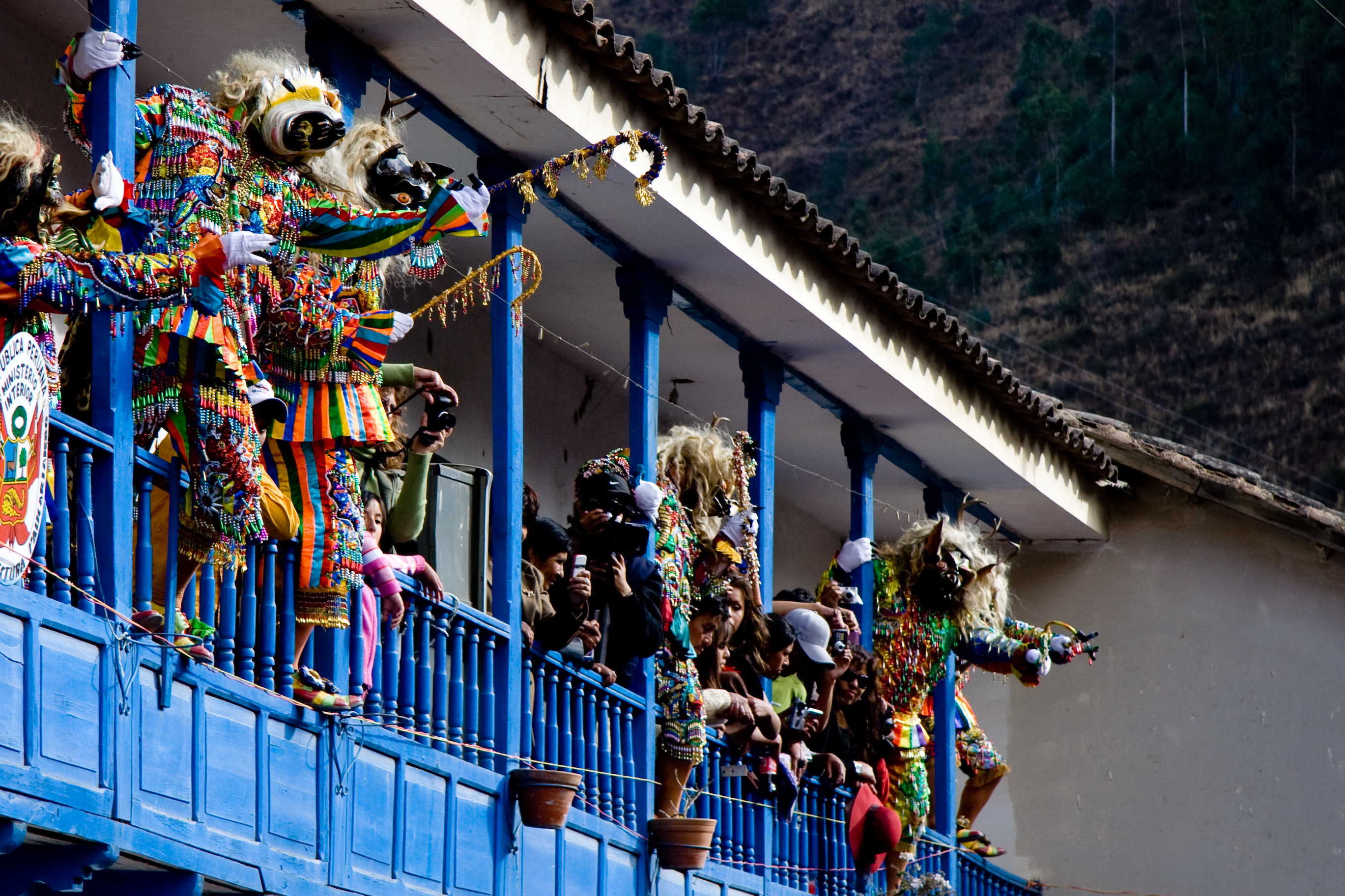
- Saqra dancers watching the procession of Mamacha Carmen from a balcony
- Etymology: from Quechua saqra 'devil'
- Origin: Paucartambo, Cusco, Peru

Saqra (Quechua for malignant, pernicious, bad, bad tempered, wicked / restless / devil, a synonym of supay; but, unlike Supay, a Saqra entity just plays innocent tricks. Mostly it is represented with animal figures.) is a traditional dance in the highlands of the Cusco Region in Peru. The dancers dress as animal figures. This traditional dance has its origins in the late 19th century in the province of Paucartambo, Cusco and was inspired by the sacred paintings of the so called “Mamacha Carmen” also known as the "Virgen del Carmen". Saqra means roguery, restlessness, agility or mischief in English.

It is performed at feasts in honor of patron saints such as Mamacha Carmen in Paucartambo and Virgen del Rosario de Huallhua in the San Salvador District of the Calca Province.

== See also ==
- Ch'unchu
- Qhapaq negro
- Qhapaq Qulla
