= Ch'unchu (dance) =

Peruvian dance

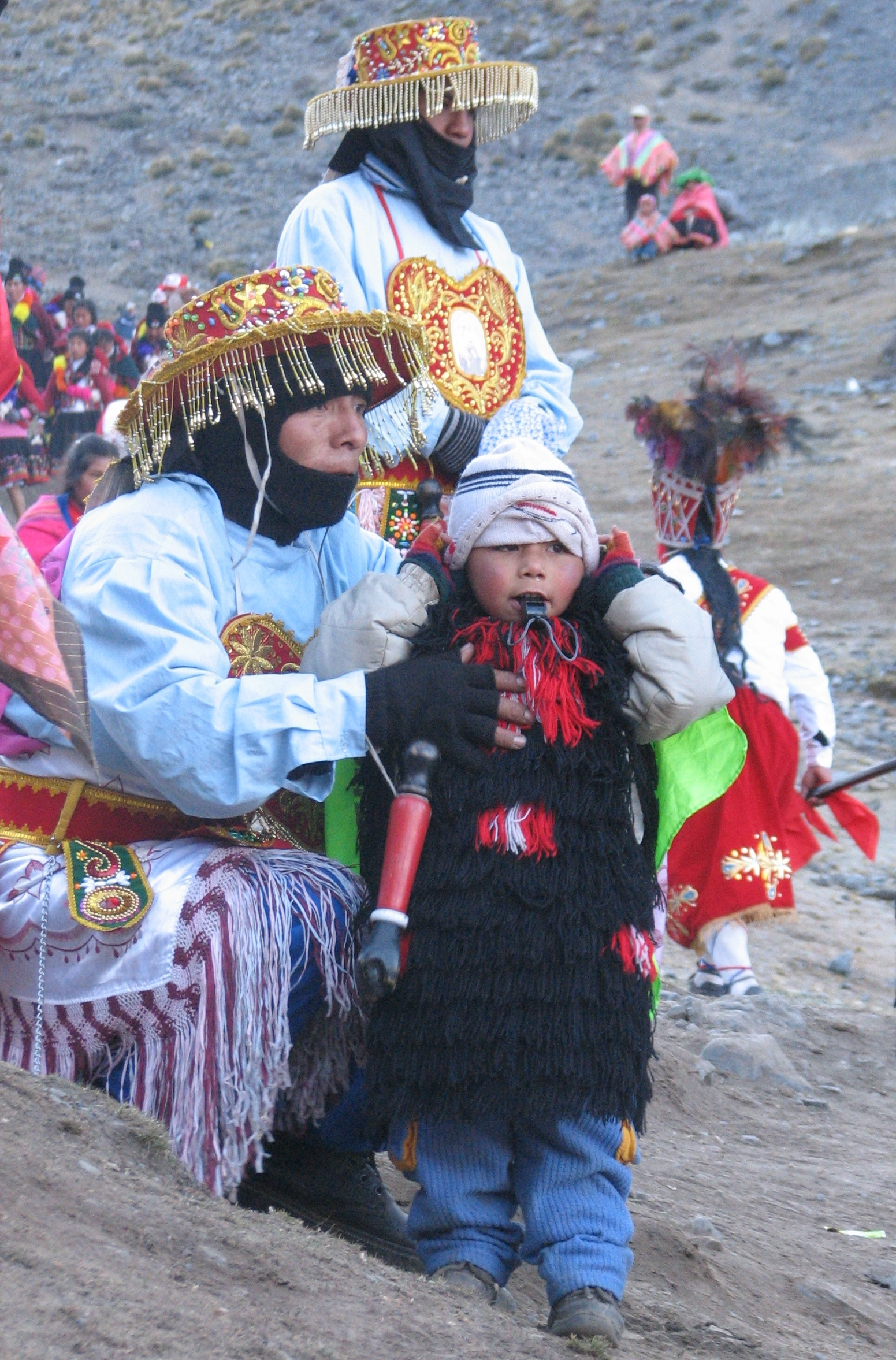
- Participants at the Quyllur Rit'i festival. A ch'unchu performer can be seen in the background.
- Etymology: from Quechua Ch'unchu
- Origin: Paucartambo, Cusco, Peru

Ch'unchu is a folk dance in Peru. It is performed on festivals of the Cusco Region like Mamacha Carmen in Paucartambo and Quyllur Rit'i. Varieties include q'ara ch'unchu, qhapaq ch'unchu and wayri ch'unchu. Its name comes from a derogatory Quechua word (also used in Aymara) for native inhabitants of the Amazon rainforest.

== See also ==
- Ch'unchu people
- Qhapaq negro
- Qhapaq Qulla
- Saqra
