= Qhapaq Qulla =

Peruvian dance

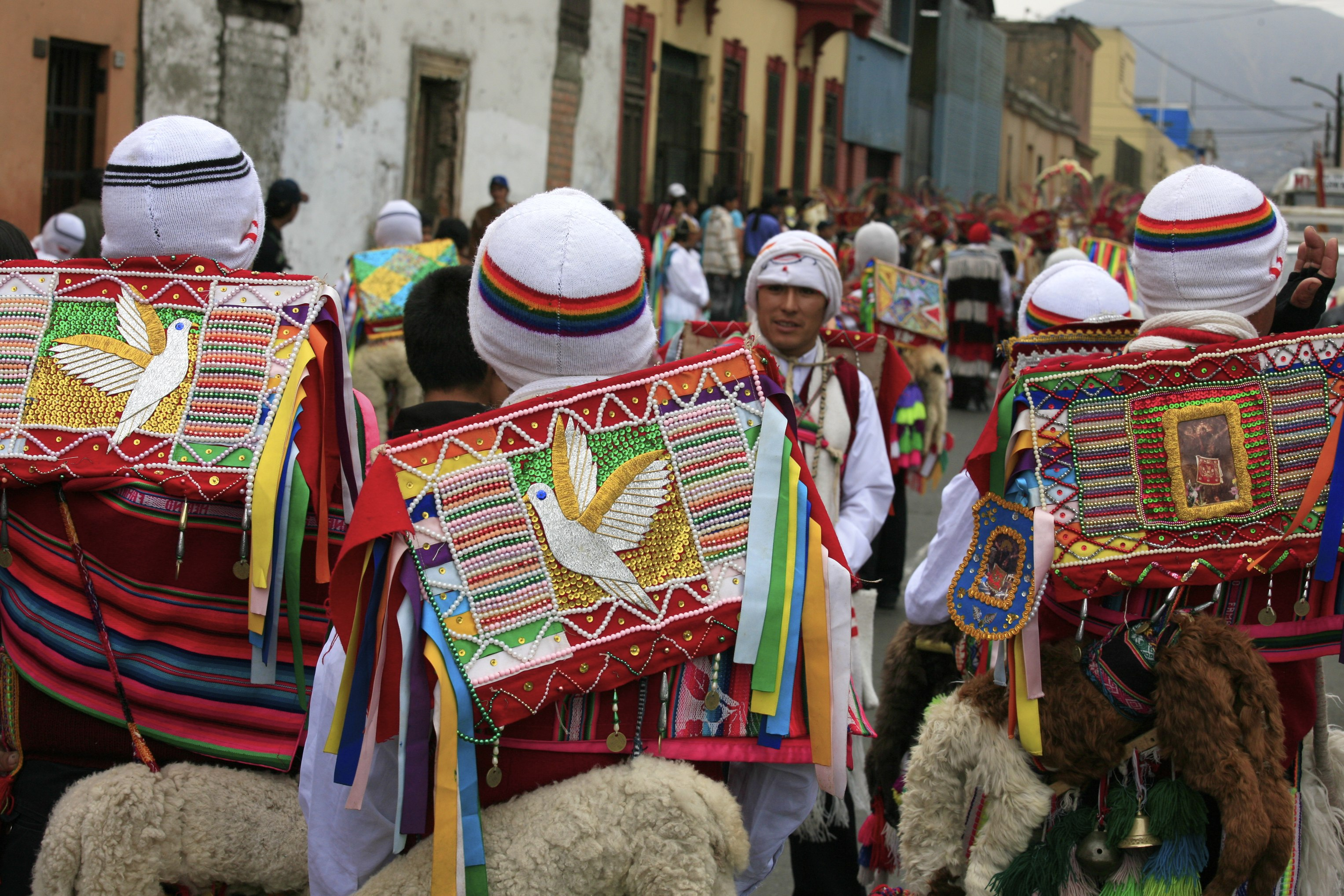
- Festive costume of Qhapaq Qulla dancers
- Etymology: from Quechua qhapaq 'Noble' and Quechua Qulla 'Indigenous people'
- Origin: Paucartambo, Cusco, Peru

Qhapaq Qulla (Quechua qhapaq noble, principal, mighty; Qulla an indigenous people) is a folk dance in Peru. It is performed at festivals of the Cusco Region, such as Mamacha Carmen in Paucartambo and the important Quyllur Rit'i at the Winter Solstice on the mountain Qullqipunku.

== See also ==
- Ch'unchu
- Qhapaq negro
- Saqra
