= Curi (Paucartambo) =

Mountain in Peru

- Location within Peru

Highest point
- Elevation: 4,200 m (13,800 ft)
- Coordinates: 13°38′25″S 71°39′20″W

Naming
- Language of name: Quechua

Geography
- Location: Peru, Cusco Region, Paucartambo Province, Quispicanchi Province
- Parent range: Andes

Curi (possibly from Quechua for gold) is a mountain in the Cusco Region in Peru, about 4,200 metres (13,780 ft) high. It is situated in the Paucartambo Province, Caicay District, and in the Quispicanchi Province, in the districts Andahuaylillas and Urcos. Curi lies on the right bank of the Vilcanota River, north of the mountain Wiraqucha.
