= Tupac (disambiguation) =

Tupac Shakur (1971–1996) was an American rapper, songwriter, and actor.

Tupac may also refer to:

- Tupac (name), a list of people with the given name
- Operation Tupac, Inter-Services Intelligence activities in India
- "Tupac", a song by DaBaby from his 2019 album Baby on Baby
- "2 Pac", a song by Future from his 2014 mixtape Monster

== See also ==
- Tupaç, a town in Tatarstan
- Túpac Amaru (disambiguation)
