= Amaru =

Amaru may refer to:

== Places ==
- Amaru, Buzău, a village in Buzău County, Romania
- Amaru, Rimatara, a village on the island of Rimatara, French Polynesia
- Amaru Marka Wasi, an archaeological site in Peru

== People ==
- Tupac Amaru Shakur, American rapper, actor and poet
- Amaru, 7th century Indian poet, author of Amaru Shataka
- Aline Amaru (born 1941), Tahitian textile artist
- Túpac Amaru, the last indigenous leader of the Inca state in South America
- Túpac Amaru II, leader of an indigenous uprising in 1780 against Spanish Viceroyalty of Peru
- Bobby Amaru, the lead singer of the American rock band Saliva

== Other ==
- Amaru (mythology), a mythical serpent of Inca and other Andean mythology
- Amaru Entertainment, a record label founded by the mother of deceased rapper Tupac Shakur
- Amaru Ryudo, a fictional character in the Sohryuden: Legend of the Dragon Kings novels
- Amaru, a fictional character in Naruto Shippuden the Movie: Bonds
- Amaru, a fictional creature from LoliRock

== See also ==
- Amarus, a vocal composition by Czech composer Leoš Janáček
- Amaro (disambiguation)
- Túpac Amaru (disambiguation)
