= Surimana (town) =

Surimana Surimana
- Locality
- Santuario Nacional de la Revolución
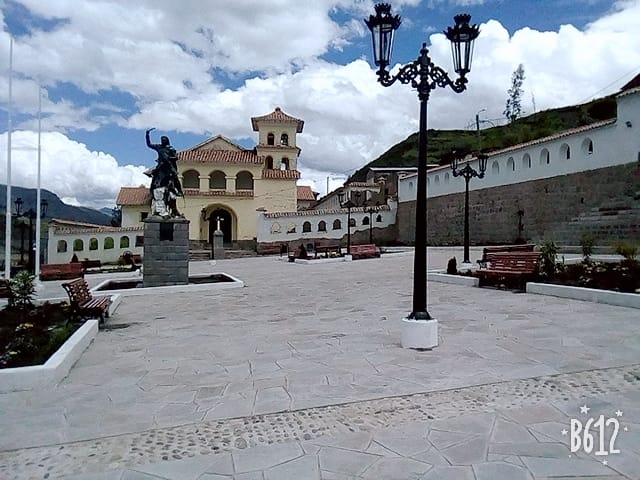
- Vista de la plaza Mayor Santa Barbara en Surimana con fondo del Templo de Nuestra Señora de la Purificación.
- Nickname: Cuna de la emancipación latinoamericana (Cradle of Latin American emancipation)
- Motto: "One heart, one mind, and one strength! We will win!"
- Location within Peru
- Coordinates: 14°09′13″S 71°31′30″W
- Department: Cuzco
- Province: Canas
- District: Túpac Amaru

Government
  - Mayor: Santiago Ccacya Chacca

Area
  - Total: 2,519 km^{2} (973 sq mi)
- Elevation: 3,520–3,610 m (11,550–11,840 ft)

Population (2017)
  - Total: 3,650
- Time zone: UTC -5

Surimana is a Peruvian locality, the capital of the District of Túpac Amaru, located in the province of Canas in the Department of Cuzco. It is known for being the birthplace of the 1781 rebellion, led by José Gabriel Condorcanqui, Túpac Amaru II.

== Etymology ==
The name Surimana could come from the Aymara language, meaning 'morning dew'; or from the Quechua suri, 'Andean rhea' and manan, 'no'; it is known that in Surimana there were many of these birds that disappeared after the Spanish conquest. The natives, worried, would say to each other suri mana kapunchu, meaning "the suri has disappeared". Over time, with Spanish influence, the name was shortened to Surimana.

== History ==
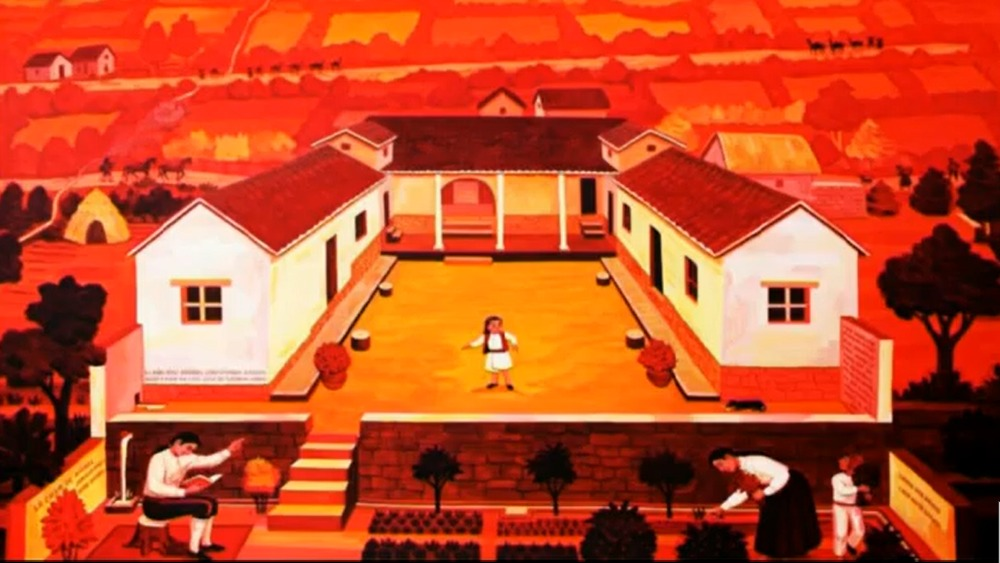
House of the revolutionary leader José Gabriel Condorcanqui Noguera in Surimana

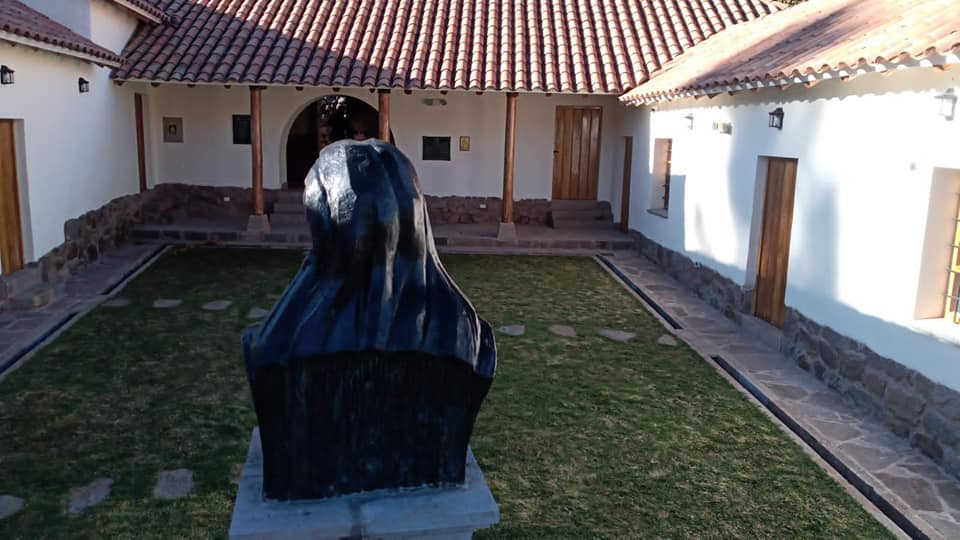
Interior of the house of José Gabriel Tupac Amaru II in Surimana.

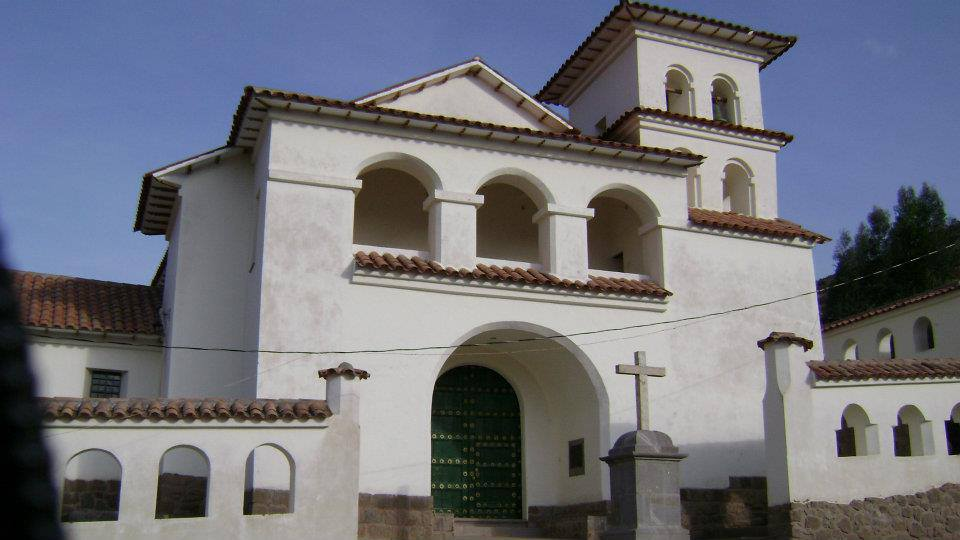
Colonial temple of Nuestra Señora de la Purificación de Surimana.

The historic city of Surimana, during the colonial era, belonged to the corregimiento of Canas - Canchis. In the early years of the Republic of Peru, from April 26, 1822, to October 14, 1833, it was within the jurisdiction of the province of Tinta, today the district of Tinta, according to the decree of President José Bernardo de Tagle y Portocarrero, due to its ethnic, biographical, historical, and common cultural roots. Then, by Law No. 1352 dated October 14, 1833, the province of Tinta was divided into two provinces: Province of Canas with the capital Yanaoca and the Province of Canchis with the capital Sicuani. Since this event, Surimana has belonged to the province of Canas as it is within its jurisdiction.

Furthermore, with the promulgation of the law on August 13, 1834; by the law of January 17, 1863, it was already liberated and legally confirmed as belonging to the Province of Canas. It was recognized by Law No. 1963 dated September 1, 1941, with the creation of the District of Túpac Amaru, with the capital at Tungasuca, to which the historic city of Surimana belonged, along with its annex communities: Huaylluta, Panpahuasi, Ccochapata, Rosasani, and Llalla. It was also recognized in 1961 with Isaac Quispe Chino, a recognized native citizen of Surimana, promoted as a Municipal Agency with President Don Santiago Ccacya Chacca.

Currently, it has been unanimously approved by Law 00375 2021 that declares of national interest and public necessity the creation of the District "José Gabriel Tupac Amaru Noguera" of Surimana, in the province of Canas, Department of Cusco, in honor of the precursor of the emancipatory feat in Peru and Hispanoamerica.

The historic city of Surimana is located 132 km from the City of Cusco, within the province of Canas and the District of Tupac Amaru, founded on the banks of the Apurimac River, now promoted as the Apurimac Canyon. It is worth noting that it is a tourist city.

== Public institutions ==
Today, the City of Surimana has an Initial Educational Institution, with Educational Institution No. 156 116 Surimana; Inca Tupac Amaru II Surimana Educational Institution.

== Culture and customs ==
The city of Surimana offers a diversity of cultural and traditional customs, both civil and spiritual, such as: Large cattle, South American camelids, sheep, and horse fairs. Sports practice includes football, where inter-community, resident, and visitor championships are organized on July 15, as well as cyclist races, marathons along the Inca trails, and a great horse ride from the city of Surimana to the capital of the Province of Canas, Yanaoca.

The main event is a thanksgiving Mass to God in commemoration of the patronal feast of the Virgin of Carmen (an image found on a stone in the Ch'aichura hill (Curapata) where there used to be a chapel, the miraculous apparition of the Virgin of Carmen is an authentic divine manifestation, the Mother of Jesus Christ, who is the mediator and treasurer of all the graces granted to her people by the Son of God. Every year on July 16, the festival is held where young people perform traditional and customary dances in different categories, expressing their culture and spiritual unity, with the three best representations being classified. As indicated, there are native dances, with two comparsas named Qhapaq Qolla and K'achampa, dances that are performed each year at the festival in honor of the Mother of Jesus Christ. On the eve, there is the Albazos and Qh'apos entry with approximately 50 horses and 12 donkeys fully dressed with traditional adornments and garments, heading to the bullring, dancing and singing, visiting the devotees of the Virgin of Carmen, and concluding with preparations for the next day that continues with the bullfight, citizens say it used to last all week but now normally lasts three days.

On July 28, there is a civic parade of educational institutions, public institutions, communities, and neighborhoods. The commemorative festival of renown is on November 4 for the revolutionary feat of Inca José Gabriel Tupac Amaru Noguera, for which actresses and actors arrive to stage the beginning of the Revolution and the organization of the revolutionary feat, staging it in all the places and scenarios of the revolutionary feat in the same historic city of Surimana, with the presence of authorities from the Congress of the Republic, the Regional President, and mayors of the Province, District, and other organizations.

=== Festivals ===
- Anniversary of the historic town of Surimana, September 12
- March 19, birth of Inca José Gabriel Tupac Amaru Noguera
- May 18, 1781, in the Huaqaypata Square, Cusco
- Anniversary of the revolutionary feat on November 4 by José Gabriel Tupac Amaru Noguera and Micaila Bastidas Phuyuccahua
- July 16, the commemoration of the "Virgin of Carmen" patron saint of the City
- Commemoration of the Holy Cross
- Protagonist Mg. Wilberth Ccacya Gonzales

== Geography ==
Region: Highlands, located in a warm area on the banks of the Apurimac River. The geographical location is: altitude of 3520–3610 m.a.s.l; latitude is 14° 9'12.69"S and longitude 71°34'29.63"W.

=== Boundaries and political divisions ===
North: District of Pomacanchi, Province of Acomayo

South: Totora District of Livitaca, Province of Chumbivilcas

East: Tungasuca, District of Túpac Amaru

West: Sayhua, District of Pomacanchi, Province of Acomayo
