= Amaro =

Amaro may refer to:

== People ==
=== Individuals ===
- Amaro (surname)
- Amaro (Brazilian footballer) (1901-unknown), Amaro da Silveira, Brazilian football forward
- Mariano Amaro (1914-1987), Portuguese football midfielder
- Amaro (Angolan footballer) (born 1986), Amândio Manuel Filipe da Costa, Angolan football defender
- Saint Amaro, (born 1522-?) a semi-legendary Christian saint

=== Groups ===
- Amaro people, a community of Brazilian trans-Atlantic slave trade survivors and returnees to Nigeria who claim Afro-Brazilian and\or Afro-Cuban ancestry

== Places ==
- Amaro (commune), a municipality in Friuli-Venezia Giulia, Italy
- San Amaro, a municipality in Galicia, Spain
- Santo Amaro (disambiguation), several places with the name

== Other ==
- Amaro (liqueur), an Italian herbal liqueur
- O Crime do Padre Amaro, a novel by 19th-century Portuguese writer Eça de Queiroz
- El crimen del Padre Amaro, a 2002 Mexican film by Carlos Carrera
- Amaro, the main character of Bom-Crioulo

== See also ==
- Amaru (disambiguation)
