= Tupac (name) =

Tupac, Túpac or Tupaq (Quechua "a royal thing") is a defunct title used (similarly to Ras in the Ethiopian Empire) by the former Peruvian Inca Empire, and is used as a male name of Inca origin.

Notable people with the name include:

== Art ==
- Elliot Túpac (born Elliot Urcuhuaranga Cárdenas), Peruvian muralist and lettering artist

== Music ==
- Tupac Mantilla (born 1978), Colombian musician and percussionist
- Tupac Shakur (1971–1996), American rapper also known by the stage names "2Pac" and "Makaveli", named after Túpac Amaru II

== Leaders and politicians ==
=== Inca chiefs ===
- Túpac Inca Yupanqui or Tupaq Inka Yupanki (1471–1493), tenth Sapa Inka of the Incan Empire
- Túpac Amaru or Tupaq Amaru (died 1572), last indigenous leader of the Inca people in Peru
- Túpac Amaru II or Tupaq Amaru II (1742–1781), descendant of the Inca chief Tupac Amaru and leader of the 1780s uprising in colonial Cusco, Peru
- Túpac Huallpa or Tupaq Wallpa (d. 1533), Inca ruler

=== Bolivia ===
- Túpac Katari or Tupaq Katari (c. 1750–1781), leader of a rebellion of indigenous people in Bolivia

=== United States ===
- Tupac A. Hunter, (born 1973), former member of the Michigan Senate from 2007 to 2014

== See also ==
- Túpac Amaru (disambiguation)
- Túpac Amaru Revolutionary Movement, a communist guerrilla movement active in Peru from 1982 to 1997
- Túpac Katari Guerrilla Army, an indigenous guerrilla movement in Bolivia which was active during the 1990s
- Operation Tupac, a 1988 Pakistani covert military operation in Indian-controlled Kashmir
