= Santo Amaro =

Santo Amaro, Portuguese for "Saint Amaro", may refer to the following places:

== Brazil ==
- Santo Amaro, Bahia
- Santo Amaro da Imperatriz, Santa Catarina
- Santo Amaro das Brotas, Sergipe
- Santo Amaro do Maranhão, Maranhão
- Santo Amaro, a district in the city of São Paulo
- Santo Amaro, a subprefecture in the city of São Paulo
- Santo Amaro, São Paulo Metro station
- Santo Amaro, a neighborhood in Recife, Brazil

== Portugal ==
- Santo Amaro, a civil parish in the municipality of Sousel
- Santo Amaro (Vila Nova de Foz Côa), a civil parish in the municipality of Vila Nova de Foz Côa
- Santo Amaro, a civil parish in the municipality of São Roque do Pico, Pico, Azores
- Santo Amaro, a civil parish in the municipality of Velas, São Jorge, Azores

== São Tomé and Príncipe ==
- Santo Amaro, São Tomé and Príncipe

== See also ==
- Amaro (disambiguation)
