= Bleed India with a Thousand Cuts =

Pakistani military doctrine

Bleed India with a Thousand Cuts is a military doctrine followed by the Pakistani military against India. It consists of waging covert war against India using insurgents at multiple locations. According to scholar Aparna Pande, this view was put forward in various studies by the Pakistani military, particularly in its Staff College, Quetta. Peter Chalk and Christine Fair cite the former director of the Inter-Services Intelligence (ISI) explicating the strategy.

In a 1965 speech to the UN Security Council, Zulfikar Ali Bhutto, former Prime Minister and former President of Pakistan, declared a thousand-year war against India. Reetika Sharma writes that Pakistani Army Chief General Zia-ul-Haq gave form to Bhutto's "thousand years war" with the 'bleeding India through a thousand cuts' doctrine using covert and low-intensity warfare with militancy and infiltration. This doctrine was first attempted during the Punjab insurgency and then in Kashmir insurgency using India's western border with Pakistan. Pakistan has devised a strategy aimed at instigating religio-political turmoil in India's border states of Jammu and Kashmir and Punjab. This strategy involves supporting and fueling acts of terror-induced violence, with the explicit intention of causing significant problems for India.

== Origins ==
A political map of the Borders of India and its neighbors, showing the relative location of Pakistan

The origins of the strategic doctrine are attributed to Zulfikar Ali Bhutto, then a member of the military regime of the General Ayub Khan, who declared a thousand-year war against India during his speech to the United Nations Security Council in 1965. His plans for the 1971 war included severing the entirety of eastern India and making it a "permanent part" of East Pakistan, occupying Kashmir, and turning East Punjab into a separate 'Khalistan'. After the war ended with Pakistan's own dismemberment, he laid down the doctrine of continuing the conflict by "inflicting a thousand cuts" on India.

On 5 July 1977, Bhutto was deposed by his army chief General Zia-ul-Haq in a military coup before being controversially tried and executed.

Zia then assumed the office of President of Pakistan in 1978 and the thousand cut policy began taking shape. After the defeat of Pakistan in the 1971 war, Pakistan was divided and Bangladesh was created. The war clarified that Kashmir could no longer be taken from India by a conventional war. Zia implemented Bhutto's "thousand years war" with 'Bleed India Through A Thousand Cuts' doctrine using covert and low intensity warfare with militancy and infiltration.

== Punjab ==
Pakistan had been helping the Sikh secessionist movement in the Indian Punjab since the 1970s. Under Operation Tupac, reportedly conceived by then-President Zia-ul-Haq, the ISI was tasked with destabilizing and fragmenting India as a means of avenging Pakistan’s defeat in the 1971 war. As part of this strategy, the ISI is believed to have supported various militant organizations, including Lakhbir Singh Rode’s International Sikh Youth Federation (ISYF), the Khalistan Commando Force, Babbar Khalsa International, and the Khalistan Liberation Force led by Pritam Singh Sekhon. Since the early 1980s Pakistan's intelligence agency ISI created a special Punjab cell in its headquarters to support the militant Sikh followers of Bhindranwale and supply them with arms and ammunitions. Terrorist training camps were set up in Pakistan at Lahore and Karachi to train the young Sikhs. Hamid Gul (who had led ISI) had stated about Punjab insurgency that "Keeping Punjab destabilised is equivalent to the Pakistan Army having an extra division at no cost to the taxpayers."

On February 26, 2023, Punjab Chief Minister Bhagwant Mann asserted that Khalistan supporters were receiving financial support from Pakistan and various other nations. This statement comes against the backdrop of the prevailing unrest in the state, fueled by the recent actions of Khalistani sympathizer Amritpal Singh and his followers.

== Kashmir ==
After the conclusion of the Soviet–Afghan War, the fighters of the Sunni Mujahideen and other Islamic militants had successfully removed the Soviet forces from Afghanistan. The military and civil government of Pakistan sought to utilise these militants in the Kashmir conflict against the Indian Armed Forces in accordance with the "thousand cuts" doctrine so as to "bleed India", using Pakistan's nuclear arsenal as a shield. In the 1980s cross-border terrorism started in the Kashmir region as armed and well-trained groups of terrorists were infiltrated into India through the border. Pakistan officially maintained that the terrorism in Kashmir was "freedom struggle" of Kashmiris and Pakistan only provided moral support to them. But this turned out to be inaccurate as Director-General of Inter-Services Intelligence (ISI) stated in the National Assembly of Pakistan that the ISI was sponsoring this support in Kashmir.

According to a general involved with the "bleed India" strategy of infiltrating jihadists into Kashmir:

It kept 700,000 Indian troops and paramilitary forces in Kashmir at very low cost to Pakistan; at the same time, it ensured that the Indian Army could not threaten Pakistan, created enormous expenditures for India, and kept it bogged down in military and political terms.

In May 1998, India tested its nuclear weapons at Pokhran-II followed by Pakistani nuclear tests. The Infiltration of Pakistani soldiers disguised as Kashmiri militants into positions on the Indian side of the LOC, resulted in a geographically limited Kargil War, during which the Pakistani Foreign Secretary Shamshad Ahmed issued a veiled nuclear threat that, 'We will not hesitate to use any weapon in our arsenal to defend our territorial integrity.'

After the Kargil War in 1999, the Kargil Review Committee came out with a report which took reference to the concept of Pakistan bleeding India. In Chapter 12, "Could Kargil Have Been Avoided?", the report said that if the "Siachenisation" of Kargil had happened prior to the war, that if troops had been stationed there all year round along a wider area, it would have resulted in huge costs "and enabled Pakistan to bleed India".

On 13 December 2001 a terrorist attack occurred on the Indian Parliament (during which twelve people, including the five terrorists who attacked the building, were killed) and the Jammu and Kashmir Legislative Assembly on 1 October 2001. India claimed that the attacks were carried out by two Pakistan-based terror groups fighting Indian administered Kashmir, the Lashkar-e-Taiba and Jaish-e-Mohammad, both of whom India has said are backed by Pakistan's ISI a charge that Pakistan denied. The military buildup was initiated by India in response to the twin attacks leading to the 2001–02 India–Pakistan standoff between India and Pakistan. Troops were amassed on either side of the border and along the Line of Control (LoC) in the region of Kashmir. International media reported the possibility of a nuclear war between the two countries and the implications of the potential conflict on the American-led "Global War on Terrorism" in nearby Afghanistan. Tensions de-escalated following international diplomatic mediation which resulted in the October 2002 withdrawal of Indian and Pakistani troops from the international border.

In spite of grave provocations, the lack of military retaliation by India was seen as evidence of successful deterrence of India by Pakistan's nuclear capability. According to David A. Robinson the nuclear deterrence has encouraged certain Pakistani elements to further provoke India. He adds that an "asymmetric nuclear escalation posture" of Pakistan has deterred conventional military power of India and in turn has enabled Pakistan's "aggressive strategy of bleeding India by a thousand cuts with little fear of significant retaliation".

== Present ==
Presently, the militant Islamists extremists in Bangladesh and Pakistan, through designated terrorist groups such as Harkat-ul-Jihad al-Islami (HuJI), have joined forces to carry out terrorist attacks on India. In 2015, a Pakistani High Commission staff member who was an ISI agent in Bangladesh had to be withdrawn by Pakistan after his involvement in financing of terrorism activities and fake Indian currency note racket was reported by intelligence sources. He was involved in financing of terrorist organisations Hizb ut-Tahir, Ansarullah Bangla Team and Jamaat-e-Islami. In December 2015, another Pakistani diplomat, a second secretary in the high commission, was withdrawn for links with Jama'atul Mujahideen Bangladesh. The Daily Star reported that arrest of Pakistani citizens in Bangladesh with fake Indian currency was a "common phenomenon". In Bangladesh, HuJI-B provides a safe zone for training as well as help in crossing the border into India.

Pakistan has decided to bleed India with thousand cuts. It's the policy of Pakistan. The creation of Bangladesh, which happened with the help of India, was a very humiliating defeat for them, and they feel that this is one way of avenging that defeat. They are avenging this defeat by causing casualties to our security forces and creating mayhem amongst the people.

— Chief of the Indian Army General Bipin Rawat in September 2018

According to Pakistani commentator Pervez Hoodbhoy, "Pakistan's 'thousand cuts' policy is in shambles". The international community doesn't like the usage of term "jihad" and the term is often used by terrorist organisations to refer to their acts of terror which has led to the term being considered to be related with terrorism even though the term isn't exactly related with that. At the centre of the FATF vote was Hafiz Saeed, an internationally designated Pakistani terrorist, who India blames for various attacks in Jammu and Kashmir.

In an interview in May 2016, Pakistan's former ambassador to America, said:

Pakistan sees jihad as a low cost option to bleed India. The security apparatus views terrorism as irregular warfare. Islamabad feels this is the only way to ensure some form of military parity.

— Husain Haqqani, Pakistani diplomat in 2016, via Business Standard, Indo-Asian News Service

== See also ==
- Pakistan and state-sponsored terrorism
- India and state-sponsored terrorism
- India–Pakistan relations
- Cold Start (military doctrine)

== Bibliography ==
- Behera, Navnita Chadha (2007), Demystifying Kashmir, Pearson Education India, ISBN 978-8131708460
- Ganguly, Sumit (2016), Deadly Impasse, Cambridge University Press, ISBN 978-0-521-76361-5
- Haqqani, Husain (2010), Pakistan: Between Mosque and Military, Carnegie Endowment for International Peace, ISBN 978-0-87003-285-1
- Jaffrelot, Christophe (2015), The Pakistan Paradox: Instability and Resilience, Oxford University Press, ISBN 978-0-19-023518-5
- Pande, Aparna (2011). Explaining Pakistan's Foreign Policy: Escaping India. Taylor & Francis. ISBN 978-1-136-81894-3.
- Rashid, Ahmed (2012), Pakistan on the Brink: The future of Pakistan, Afghanistan and the West, Penguin Books Limited, ISBN 978-1-84614-586-5
