= Tinta District =

Coordinates: 14.1440°S 71.4055°W

Tinta
- District
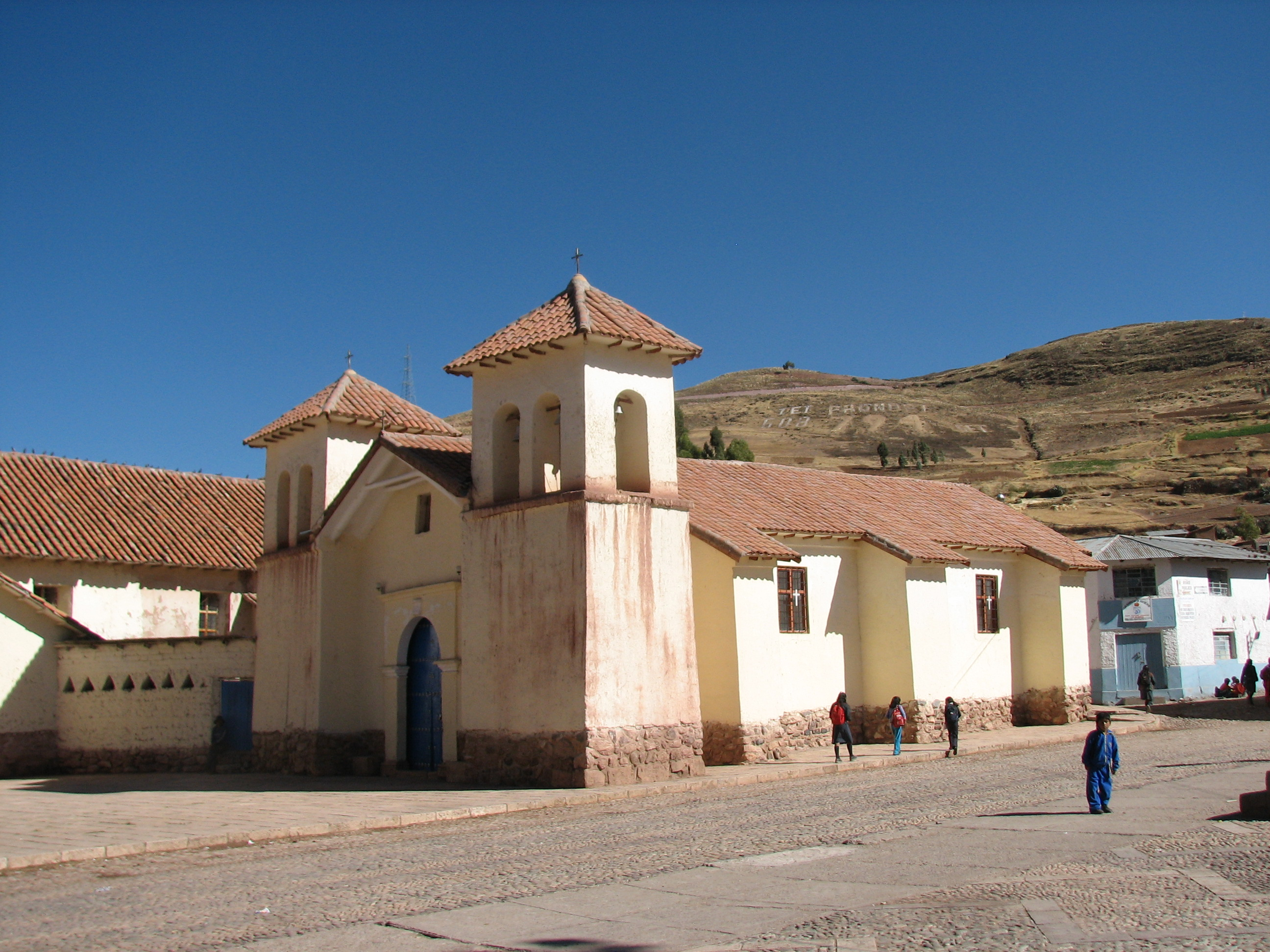
- Church in Tinta
- Interactive map of Tinta
- Country: Peru
- Region: Cusco
- Province: Canchis
- Capital: Tinta

Government
  - Mayor: Angel Gabino Manya Zavaleta

Area
  - Total: 79.39 km^{2} (30.65 sq mi)
- Elevation: 3,466 m (11,371 ft)

Population (2005 census)
  - Total: 6,152
  - Density: 77.49/km^{2} (200.7/sq mi)
- Time zone: UTC-5 (PET)
- UBIGEO: 080608

Tinta District is one of eight districts of the Canchis Province in Peru.

== Geography ==
The most important river of the district is the Willkanuta which crosses the district from south-east to north-west.

== Ethnic groups ==
The people in the district are mainly indigenous citizens of Quechua descent. Quechua is the language which the majority of the population (75.37%) learnt to speak in childhood, 24.33% of the residents started speaking using the Spanish language (2007 Peru Census).

== See also ==
- Kimsachata
