= Túpac Amaru (disambiguation) =

Túpac Amaru (1545–1572) was the last indigenous leader of the Inca empire.

Túpac Amaru may also refer to:

- Túpac Amaru II (1742–1781), Peruvian leader of an indigenous uprising
- Diego Cristóbal Túpac Amaru (1750–1783), succeeded Túpac Amaru II as the uprising's leader
- Andrés Túpac Amaru (1763–1786), nephew of Túpac Amaru II, fought in the uprising
- Túpac Amaru Revolutionary Movement, a Peruvian communist guerrilla group
- Tupac Amaru Hunter (born 1973), U.S. politician
- Tupac Amaru Shakur (1971–1996), American rapper

== See also ==
- Tupamaros, a Uruguayan communist guerrilla group
- Tupamaro (Venezuela), a political party of Venezuela until 2007
- Tupac (name), a given name (and list of people with that name)
