= Túpac Amaru District =

Coordinates: 14.1570°S 71.5049°W

Tupac Amaru Tupaq Amaru
- District
- Location of Tupac Amaru in the Canas province
- Country: Peru
- Region: Cusco
- Province: Canas
- Founded: September 1, 1941
- Capital: Tungasuca

Government
  - Mayor: Honorato Ttito Quispe (2007)

Area
  - Total: 117.81 km^{2} (45.49 sq mi)
- Elevation: 3,791 m (12,438 ft)

Population (2005 census)
  - Total: 3,423
  - Density: 29.06/km^{2} (75.25/sq mi)
- Time zone: UTC-5 (PET)
- UBIGEO: 080508

Tupac Amaru District is one of eight districts in the Canas Province in Peru. Its seat is the village of Tungasuca.

== Geography ==
One of the highest peaks of the district is Puka Kancha at approximately 4,400 m (14,400 ft). Other mountains are listed below:

- Anka Suka
- Ayna
- Hatun Ñan
- Pukara
- Suka
- Tunka Suka
- Wanu Kunka

== Ethnic groups ==
The people in the district are mainly indigenous citizens of Quechua descent. Quechua is the language which the majority of the population (97.85%) learnt to speak in childhood, 1.72% of the residents started speaking using the Spanish language (2007 Peru Census).
