= Amaro (surname) =

Amaro is a Spanish and Portuguese surname. Notable people with the surname include:

- André Amaro (born 2002), Portuguese footballer
- Joaquín Amaro (1889–1952), Mexican general
- Mariane Amaro (born 1993), French footballer
- Melanie Amaro (born 1992), American singer
- Rubén Amaro Jr. (born 1965), American baseball player, general manager, and coach
- Rubén Amaro Sr. (1936–2017), Cuban–Mexican baseball player
- J. C. Horner (born 1956), birth name of English Buddhist monk Ajahn Amaro
