= Túpac Amaru II =

Leader of an uprising in Peru

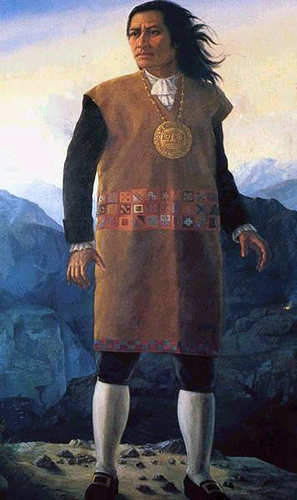
- Portrait of Amaru II

Sapa Inca of the Inca Empire
- Reign: c. November 4, 1780 – May 18, 1781
- Predecessor: Atahualpa (as legitimate Sapa Inca of the Inca Empire); Paullu Inca (as puppet Sapa Inca of the Inca Empire); Tupac Amaru I (as Sapa Inca of the Neo-Inca State); Juan Santos Atahualpa (as indirect predecessor)
- Born: José Gabriel Condorcanqui Noguera c. 1742; Surimana-Canas, Province of Cusco, Viceroyalty of Peru
- Died: May 18, 1781 (aged 39); Plaza de Armas, Cusco, Viceroyalty of Peru
- Cause of death: Hanged, drawn, and quartered
- Spouse: Micaela Bastidas (m. 1760; died 1781)
- Issue: Hipólito Túpac Amaru-Condorcanqui Bastidas; Mariano Túpac Amaru-Condorcanqui Bastidas; Fernando Túpac Amaru-Condorcanqui Bastidas

Túpac Amaru II (born José Gabriel Condorcanqui Noguera or José Gabriel Túpac Amaru, c. 1742 – May 18, 1781) was an Indigenous cacique who led a large Andean rebellion against the Spanish in Peru as self-proclaimed Sapa Inca of the new Inca Empire. He was later elevated to a mythical status in the Peruvian struggle for independence and indigenous rights movement, as well as an inspiration to myriad causes in Spanish America and beyond.

Of noble birth, he was a direct descendant of Túpac Amaru, the last Inca of Vilcabamba. He was educated in Cusco and inherited the curacazgo (chieftainship) of Surimana, Pampamarca, and Tungasuca after his father's death. He also amassed a fortune through muleteering, transporting goods and minerals in Upper Peru. As a curaca recognized by the colonial administration, he interceded between his communities and the colonial authorities, submitting petitions to alleviate the burdens of the indigenous tribute and the mining mita. His requests and demands for exemption were ignored in Tinta, Cuzco, and Lima. Consequently, on 4 November, 1780, after executing the corregidor Antonio de Arriaga, accused of repeated abuses, he began a rebellion seeking to restore justice for the Andean peoples. The rebellion spread through various regions of the Viceroyalty of Peru, extending to Upper Peru and the Viceroyalty of the Río de la Plata.

The movement of Túpac Amaru II was not initially an independence uprising but a rebellion against the abuses of the administrative and economic system imposed by colonial institutions, especially after the Bourbon Reforms. Its main objective was the abolition of oppressive practices such as the mining mita, the forced distribution of goods, the obrajes (textile workshops) and others, which primarily benefited Spaniards and Creoles at the expense of the indigenous population. On 16 November, 1780, Túpac Amaru II decreed the abolition of slavery for Black people for the first time in Spanish America. He was executed after the end of the rebellion in 1781.

Although Túpac Amaru II was not a precursor to independence in the modern sense, his 1780 rebellion has been the subject of multiple political reinterpretations. Over time, various governments and ideological movements, mainly within the nationalist or left-wing political spectrum, especially during the regime of Juan Velasco Alvarado (1968-1975), have turned him into a symbol of social justice. In contemporary Peru, Túpac Amaru II is invoked as a symbol of resistance.

== Early life ==
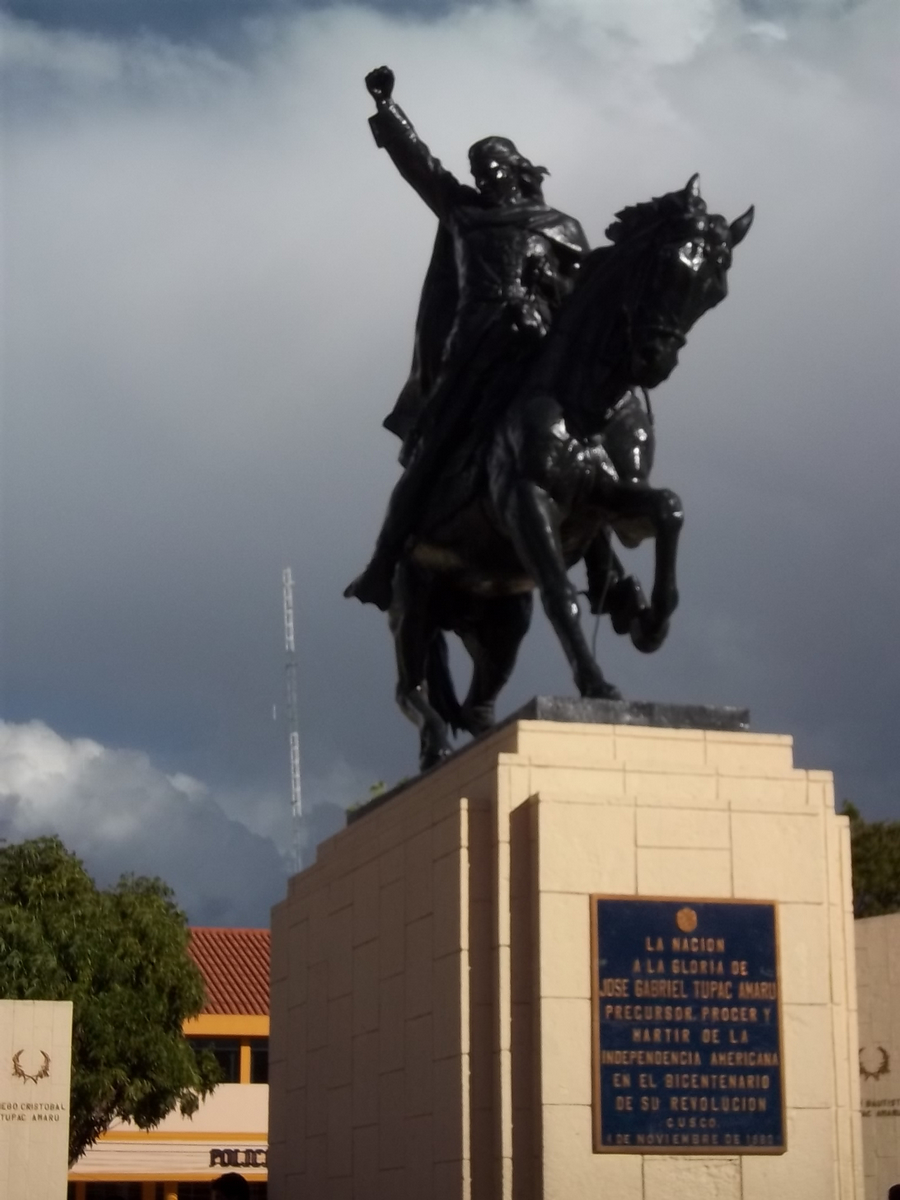
Current monument in Cusco, in homage to José Gabriel Túpac Amaru, in the square of the same name

Túpac Amaru II was born José Gabriel Condorcanqui Noguera in around 1742 in Surimana, Tungasuca, in the province of Cusco, to Miguel Condorcanqui Usquionsa Túpac Amaru, kuraka of three towns in the Tinta district, and María Rosa Noguera. On May 1, 1742, Túpac Amaru II was baptized by Santiago José Lopez in a church in Tungasuca. Prior to his father's death, Amaru II spent his childhood in the Vilcamayu Valley; he accompanied his father to community functions, such as the temple, the market, and processions. Túpac's parents died when he was twelve years old and he was raised by his aunt and uncle. When he was 16, he received a Jesuit education at the San Francisco de Borja School, founded to educate the sons of kurakas. The Jesuits "impressed upon him his social standing as future kuraka and someone of royal Inca blood." When he was 22, Amaru II married Micaela Bastidas. Shortly after his marriage, Amaru II succeeded his father as kuraka, giving him rights to land. Like his father, he was both the head of several Quechua communities and a regional merchant and muleteer, inheriting 350 mules from his father's estate. His regional trading gave him contacts in many other indigenous communities and access to information about economic conditions. His personal contacts and knowledge of the region were useful in the rebellion of 1780–1781.

He was recognised as an elite Quechua from a kuraka family and was educated at a school in Cuzco for sons of indigenous leaders. He spoke Quechua and Spanish and learned Latin from the Jesuits. He was upwardly socially mobile, and in Cuzco he had connections with distinguished Spanish and Spanish American (creole) residents. "The upper classes in Lima saw him as a well-educated Indian".

Between 1776 and 1780 Condorcanqui went into litigation with the Betancur family over the right of succession of the Marquisate of Oropesa and lost the case. In 1760, he married Micaela Bastidas Puyucahua of Afro-Peruvian and indigenous descent. Amaru II inherited the caciqueship, or hereditary chiefdom of Tungasuca and Pampamarca, two towns in modern-day Peru from his older brother, governing on behalf of the Spanish governor.

At the end of the 1770s, the trade relations between Buenos Aires and Upper Peru ended with the commercial monopoly of Lima, which caused greater competition for the manufacturers of Cuzco. They needed to sell their merchandise in Potosí, but had to compete with producers of Buenos Aires and Spain. On the other hand, the widespread overproduction throughout the Andes pushed prices down. Furthermore, in the years 1778 and 1779, extremely cold weather damaged crops and made travel difficult. In 1780, Amaru, who also experienced this crisis, had considerable resources but also numerous debts. He also witnessed the economic discomforts the others were going through, from merchants who were on the brink of bankruptcy to communities that could not afford the growing tribute.

Condorcanqui lived the typical situation of the kurakas (tribal chiefs): he had to mediate between the local commander and the indigenous people in his charge. However, he was affected, like the rest of the population, due to the establishment of customs and the rise of the alcabalas (taxes). He voiced his objection against these issues. He also demanded that the indigenous people be freed from compulsory work in the mines. claims directed through the regular channels to the colonial authorities in Tinta, Cusco and later in Lima, obtaining negatives or indifference.

In addition, he adopted the name Túpac Amaru II, in honor of his ancestor Túpac Amaru I, the last Sapa Inca of the Neo-Inca State, seeking to be recognized for his royal Inca lineage.

== The Corregidores and the exploitation of the natives ==
Although the Spanish trusteeship labor system, or encomienda, had been abolished in 1720, a seventh of the population living in native communities (pueblos de indios) as well as permanent indigenous workers at the time living in the Andean region of what is now Ecuador and Bolivia, who made up nine tenths of the population, were still pushed into forced labor for what were legally labeled as public work projects. This shift from the encomienda to the state sponsored and controlled draft labor system consolidated the indigenous labor force in the hands of the local government and not in the individual encomenderos. Most natives worked under the supervision of a master either tilling soil, mining or working in textile mills. What little wage that was acquired by workers was heavily taxed and cemented Native American indebtedness to Spanish masters. The Roman Catholic Church also had a hand in extorting these natives through collections for saints, masses for the dead, domestic and parochial work on certain days, forced gifts, etc. Those not employed in forced labor were still subject to the Spanish provincial governors, or corregidores who also heavily taxed and overpriced commodities to any free natives, similarly ensuring their financial instability.

In addition, the middle of the 18th century mining production intensified, putting more and more of a burden on the mita, or draft labor, system. While Potosi's mining mita had already been dangerous and labor-intensive work as well as forcing a migration by both the native worker and sometimes their families to Potosi to work, the labor became more extractive during this time, even though no new veins of ore had been discovered. Indeed, many future rebellious areas centered around Potosi and the mining district.

Condorcanqui's interest in the Native American cause had been spurred by the re-reading of one of the Royal Commentaries of the Incas, a romantic and heroic account of the history and culture of the ancient Incas. The book was outlawed at the time by the Lima viceroy for fear of it inspiring renewed interest in the lost Inca culture and inciting rebellion. The marquis's native pride coupled with his hate for the Spanish colonial system, caused him to sympathize and frequently petition for the improvement of native labor in the mills, farms and mines; even using his own wealth to help alleviate the taxes and burdens of the natives. After many of his requests for the alleviation of the native conditions fell on deaf ears, Condorcanqui decided to organize a rebellion. He began to stall on collecting reparto debts and tribute payments, for which the Tinta corregidor and governor Antonio de Arriaga threatened him with death. Condorcanqui changed his name to Túpac Amaru II and claimed he was descended from the last Inca ruler, Túpac Amaru.

== Rebellion ==
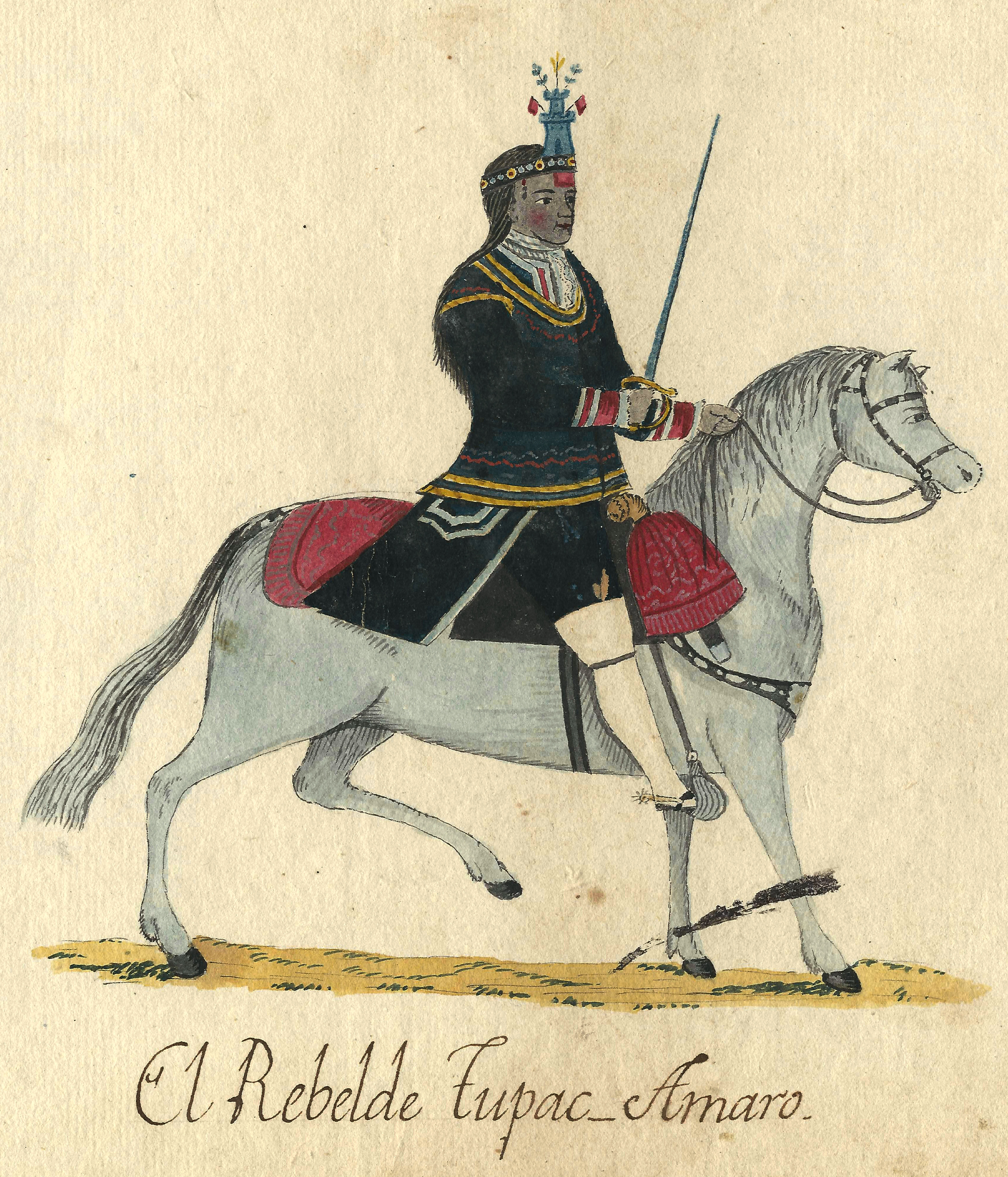
Painting of Túpac Amaru II by an anonymous artist c. 1784–1806. Unveiled in 2015, it is the oldest image known to date of the indigenous rebel.

The Rebellion of Túpac Amaru II began with the capture and killing of the Tinta Corregidor and Governor Antonio de Arriaga on November 4, 1780, after a banquet attended by both Túpac Amaru II and Governor Arriaga. The immediate cause of the rebellion lay in grievances caused by a series of modernising reforms of the colonial administration implemented by the Bourbon monarchy in Spain under Charles III of Spain (1759–1788), centralising administrative and economic control and placing heavier taxes and labour burdens on both the Native Peruvian and Creole populations. The focus of discontent was the main representative of the crown in Peru, the visitador general José Antonio Areche.

Ideologically, the rebellion was complex. At one level, it expressed simply a demand on the Spanish authorities for changes and reforms within the structure of colonial rule, often speaking in the name of the king himself, for example. At another, it envisioned an overthrow of European rule and something like a restoration of the pre-conquest Inca empire, the Tahuantinsuyo. Túpac Amaru's claim to be the legitimate descendant of the Inca suggested the possibility of an aristocratic state similar to the one envisioned in the sixteenth century by the mestizo writer, Inca Garcilaso de la Vega, who saw the Incas as sharing rule with the Spanish aristocracy. But there were also strong millenarian, proto-Jacobin and even proto-communist elements in the rebellion. In the main, the soldiers of the Tupamarista armies were poor Indian peasants, artisans and women, who saw the rebellion not so much as a question of reforms or power sharing but as an opportunity to "turn the world upside down". The restoration of the Inca Empire meant for them the possibility of an egalitarian society, based economically on the Inca communal agricultural system, the ayllu, and one without castas (racial divisions), rich and poor, or forced labour in haciendas, mines and factories, particularly the dreaded textile mills".

When Governor Arriaga left the party drunk, Túpac Amaru II and several of his allies captured him and forced him to write letters to a large number of Spaniards and kurakas. When about 200 of them gathered within the next few days, Túpac Amaru II surrounded them with approximately 4,000 natives. Claiming that he was acting under direct orders from the Spanish Crown, Amaru II gave Arriaga's slave Antonio Oblitas the privilege of executing his master. A platform in the middle of a local town plaza was erected, and the initial attempt at hanging the corregidor failed when the noose snapped. Arriaga then ran for his life to try to reach a nearby church, but was not quick enough to escape, and was successfully hanged on the second attempt.

After the execution of de Arriaga, Amaru II continued his insurrection. Releasing his first proclamation, Túpac Amaru II announced "that there have been repeated outcries directed to me by the indigenous peoples of this and surrounding provinces, outcries against the abuses committed by European-born crown officials... Justified outcries that have produced no remedy from the royal courts" to all the inhabitants of the Spanish provinces. He went on in the same proclamation to state, "I have acted ... only against the mentioned abuses and to preserve the peace and well-being of Indians, mestizos, zambos, as well as native-born whites and blacks. I must now prepare for the consequences of these actions." Túpac Amaru II then went on to quickly assemble an army of 6,000 natives who had abandoned their work to join the revolt. As they marched towards Cuzco, the rebels occupied the provinces of Quispicanchis, Tinta, Cotabambas, Calca, and Chumbivilcas. The rebels looted the Spaniards' houses and killed their occupants. The movement was supremely anti-royalist since, upon arriving at a town, the rebels would upturn Spanish authority.

"Women, as much as men, were affected by these injustices." Reflecting this, Túpac Amaru II's wife, Micaela Bastidas, commanded a battalion of insurgents and was responsible for the uprising in the San Felipe de Tungasuca region. She is also often credited as being more daring and a superior strategist than her husband. Purportedly, she once scolded her husband for his weakness and refusal to set up a surprise attack against the Spaniards in Cusco to catch the weakened city defenders off guard. Instead of listening to his wife, Túpac Amaru II lost precious time by encircling the country in hopes that he could gather more recruits for his army. By the time the insurgents had attacked the city, the Spaniards had already brought in reinforcements and were able to control and stop the uprising. This led to Túpac Amaru II, Micaela Bastidas, and several others to be captured while the rebels scattered.

During a stage of his rebellion, Túpac Amaru II was able to convince the Quechua speakers to join him. Therefore, under his command, the Quechua speakers fought alongside him with Aymara-speaking rebels from Puno on Lake Titicaca and on the Bolivian side of the lake. Unfortunately, the alliance did not last that long and this led the Aymara leader, Túpac Katari, to lead his army alone which ultimately led to his capture in October 1781. His partner and female commander, Bartola Sisa, took control after his capture and lead an astonishing number of 2,000 soldiers for several months. Soon after that in early 1782, the Spanish military defeated the rebels in Peru and Bolivia. According to modern sources, out of the 73 leaders, 32 were women, who were all executed privately.

On November 18, 1780, Cusco dispatched over 1,300 Spanish and Native loyalist troops. The two opposing forces clashed in the town of Sangarará. It was an absolute victory for Amaru II and his Native rebels; all 578 Spanish soldiers were killed and the rebels took possession of their weapons and supplies. The victory however, also came with a price. The battle revealed that Amaru II was unable to fully control his rebel followers, as they viciously slaughtered without direct orders. Reports of such violence and the rebels' insistence on the death of Spaniards eliminated any chances for support by the Criollo class. The victory achieved at Sangarará would be followed by a string of defeats. The gravest defeat came in Amaru II's failure to capture Cuzco, where his 40,000–60,000 indigenous followers were repelled by the fortified town consisting of a combined force of loyalist Native troops and reinforcements from Lima. "After being repelled from the capital of the ancient Inca empire and intellectual hub of colonial Peru" Amaru and his men marched through the countryside attempting to recruit any native to his cause, in doing so bolstering his forces. Amaru II's army was surrounded between Tinta and Sangarara and he was betrayed by two of his officers, Colonel Ventura Landaeta and Captain Francisco Cruz, which led to his capture. When his captors attempted to procure the names of his rebel accomplices from him in exchange for promises, Amaru II scornfully replied "There are no accomplices here other than you and I. You as oppressor, I as liberator, deserve to die."

=== Execution ===
Amaru II was sentenced to be executed. He was forced to watch the deaths of his wife Micaela Bastidas, his eldest son Hipólito, his uncle Francisco Tupa Amaro, his brother-in-law Antonio Bastidas, and some of his captains before his own death.

On May 18, 1781, they were taken to the Plaza de Armas in Cuzco to be executed one by one. His son Hipólito first had his tongue cut out for having spoken against the Spanish, and then he was hanged. Micaela and José Gabriel were forced to witness the death of their son; Micaela was then made to climb to the platform. In front of her husband and her son Fernando, Micaela fought against her executioners until they finally subdued her and cut off her tongue. Her thin neck could not reach the winch, so they threw ties around her neck that pulled it from side to side to strangle her. They hit her with a club and finally killed her with kicks in the stomach and breasts.

The following is an extract from the official judicial sentence issued by the Spanish authorities which condemns Túpac Amaru II to torture and death. It was ordered that Túpac Amaru II be condemned to have his tongue cut out after watching the executions of his family and to have his hands and feet tied:

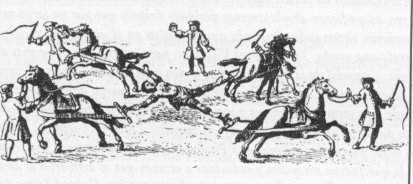
Attempt to dismember Túpac Amaru II.

...to four horses who will then be driven at once toward the four corners of the plaza, pulling the arms and legs from his body. The torso will then be taken to the hill overlooking the city... where it will be burned in a bonfire... Túpac Amaru's head will be sent to Tinta to be displayed for three days in the place of public execution and then placed upon a pike at the principal entrance to the city. One of his arms will be sent to Tungasuca, where he was the cacique, and the other arm to the capital province of Carabaya, to be similarly displayed in those locations. His legs will be sent to Livitica and Santa Rosas in the provinces of Chumbivilcas and Lampa, respectively.

— Sarah C. Chambers, South American Independence – An Anthology of Sources

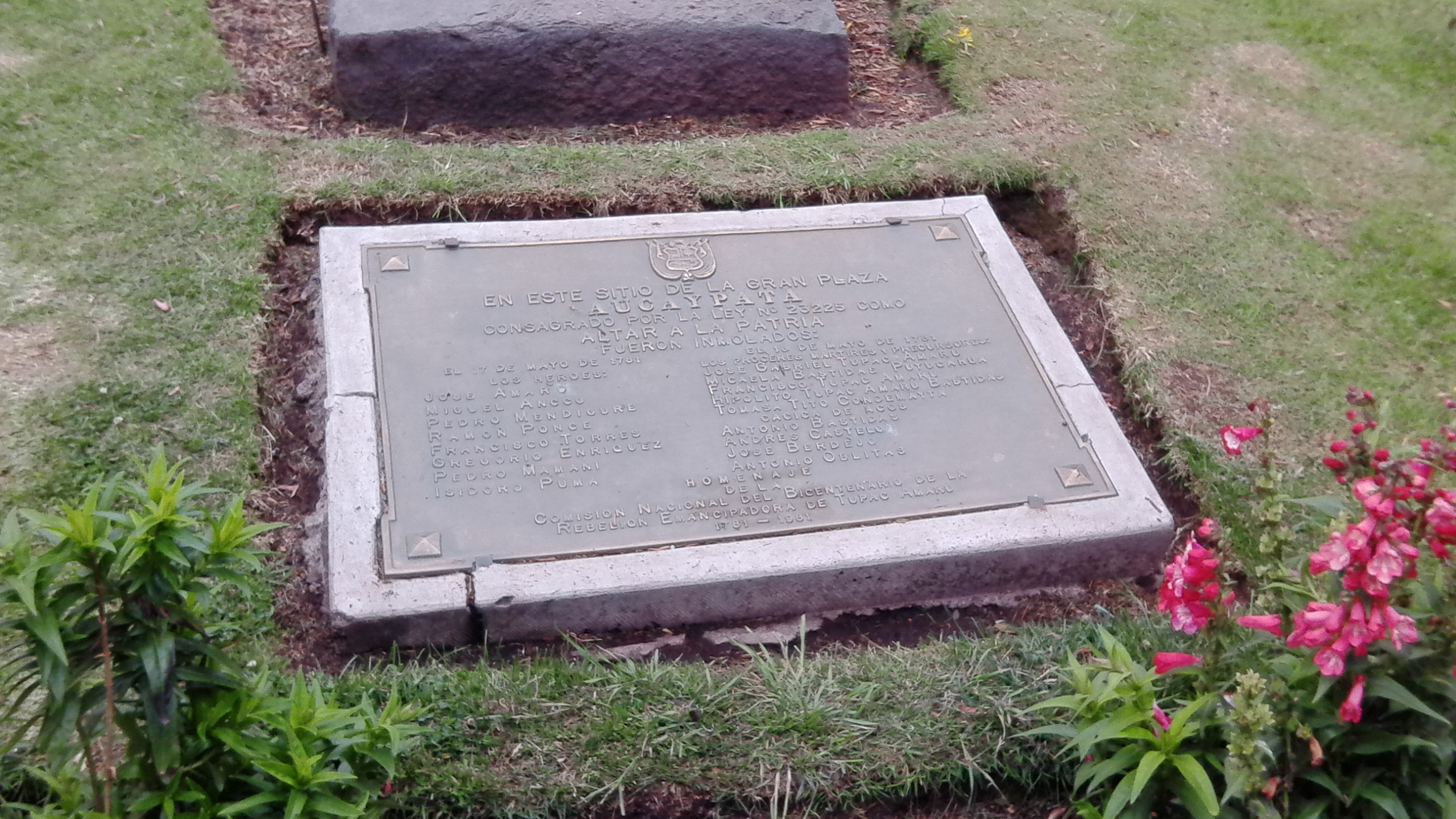
The tomb of Túpac Amaru II, located in the Plaza de Armas of Cuzco.

The dismemberment by horses failed, however, and his body was quartered manually, and it was then beheaded on the main plaza in Cuzco, in the same place his ancestor Túpac Amaru I had been beheaded. Scientists who have studied this dismemberment attempt concluded that due to the physical build and resistance of Túpac Amaru II, it would not have been possible to dismember him in that way. However, his arms and legs were dislocated, as was his pelvis.

His youngest son, 10-year-old Fernando, was not executed but was forced to witness the torture and death of his entire family and to pass under the gallows of those executed. He was later exiled to Africa on a sentence of life imprisonment. However, the ship taking him there capsized, and he ended up in Cádiz, to be imprisoned in the dungeons of the city. Viceroy Agustín de Jáuregui suggested that he should be kept in Spain, fearing that some enemy power might rescue him on the way to Africa.

Despite the execution of Túpac Amaru II and his family, the vice regal government failed to quell the rebellion, which continued under the leadership of his cousin Diego Cristóbal Túpac Amaru at the same time that it extended through Upper Peru and the Jujuy region. Likewise, disaffection of the Spanish Crown towards the Creoles became evident, especially for the Oruro Case. The lawsuit were filed against Juan José Segovia, born in Lima, and Colonel Ignacio Flores, born in Quito, who had served as president of the Real Audiencia of Charcas and as the Governor Intendant of La Plata (Chuquisaca or Charcas, currently Sucre).

=== Aftermath ===
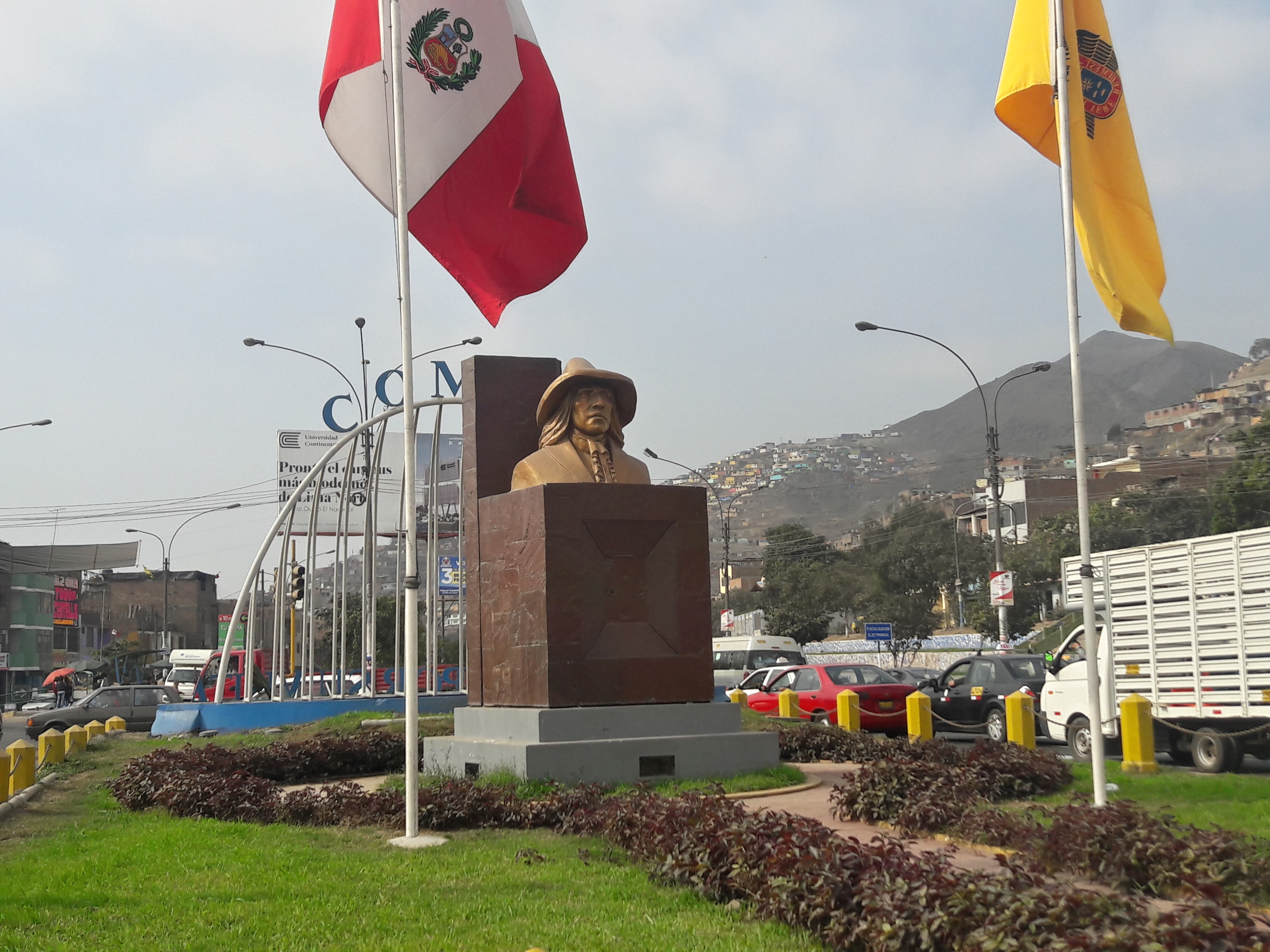
Tupac Amaru II Monument in the Comas and Independencia District, Lima.

When the revolt continued, the Spaniards executed the remainder of his family, except Fernando. Amaru's body parts were strewn across the towns loyal to him as ordered, his houses were demolished, their sites strewn with salt, his goods confiscated, his relatives declared infamous, and all documents relating to his descent burnt.

At the same time, on May 18, 1781, Incan clothing and cultural traditions, and self-identification as "Inca" were outlawed, along with other measures to convert the population to Western European Spanish culture and government until Peru's independence as a republic. However, even after the death of Amaru, Native revolts still seized much of what is today southern Peru, Bolivia and Argentina, as Native revolutionaries captured Spanish towns and beheaded many inhabitants. In one instance, a Native-American army under rebel leader Túpac Katari besieged the city of La Paz for 109 days before troops sent from Buenos Aires stepped in to relieve the city.

=== Consequences ===
Although Túpac Amaru II's rebellion was not a success, it marked the first large-scale rebellion in the Spanish colonies and inspired the revolt of many Natives and Peruvians in the surrounding area. The rebellion took on important manifestations in "Upper Peru" or what is today modern Bolivia including the region South and East of Lake Titicaca. Indeed, Túpac Amaru II inspired the indigenous peoples to such an extent that even the official document wherein he is condemned to death, it is remarked that "the Indians stood firm in the place of our gunfire, despite their enormous fear of it" and that despite being captured, his followers remained steadfast in their beliefs in his immortality and heritage.

The rebellion gave indigenous Peruvians a new state of mind, being a form of indigenous nationalism that would re-emerge repeatedly and change shape over the course of the country's future. At the same time, some Peruvians had prosperous businesses and land co-owned with the Spaniards, and therefore they did not want to lose those interests in the event of a revolution. Although Túpac Amaru II's revolt was put down relatively quickly, the legacy and ideology of his revolt had echoes throughout the Andean region.

== Recognition ==
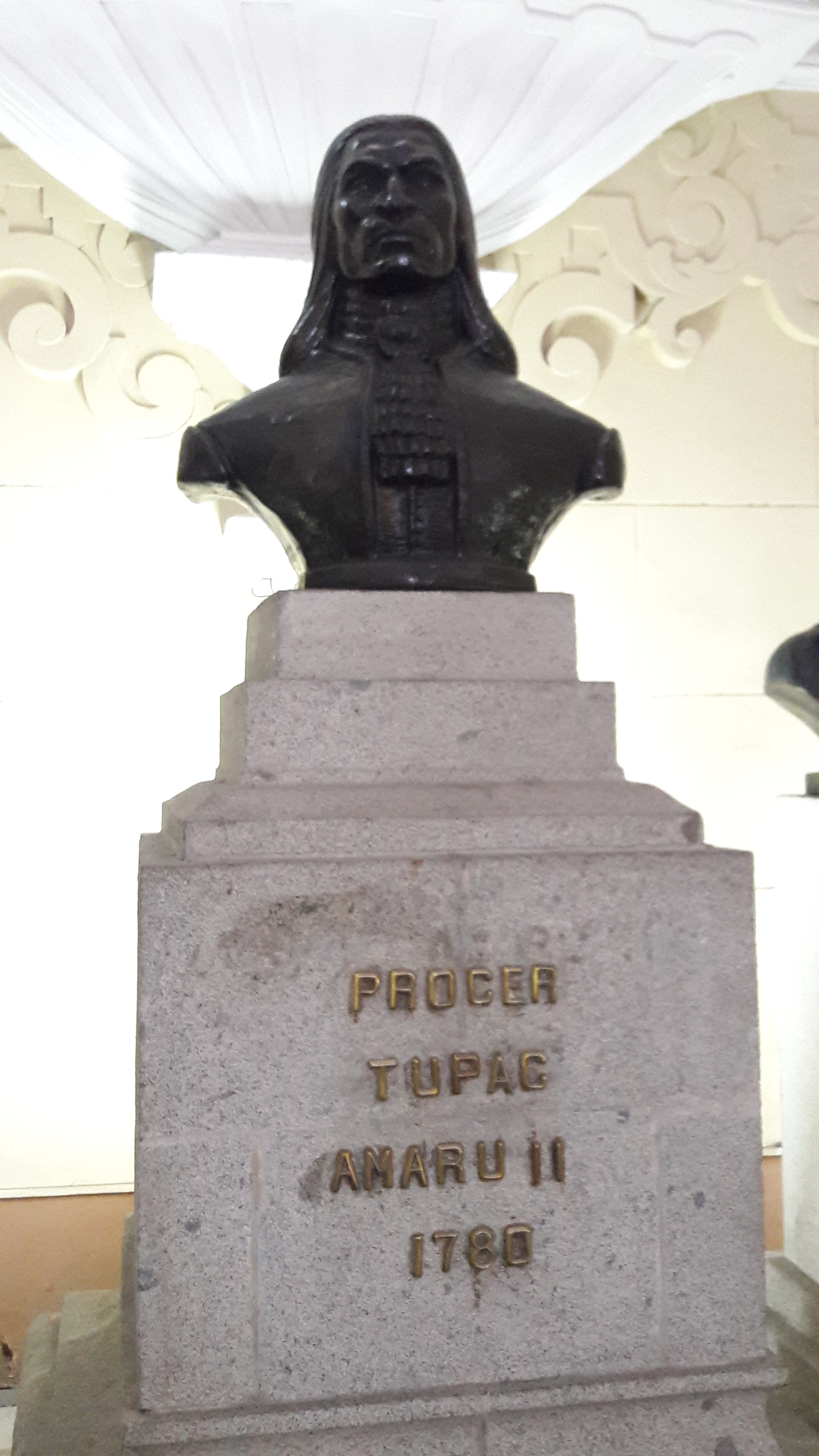
Effigy of Túpac Amaru II in the Panteón de los Próceres in Lima.

The fame of Túpac Amaru II spread to such an extent that for the indigenous rebels in the plains of Casanare in the New Granada region, he was recognized as "King of America".

Later movements invoked the name of Túpac Amaru II to obtain the support of the indigenous people, among others, Felipe Velasco Túpac Amaru Inca and Felipe Velasco Túpac Inca Yupanqui, who wanted to rise up in Huarochirí (Lima) in 1783. The rebellion of Túpac Amaru II marked the beginning of the Peruvian War of Independence in the history of Peru.

This great rebellion produced a strong influence on the Conspiracy of the Tres Antonios which came up in Chile on January 1, 1781, at the height of the insurrection. They were encouraged to act hearing the news of the advances of Túpac Amaru II in the Viceroyalty of Peru.

=== 20th and 21st centuries ===
In Peru, the government of General Juan Velasco Alvarado (1968–1975) welcomed the formalized effigy of Túpac Amaru II as a symbol of the Gobierno Revolucionario de la Fuerza Armada (Revolutionary Government of the Armed Forces) that he headed, to date, the only government of leftist ideology in the history of Peru. He recognized him as a national hero. In 1968, the symbol of Túpac Amaru II was carried by Peruvian education and official historiography, which was a novelty since independence. In his honor one of the main rooms of the Government Palace was named after him. That room was until then called the Francisco Pizarro room, and Pizarro's picture was replaced by that of the indigenous rebel.

== Legacy ==
=== In Peru ===
- During the Revolutionary Government of the Armed Forces (1968–1980), Túpac Amaru was selected by military leaders as the symbolic representation for the ideals behind the Peruvian Revolution.
- The Túpac Amaru Revolutionary Movement (MRTA) was a Peruvian Marxist-Leninist insurgent group, which became known worldwide for their involvement in the Japanese embassy hostage crisis.

=== Around the world ===
- In July 1943, Amaru II was portrayed by American actor Raymond Edward Johnson in Morton Wishengrad's radio drama, The Last Inca, the July 11 episode of Lands of the Free, a series produced by NBC's Inter-American University of The Air.
- The Tupamaros (also known as the National Liberation Movement) was the informal name of an urban guerilla that was active in the 1960s and early 1970s in Uruguay. The name was inspired by Tupac Amaru II and his ideals.
- The Venezuelan Marxist political party Tupamaro.
- Operation Tupac was launched by Pakistan against Indian-administered Kashmir.
- Chilean poet Pablo Neruda wrote a poem about Tupac Amaru II, titled "Tupac Amaru (1781)". The poem can be found in the Canto General.

=== In music ===
- Tupac Amaru, symphonic poem by the Venezuelan composer Alfredo del Mónaco premiered in 1977, has been performed at numerous international festivals.
- Tupac Amaru, symphony No. 5 by the Peruvian composer Armando Guevara Ochoa.
- In 1962, the trio Los Amaru de Tinta emerged, composed of three musicians from Tinta: Genaro Chacón, Roger Cusi, and David Fuentes.
- In 1968, Julián Yanque founded the Centro Folklórico Túpac Amaru deTinta (CEFOTAT), made up primarily of indigenous people from Tinta. The center's name was chosen in recognition of his admiration for the Quechua revolutionary.
- In 1989, the musical group Los Túpac Amarinos de Canas was formed, led by Gabriel Larota Catunta. This group is known for its revitalization of carnival traditions and the bandurria de canas (a type of Andean guitar).
- The song "Águila de thunder (part II)" from the album Kamikaze by Luis Alberto Spinetta is inspired by the figure of Tupac Amaru II.
- The French hip-hop group Canelason released a song called "Libre", which tells the story of this revolutionary and his tragic assassination.
- Polish reggae music band NDK in their song Mafija mentions Tupac Amaru II's death as an example of Catholicism's cruelty.
- Argentinian jazz musician Gato Barbieri's Fenix album begins with a song titled "Tupac Amaru".
- American rapper Tupac Amaru Shakur (born Parish Lesane Crooks) was named after him.
- This Is Not America (featuring Ibeyi) from Residente, mentions Tupac Amaru II stating that prior to modern rapper Tupac there was already a Tupac in America (in the context that there is not an "American country" but only an American continent).

=== In novels ===
- In the book, Inca Gold, by Clive Cussler, one of the main villains named himself Tupac Amaru and claims to be a descendant of the real Tupac Amaru.
- In the beginning of the book, The Book of Human Skin, Tupac Amaru II's death is described, and a book said to be a bound in his skin plays a major role in the plot.

== See also ==
- Túpac Katari
- Mateo Pumacahua
- Micaela Bastidas
