= Amarus =

Cantata by Leoš Janáček

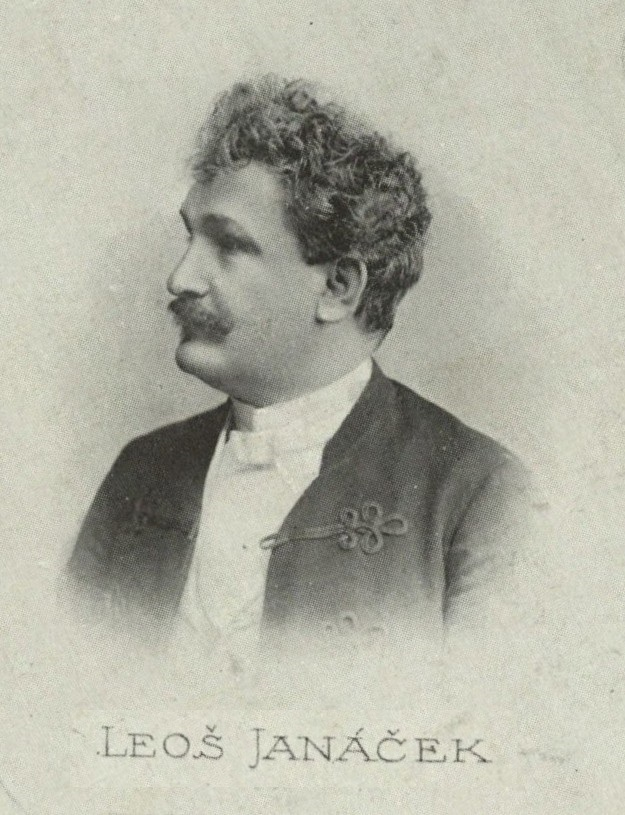
Leoš Janáček in 1899

Amarus is a cantata composed by Czech composer Leoš Janáček, consisting of five movements. It was completed in 1897, having been started after Janáček's visit to Russia the previous summer.

Amarus is a setting of the poem of the same name by Jaroslav Vrchlický, which tells the story of a young monk who had been abandoned at birth and brought up in a monastery. In June 1897, Vrchlický praised Janáček's setting of his poem, commenting: "I am convinced that you have succeeded in it entirely".

The work's premiere was in 1900, but a poor performance meant that it was not performed publicly again until fifteen years later.
