= Tupaç =

Tupaç Тупач
- selo
- Location within Tatarstan
- Country: Russia
- Region: Tatarstan
- District: Minzälä District
- Time zone: UTC+3:00

Tupaç (Tatar: Тупач, romanized: Tupaç) is a rural locality (a selo) in Minzälä District, Tatarstan. The population was 258 as of 2010. Tupaç is located 18 km from Minzälä, district's administrative centre, and 283 km from Qazаn, republic's capital, by road. The earliest known record of the settlement dates from 1719. There are 3 streets in the village.
