= Amaro, Friuli Venezia Giulia =

Amaro Damâr (Friulian)
- Comune
- Comune di Amaro
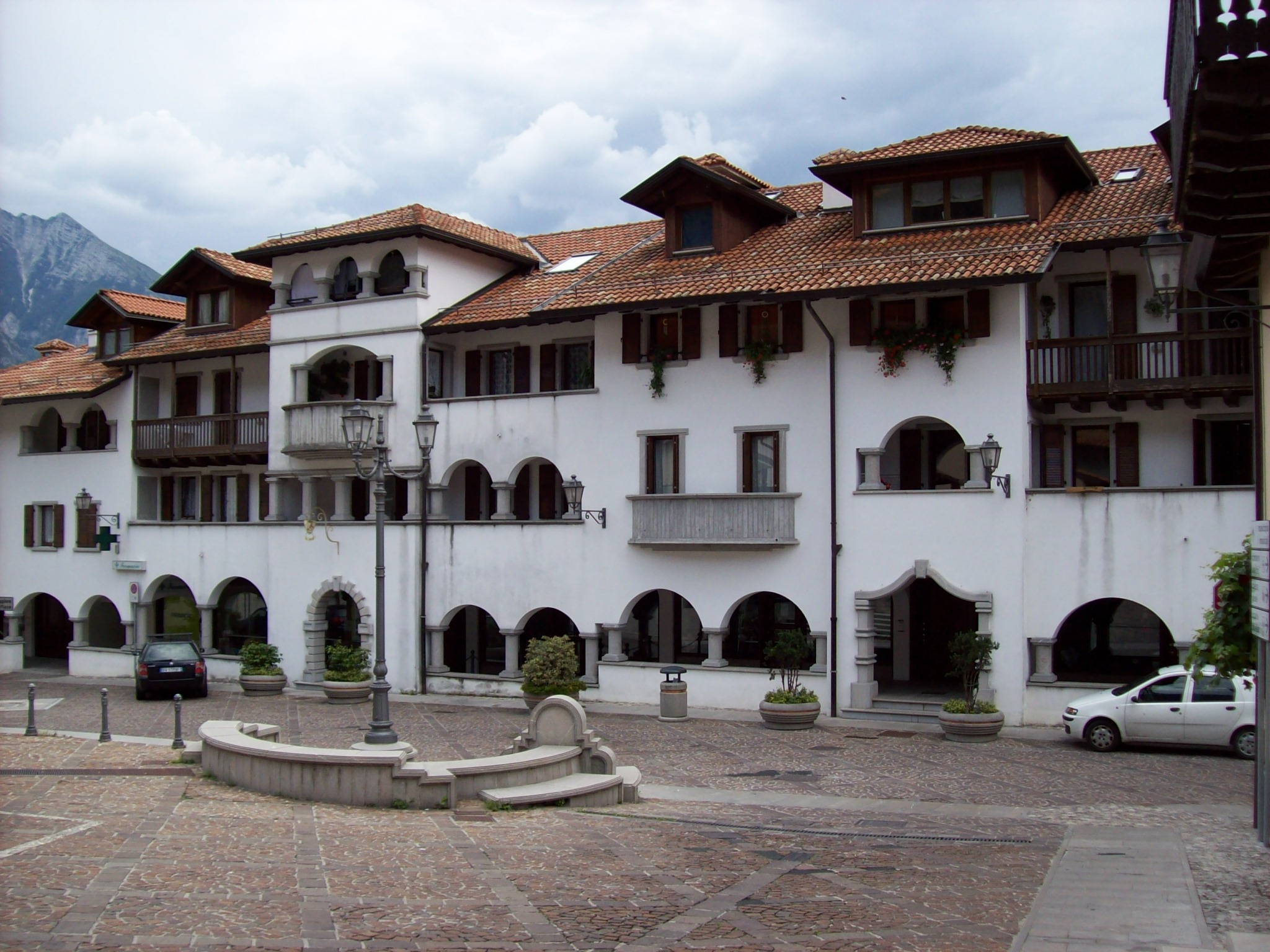

- Location of Amaro in Italy Amaro (Friuli-Venezia Giulia)
- Coordinates: 46°22′N 13°5′E
- Country: Italy
- Region: Friuli-Venezia Giulia
- Province: Udine (UD)

Government
  - Mayor: Laura Zanella

Area
  - Total: 33.2 km^{2} (12.8 sq mi)
- Elevation: 296 m (971 ft)

Population (1 January 2015)
  - Total: 830
  - Density: 25/km^{2} (65/sq mi)
- Demonym: Amaresi
- Time zone: UTC+1 (CET)
  - Summer (DST): UTC+2 (CEST)
- Postal code: 33020
- Dialing code: 0433
- Patron saint: St. Valentine
- Saint day: February 14
- Website: Official website

Amaro (Friulian: Damâr; Slovene: Amar) is a comune (municipality) in the Regional decentralization entity of Udine in the Italian region of Friuli-Venezia Giulia, located about 100 kilometres (62 mi) northwest of Trieste and about 35 kilometres (22 mi) northwest of Udine.

Amaro borders the following municipalities: Cavazzo Carnico, Moggio Udinese, Tolmezzo, Venzone.

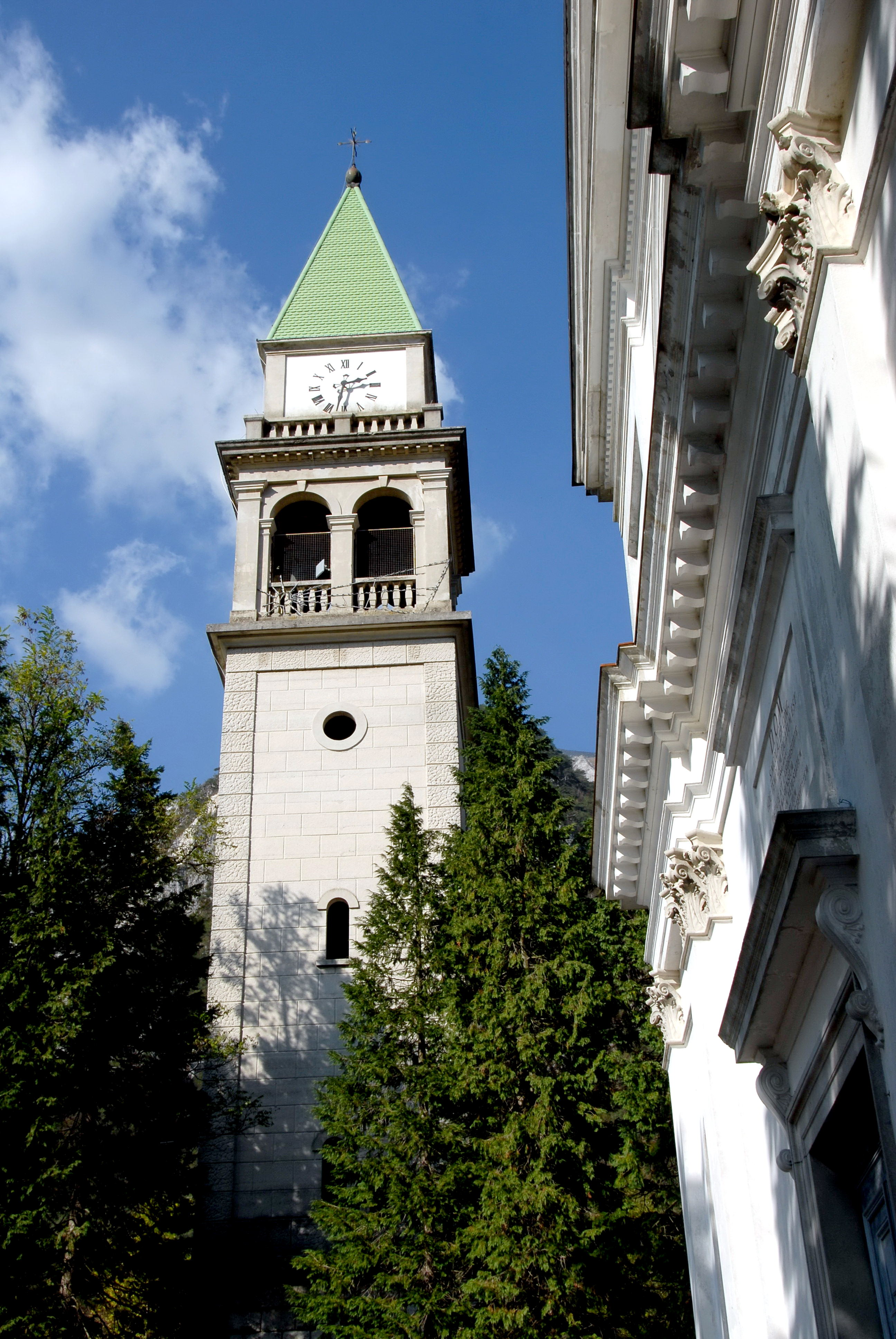
Parish Church of San Nicolò
