= Tunka Suka =

Mountain in Peru

- Location within Peru

Highest point
- Elevation: 4,000 m (13,000 ft)
- Coordinates: 14°09′57″S 71°29′13″W

Geography
- Location: Peru, Cusco Region, Canas Province
- Parent range: Andes

Tunka Suka (Aymara tunka ten, suka furrow, "ten furrows", hispanicized spelling Tunga Suca) is a mountain in the Andes of Peru, about 4,000 m (13,000 ft) high. It is located in the Cusco Region, Canas Province, Tupac Amaru District. Tunka Suka lies west of a town of that name (Tungasuca) and southwest of the large lake named Tunka Suka Quta in Aymara.
