= Operation Tupac =

Codename of a Pakistani ISI operation in India

- Part of Kashmir conflict and Indo-Pakistani wars and conflicts
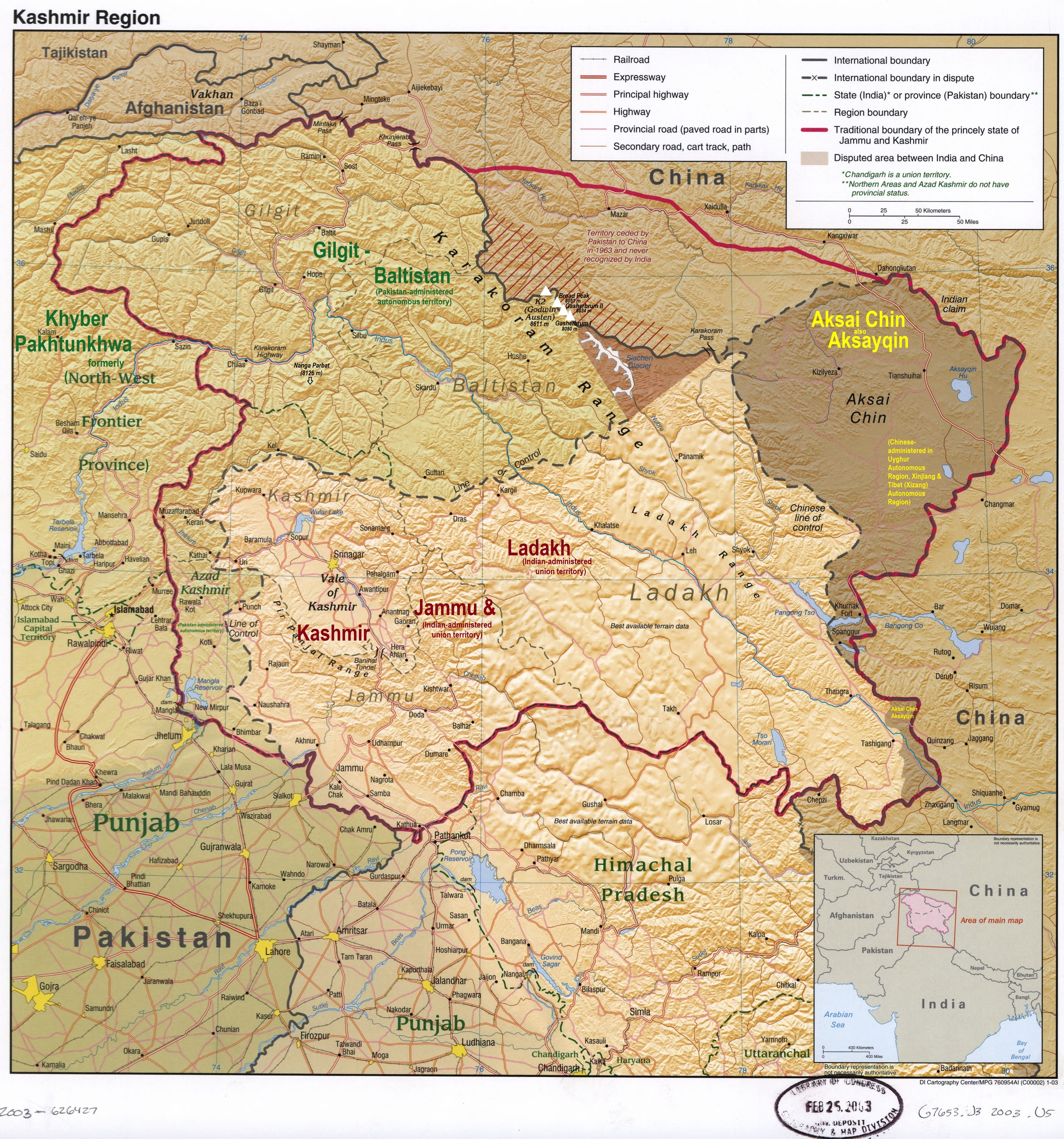
- CIA Map of the Kashmir region
- Operational scope: Provision of intelligence, funding and armaments for separatists and militants in Indian-administered Kashmir and India; Support anti-India separatist movements and militants and Islamist uprisings in India
- Type: Covert Military Intelligence Operation
- Location: Kashmir Valley
- Planned by: Pakistan
- Target: India
- Objective: Arm, train and finance militants in India
- Date: 1989–present
- Executed by: Inter-Services Intelligence (ISI)
- Outcome: Insurgency in Jammu and Kashmir (1989–present); Insurgency in Northeast India; Khalistan movement

Operation Tupac is the codename of an ongoing military-intelligence contingency program that has been active since the 1980s and run by Pakistan's main intelligence agency Inter-Services Intelligence (ISI). It has a three-part action plan to provide covert support to anti-India separatists and militants in the insurgency in Indian-administered Jammu and Kashmir. The program was authorized and initiated in 1988 by the order of the then-President of Pakistan, Muhammad Zia-ul-Haq.

== Background ==
The codename of the program is derived from the name of Túpac Amaru II, an 18th-century Peruvian revolutionary who led a large Andean uprising against Spanish colonial rule in Peru. The program is thought to be actively ongoing as the ISI has maintained its support for Kashmiri separatists, Islamists and other ideological militants in their fight against the Indian administration in Jammu and Kashmir.

After the Mujahideen victory against the Soviet Union occupation in Afghanistan, Mujahideen fighters, under the Operation Tupac with the aid of Pakistan, slowly infiltrated Kashmir with the goal of spreading radical Islamist ideology to wage jihad in Jammu and Kashmir.

While all Kashmiri separatist groups received funding and support, organizations that espoused an explicit pro-Pakistan stance in the Kashmir conflict were more heavily favoured by the Pakistani state. Under this program, the ISI helped create six separatist militant groups in Indian-administered Kashmir, including Lashkar-e-Taiba,. American intelligence officials have speculated that the ISI has continued to provide protection, support and intelligence to Lashkar-e-Taiba, among other militant groups in the region.

== Scope and objectives of the program ==
The primary objectives of Pakistan's Operation Tupac upon its execution were:

- to provide arms support and finance to separatists, militants and Islamists in India.
- to trigger a Balkanization of India.
- to utilize the spy network to act as an instrument of sabotage.
- to exploit porous borders with Nepal, Bangladesh, and Myanmar to set up bases and train anti-Indian militants to conduct operations against India.
- to install sleeper cells in India and its neighbour countries.

== ISI role ==
The Inter-Services Intelligence (ISI), the intelligence agency of Pakistan, has been involved in running military intelligence programs in India, with one of the subsections of its Joint Intelligence Bureau (JIB) department devoted to performing various operations in India. The Joint Signal Intelligence Bureau (JSIB) department has also been involved in providing communications support to Pakistani agents operating in regions of the Union Territory of Jammu and Kashmir of India. The Joint Intelligence North section of the Joint Counter-Intelligence Bureau (JCIB) wing deals particularly with India. In the 1950s the ISI's Covert Action Division was allegedly supplying arms to insurgents in Northeast India.

In 2011, the Federal Bureau of Investigation (FBI) said that the Inter-Services Intelligence (ISI) sponsors and oversees militancy in Kashmir.

Former Pakistan President General Pervez Musharraf in Oct 2014 said during TV interview, "We have source (in Kashmir) besides the (Pakistan) army...People in Kashmir are fighting against (India). We just need to incite them."

In 2019, Prime Minister of Pakistan Imran Khan publicly discouraged Pakistani people from going to Kashmir to do a jihad. People who went to Kashmir will do an "injustice to the Kashmiri people". Indian commentator Luv Puri claims most of the Pakistani militants who had crossed the border over the years and were caught by the Indian security forces were found to belong to the Punjab province of Pakistan.

India has also accused the ISI of reinvigorating separatism and insurgencies in the country via support to pro-Khalistan militant groups such as the International Sikh Youth Federation (ISYF), in order to destabilize India. A report by India's Intelligence Bureau (IB) indicated that ISI was "desperately trying to revive Sikh" militant activity in India. The ISI is also allegedly active in printing and supplying counterfeit Indian rupee notes.

In 2005, India’s Intelligence Bureau reported a resurgence of Sikh militancy in Punjab, noting that the ISI had tasked Lashkar-e-Taiba and five other groups with training members of the ISYF and Babbar Khalsa International in weapons handling and infiltration techniques via Jammu and Kashmir. The revival reportedly began in 2001, when recruits underwent a month-long training program in Pakistan.

== See also ==
- Inter-Services Intelligence activities in India, an overview of the covert activities of Pakistan's ISI within India
- Pakistan and state-sponsored terrorism, an overview of Pakistan's involvement with and exploitation of militant groups
- Bleed India with a Thousand Cuts, a doctrine of the Pakistani military
- Insurgency in Jammu and Kashmir, an ongoing militant uprising in Indian-administered Kashmir against Indian rule
