= Tiklla (disambiguation) =

Tiklla (Quechua for eyelash; two-colored, Hispanicized spellings Teclla, Ticcla, Ticlla) or Tiqlla (Quechua for 'with alternating colors') may refer to:

- Tiklla or Qutuni, a mountain in the Lima Region, Peru
- Tiklla (Castilla), a mountain in the Chachas District, Castilla Province, Arequipa Region, Peru
- Tiklla (Caylloma-Tuti), a mountain on the border of the Caylloma District and the Tuti District, Caylloma Province, Arequipa Region, Peru
- Tiklla (Lari), a mountain in the Lari District, Caylloma Province, Arequipa Region, Peru
- Tiklla (Qaqamayu), a mountain at the Qaqamayu in the Chachas District, Castilla Province, Arequipa Region, Peru
