= Sullucullahua =

Mountain in Peru

- Location within Peru

Highest point
- Elevation: 5,200 m (17,100 ft)
- Coordinates: 15°17′58″S 72°11′20″W

Geography
- Location: Peru, Arequipa Region
- Parent range: Andes, Chila

Sullucullahua (possibly from Quechua for sulluku local name for Sapindus saponaria, a tree, llawa broken glass with sharp edges) is a mountain in the Chila mountain range in the Andes of Peru, about 5,200 m (17,060 ft) high . It is located in the Arequipa Region, Castilla Province, Chachas District. Sullucullahua lies northeast of Chinchón and Aceruta and southeast of Huanca.
