= Asnohuañusja =

Mountain in Peru

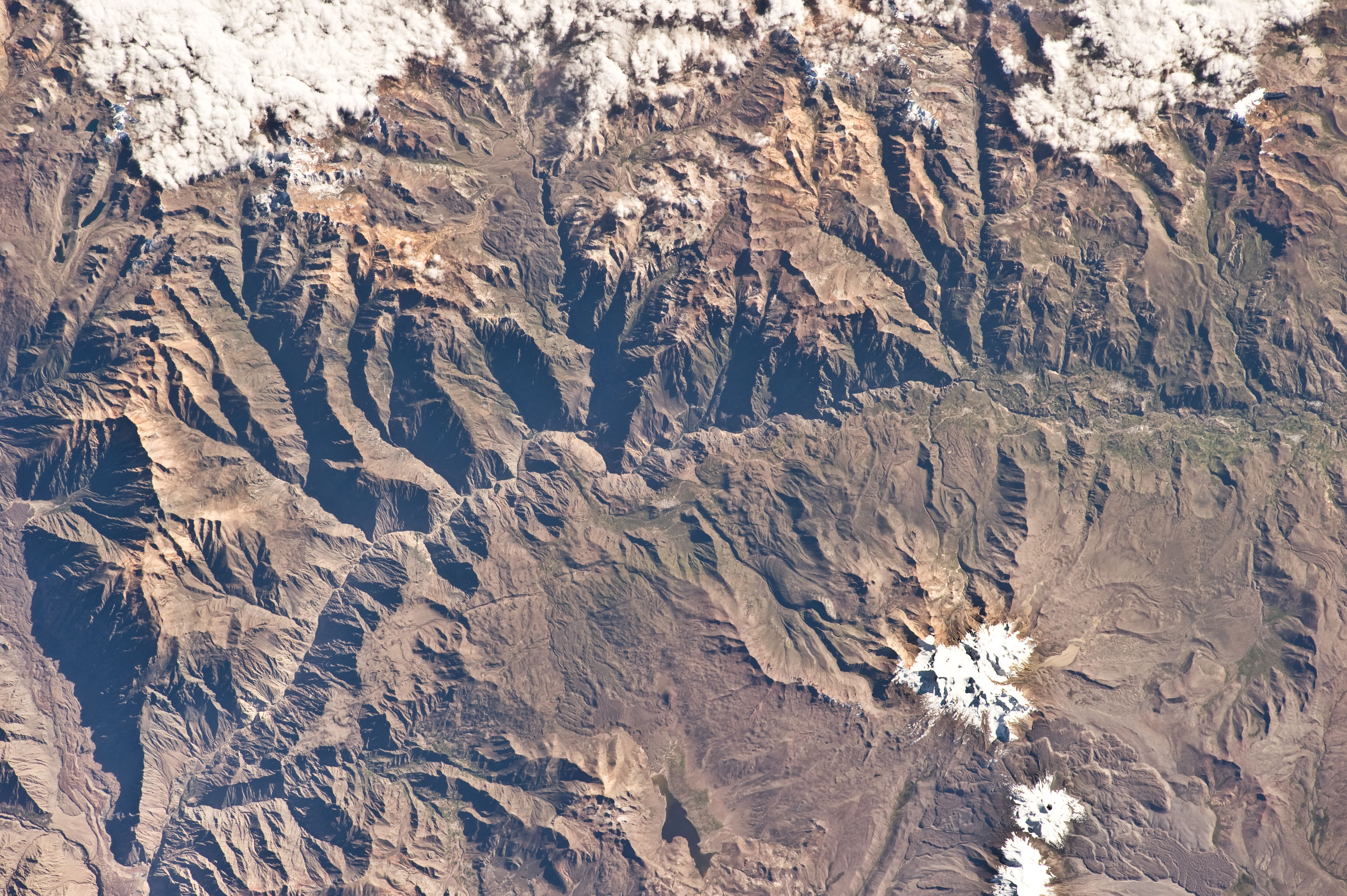
- The Colca River and Asnohuañusja northwest of it (upper left) as seen from the ISS

Highest point
- Elevation: 5,245 m (17,208 ft)
- Coordinates: 15°25′40″S 72°11′01″W

Geography
- Location within Peru
- Location: Peru, Arequipa Region, Castilla Province
- Parent range: Andes, Chila

Asnohuañusja (possibly from Quechua asnu donkey (from Spanish asno), wañuy die, -sqa a suffix (wañusqa died, dead)) is a 5,245-metre-high (17,208 ft) mountain in the western part of the Chila mountain range in the Andes of Peru. It lies in the Arequipa Region, Castilla Province, Chachas District. It is situated southwest of Chila and Choquepirhua, and northwest of Yuraccacsa.
