= Chachas District =

Coordinates: 15.5017°S 72.2719°W

Chachas
- District
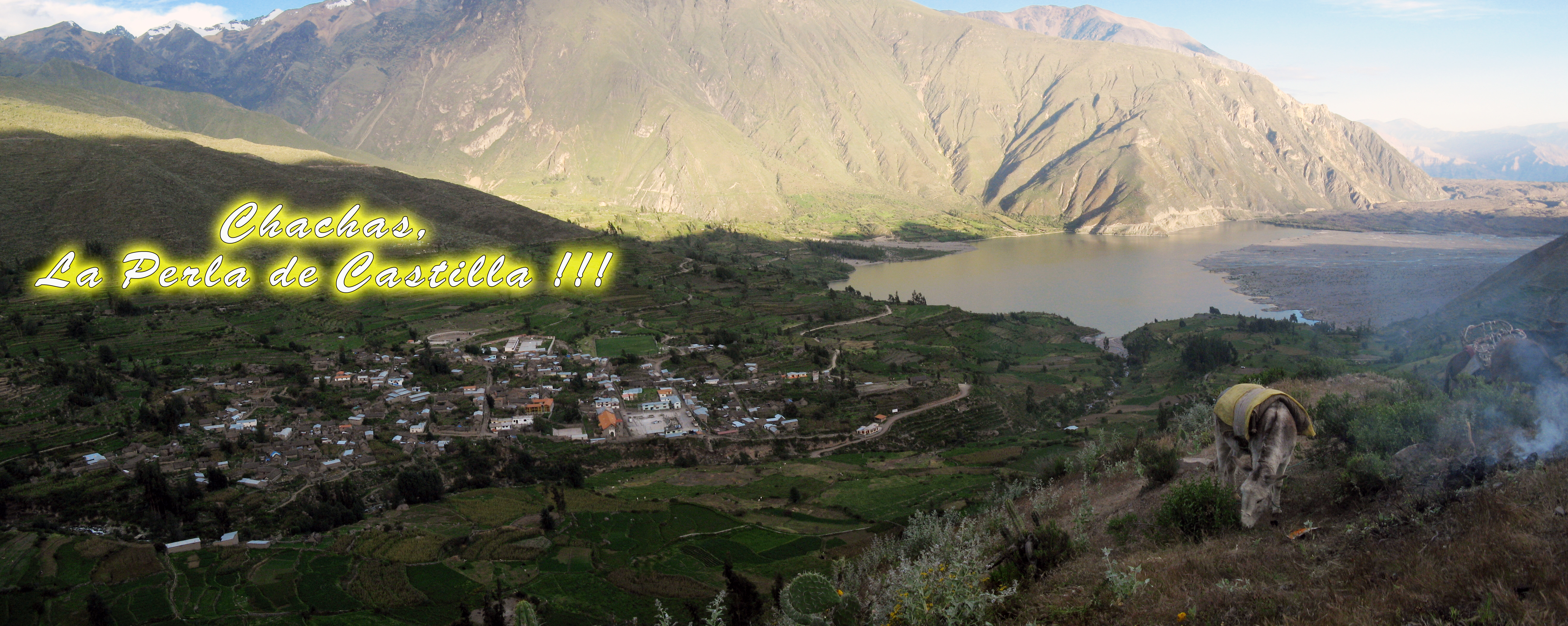
- The town Chachas and Chachas Lake
- Interactive map of Chachas
- Country: Peru
- Region: Arequipa
- Province: Castilla
- Capital: Chachas

Government
  - Mayor: Mario Cecilio Huayhua Funes

Area
  - Total: 1,190.49 km^{2} (459.65 sq mi)
- Elevation: 3,055 m (10,023 ft)

Population (2005 census)
  - Total: 1,992
  - Density: 1.673/km^{2} (4.334/sq mi)
- Time zone: UTC-5 (PET)
- UBIGEO: 040404

Chachas District is one of fourteen districts of the province Castilla in Peru.

== Geography ==
The Chila mountain range traverses the district. One of the highest mountains of the district is Chila at 5,654 m (18,550 ft) above sea level. Other mountains are listed below:

- Anta Pallqa
- Anta Saywa
- Apachita
- Apu
- Aqu
- Asiruta
- Asnu Wañusqa
- Chaka Chaka
- Challwani
- Chinchun
- Chuqi Pirwa
- Chila
- Chila Pilluni
- Ch'uwañuma
- Ch'uxña
- Ikma
- Janq'u Qala
- Japu
- Japutani
- Kawri Qhata
- Kuntur K'ark'a
- Kuntur Sinqa
- Kunturkhacha
- Lawa Lawa
- Markani
- Pallanka
- Pariwana
- Pillku Saywa
- Pilluni
- Puchka
- Puka Mawras
- Puka Ranra
- Phusuqu
- Qallwa
- Qaqa Mayu
- Qullpa Q'asa
- Qutu
- Q'asiri
- Q'illay Sirk'a
- Q'illu Q'illu
- Sama Q'asa
- Sani
- Sasawiri
- Sawsi
- Saywa Saywa
- Sirani
- Sulimana
- Sulluku Llawa
- Sunqu
- Tawqa
- Tiklla
- Tiklla (Qaqamayu)
- Tuqlla Tuqlla
- T'uqra T'uqra
- T'uqu Qaqa
- Ullu Ullu
- Uqhu K'uchu
- Uqi Uqi
- Waman Quri
- Wamanripayuq
- Wanqa
- Waña Qutaki
- Waña Q'awa
- Waykira
- Waylla Tarpuna
- Waylla Walla
- Wayllayuq
- Wayta
- Wayta Kuntur Sinqa
- Waywa Wawa
- Willkani
- Yana Qaqa
- Yuraq Q'asa

Machuqucha is the largest lake of the district. It lies on the border with the Orcopampa District.

== See also ==
- Chachas Lake
