= Ancocala (Peru) =

Mountain in Peru

- Location within Peru

Highest point
- Elevation: 4,776 m (15,669 ft)
- Coordinates: 15°06′34″S 72°07′30″W

Naming
- Language of name: Quechua

Geography
- Location: Peru, Arequipa Region
- Parent range: Andes, Chila

Ancocala (possibly from Aymara janq'u white, qala stone, "white stone") is a 4,776-metre-high (15,669 ft) mountain in the Chila mountain range in the Andes of Peru. It is situated in the Arequipa Region, Castilla Province, Chachas District. Ancocala lies southwest of Pillune and the lake named Machucocha.
