= Huanca (mountain) =

Mountain in Peru

- Location within Peru

Highest point
- Elevation: 5,200 m (17,100 ft)
- Coordinates: 15°17′15″S 72°11′35″W

Geography
- Location: Peru, Arequipa Region
- Parent range: Andes, Chila

Huanca (possibly from Aymara for a very big stone, or from Quechua for rock) is a 5,200-metre-high (17,060 ft) mountain in the Chila mountain range in the Andes of Peru. It is located in the Arequipa Region, Castilla Province, Chachas District. Huanca lies southwest of Huayllatarpuna and Condorcacha and northeast of Chinchón and Aceruta.
