= Apacheta (Arequipa) =

Mountain in Peru

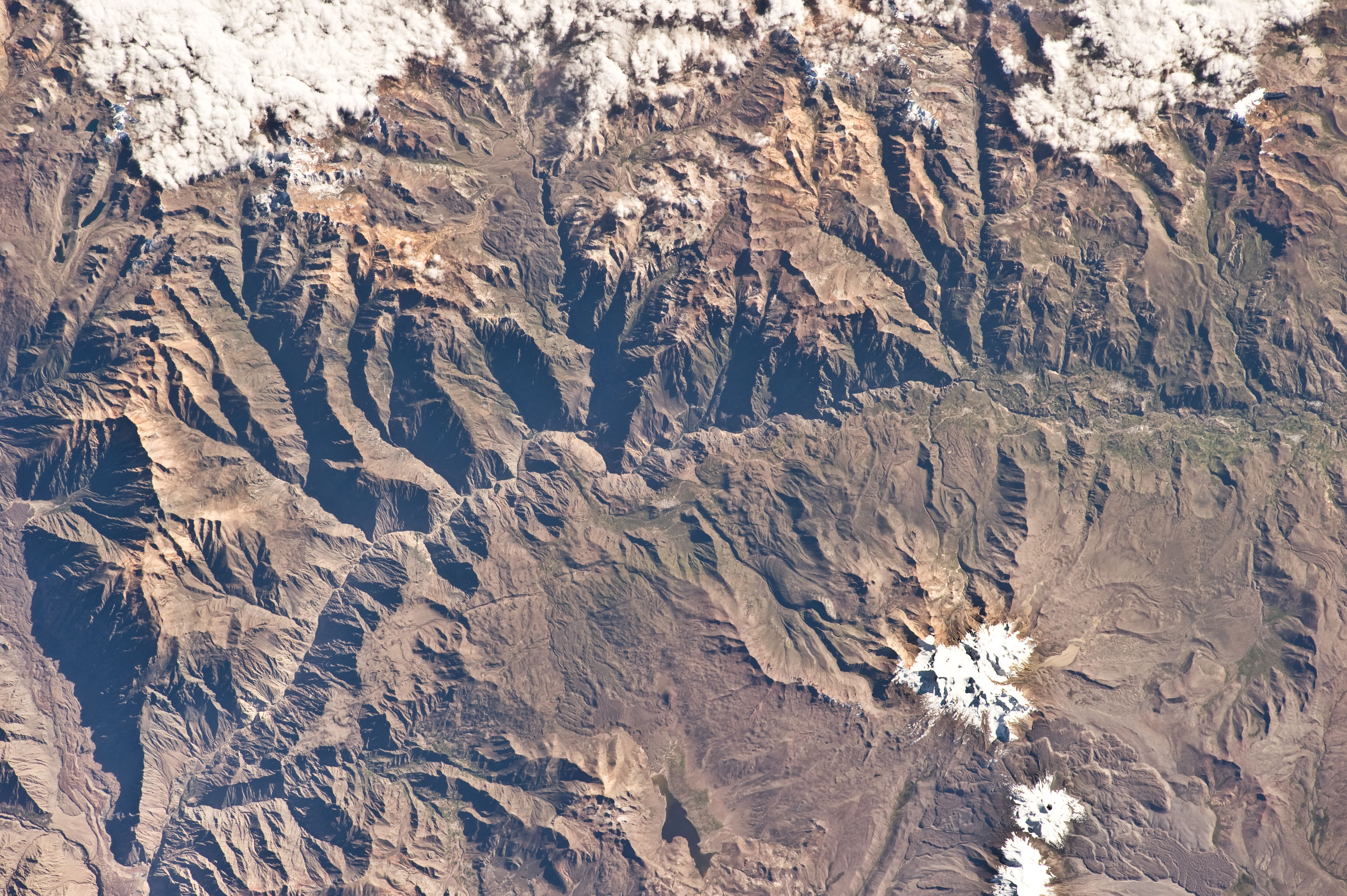
- The Colca River and Apacheta northwest of it (upper left) as seen from the ISS

Highest point
- Elevation: 5,328 m (17,480 ft)
- Coordinates: 15°23′03″S 72°10′44″W

Geography
- Location within Peru
- Location: Peru, Arequipa Region, Castilla Province
- Parent range: Andes, Chila

Apacheta (possibly from Aymara for the place of transit of an important pass in the principal routes of the Andes; name for a stone cairn in the Andes, a little pile of rocks built along the trail in the high mountains) is a 5,328-metre-high (17,480 ft) mountain in the western part of the Chila mountain range in the Andes of Peru. It lies in the Arequipa Region, Castilla Province, Chachas District. It is situated southwest of Chila, northeast of Chila Pillune and southeast of Yuaytacondorsenja.

Apacheta lies at the bank of the Cacamayo (possibly from Quechua for "rock river"). Its waters flow to the Molloco River in the east, a right affluent of the Colca River.
