= Huamangore =

Mountain in Peru

- Location within Peru

Highest point
- Elevation: 4,927 m (16,165 ft)
- Coordinates: 15°17′37″S 72°16′01″W

Geography
- Location: Peru, Arequipa Region
- Parent range: Andes, Chila

Huamangore (possibly from Quechua waman falcon, quri gold, "falcon gold") is a 4,927-metre-high (16,165 ft) mountain in the Chila mountain range in the Andes of Peru. It is located in the Arequipa Region, Castilla Province, on the border of the districts of Chachas and Orcopampa. Huamangore lies northwest of Huañacagua and Aceruta.
