= Huayta =

Mountain in Peru

- Location within Peru

Highest point
- Elevation: 5,400 m (17,700 ft)
- Coordinates: 15°19′28″S 72°11′51″W

Geography
- Location: Peru, Arequipa Region
- Parent range: Andes, Chila

Huayta (possibly from Aymara for a headdress made of feathers or flowers, Quechua for crest; wild flower; the whistling of the wind) is a mountain in the Chila mountain range in the Andes of Peru, about 5,400 m (17,717 ft) high . It is located in the Arequipa Region, Castilla Province, Chachas District. Huayta lies south of Huanca and Sullucullahua, northeast of Chinchón and southeast of Aceruta.
