= Chila mountain range =

Mountain range in Peru

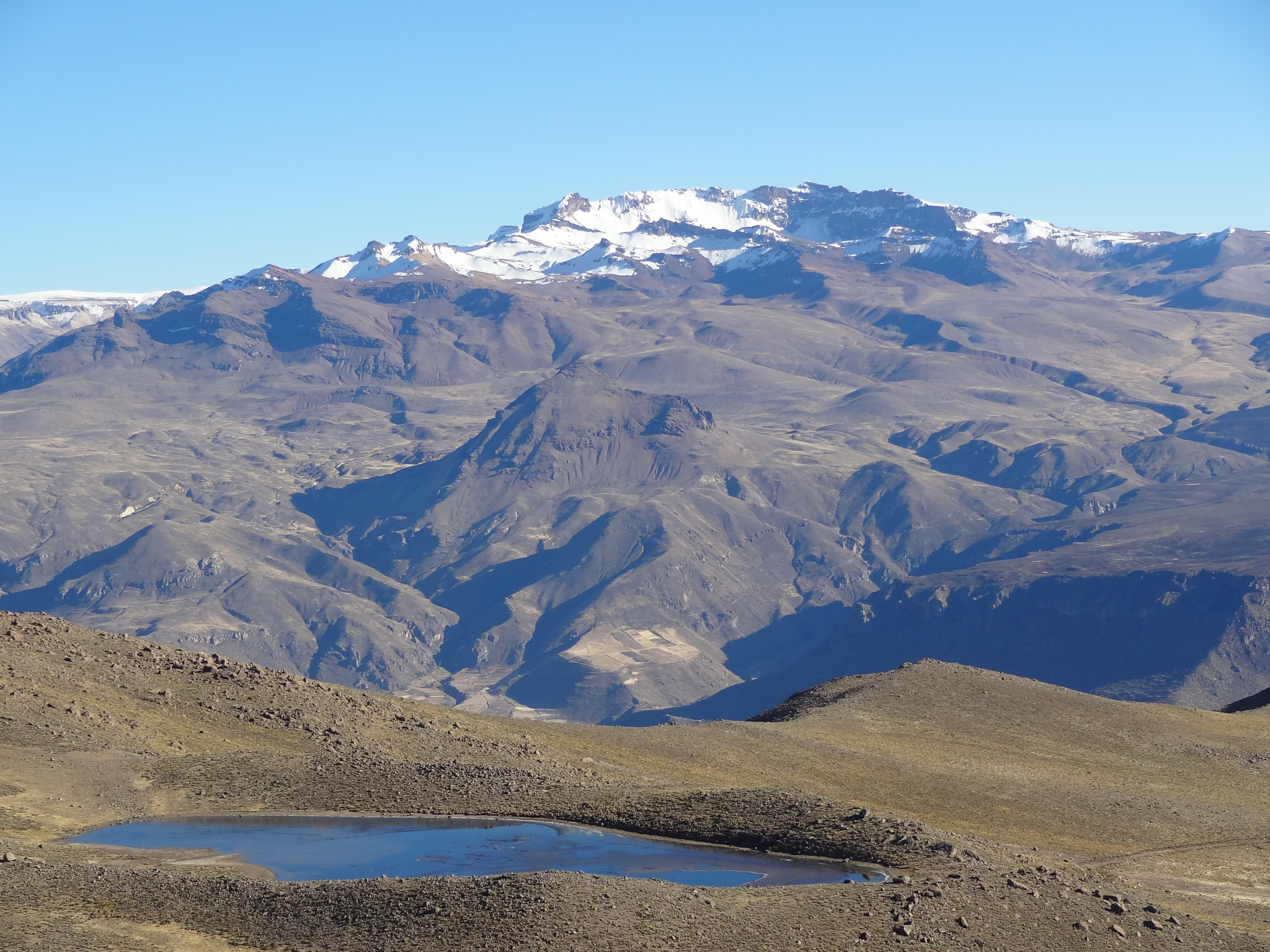
- Mismi behind the lake Limacota

Highest point
- Peak: Chila
- Elevation: 5,654 m (18,550 ft)

Dimensions
- Length: 80 km (50 mi) N-S

Geography
- Country: Peru
- Region: Arequipa Region
- Parent range: Andes

The Chila mountain range lies in the Arequipa Region in the Andes of Peru. It extends between 15°02' and 15°26'S and 71°43' and 72°37'W for about 80 km. The range is located in the provinces of Castilla and Caylloma.

== Mountains ==
The highest mountain in the range is Chila at 5,654 m (18,550 ft). Other mountains are listed below:

- Casiri, 5,647 m (18,527 ft)
- Mismi, 5,597 m (18,363 ft)
- Minaspata, 5,555 m (18,225 ft)
- Quehuisha 5,514 m (18,091 ft)
- Surihuiri, 5,506 m (18,064 ft)
- Yuraccacsa, 5,465 m (17,930 ft)
- Jatunpila, 5,450 m (17,880 ft)
- Airicoto, 5,400 m (17,700 ft)
- Aceruta, 5,400 m (17,700 ft)
- Chinchón, 5,400 m (17,700 ft)
- Choquepirhua, 5,400 m (17,700 ft)
- Chila Pillune, 5,400 m (17,700 ft)
- Chuañuma, 5,400 m (17,700 ft)
- Quiscapampa, 5,400 m (17,700 ft)
- Huayta, 5,400 m (17,700 ft)
- Teclla, 5,360 m (17,590 ft)
- Yuaytacondorsenja, 5,345 m (17,536 ft)
- Apacheta, 5,328 m (17,480 ft)
- Ticlla (Castilla), 5,303 m (17,398 ft)
- Huayllatarpuna, 5,300 m (17,400 ft)
- Huayllayoc, 5,300 m (17,400 ft)
- Jatunchungara, 5,287 m (17,346 ft)
- Ajo Colluna, 5,255 m (17,241 ft)
- Asnohuañusja, 5,245 m (17,208 ft)
- Solimana, 5,242 m (17,198 ft)
- Cerani, 5,229 m (17,156 ft)
- Japutani, 5,200 m (17,100 ft)
- Condor, 5,200 m (17,100 ft)
- Condorcacha, 5,200 m (17,100 ft)
- Colquere, 5,200 m (17,100 ft)
- Samacasa, 5,200 m (17,100 ft)
- Sillane, 5,200 m (17,100 ft)
- Sullucullahua, 5,200 m (17,100 ft)
- Huanca, 5,200 m (17,100 ft)
- Huañacagua, 5,200 m (17,100 ft)
- Huayllayoc, 5,200 m (17,100 ft)
- Yanajaja, 5,173 m (16,972 ft)
- Chila, 5,111 m (16,768 ft)
- Chuaña, 5,108 m (16,759 ft)
- Parhuayane, 5,100 m (16,700 ft)
- Huaillaccocha, 5,100 m (16,700 ft)
- Ojeccasa, 5,081 m (16,670 ft)
- Ticlla, 5,072 m (16,640 ft)
- Ccella Ccella, 5,049 m (16,565 ft)
- Chungara, 5,000 m (16,000 ft)
- Cairahuiri, 5,000 m (16,000 ft)
- Minasnioc, 5,000 m (16,000 ft)
- Pillune, 5,000 m (16,000 ft)
- Pucara, 5,000 m (16,000 ft)
- Posoco, 5,000 m (16,000 ft)
- Huallatane, 5,000 m (16,000 ft)
- Huamanripayoc, 5,000 m (16,000 ft)
- Puca Mauras, 4,955 m (16,257 ft)
- Huamangore, 4,927 m (16,165 ft)
- Icma, 4,800 m (15,700 ft)
- Hichocollo, 4,800 m (15,700 ft)
- Ticlla, 4,800 m (15,700 ft)
- Huancaitira, 4,800 m (15,700 ft)
- Ancocala, 4,776 m (15,669 ft)
- Puca Mauras, 4,262 m (13,983 ft)
