= Condor (mountain) =

Mountain in Peru

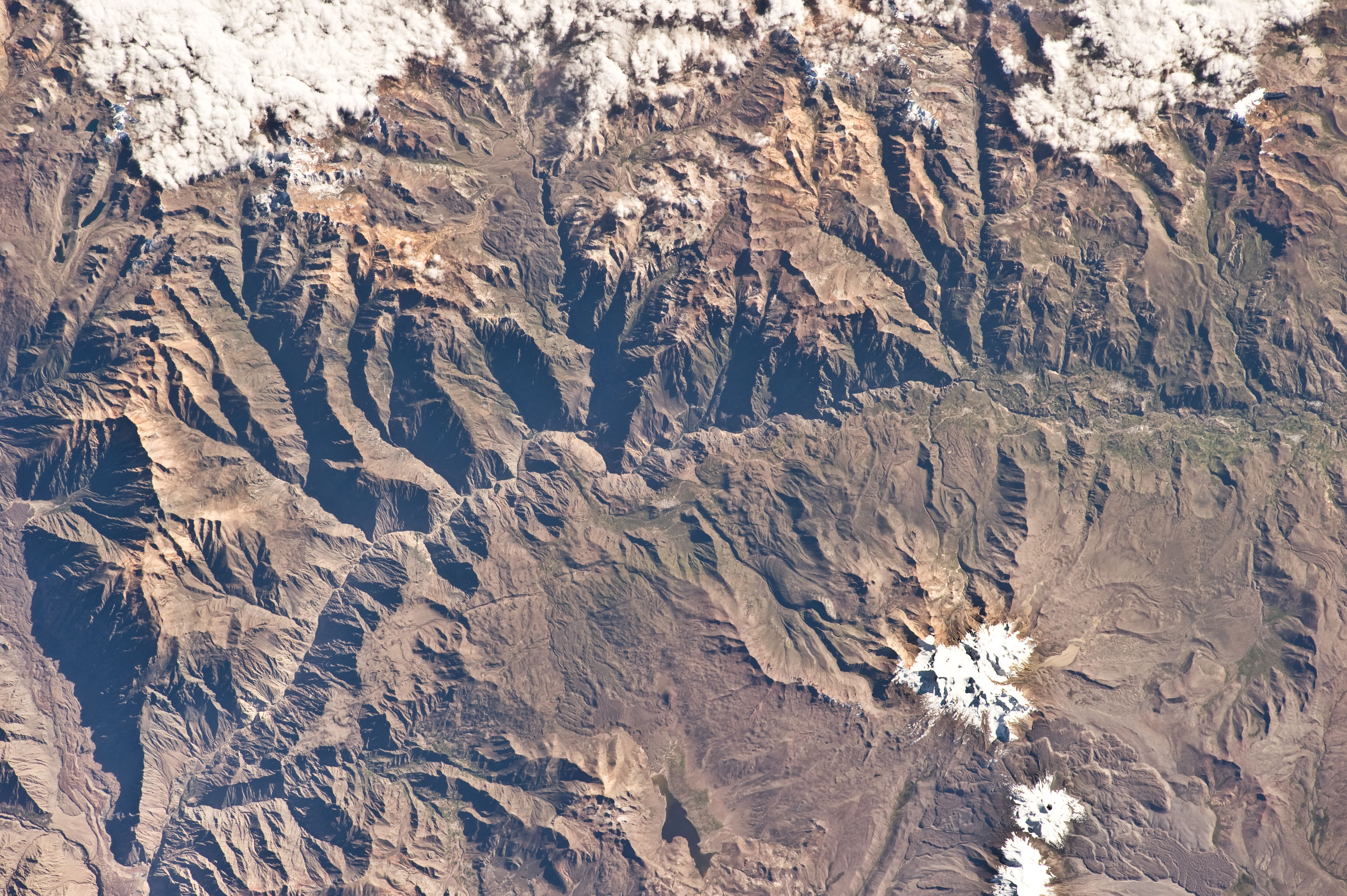
- The Colca River and Condor north of it (upper left) as seen from the ISS

Highest point
- Elevation: 5,200 m (17,100 ft)
- Coordinates: 15°24′56″S 72°3′49″W

Geography
- Location within Peru
- Location: Peru, Arequipa Region, Caylloma Province
- Parent range: Andes, Chila

Condor (possibly from Quechua for condor) is a mountain in the Andes of Peru, about 5,200 metres (17,060 ft) high. It is located in the Arequipa Region, Caylloma Province, Choco District. It lies in the Chila mountain range north of the Colca River. Condor is situated at the Umaranra valley. Its stream flows to the Collpamayo (possibly from Quechua for "salpeter river") whose waters feed the Colca River.
