= Qallwa =

Mountain in Peru

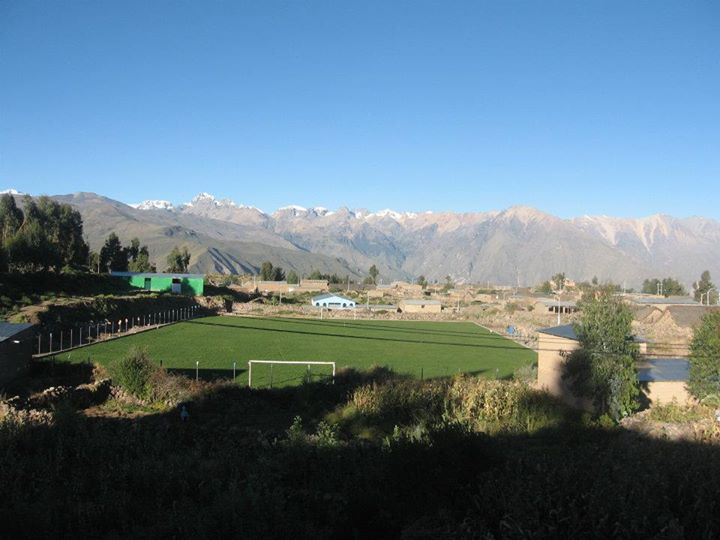
- Qallwa (on the right) as seen from Andagua

Highest point
- Elevation: 5,145 m (16,880 ft)
- Coordinates: 15°31′07″S 72°11′32″W

Naming
- Language of name: Quechua

Geography
- Location within Peru
- Location: Peru, Arequipa Region
- Parent range: Andes

Qallwa (Quechua for a little branch, also for an instrument out of wood or bones which the weavers use to press the threads of the cloth, Hispanicized spelling Jallhua) is a 5,145-metre-high (16,880 ft) mountain in the Andes of Peru. It is located in the Arequipa Region, Castilla Province, on the border of the districts of Ayo, Chachas and Choco. Its ridge extents from northeast to southwest. Qallwa lies southwest of Sirani and northeast of Sukna.
