= Samacasa =

Mountain in Peru

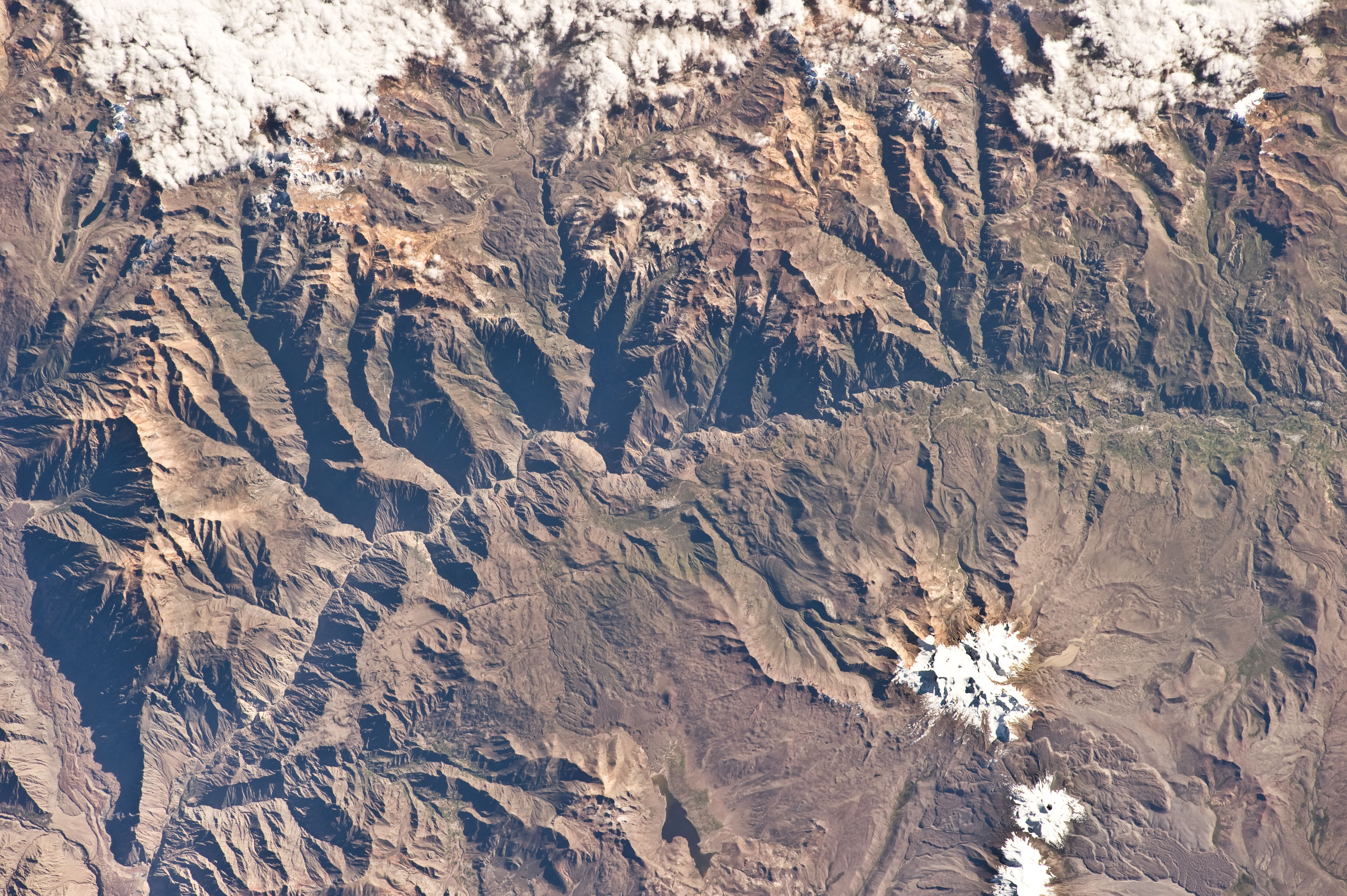
- The Colca River and Samacasa northwest of it (upper left) as seen from the ISS

Highest point
- Elevation: 5,200 m (17,100 ft)
- Coordinates: 15°25′09″S 72°06′22″W

Geography
- Location within Peru
- Location: Peru, Arequipa Region
- Parent range: Andes, Chila

Samacasa (possibly from Aymara sama color, Quechua sama rest, break, q'asa mountain pass) is a mountain in the Chila mountain range in the Andes of Peru, about 5,200 m (17,100 ft) high. It is located in the Arequipa Region, Castilla Province, Chachas District. Samacasa lies north of Airicoto.
