= Solimana =

Solimana may refer to:

- Solimana (state), a former country in West Africa
- Solimana (volcano), an extinct volcano in Peru
- Solimana (Castilla), a mountain in Peru
