= Yuaytacondorsenja =

Mountain in Peru

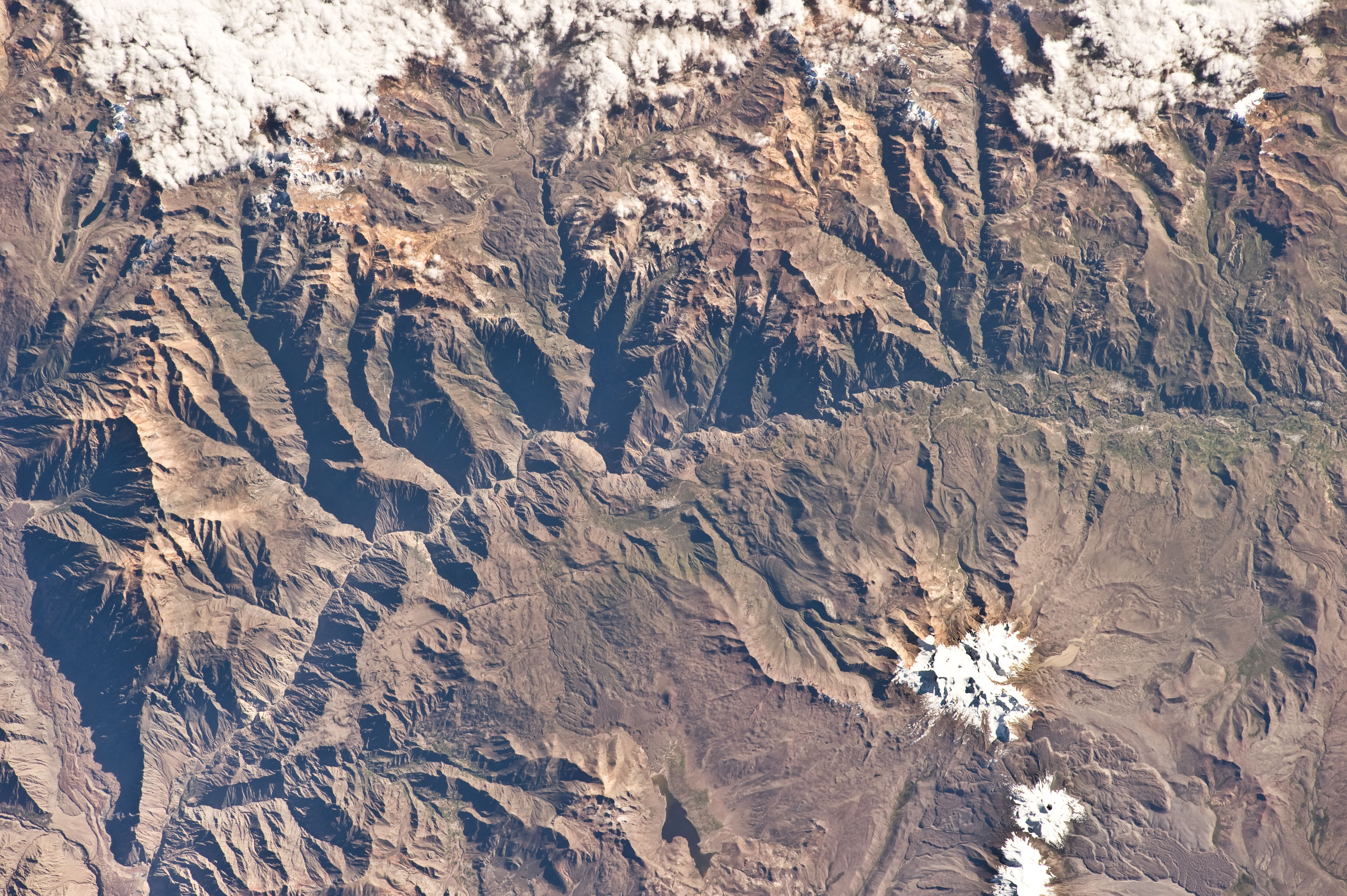
- The Colca River and Yuaytacondorsenja northwest of it (upper left edge of this image) as seen from the ISS

Highest point
- Elevation: 5,345 m (17,536 ft)
- Coordinates: 15°22′13″S 72°11′38″W

Geography
- Location within Peru
- Location: Peru, Arequipa Region
- Parent range: Andes, Chila

Yuaytacondorsenja (possibly from Quechua wayta crest; wild flower; the whistling of the wind, kuntur condor, sinqa nose,) is a 5,345-metre-high (17,536 ft) mountain in the Chila mountain range in the Andes of Peru . It is located in the Arequipa Region, Castilla Province, Chachas District. Yuaytacondorsenja lies northwest of Chila and Chila Pillune. It is situated at the end of a valley named Puncuhuaico (possibly from Quechua for p'unqu pond, dam, wayq'u valley or stream). Its stream flows to Chachas Lake.
