= Yanajaja (disambiguation) =

Yanajaja (possibly from Quechua yana black, qaqa rock, "black rock") may refer to:

- Yanajaja, a mountain in Cusco Region, Peru
- Yanajaja (Arequipa), a mountain in Arequipa Region, Peru
