= Huamanripayoc (Arequipa) =

Mountain in Peru

- Location within Peru

Highest point
- Elevation: 5,000 m (16,000 ft)
- Coordinates: 15°20′16″S 72°09′03″W

Naming
- Language of name: Quechua

Geography
- Location: Peru, Arequipa Region
- Parent range: Andes, Chila

Huamanripayoc (possibly from Quechua wamanripa Senecio, -yuq a suffix, "the one with the wamanripa") is a mountain in the Chila mountain range in the Andes of Peru, about 5,000 m (16,000 ft) high. It is located in the Arequipa Region, Castilla Province, Chachas District. Huamanripayoc lies at the Cacamayo (possibly from Quechua for "rock river"), northwest of Ticlla and northeast of Huayllayoc.
