= Ticlla (Castilla) =

Mountain in Peru

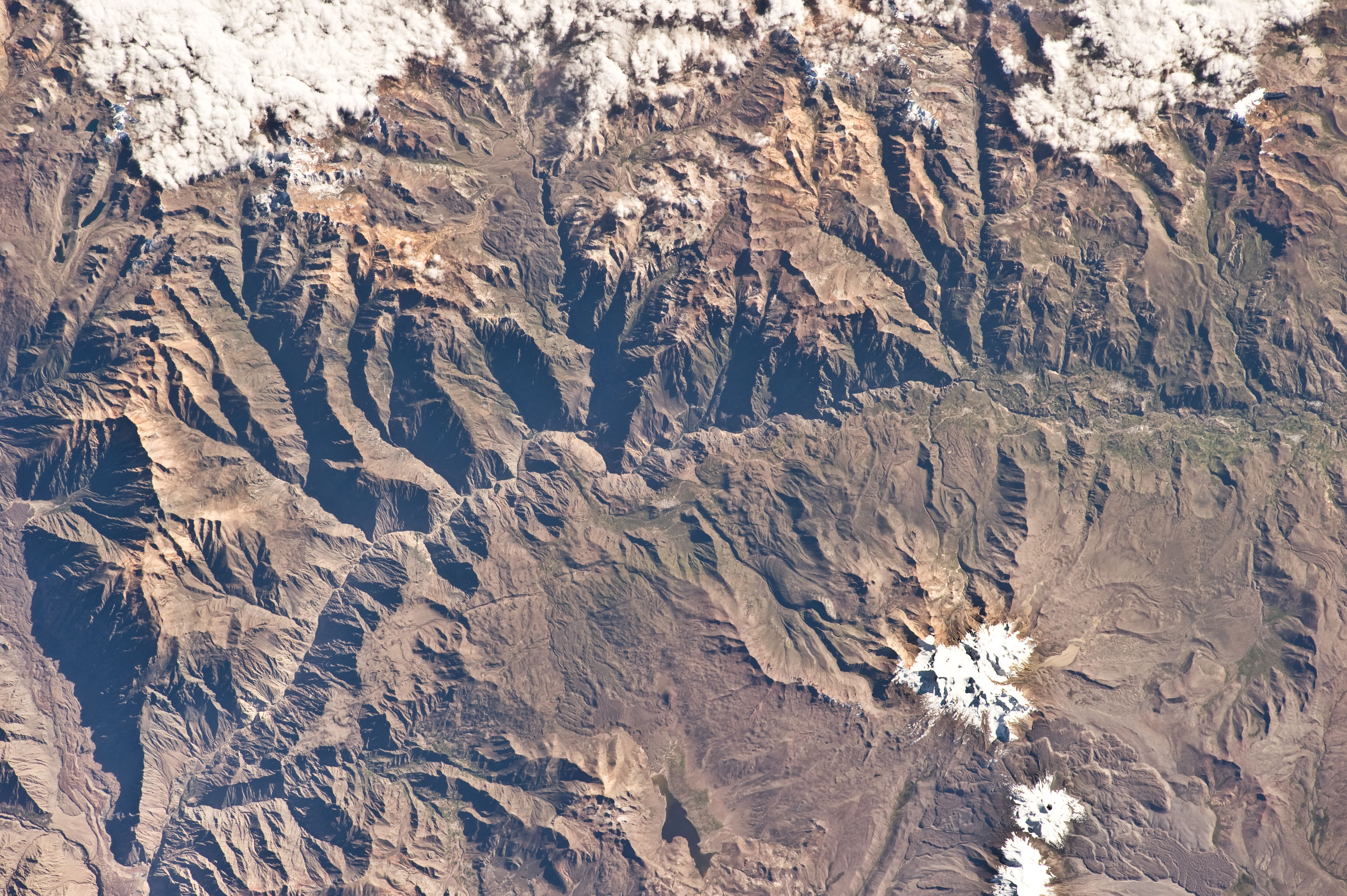
- The Colca River and Ticlla northwest of it (upper left rim of this image) as seen from the ISS

Highest point
- Elevation: 5,303 m (17,398 ft)
- Coordinates: 15°24′44″S 72°12′32″W

Naming
- Language of name: Quechua

Geography
- Location within Peru
- Location: Peru, Arequipa Region
- Parent range: Andes, Chila

Ticlla (possibly from Quechua for eyelash; two-colored, or for 'with alternating colors') is a 5,303-metre-high (17,398 ft) mountain in the Chila mountain range in the Andes of Peru. It is located in the Arequipa Region, Castilla Province, Chachas District. Ticlla lies southwest of Chila and Chila Pillune at a valley named Puncuhuaico (possibly from Quechua for p'unqu pond, dam, wayq'u valley or stream). Its intermittent stream flows to Chachas Lake.
