= Condorcacha =

Mountain in Peru

- Location within Peru

Highest point
- Elevation: 5,200 m (17,100 ft)
- Coordinates: 15°15′39″S 72°10′14″W

Naming
- Language of name: Quechua

Geography
- Location: Peru, Arequipa Region
- Parent range: Andes, Chila

Condorcacha (possibly from Quechua kuntur condor, khacha crusted dirt, "crusted condor dirt") is a mountain in the Chila mountain range in the Andes of Peru, about 5,200 metres (17,060 ft) high. It is located in the Arequipa Region, Castilla Province, Chachas District. Condorcacha lies in a remote, mountainous area east of Orcopampa. It is situated southeast of Huayllatarpuna.
