= ICMA =

ICMA may refer to:

- Chartered Institute of Management Accountants, formerly the Institute of Cost and Management Accountants
- International Capital Market Association, a not-for-profit global trade association
- International Christian Maritime Association
- International City/County Management Association
- International Classical Music Awards
- InterContinental Music Awards
- International Computer Music Association
- Isnad-cum-matn analysis
- Icma, a mountain in Peru

== See also ==
- Institute of Cost and Management Accountants of Bangladesh
- Institute of Cost and Management Accountants of Pakistan
