= Sawsi =

Mountain in Peru

- Location within Peru

Highest point
- Elevation: 4,942 m (16,214 ft)
- Coordinates: 15°01′59″S 72°06′38″W

Naming
- Language of name: Quechua

Geography
- Location: Peru, Arequipa Region
- Parent range: Andes

Sawsi (Quechua for willow or a species of willows, Hispanicized spelling Sauce) is a 4,942-metre-high (16,214 ft) mountain in the Andes of Peru. It is situated in the Arequipa Region, Castilla Province, on the border of the districts of Chachas and Orcopampa. Sawsi lies at a lake named Machuqucha.
