= Solimana (Castilla) =

Mountain in Peru

- Location within Peru

Highest point
- Elevation: 5,242 m (17,198 ft)
- Coordinates: 15°19′52″S 72°09′44″W

Geography
- Location: Peru, Arequipa Region
- Parent range: Andes, Chila

Solimana is a 5,242-metre-high (17,198 ft) mountain in the Chila mountain range in the Andes of Peru. It is located in the Arequipa Region, Castilla Province, Chachas District. Solimana lies northwest of Huamanripayoc and north of Huayllayoc.
