= Yanajaja (Arequipa) =

Mountain in Peru

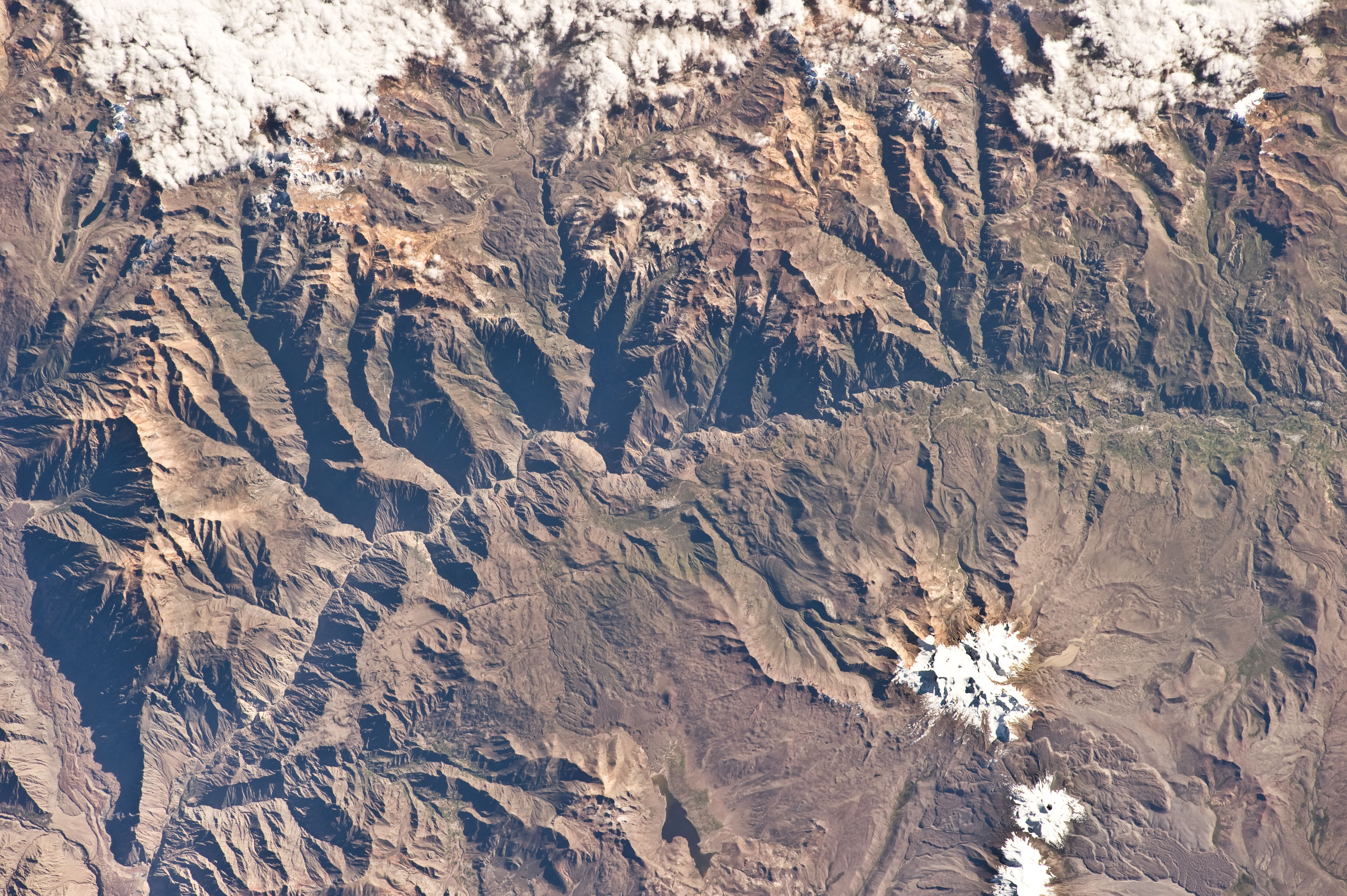
- The Colca River and Yanajaja northwest of it (upper left) as seen from the ISS

Highest point
- Elevation: 5,173 m (16,972 ft)
- Coordinates: 15°27′55″S 72°11′40″W

Naming
- Language of name: Quechua

Geography
- Location within Peru
- Location: Peru, Arequipa Region
- Parent range: Andes, Chila

Yanajaja (possibly from Quechua yana black, qaqa rock, "black rock") is a 5,173-metre-high (16,972 ft) mountain in the west of the Chila mountain range in the Andes of Peru. It is located in the Arequipa Region, Castilla Province, Chachas District. Yanajaja lies southwest of Cerani at a lake named Cochapunco.
