= Viraco District =

Coordinates: 15.6683°S 72.5315°W

Viraco
- District
- Interactive map of Viraco
- Country: Peru
- Region: Arequipa
- Province: Castilla
- Capital: Viraco

Government
  - Mayor: Nazario Zenon Yaulli Neira

Area
  - Total: 141 km^{2} (54 sq mi)
- Elevation: 3,215 m (10,548 ft)

Population (2005 census)
  - Total: 1,956
  - Density: 13.9/km^{2} (35.9/sq mi)
- Time zone: UTC-5 (PET)
- UBIGEO: 040414

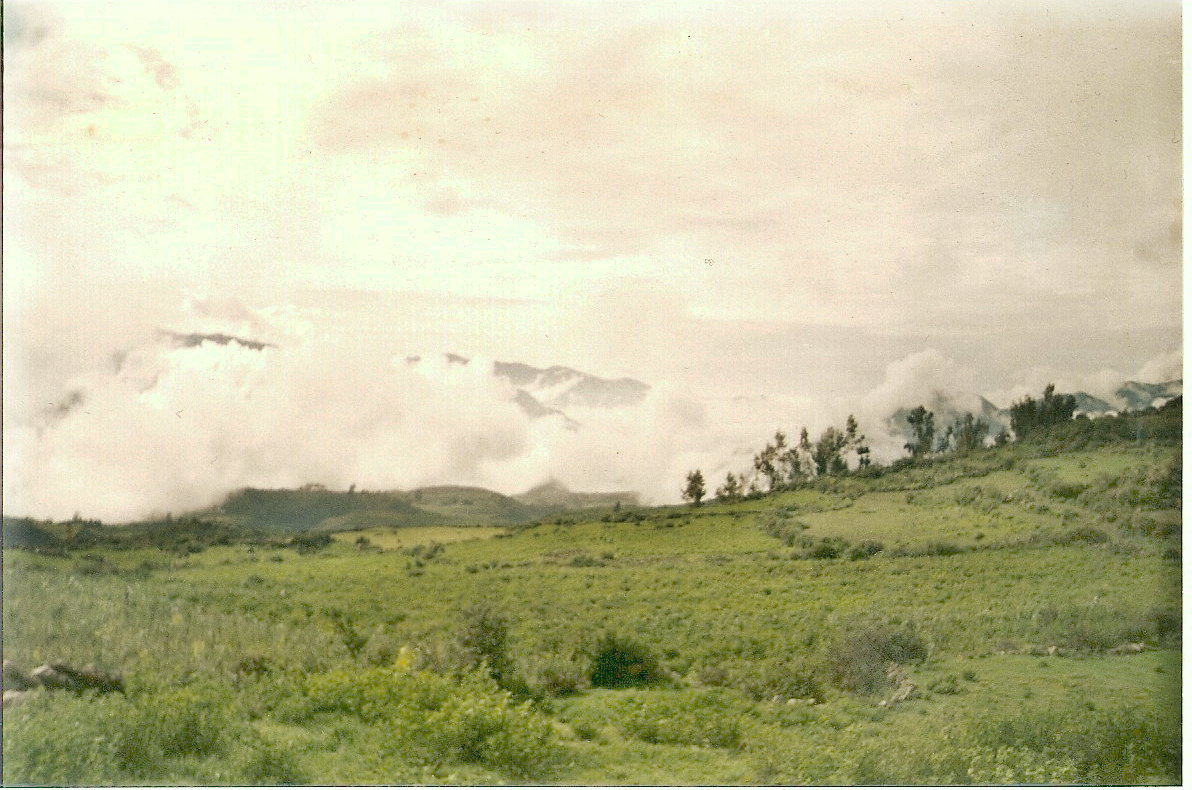
Hills in Viraco District.

Viraco District is one of fourteen districts of the province Castilla in Peru.
