= Qullpa (Castilla) =

Mountain in Peru

- Location within Peru

Highest point
- Elevation: 5,226.4 m (17,147 ft)
- Coordinates: 15°43′28″S 72°21′38″W

Geography
- Location: Peru, Arequipa Region, Castilla Province
- Parent range: Andes

Qullpa (Aymara and Quechua for saltpeter, Hispanicized spelling Jollpa) is a mountain in the Andes of Peru, about 5,226.4 metres (17,147 ft) high. It is situated in the Arequipa Region, Castilla Province, on the border of the districts Ayo and Uñón. Qullpa lies south of the mountain Yanqha.

== See also ==
- Yanawara
