= Quiscapampa =

Mountain in Peru

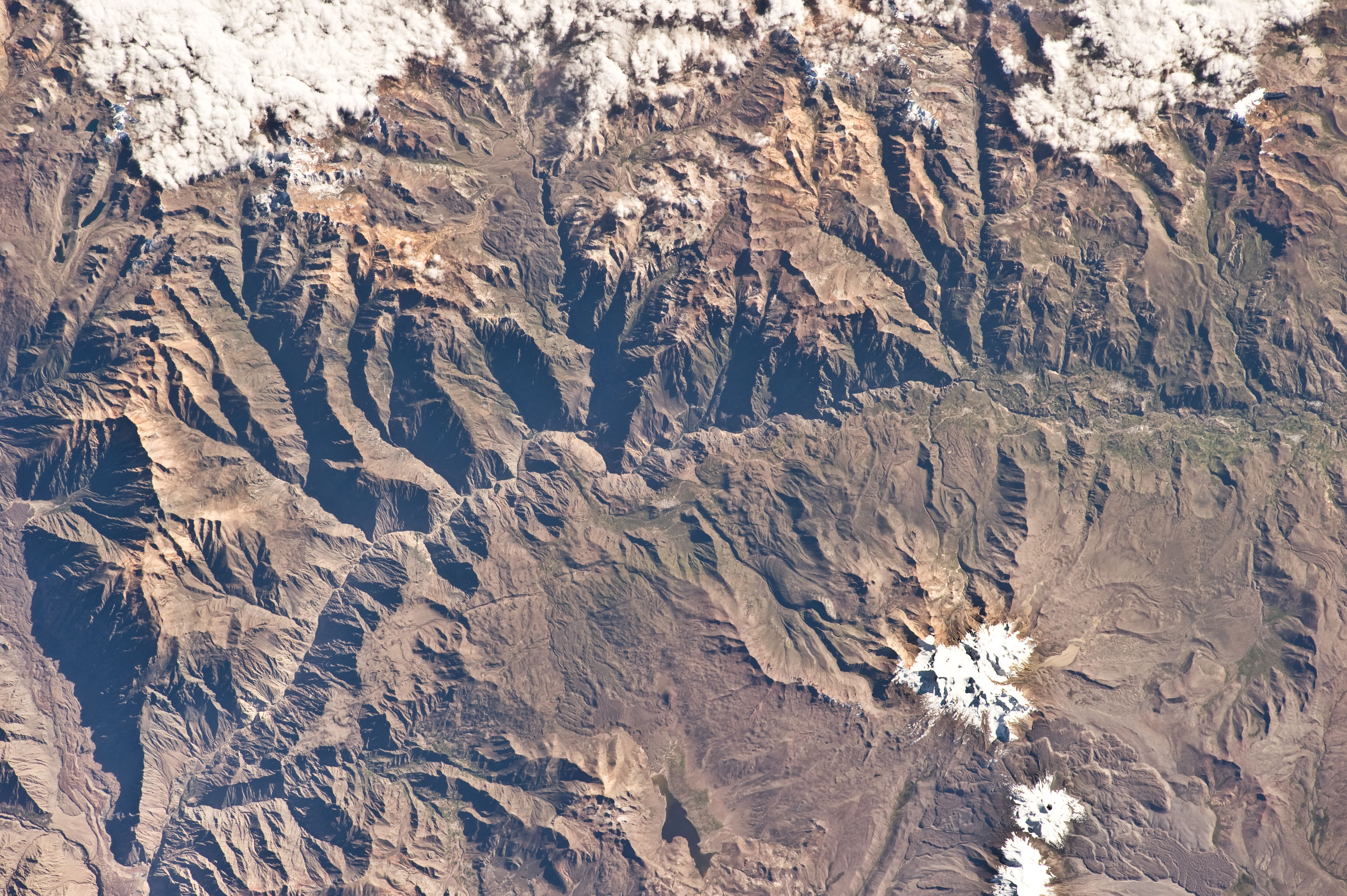
- The Colca River and Quiscapampa north of it (upper left) as seen from the ISS

Highest point
- Elevation: 5,400 m (17,700 ft)
- Coordinates: 15°27′48″S 72°06′29″W

Geography
- Location within Peru
- Location: Peru, Arequipa Region, Castilla Province
- Parent range: Andes, Chila

Quiscapampa or Quiscapanca (possibly from Quechua kiska thorn, p'anqa bract, "thorn bract") is a mountain in the Chila mountain in the Andes of Peru, about 5,400 m (17,717 ft) high. It is located in the Arequipa Region, Castilla Province, Choco District. Quiscapampa lies northwest of Ojeccasa and southwest of Airicoto.

Jesjapanca is also the name of the peak southeast of the mountain at 15°29′59″S 72°03′53″W. It is about 5,000 m (16,404 ft) high.
