= Waqrawiri =

Mountain in Peru

- Location within Peru

Highest point
- Elevation: 5,425 m (17,799 ft)
- Coordinates: 14°58′35″S 72°12′16″W

Geography
- Location: Peru, Arequipa Region, Castilla Province
- Parent range: Andes, Wansu

Waqrawiri (Quechua waqra horn, wiri lasso, "horn lasso", Hispanicized spelling Huajrahuire) or Waxra Wiri (Aymara waxra horn, wiri (a part of) a foot plough) is a mountain in the Wansu mountain range in the Andes of Peru, about 5,425 metres (17,799 ft) high. It is situated in the Arequipa Region, Castilla Province, Orcopampa District. Waqrawiri lies northwest of the lake Machuqucha and south of the river Millumayu (Quechua for aluminium sulfate river, Hispanicized Millomayo).
