= Ccella Ccella =

Mountain in Peru

- Location within Peru

Highest point
- Elevation: 5,049 m (16,565 ft)
- Coordinates: 15°14′55″S 71°56′42″W

Geography
- Location: Peru, Arequipa Region, Castilla Province, Caylloma Province
- Parent range: Andes, Chila

Ccella Ccella (possibly from Quechua q'illa scar, Aymara qhilla scar (in Quechua qhilla or qilla means "lazybones"), the reduplication indicates that there is a group or a complex of something, "a complex of scars") is a mountain in the Chila in the Andes of Peru, about 5,049 metres (16,565 ft) high. It is situated in the Arequipa Region, Castilla Province, Choco District, and in the Caylloma Province, on the border of the districts of Caylloma and Tapay.
