= Choco District =

Coordinates: 15.5761°S 72.1331°W

Choco
- District
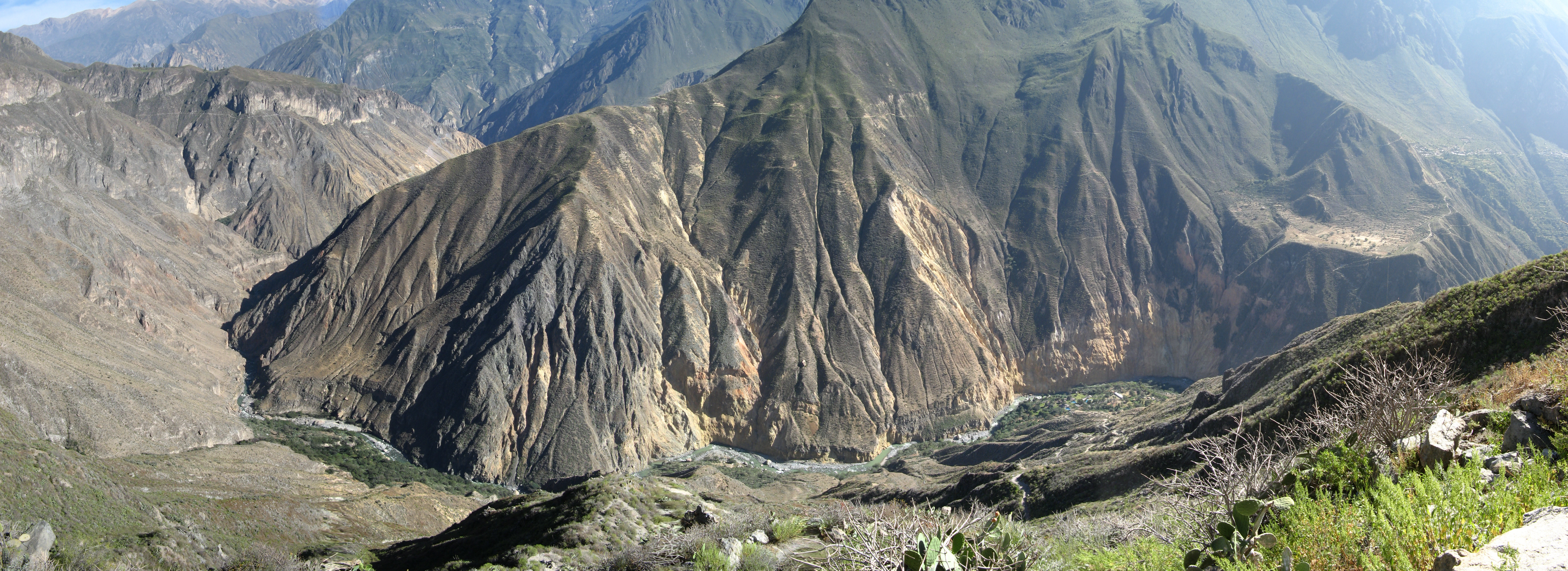
- Apachita mountain and Qullqa River on the border of the districts of Choco (on the left) and Tapay
- Interactive map of Choco
- Country: Peru
- Region: Arequipa
- Province: Castilla
- Founded: January 2, 1857
- Capital: Choco

Government
  - Mayor: Trifonio Lucas Aragon Lupaca

Area
  - Total: 904.33 km^{2} (349.16 sq mi)
- Elevation: 2,473 m (8,114 ft)

Population (2005 census)
  - Total: 1,235
  - Density: 1.366/km^{2} (3.537/sq mi)
- Time zone: UTC-5 (PET)
- UBIGEO: 040406

Choco District is one of fourteen districts of the province Castilla in Peru.

== Geography ==
The Chila mountain range traverses the district. One of the highest mountains of the district is Chila at 5,654 m (18,550 ft) above sea level. Other mountains are listed below:

- Anta Qullu
- Anta Willkaña
- Apachita
- Ayri Qutu
- Chuqu Chuqu
- Chuqi Pirwa
- Chuqiwa
- Chila
- Janq'u Quta
- Kampanayuq
- Kiska P'anqa
- Kuntur
- Kuntur K'ark'a
- Kuntur
- Mawras
- Mulluq'u Pampa
- Panti
- Phusuqu
- P'isaqa
- Qallwa
- Qiñwa
- Qura
- Q'asiri
- Q'illa Q'illa
- Sama Q'asa
- Sirani
- Sukna
- Suntur Uta
- Taypi Q'asa
- Uqi Q'asa
- Uqha Q'asa
- Urqun Ikiña
- Wallatani
- Warana
- Wat'aña
- Wamani
- Waña Qutaki
- Waraquyuq
- Waywa Wawa
- Wit'u
- Yuraq Q'asa

== Ethnic groups ==
The people in the district are mainly indigenous citizens of Quechua descent. Quechua is the language which the majority of the population (67.11%) learnt to speak in childhood, 32.23% of the residents started speaking using the Spanish language (2007 Peru Census).
