= Ojeccasa =

Mountain in Peru

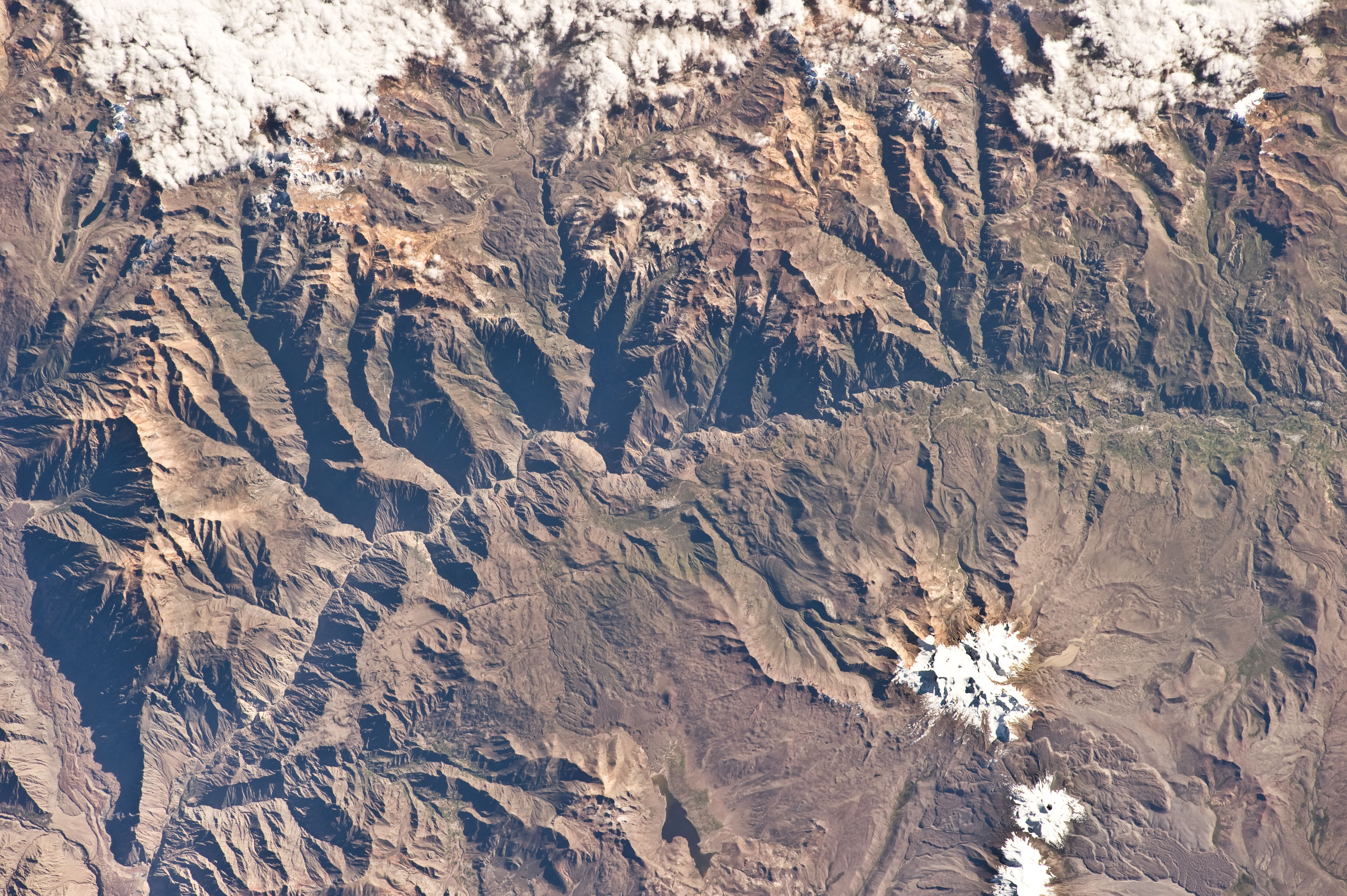
- The Colca River and Ojeccasa north of it (upper left) as seen from the ISS

Highest point
- Elevation: 5,081 m (16,670 ft)
- Coordinates: 15°29′49″S 72°06′10″W

Geography
- Location within Peru
- Location: Peru, Arequipa Region, Castilla Province
- Parent range: Andes, Chila

Ojeccasa (possibly from Quechua uqi lead, q'asa mountain pass, "lead pass") is a 5,081-metre-high (16,670 ft) mountain in the Chila mountain in the Andes of Peru. It is located in the Arequipa Region, Castilla Province, Choco District. Ojeccasa lies southeast of Quiscapampa.
