= Sukna =

Mountain in Peru

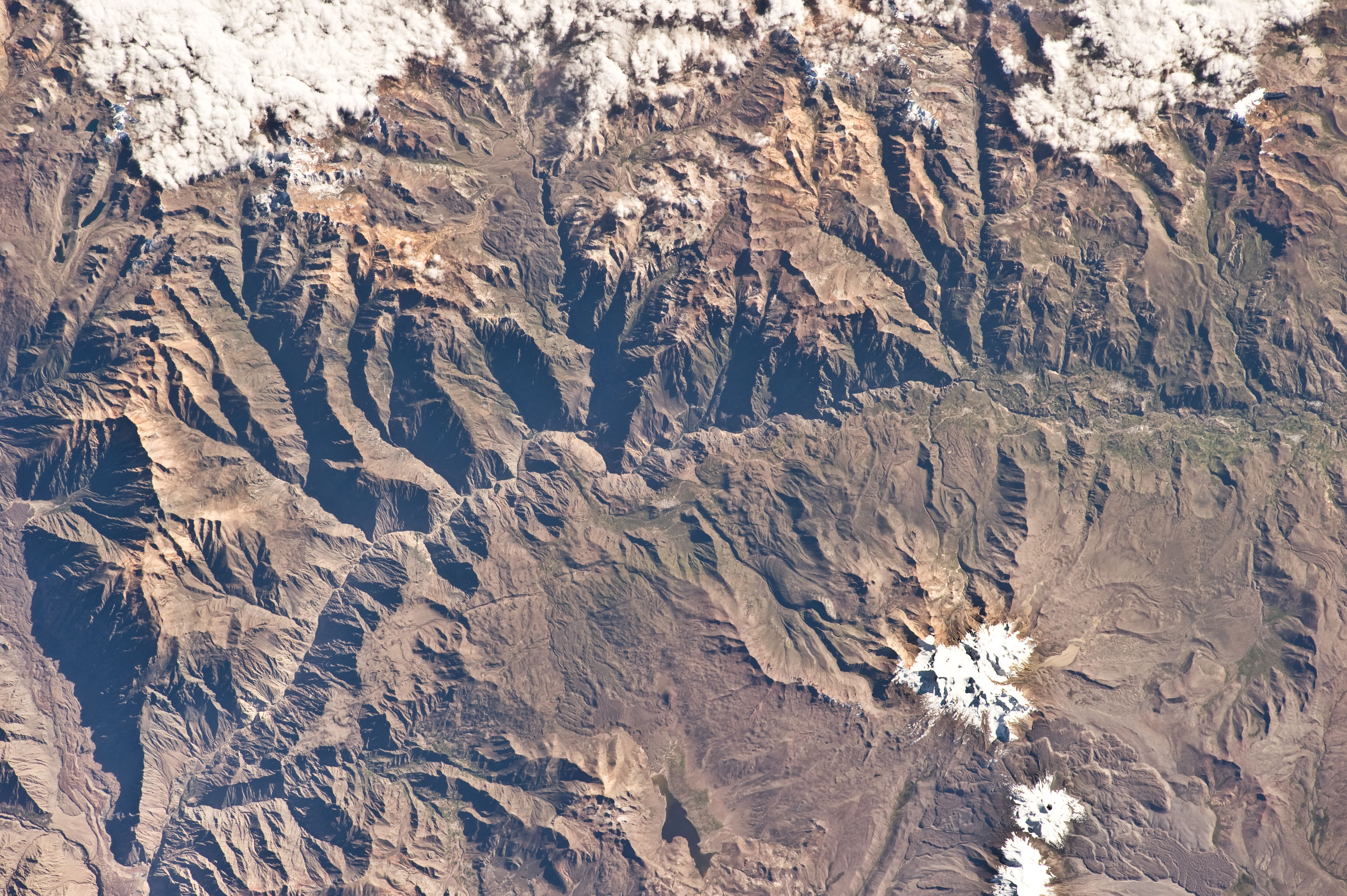
- The Colca River and Sukna west of it (on the left) as seen from the ISS

Highest point
- Elevation: 5,120 m (16,800 ft)
- Coordinates: 15°35′42″S 72°12′37″W

Naming
- Language of name: Quechua

Geography
- Location within Peru
- Location: Peru, Arequipa Region
- Parent range: Andes

Sukna (Quechua for friend, Hispanicized spelling Sucna) is a 5,120-metre-high (16,798 ft) mountain in the Andes of Peru. It is located in the Arequipa Region, Castilla Province, on the border of the districts of Ayo and Choco. Sukna lies southwest of Qallwa.
