= Casiri (Arequipa) =

Mountain in Peru

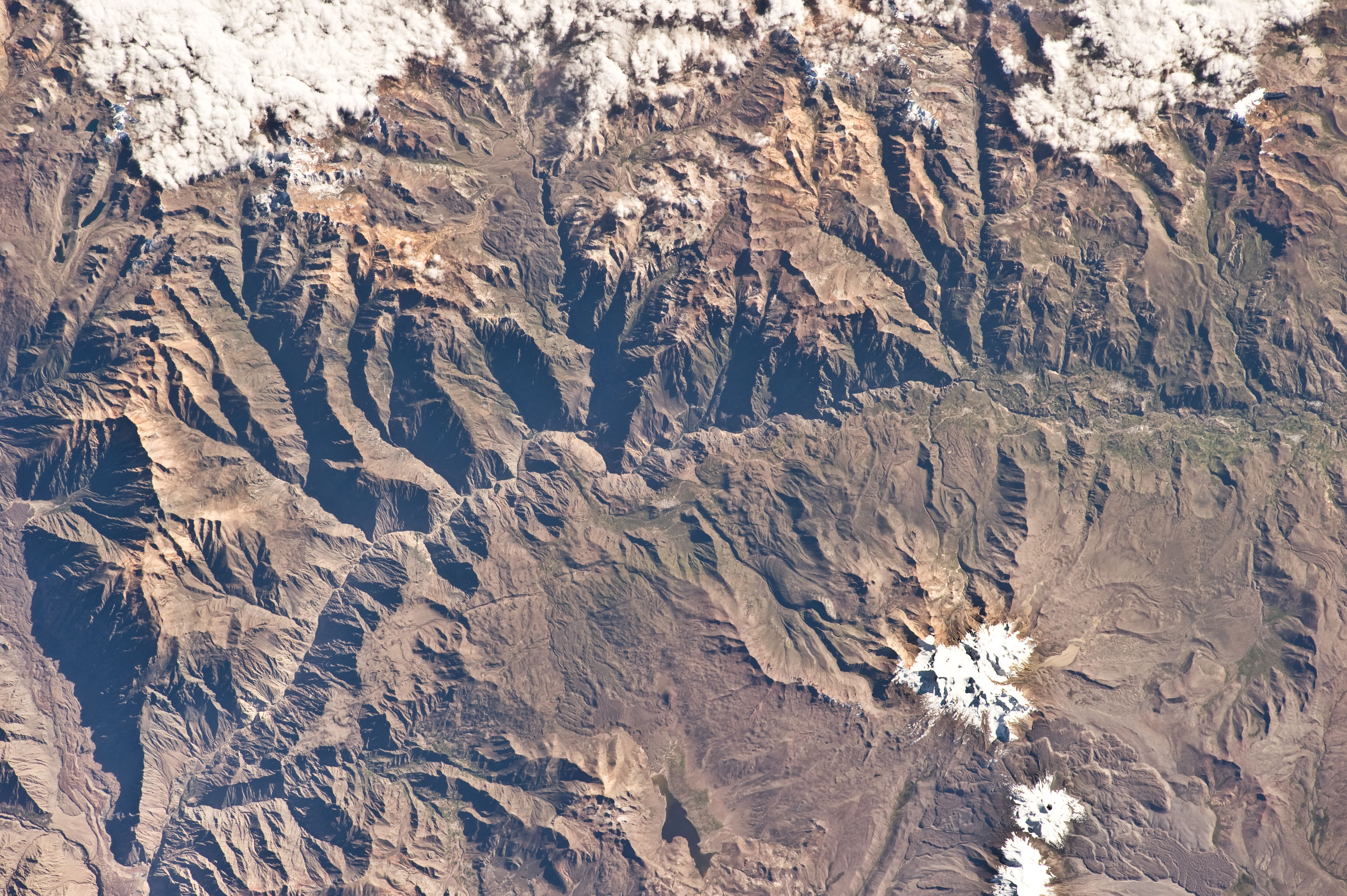
- The Colca River and Casiri north of it (upper left) as seen from the ISS

Highest point
- Elevation: 5,647 m (18,527 ft)
- Coordinates: 15°27′46″S 72°10′17″W

Geography
- Location within Peru
- Location: Peru, Arequipa Region
- Parent range: Andes, Chila

Casiri (possibly from Aymara for "bawler") is a mountain in the Andes of Peru, about 5,647 metres (18,527 ft) high. It is located in the Arequipa Region, Castilla Province, on the border of the districts of Chachas and Choco. Casiri lies in the western part of the Chila mountain range in the Arequipa Region, south of Chila, Choquepirhua and Yuraccacsa, and northeast of Cerani.
