= Tipán District =

Tipán
- District
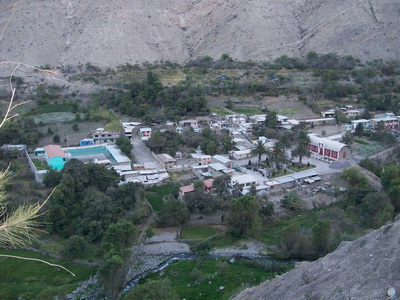
- The village of Tipán and river Antamayu

- Location within Arequipa Department
- Coordinates: 15°44′50″S 72°29′50″W
- Country: Peru
- Region: Arequipa
- Province: Castilla
- Founded: December 13, 1943
- Capital: Tipán

Government
  - Mayor: Hugo Galo Reymer Fernandez

Area
  - Total: 57.68 km^{2} (22.27 sq mi)
- Elevation: 1,913 m (6,276 ft)

Population (2005 census)
  - Total: 589
  - Density: 10.2/km^{2} (26.4/sq mi)
- Time zone: UTC-5 (PET)
- UBIGEO: 040411

Tipán District is one of fourteen districts of the province Castilla in Peru.

== See also ==
- Antamayu
