= Ayo District =

Coordinates: 15.6830°S 72.2738°W

Ayo Ayu
- District
- Interactive map of Ayo
- Country: Peru
- Region: Arequipa
- Province: Castilla
- Founded: April 3, 1928
- Capital: Ayo

Government
  - Mayor: Victor Luis Mejia Mejia

Area
  - Total: 327.97 km^{2} (126.63 sq mi)
- Elevation: 1,956 m (6,417 ft)

Population (2005 census)
  - Total: 392
  - Density: 1.20/km^{2} (3.10/sq mi)
- Time zone: UTC-5 (PET)
- UBIGEO: 040403

Ayo District is one of fourteen districts of the province Castilla in Peru.

== See also ==
- Qallwa
- Qullpa
- Sukna
- Yanawara
- Yanqha
