= Posoco =

Mountain in Peru

- Location within Peru

Highest point
- Elevation: 5,000 m (16,000 ft)
- Coordinates: 15°18′23″S 72°07′28″W

Naming
- Language of name: Quechua

Geography
- Location: Peru, Arequipa Region
- Parent range: Andes, Chila

Posoco (possibly from Quechua for foam) is a mountain in the Chila mountain range in the Andes of Peru, about 5,000 m (16,404 ft) high. It is situated in the Arequipa Region, Castilla Province, on the border of the districts of Chachas and Choco.

Posoco is also the name of an intermittent stream which originates at the mountain. It flows to Collpamayo (possibly from Quechua for "salty river") in the southeast. Collpamayo is a tributary of Molloco River which is a right affluent of Colca River.
