= Airicoto =

Mountain in Peru

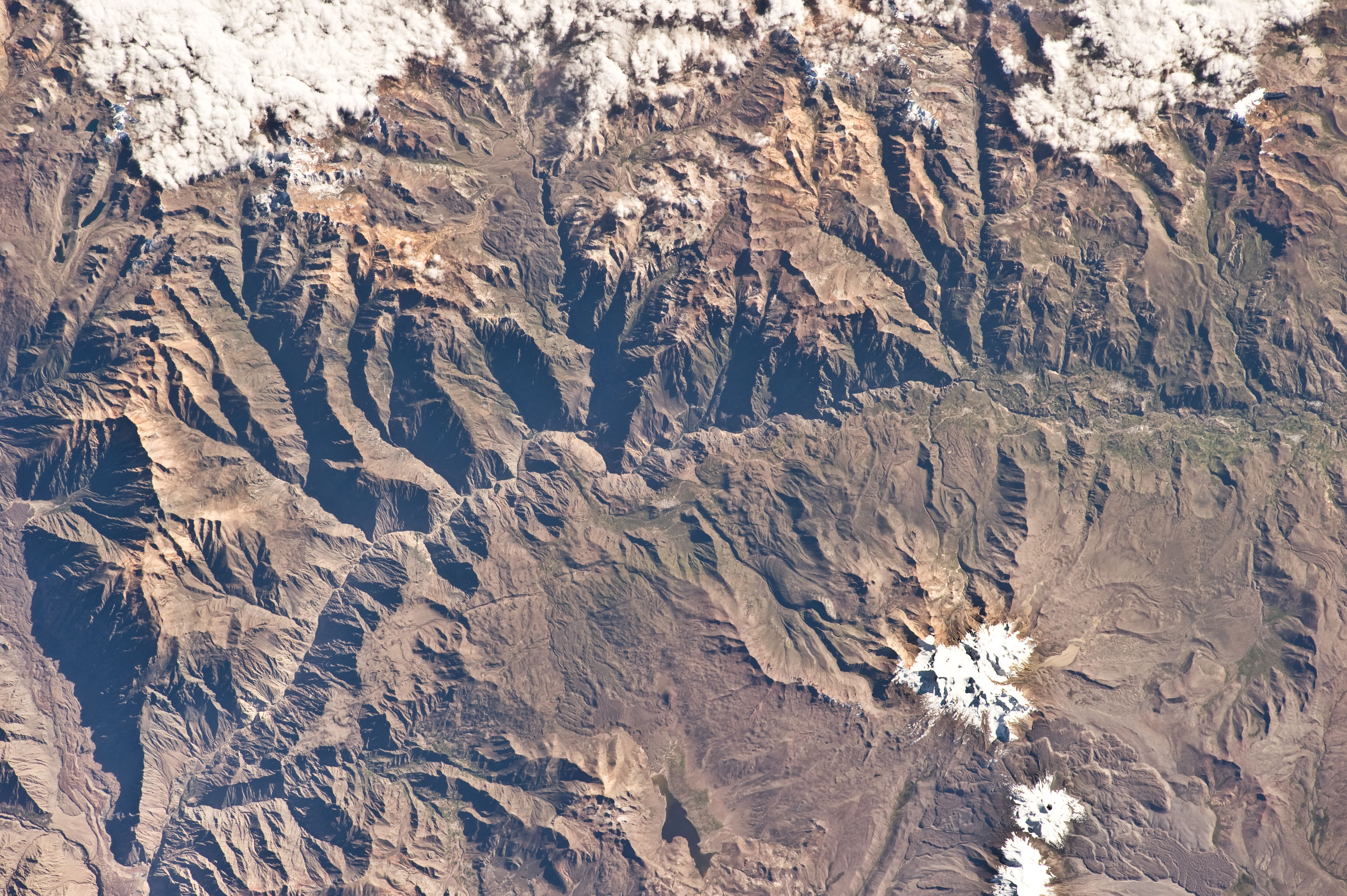
- The Colca River and Airicoto north of it (upper left) as seen from the ISS

Highest point
- Elevation: 5,400 m (17,700 ft)
- Coordinates: 15°26′56″S 72°06′11″W

Geography
- Location within Peru
- Location: Peru, Arequipa Region, Castilla Province
- Parent range: Andes, Chila

Airicoto (possibly from Quechua ayri axe, qutu heap, "axe heap") is a mountain in the Chila mountain in the Andes of Peru, about 5,400 m (17,700 ft) high. It is located in the Arequipa Region, Castilla Province, Choco District. It lies northeast of Quiscapampa and east of Yuraccacsa.

Airicoto is also the name of the valley west of the mountain. Its waters flow to Colca River in the south.
