= Puca Mauras =

Mountain in Peru

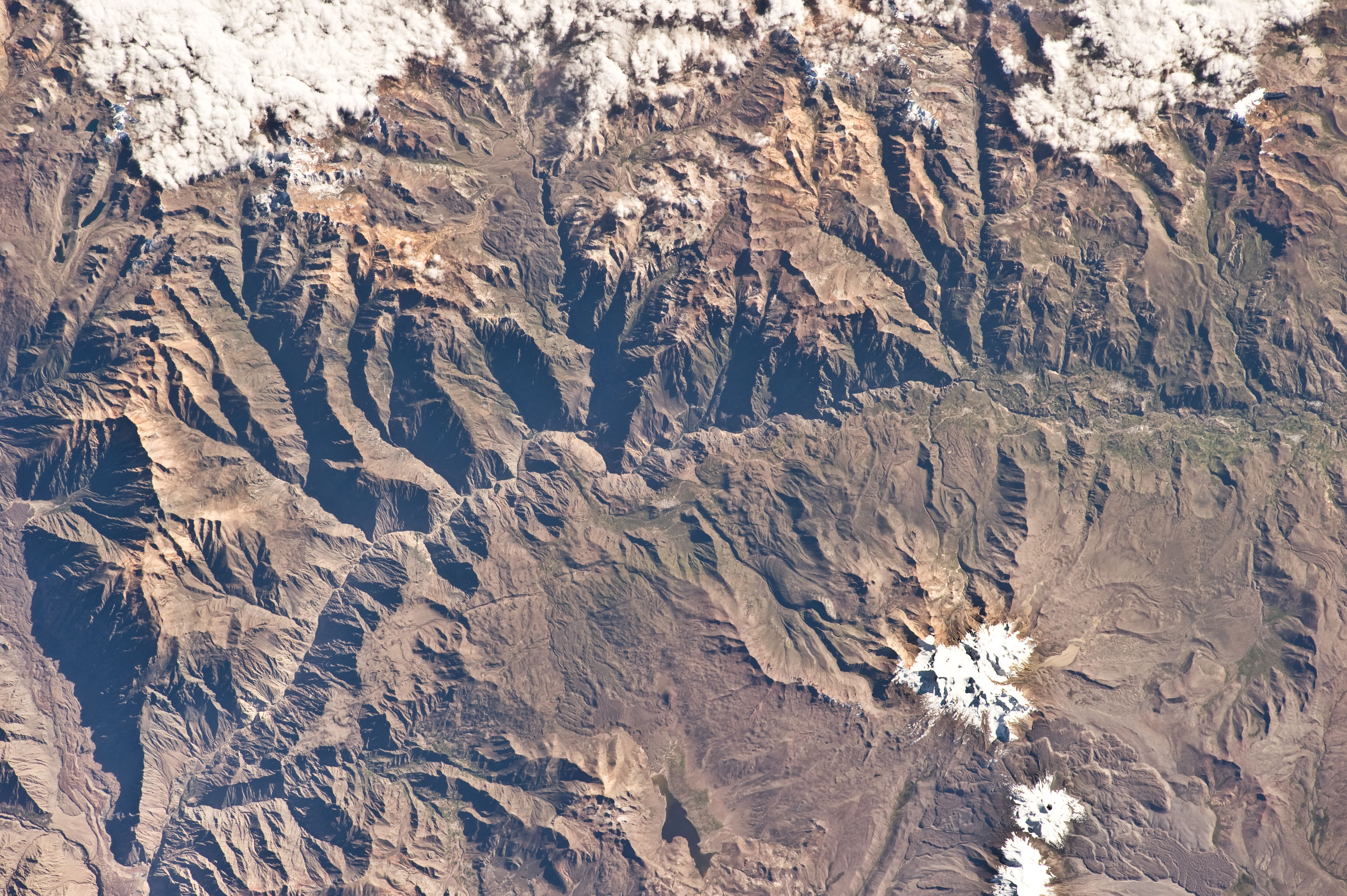
- The Colca River and Puca Mauras northwest of it (at the left rim of this image) as seen from the ISS

Highest point
- Elevation: 4,955 m (16,257 ft)
- Coordinates: 15°27′13″S 72°13′49″W

Geography
- Location within Peru
- Location: Peru, Arequipa Region, Castilla Province, Chachas District
- Parent range: Andes, Chila

Puca Mauras (possibly from Quechua puka red) is a 4,955-metre-high (16,257 ft) volcano in the Andes of Peru. It is situated in the Arequipa Region, Castilla Province, Chachas District. Puca Mauras lies in the western extensions of the Chila mountain range, west of a lake named Cochapunco (possibly from in the Quechua spelling Qucha P'unqu).
