= Icma =

Mountain in Peru

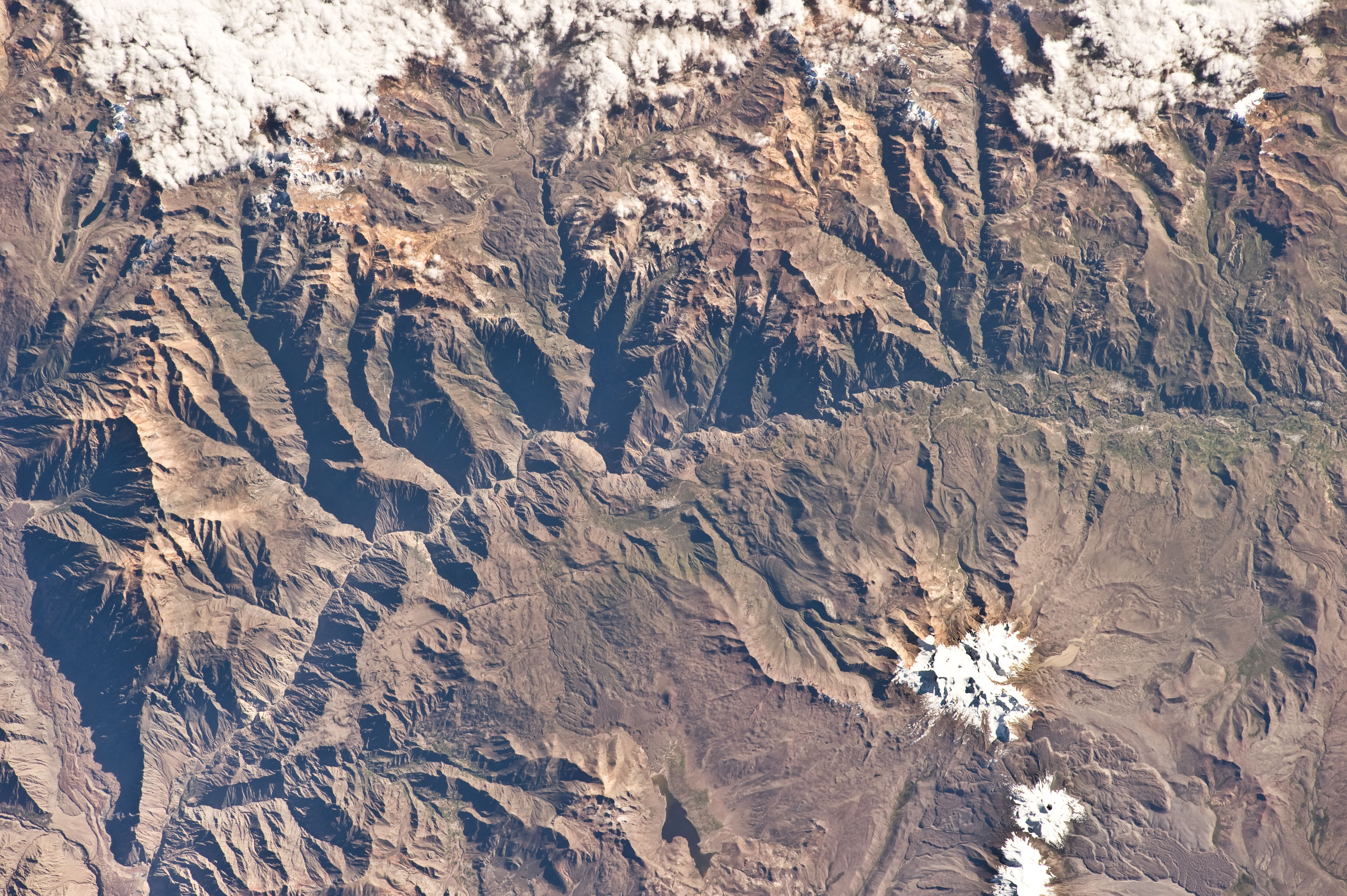
- The Colca River and Icma northwest of it (upper left) as seen from the ISS

Highest point
- Elevation: 4,800 m (15,700 ft)
- Coordinates: 15°28′39″S 72°12′24″W

Naming
- Language of name: Quechua

Geography
- Location within Peru
- Location: Peru, Arequipa Region
- Parent range: Andes, Chila

Icma (possibly from Quechua for widow) is a mountain in the west of the Chila mountain range in the Andes of Peru, about 4,800 m (15,700 ft) high. It is located in the Arequipa Region, Castilla Province, Chachas District. Icma lies southwest of Casiri at a lake named Cochapunco.
