= Aplao District =

Coordinates: 16.0713°S 72.4882°W

Aplao
- District
- Interactive map of Aplao
- Country: Peru
- Region: Arequipa
- Province: Castilla
- Capital: Aplao

Government
  - Mayor: Gilder Edy Medina Collado

Area
  - Total: 640.04 km^{2} (247.12 sq mi)
- Elevation: 617 m (2,024 ft)

Population (2005 census)
  - Total: 9,015
  - Density: 14.09/km^{2} (36.48/sq mi)
- Time zone: UTC-5 (PET)
- UBIGEO: 040401

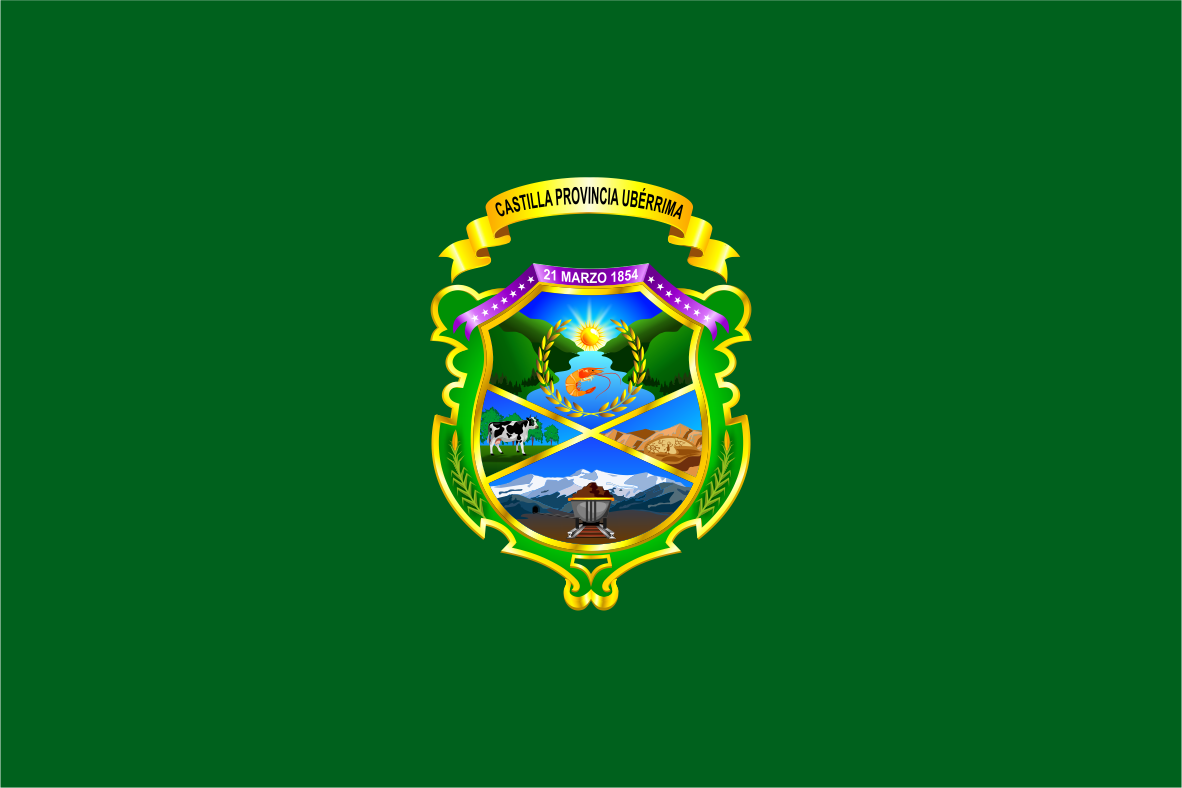
Aplao District - Province of Castilla - Arequipa Region

Aplao District is one of fourteen districts of the Castilla Province in Peru.

== See also ==
- Antamayu
