= Uraca District =

Coordinates: 16.2235°S 72.4666°W

Uraca Uraka
- District
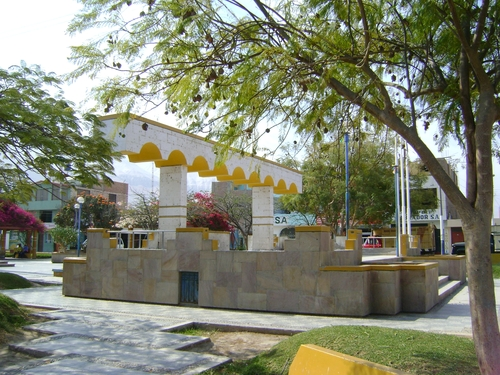
- Interactive map of Uraca
- Country: Peru
- Region: Arequipa
- Province: Castilla
- Capital: Corire

Government
  - Mayor: Hector Raul Caceres Muñoz

Area
  - Total: 713.83 km^{2} (275.61 sq mi)
- Elevation: 429 m (1,407 ft)

Population (2005 census)
  - Total: 6,553
  - Density: 9.180/km^{2} (23.78/sq mi)
- Time zone: UTC-5 (PET)
- UBIGEO: 040413

Uraca District is one of fourteen districts of the province Castilla in Peru.
