= Yanqha =

Mountain in Peru

- Location within Peru

Highest point
- Elevation: 5,200 m (17,100 ft)
- Coordinates: 15°40′46″S 72°22′24″W

Geography
- Location: Peru, Arequipa Region, Castilla Province
- Parent range: Andes

Yanqha (Aymara for bad, Quechua yanqha, yanqa, useless, trivial, unimportant, Hispanicized spelling Yancca) is a mountain in the Andes of Peru, about 5,200 metres (17,060 ft) high. It is situated in the Arequipa Region, Castilla Province, on the border of the districts Ayo and Uñón. Yanqha lies south of the mountains Yanawara and Yana Urqu (Quechua for "black mountain", Hispanicized Yana Orcco) and north of the mountain Qullpa.
