= Andamayo River =

Coordinates: 15°50′51″S 72°26′36″W

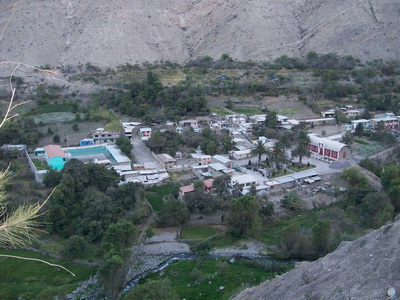
- The river Andamayo as it flows along the village Tipan
- Etymology: Quechua

Location
- Country: Peru
- Region: Arequipa Region

Physical characteristics
- Mouth: Inambari River

Andamayo River (possibly from Quechua anta copper, mayu river, "copper river") or Capiza is a river in Peru located in the Arequipa Region, Castilla Province, in the districts Aplao and Tipan. Its direction is mainly to the south where it meets Colca River as a right affluent. The confluence is north of the village Andamayo.
