= Uñón District =

Uñón Uñun
- District
- Interactive map of Uñón
- Country: Peru
- Region: Arequipa
- Province: Castilla
- Founded: June 18, 1962
- Capital: Uñón

Government
  - Mayor: Elard Percy Amesquita Silva

Area
  - Total: 296.93 km^{2} (114.65 sq mi)
- Elevation: 2,782 m (9,127 ft)

Population (2005 census)
  - Total: 233
  - Density: 0.785/km^{2} (2.03/sq mi)
- Time zone: UTC-5 (PET)
- UBIGEO: 040412

Uñón District is one of fourteen districts of the province Castilla in Peru.

== See also ==
- Qullpa
- Yanqha
