= Choquepirhua (Arequipa) =

Mountain in Peru

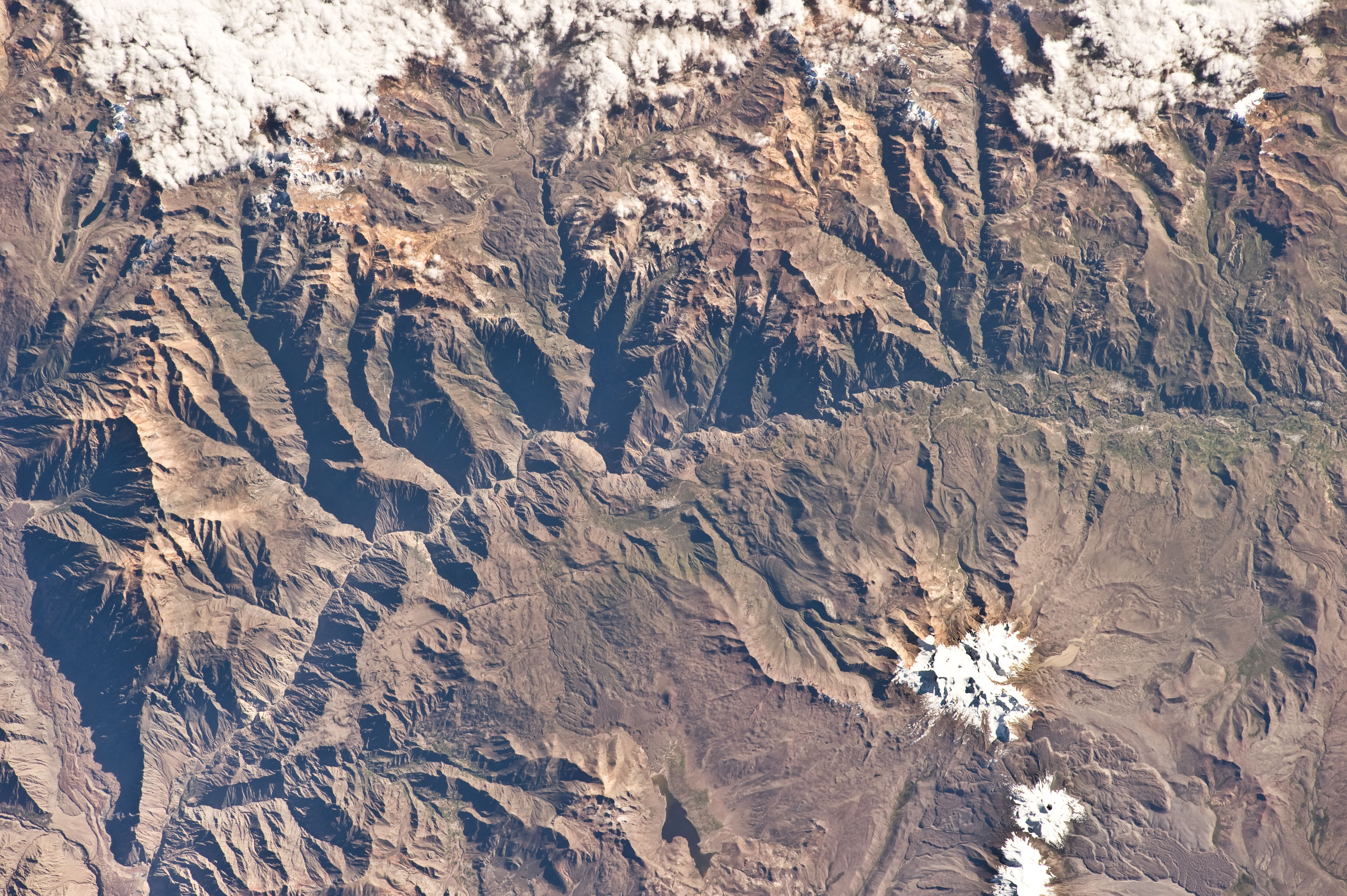
- The Colca River and Choquepirhua north of it (upper left) as seen from the ISS

Highest point
- Elevation: 5,400 m (17,700 ft)
- Coordinates: 15°25′23″S 72°10′5″W

Geography
- Location within Peru
- Location: Peru, Arequipa Region, Castilla Province
- Parent range: Andes, Chila

Choquepirhua (possibly from Aymara chuqi gold, pirwa, piwra granary, Quechua chuqi, metal, every kind of precious metal; gold (<Aymara), pirwa deposit, "gold granary" or "metal deposit") is a mountain in the Chila mountain range in the Andes of Peru, about 5,400 metres (17,717 ft) high. It lies in the Arequipa Region, Castilla Province, on the border of the districts of Chachas and Choco. Choquepirhua is situated south of Chila.

== See also ==
- Casiri
- Cerani
- Yuraccacsa
