= Pillune (Castilla) =

Mountain in Peru

- Location within Peru

Highest point
- Elevation: 5,000 m (16,000 ft)
- Coordinates: 15°4′32″S 72°4′29″W

Naming
- Language of name: Aymara

Geography
- Location: Peru, Arequipa Region
- Parent range: Andes, Chila

Pillune (possibly from Aymara pillu crown or cord which some indigenous peoples use to tighten their hair, -ni a suffix to indicate ownership, "the one with a crown" or "the one with a pillu") is a mountain in the Chila mountain range in the Andes of Peru, about 5,000 m (16,000 ft) high. It is situated in the Arequipa Region, Castilla Province, Chachas District. Pillune lies southeast of a lake named Machucocha.
