= Chinchón (mountain) =

Mountain in Peru

- Location within Peru

Highest point
- Elevation: 5,400 m (17,700 ft)
- Coordinates: 15°19′49″S 72°12′31″W

Geography
- Location: Peru, Arequipa Region, Castilla Province
- Parent range: Andes, Chila

Chinchón (possibly from Quechua chinchu a plant of the Tagetes family, -n a suffix) is a mountain in the western part of the Chila mountain range in the Andes of Peru, about 5,400 metres (17,717 ft) high. It lies in the Arequipa Region, Castilla Province, Chachas District. Chinchón is situated southwest of Huayta and southeast of Aceruta.
