= Huayllatarpuna (mountain) =

Mountain in Peru

- Location within Peru

Highest point
- Elevation: 5,380 m (17,650 ft)
- Coordinates: 15°15′20″S 72°11′3″W

Naming
- Language of name: Aymara

Geography
- Location: Peru, Arequipa Region
- Parent range: Andes, Chila

Huayllatarpuna (possibly from Quechua waylla meadow, tarpuy to sow, -na a suffix, "where the meadow is sown") is a mountain in the Chila mountain range in the Andes of Peru, about 5,300 metres (17,388 ft) high. It is situated in the Arequipa Region, Castilla Province, Chachas District. Huayllatarpuna lies in a remote, mountainous area east of Orcopampa. la primera ascencion fue realizada por Rolando Huamani Cueva en agosto del 2017.
