= Huañacagua =

Mountain in Peru

- Location within Peru

Highest point
- Elevation: 5,200 m (17,100 ft)
- Coordinates: 15°19′48″S 72°14′30″W

Naming
- Language of name: Quechua

Geography
- Location: Peru, Arequipa Region
- Parent range: Andes, Chila

Huañacagua (possibly from Aymara waña dry, q'awa little river, ditch, crevice, fissure, gap in the earth, "dry brook" or "dry ravine") is a mountain in the Chila mountain range in the Andes of Peru, about 5,200 metres (17,060 ft) high. It is situated in the Arequipa Region, Castilla Province, Chachas District. Huañacagua lies northwest of Chuañuma and southwest of Aceruta.
