= Chuañuma =

Mountain in Peru

- Location within Peru

Highest point
- Elevation: 5,400 m (17,700 ft)
- Coordinates: 15°22′9″S 72°13′39″W

Naming
- Language of name: Aymara

Geography
- Location: Peru, Arequipa Region, Castilla Province
- Parent range: Andes

Chuañuma (possibly from Aymara ch'uwaña oozing of water and other liquids / melting of metals and other things, uma water, "oozing water") is a mountain in the Andes of Peru, about 5,400 metres (17,717 ft) high. It is situated in the Arequipa Region, Castilla Province, Chachas District. Chuañuma lies south-east of the mountain Huañacagua at a valley named Puncuhuaico (possibly from Quechua for "pond valley" or "dam valley"). Its stream flows to Chachas.

== See also ==
- Asiruta
