= Ticlla (Cacamayo) =

Mountain in Peru

- Location within Peru

Highest point
- Elevation: 4,800 m (15,700 ft)
- Coordinates: 15°20′38″S 72°07′45″W

Naming
- Language of name: Quechua

Geography
- Location: Peru, Arequipa Region
- Parent range: Andes, Chila

Ticlla (possibly from Quechua for eyelash; two-colored, or for 'with alternating colors') is a mountain in the Chila mountain range in the Andes of Peru, about 4,800 m (15,700 ft) high. It is located in the Arequipa Region, Castilla Province, Chachas District. Tiklla lies at the Cacamayo (possibly from Quechua for "rock river"), east of Huayllayoc and southeast of Huamanripayoq.
