= Chila Pillune =

Mountain in Peru

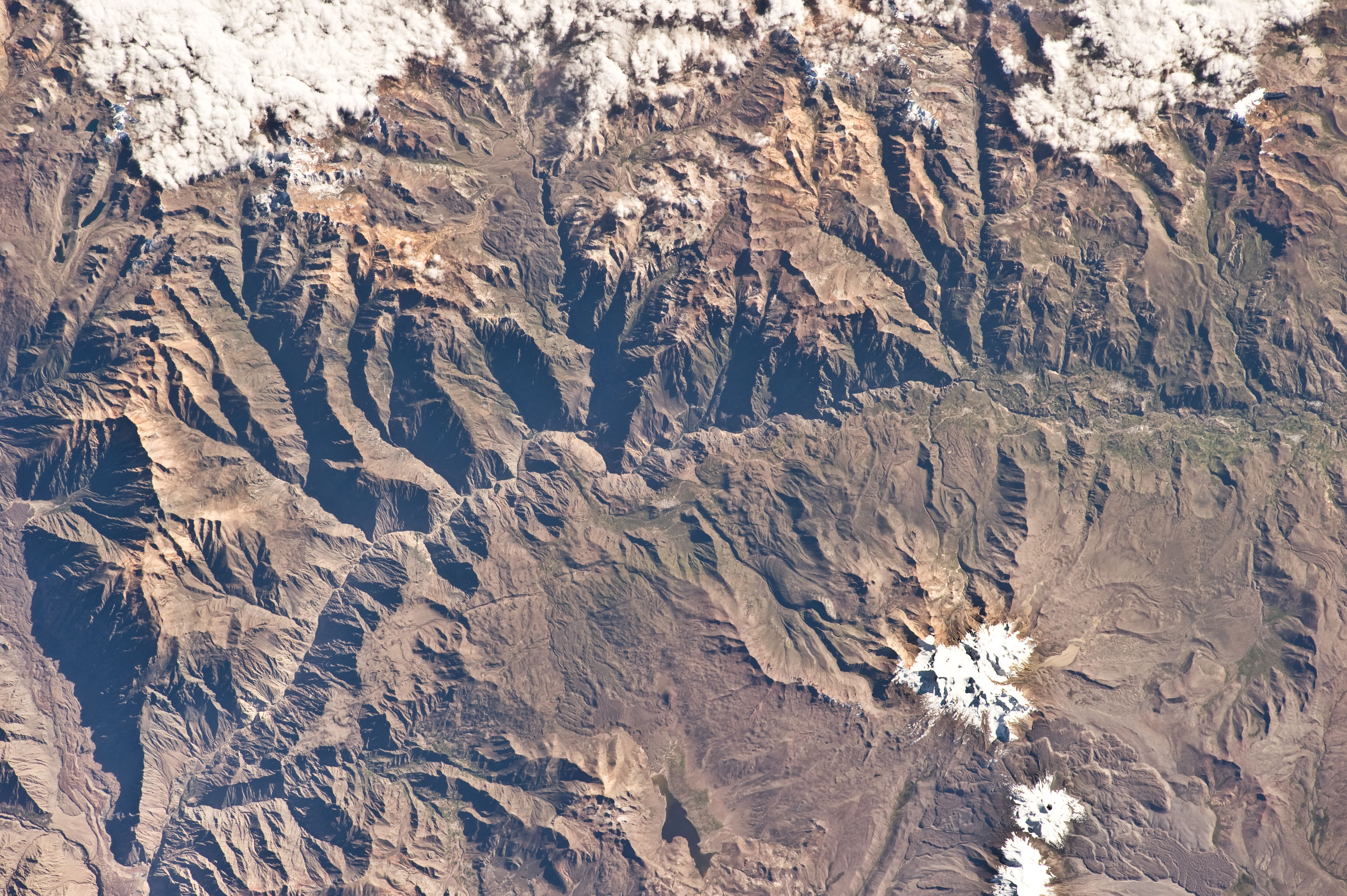
- The Colca River and Chila Pillune northwest of it (upper left) as seen from the ISS

Highest point
- Elevation: 5,400 m (17,700 ft)
- Coordinates: 15°24′26″S 72°11′16″W

Geography
- Location within Peru
- Location: Peru, Arequipa Region, Castilla Province
- Parent range: Andes, Chila

Chila Pillune (possibly from Aymara pillu crown or cord which some indigenous peoples use to tighten their hair, -ni a suffix to indicate ownership, pilluni "the one with a crown" or "the one with a pillu") is a mountain in the western part of the Chila mountain range in the Andes of Peru, about 5,328 m (17,480 ft) high. It lies in the Arequipa Region, Castilla Province, Chachas District. Chila Pillune is situated west of Chila, the highest mountain of the range, northeast of Ticlla and south of Apacheta.
