= Chila (Castilla-Caylloma) =

Mountain in Peru

Ch'ila
- Location within Peru

Highest point
- Elevation: 5,111.2 m (16,769 ft)
- Coordinates: 15°10′5″S 71°54′8″W

Geography
- Location: Peru, Arequipa Region, Castilla Province, Caylloma Province
- Parent range: Andes

Chila is a mountain in the Andes of Peru, about 5,111.2 metres (16,769 ft) high. It lies in the Arequipa Region, Castilla Province, Choco District, and in the Caylloma Province, Caylloma District. Chila is situated southeast of the lake Llocococha (possibly from in the Quechua spelling Lluk'uqucha).
