= Teclla (mountain) =

Mountain in Peru

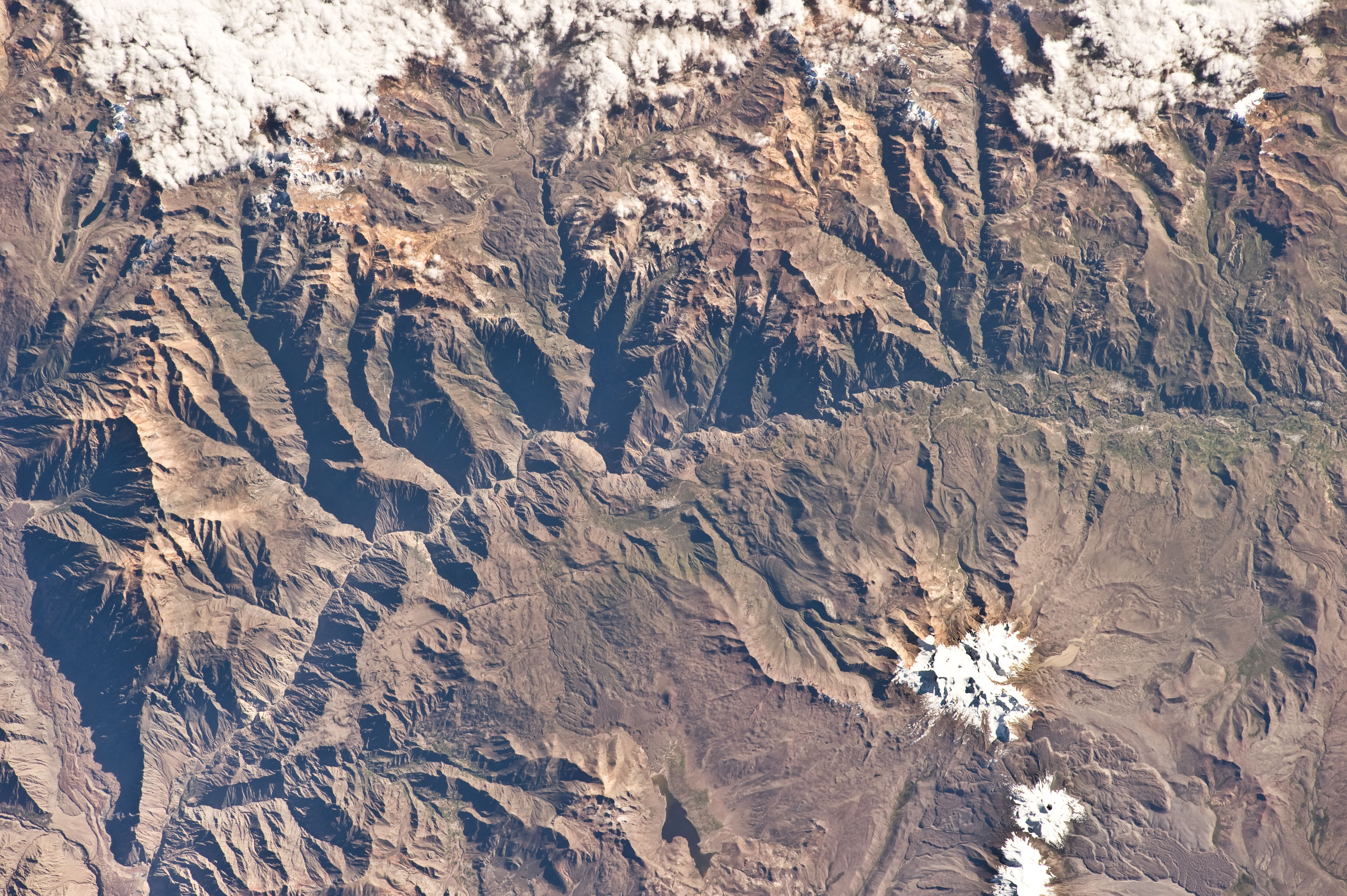
- The Colca River and Teclla north of it at the upper rim of this image as seen from the ISS

Highest point
- Elevation: 5,360 m (17,590 ft)
- Coordinates: 15°27′25″S 71°46′12″W

Naming
- Language of name: Quechua

Geography
- Location within Peru
- Location: Peru, Arequipa Region
- Parent range: Andes, Chila

Teclla (possibly from Quechua for eyelash; two-colored, or for 'with alternating colors') is a 5,360-metre-high (17,590 ft) mountain in the Chila mountain range in the Andes of Peru. It is located in the Arequipa Region, Caylloma Province, Lari District. Teclla lies northwest of Mismi and Quehuisha.
