= Yuraccacsa (Arequipa) =

Mountain in Peru

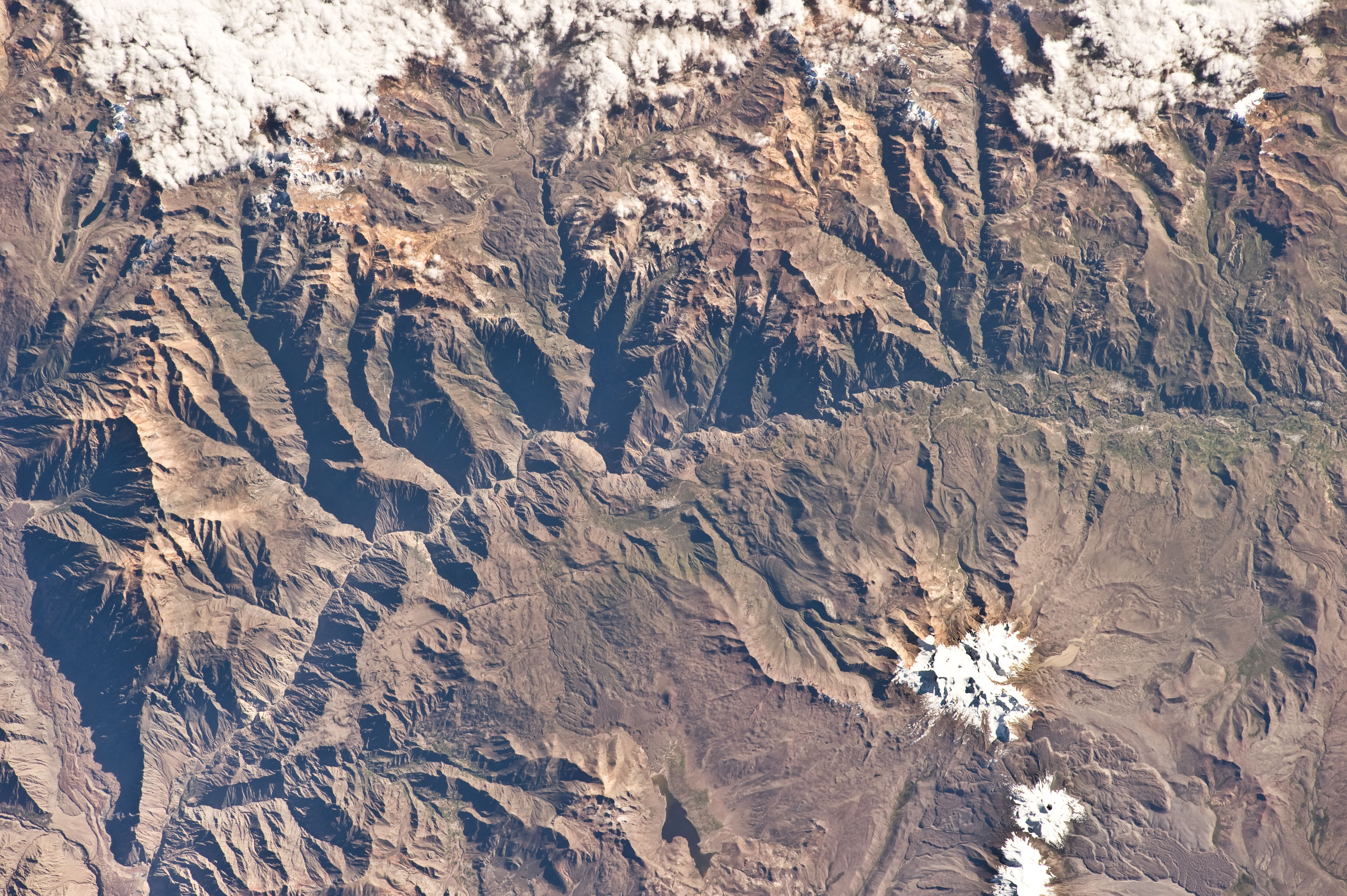
- The Colca River and Yuraccacsa northwest of it (upper left) as seen from the ISS

Highest point
- Elevation: 5,465 m (17,930 ft)
- Coordinates: 15°26′53″S 72°09′45″W

Naming
- Language of name: Quechua

Geography
- Location within Peru
- Location: Peru, Arequipa Region
- Parent range: Andes, Chila

Yuraccacsa or Yuraccasa (possibly from Quechua yuraq white, q'asa mountain pass, "white mountain pass") is a 5,465-metre-high (17,930 ft) mountain in the west of the Chila mountain range in the Andes of Peru. It is located in the Arequipa Region, Castilla Province, on the border of the districts Chachas and Choco. Yuraccacsa lies south of Chila, the highest mountain in the range, and Choquepirhua, southeast of Asnohuañusja and northeast of a lake named Cochapunco (possibly from Quechua for "lake reservoir") and the peaks of Cerani and Casiri.
