= Machucocha =

Mountain in Peru

- Location within Peru
- Location: Peru; Arequipa Region
- Coordinates: 15°03′24″S 72°06′51″W
- Max. length: 6.77 km (4.21 mi)
- Max. width: 1.89 km (1.17 mi)
- Surface elevation: 4,659 m (15,285 ft)

Machucocha (possibly from Quechua machu old, old person, qucha lake) is a lake in Peru located in the Arequipa Region, Castilla Province, in the districts of Chachas and Orcopampa. It is situated at a height of about 4,659 m (15,285 ft), about 6.77 km long and 1.89 km at its widest point. Machucocha lies southeast of Huajrahuire and northwest of Pillune.
