= Castilla province =

Coordinates: 16.086011°S 72.487611°W

Castilla
- Province
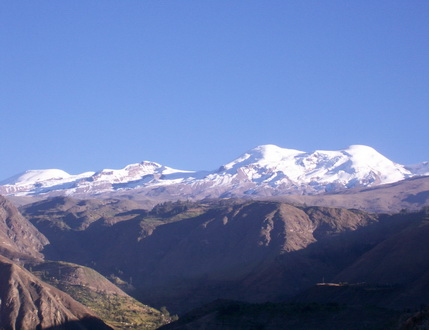
- Coropuna as seen from Tipan

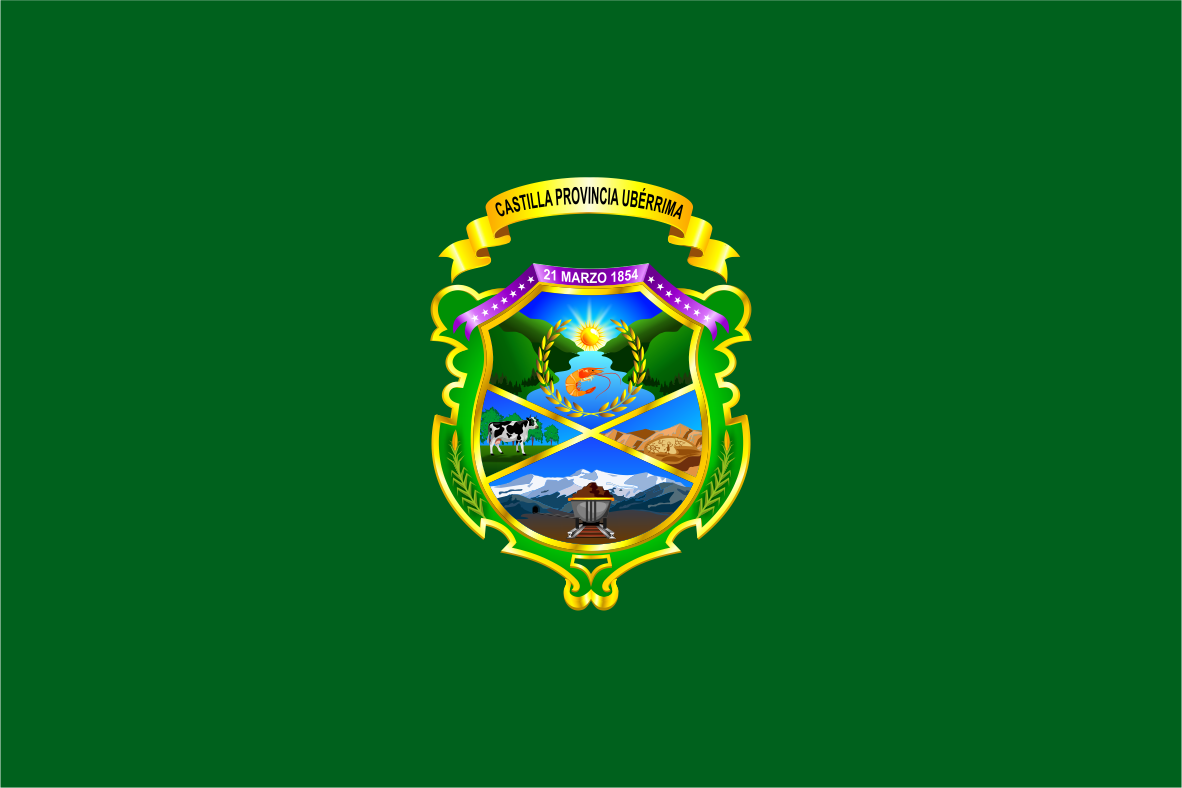
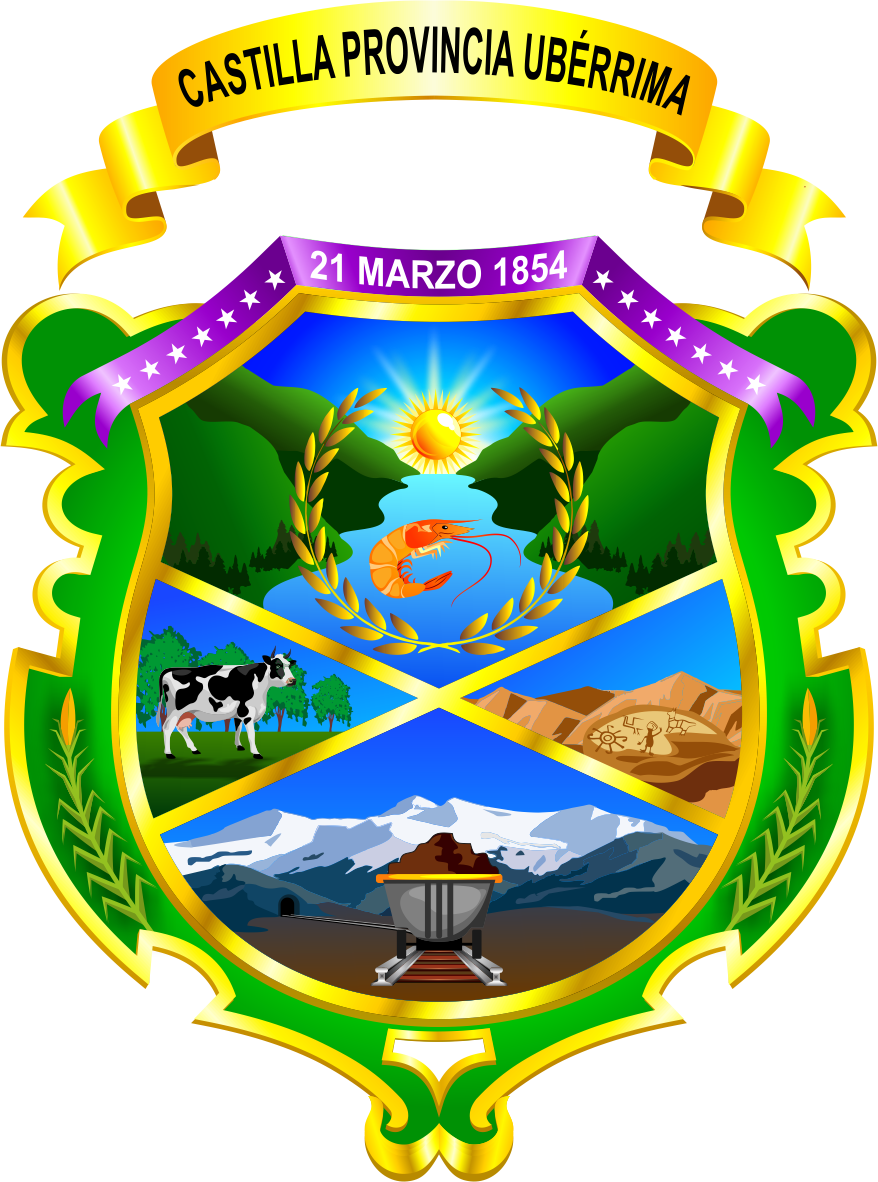
- Flag Coat of arms

- Location of Castilla in the Arequipa Region
- Country: Peru
- Region: Arequipa
- Founded: 1854
- Capital: Aplao

Government
  - Mayor: Gilder Edy Medina Collado (2007)

Area
  - Total: 6,914.48 km^{2} (2,669.70 sq mi)

Population (2005 census)
  - Total: 36,568
  - Density: 5.2886/km^{2} (13.697/sq mi)
- UBIGEO: 0404
- Website: www.municipiocastilla.gob.pe

Castilla is one of eight provinces in the Arequipa Region of Peru. It was named after Ramón Castilla.

== Geography ==
The Chila mountain range traverses the province. One of the highest mountains of the province is Coropuna at 6,425 m (21,079 ft) above sea level. Other mountains are listed below:

- Apachita
- Asiruta
- Asnu Wañusqa
- Ayri Qutu
- Challwani
- Chila
- Chinchun
- Chuqi P'unqu
- Chuqi Pirwa
- Chila (Cast.-Caylloma)
- Chila Pilluni
- Ch'illkayuq
- Ch'uwañuma
- Ikma
- Janq'u Qala
- Kimsa Chata
- Kiska P'anqa
- Kuntur
- Kuntur Qaqa
- Kunturkhacha
- Llallawi
- Minasniyuq
- Pampa Qullqa
- Puka Mawras
- Puka Mawras (Andagua)
- Puma Ranra
- Pilluni
- Phusuqu
- P'aqu Urqu
- P'isqi P'isqi
- Qallwa
- Qaqamayu
- Qinchaña
- Qullpa
- Q'illa Q'illa
- Q'illu Q'illu
- Qillqani
- Sama Q'asa
- Sani
- Sawsi
- Sukna
- Sulimana
- Sulluku Llawa
- Sunqu
- Tiklla
- Tiklla (Qaqamayu)
- Tuqlla Tuqlla
- T'iksu
- Uqi Q'asa
- Usqullu
- Wakapallqa
- Waman Quri
- Wamanripayuq
- Wanqa
- Waña Q'awa
- Waqrawiri
- Waylla Tarpuna
- Wayrani
- Wayta
- Wayta Kuntur Sinqa
- Wayllayuq
- Willkani
- Yana Mawras
- Yana Qaqa
- Yana Urqu
- Yanawara
- Yanqha
- Yuraq Q'asa

Machuqucha is one of the largest lakes in the province.

== Political division ==
The province is divided into fourteen districts which are, with its capital in parentheses:

- Andagua (Andagua)
- Aplao (Aplao)
- Ayo (Ayo)
- Chachas (Chachas)
- Chilcaymarca (Chilcaymarca)
- Choco (Choco)
- Huancarqui (Huancarqui)
- Machaguay (Machaguay)
- Orcopampa (Orcopampa)
- Pampacolca (Pampacolca)
- Tipán (Tipán)
- Uñón (Uñón)
- Uraca (Corire)
- Viraco (Viraco)

== Ethnic groups ==
The province is inhabited by indigenous citizens of Aymara and Quechua descent, as well as European descendants of Spanish settlers. Spanish, is the language which the majority of the population (79.72%) learnt to speak in childhood, 18.52% of the residents started speaking using the Quechua language and 1.51% using Aymara (2007 Peru Census).

== See also ==
- Antamayu
- Mawk'allaqta
