= Cerani (mountain) =

Mountain in Peru

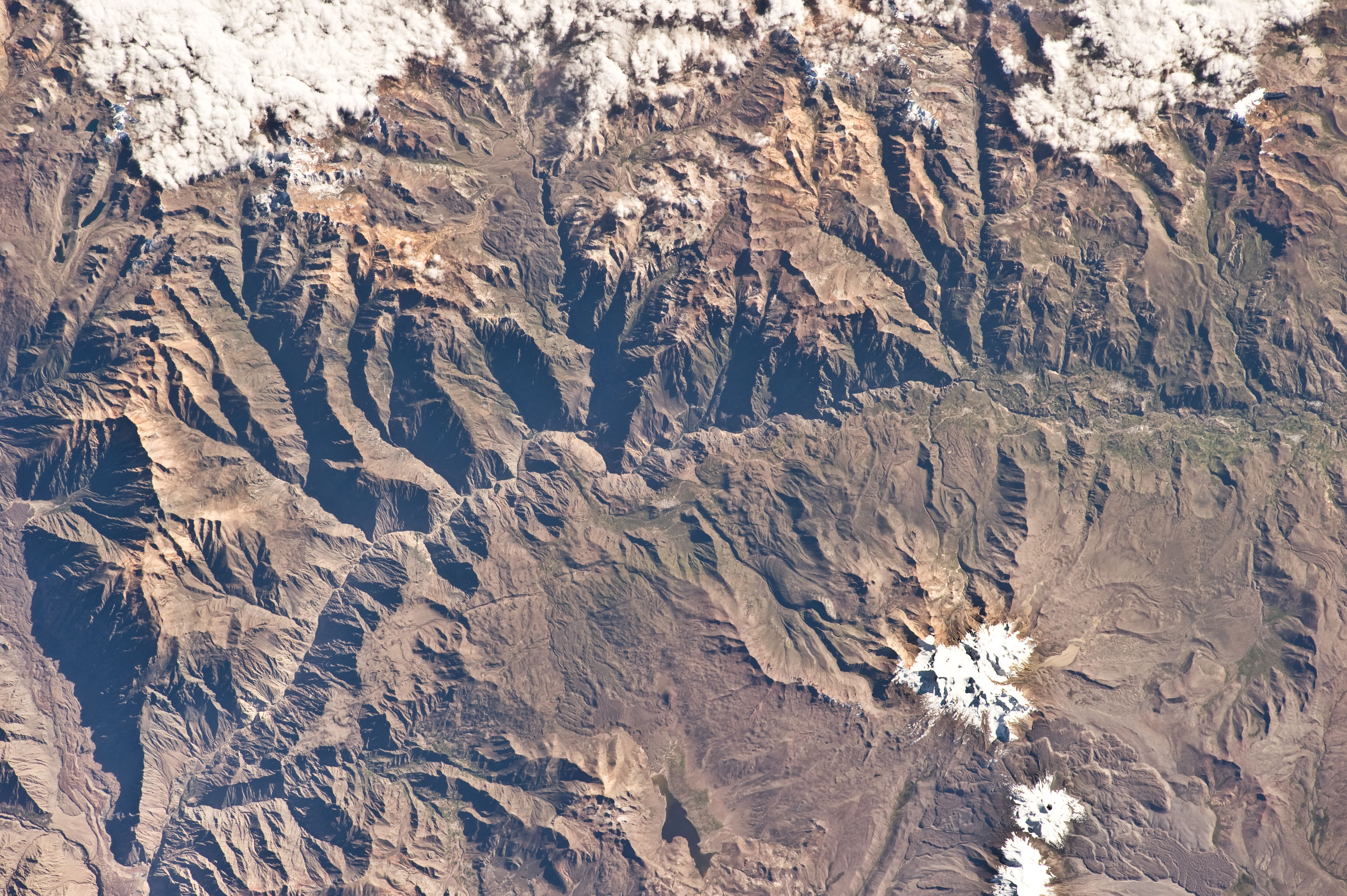
- The Colca River and Cerani north of it (upper left) as seen from the ISS

Highest point
- Elevation: 5,229 m (17,156 ft)
- Coordinates: 15°29′24.5″S 72°10′46.8″W

Naming
- Language of name: Quechua

Geography
- Location within Peru
- Location: Peru, Arequipa Region
- Parent range: Andes, Chila

Cerani (possibly from Aymara sira fart, flatulence, -ni a suffix to indicate ownership, "the one with flatulence") is a mountain in the west of the Chila mountain range in the Andes of Peru, about 5,229 metres (17,156 ft) high. It is located in the Arequipa Region, Castilla Province, on the border of the districts Chachas and Choco. Cerani lies northeast of the lake Chachas, southeast of a lake named Cochapunco (possibly from Quechua for "lake reservoir") and southwest of Yuraccacsa and Casiri near the volcanic zone in the west.
