= Huayllayoc =

Mountain in Peru

- Location within Peru

Highest point
- Elevation: 5,300 m (17,400 ft)
- Coordinates: 15°20′35″S 72°9′53″W

Naming
- Language of name: Quechua

Geography
- Location: Peru, Arequipa Region
- Parent range: Andes, Chila

Huayllayoc (possibly from Quechua waylla meadow, -yuq a suffix to indicate ownership, "the one with a meadow") is a mountain in the Chila in the Andes of Peru, about 5,300 metres (17,388 ft) high. It is located in the Arequipa Region, Castilla Province, Chachas District. Huayllayoc lies at the river Cacamayo (possibly from Quechua for "rock river") which later is named Collpamayo (possibly from Quechua for "salpeter river"). Its waters flow to the Colca River.
