= Orcopampa District =

Coordinates: 15.2683°S 72.3214°W

Orcopampa Urqupampa
- District
- Interactive map of Orcopampa
- Country: Peru
- Region: Arequipa
- Province: Castilla
- Capital: Orcopampa

Government
  - Mayor: Aurelio Nicolas Vilca Giraldo

Area
  - Total: 724.37 km^{2} (279.68 sq mi)
- Elevation: 3,779 m (12,398 ft)

Population (2005 census)
  - Total: 6,444
  - Density: 8.896/km^{2} (23.04/sq mi)
- Time zone: UTC-5 (PET)
- UBIGEO: 040409

Orcopampa District is one of fourteen districts of the province Castilla in Peru.

== See also ==
- Machuqucha
- Sawsi
- Waman Quri
- Waqrawiri
