= Chila (Castilla) =

Mountain in Peru

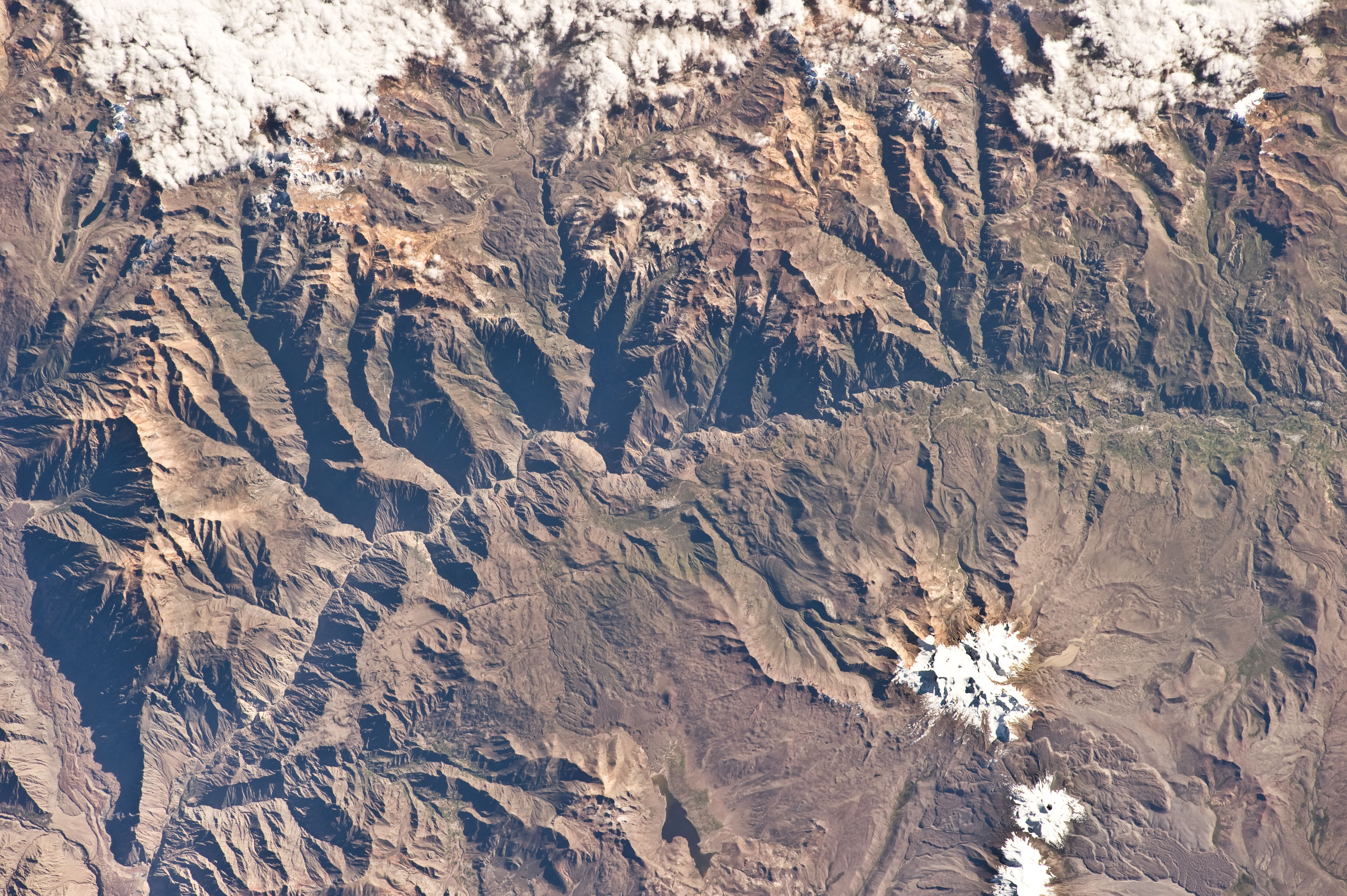
- The Colca River and Chila north of it (upper left) as seen from the ISS

Highest point
- Elevation: 5,654 m (18,550 ft)
- Coordinates: 15°24′23″S 72°9′59″W

Geography
- Location within Peru
- Location: Peru, Arequipa Region, Castilla Province
- Parent range: Andes, Chila

Climbing
- First ascent: 1941

Chila is a mountain in the Chila mountain range in the Andes of Peru, about 5,654 m (18,550 ft) high. It is located in the Arequipa Region, Castilla Province, on the border of the districts of Chachas and Choco. Chila lies north of Chuqi Pirwa.

== See also ==
- Q'asiri
- Sirani
- Yuraq Q'asa
