= Aceruta =

Mountain in the Andes of Peru

- Location within Peru

Highest point
- Elevation: 5,400 m (17,700 ft)
- Coordinates: 15°18′52″S 72°13′8″W

Naming
- Language of name: Aymara

Geography
- Location: Peru, Arequipa Region
- Parent range: Andes

Aceruta (possibly from Aymara asiru snail, uta house, "snail" or -ta a suffix, "from the snail") is a mountain in the Andes of Peru, about 5,400 metres (17,717 ft) high. It is situated in the Arequipa Region, Castilla Province, Chachas District. It lies north-west of the mountain Huayta and north-east of the mountain Huañacagua.

== See also ==
- Chuañuma
