= Ampato =

Dormant stratovolcano in southern Peru

- Nudo de Ampato, Ambato
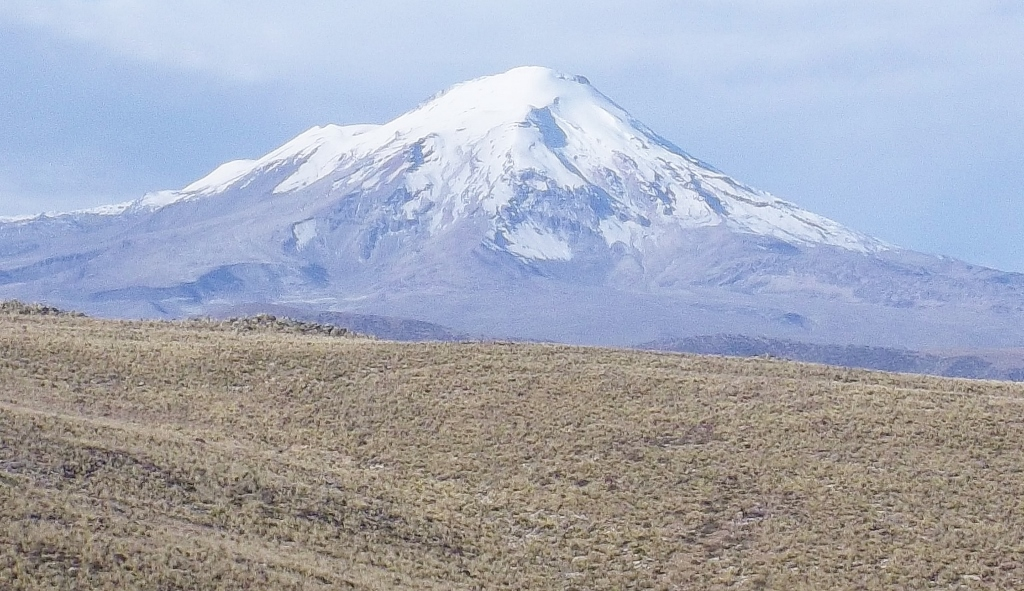

Highest point
- Elevation: 6,288 m (20,630 ft)
- Prominence: 1,997 m (6,552 ft)
- Listing: Ultra
- Coordinates: 15°49′14″S 71°52′48″W

Geography
- Location within Peru
- Location: Arequipa, Peru
- Parent range: Andes

Geology
- Rock age: Pleistocene
- Mountain type: Stratovolcano
- Volcanic belt: Central Volcanic Zone
- Last eruption: Unknown

Climbing
- First ascent: Inca, pre-Columbian
- Easiest route: snow / glacier climb

Ampato (possibly from Quechua hamp'atu meaning "frog" ) is a dormant 6,288-metre (20,630 ft) stratovolcano in the Andes of southern Peru. It lies about 70–75 kilometres (43–47 mi) northwest of Arequipa and is part of a north-south chain that includes the volcanoes Hualca Hualca and Sabancaya, the last of which has been historically active.

Ampato consists of three volcanic cones, which lie on top of an older eroded volcanic edifice. They were formed sequentially by extrusion of lava flows, but Ampato has also had explosive eruptions which have deposited ash, lapilli and pumice in the surrounding landscape. One young lava flow has been dated to 17,000 ± 6,000 years before present, but a summit lava dome is even younger, and Holocene ash layers in surrounding peat bogs may testify to the occurrence of recent eruptions.

The present-day volcano is covered by an ice cap, and during the Last Glacial Maximum glaciers advanced to low altitudes. In 1995, an Inca mummy known as Mummy Juanita was discovered on Ampato by Johan Reinhard; it had been offered as a human sacrifice around five hundred years earlier on the mountain.

== Geography and geomorphology ==
Ampato is in the Occidental Cordillera of the Andes. It is part of a subrange, the Cordillera Ampato, which is either defined as a group of volcanoes northeast of Arequipa (from Sara Sara to Ampato) or as the mountains south of the Colca Canyon. Ampato forms the southern end of a 20 kilometres (12 mi) long chain of volcanoes with Hualca Hualca and Sabancaya, the last of which has been historically active. About 10 kilometres (6.2 mi) to the northwest of Ampato is the lake Laguna Mucurca.

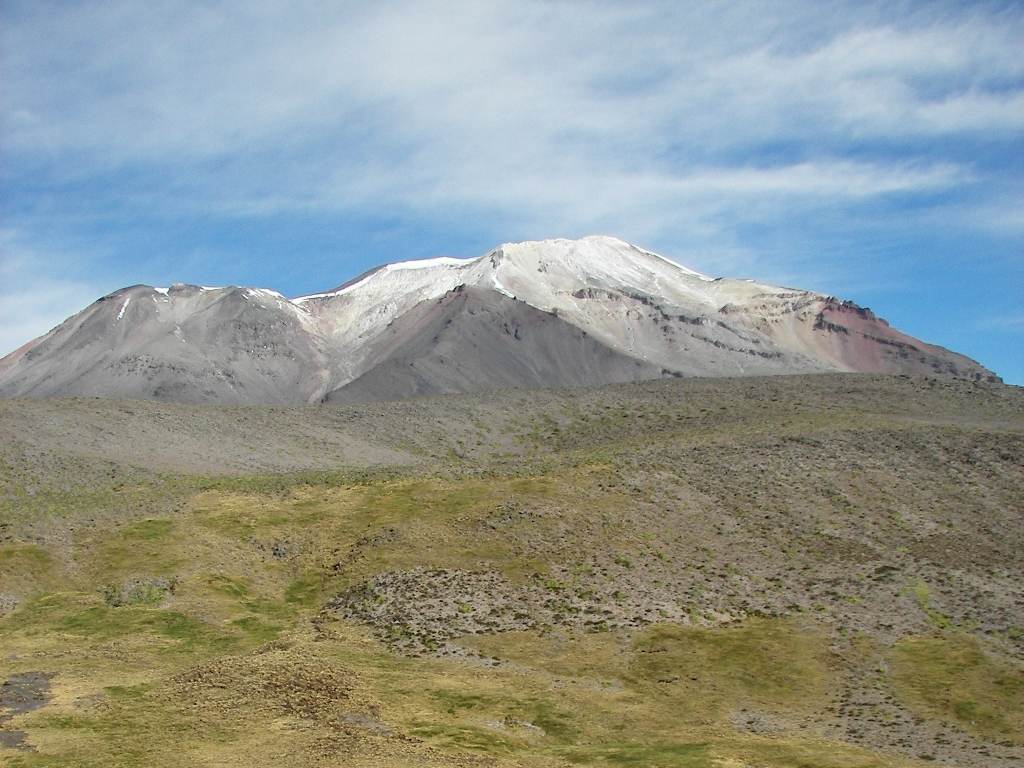
Ampato seen from west

The volcano Ampato consists of three individual steep-sided cones aligned southwest-northeast, which rise from a gentle glacially eroded foot and are made out of lava flows and subordinate pyroclastic flow deposits. The mountain looks like a symmetrical cone when viewed from the west. On the eastern side, several volcanic craters cover a rocky spur, and there are traces of a possible crater in the summit area. The volcano lacks pronounced cliffs, except on its southern side where volcanic rocks emerge from the ice cap, and shows only weak evidence of glacial erosion. The volume of the edifice is about 38–42 cubic kilometres (9.1–10.1 cu mi), it covers an area of about 90–100 square kilometres (35–39 sq mi). To the south, the volcano rises above the Siguas Valley; the Siguas River originates close to Ampato.

The highest summit reaches an altitude of 6,280 metres (20,600 ft) or 6,288 metres (20,630 ft) above sea level. Ampato is one of the highest volcanoes in the Central Volcanic Zone and the 35th highest summit in the Andes. Other values for Ampato's height appear in the literature; some early estimates had it approach 7,000 metres (23,000 ft) and it was sometimes considered the highest peak in the Occidental Cordillera. The volcano is higher than its neighbour Sabancaya. The mountains of the Ampato-Sabancaya-Hualca Hualca mountain chain rise 1.5–2 kilometres (0.93–1.24 mi) above the surrounding highlands.

Sabancaya forms a northward extension of Ampato, with lava flows from both volcanoes there. Some flows from Sabancaya were deflected , and scoria deposits on Ampato's northeastern flank may have originated from explosive eruptions of either Ampato or Sabancaya.

=== Ice cap and glaciation ===
The summit of the volcano is covered with a (as of 2019) 2 square kilometres (0.77 sq mi) ice cap, which resembles these of subpolar regions. It has an elongated shape, stretching north-northeastward to Sabancaya. On the southern and southeastern slopes, the ice reached the lower altitudes. Some glaciers are short and steep. The ice at the summit of Ampato reaches a thickness of 50 metres (160 ft); in 1946 the ice cap covered the entire mountain with a uniform ice cover. Glacial streams drain from the ice cap, tropical ice caps in the Andes are an important source of water in the region. The ice cap is frequently impacted by eruptions of Sabancaya, which sprinkle it with volcanic ash.

The edifice is incised by cirques and glacial valleys, and the surrounding terrain features traces of past glaciation. The volcano is surrounded by three sets of moraines, the lowermost one at 4,250–4,450 metres (13,940–14,600 ft) elevation has been attributed to the Last Glacial Maximum between 25,000-17,000 years ago, the middle one between 4,400–4,650 metres (14,440–15,260 ft) to a late readvance at the Pleistocene-Holocene epoch boundary and the higher ones above 4,800 metres (15,700 ft) to Holocene advances. Evidence of the Little Ice Age is sparse. Earlier sources distinguished five possible glacier stages in the Ampato-Sabancaya-Hualca Hualca complex, named Ampato I through V. In 2011, perennial snow in the region covered mountains above 5,300 metres (17,400 ft) altitude. Glaciers in the region are retreating, owing to a combination of a drier climate and rising temperatures: Ice retreat was noted already between 1937 and 1946, and by 2010 the ice cap on Ampato had noticeably shrunk.

Most knowledge about glaciation in the Cordillera Ampato pertains to Coropuna. The past glaciations at Ampato and its neighbours might have covered an area of 347 square kilometres (134 sq mi). The extent of glaciation on Ampato and other mountains of the Cordillera Ampato is governed by the proximity to the arid Atacama Desert and the distance that Amazon moisture has to travel to reach the mountains; during the Last Glacial Maximum the climate was not only colder but also wetter, leading to widespread glaciation in the region. One manifestation of this precipitation dependence is that maximum extent of glaciers in southern Peru does not coincide with the global Last Glacial Maximum but rather by the "Lake Tauca" wet period.

=== Access and human geography ===
Access to the volcano is typically from the road between Chivay and Arequipa. About 12 kilometres (7.5 mi) a dirt road departs to the west-southwest, which heads to Lluta. Close to the town of Cajamarcana a path or road to Ampato begins. A basecamp exists at 4,500 metres (14,800 ft) altitude on the east-southeast side. Two other ascent paths (used by Inka) lead to Ampato from its northwestern flank, and there are Inka ceremonial platforms and ceremonial roads on Ampato. The first reported ascent during modern times was done in 1966 by Richard Revis "Dick" Culbert (1940-2017) of Canada. The terrain around Ampato is rough, being wavy with rocky or sandy terrain where water is scarce.

Politically Ampato is in the Arequipa Department of the Arequipa Province. Clockwise from northeast the towns of Colihuiri, Cajamarcana, Sallalli, Japo, Baylillas, Corinta and Collpa surround the volcano; the city of Arequipa lies 70–75 kilometres (43–47 mi) to the southeast. Agriculture and pastures are the principal economic activities in the region. Ampato and neighbouring Sabancaya are an important tourist destination of countrywide importance.

== Geology ==
Off the western coast of South America, the Nazca Plate subducts beneath the South America Plate at a rate of 5–6 centimetres per year (2.0–2.4 in/year). The subduction started during the Jurassic period after the opening of the southern Atlantic Ocean, which triggered the onset of subduction of the Nazca Plate. This subduction process causes volcanism in the Andean Volcanic Belt, which features four individual volcanic zones: Northern Volcanic Zone, Central Volcanic Zone (CVZ), Southern Volcanic Zone and Austral Volcanic Zone (linked to the subduction of the Antarctic Plate). Ampato is part of the CVZ, which extends through in Peru, Bolivia and Chile. In Peru, the CVZ includes several dozen Pleistocene volcanoes, some of which erupted in historical time including El Misti, Huaynaputina, Sabancaya and Ubinas. The largest historical eruption of the Andes took place at Huaynaputina. Other volcanoes in the Peruvian Central Volcanic Zone are Sara Sara, Solimana, Coropuna, Andagua volcanic field-Huambo volcanic field, Chachani, Ticsani, Tutupaca, Yucamane, Purupuruni and Casiri. Of these, Sabancaya and Ubinas are the most active.

Volcanic arc-associated volcanism originally occurred within the Cordillera de la Costa in the Jurassic, but later it migrated resulting in the emplacement of the Tacaza and Toquepala groups and finally the Neogene Barroso group. The present-day volcanic arc is situated in the area of the Barroso group but has a narrower extent. The pre-volcanic basement consists of 1.9-1.0-billion-year-old rocks of the "Arequipa Massif", which consists of gneiss and granulite. They are covered by the Yura Group of the Mesozoic and the Mesozoic-Paleogene Tiabaya unit; the former consists of marine sediments and the latter of volcanic sediments intruded by plutons. The Tacaza and Barroso groups are emplaced on the sediments. The Ampato volcanic rocks are sometimes classified as being part of the Barroso Group and sometimes as an Ampato Group; the latter contains all Quaternary volcanism in the region and is named after Ampato.

The basement beneath Ampato is formed by sedimentary and volcanic rocks of the Western Cordillera of Peru, and the rocks are of Mesozoic to Cenozoic age. A high plateau formed by ignimbrites and lavas of Pliocene to Miocene age rises above this basement. The terrain is cut by several different fault systems; one of these, the northeastward striking Sepina fault has been seismically active in the 20th and 21st centuries and seems to have controlled the development of the Ampato and Sabancaya volcanoes. A distinct northwest-southeast trending geologic lineament, which underlies Ampato and may continue under Coropuna, Misti, Sara Sara and Solimana, might control the position of the volcanic centres, and the historically active Mucurca-Ampato-Casablanca fault runs in the same direction and could have influenced the position of springs around the volcano.

=== Composition ===
Ampato has erupted different volcanic rocks at different stages, with the earliest ones generating andesite and dacite and which define a potassium-rich calc-alkaline suite typical for Central Andes volcanoes. The rocks contain amphibole, biotite, iron oxide, olivine, plagioclase, pyroxene and titanium oxide.

The magmas derive from mantle melts, but undergo additional differentiation processes before reaching the surface. Processes such as fractional crystallization, magma mixing and the absorption of crustal material by developing magmas have been invoked to explain the formation of the magmas of both Ampato and Sabancaya. Estimating the rate of magma production at Ampato is difficult owing to the uncertainties in determining the volume of the edifice and the duration of repose times between eruptions; on average it appears to be 0.08–0.09 cubic kilometres per millennium (0.019–0.022 mi^{3}/ka). This rate does not consider "spurt"-like behaviour; volcano growth in fits and spurts has been observed at many other volcanic arc volcanoes. The rate is about one order of magnitude less than at neighbouring Sabancaya volcano.

== Climate and vegetation ==
Above 5,400 metres (17,700 ft), temperatures are always below freezing. The mean temperature increases downward, eventually ranging 10.2 °C (50.4 °F) at Chivay at 3,651 metres (11,978 ft) elevation. The area has fairly stable temperatures, with annual variability not exceeding 6 °C (11 °F) at Chachani not far from Ampato. Night frosts can occur everywhere. Most precipitation (about 390 millimetres (15 in) per year at Coropuna) falls during summer (December-March), when moisture arrives from the Atlantic Ocean due to the South American Summer Monsoon and the seasonal migration of the Intertropical Convergence Zone. Warm El Niño-Southern Oscillation events are frequently linked to dry weather in the mountains and wetter conditions at the coast, and vice versa for the cold phases.

The Western Cordillera features various climate zones, such as the quechua and suni zones. Up to 3,800 metres (12,500 ft) altitude the natural vegetation consists of grasses and cactuses. The terrain surrounding Ampato is desert-like, with only sparse vegetation dominated by pioneer plants. Mosses reach elevations of 5,700 metres (18,700 ft). Among the plants noted around Ampato are ichu grass, tola bushes (both used for pasture) and Polylepis trees. Peatlands occur in the valleys, with wetlands constituting additional centres of biodiversity. The Andean condor occurs at Ampato.

== Eruptive history ==
Growth of Ampato and Sabancaya commenced no earlier than 800,000 years ago. A 200–600-metre (660–1,970 ft) thick pile of andesitic lava flows with additional scoria and which crops out on the southern, southeastern and southwestern side of the Ampato volcano is the oldest volcanic stage of this volcano, with argon-argon dating yielding ages between 400,000 - 450,000 years before present. Above this formation, another pile of dacitic lava flows constructed the first Ampato edifice, which was about the same size as the present-day volcano. This pile ("Moldepampa stage") is about 200–300 metres (660–980 ft) thick in outcrops and was emplaced between 230,000 - 200,000 years before present.

After a pause in volcanic activity and an intermediary stage ("Yanajaja stage"; one date obtained on this stage is 77,000 ± 4,000 years before present) that produced andesitic-dacitic lava flows which form a 200–300-metre (660–980 ft) thick unit on top of eroded remnants of the older Ampato volcanics, the andesitic northern cone formed as the first of the three present-day cones. The southern cone developed in several different stages; a first stage generated lava flows emanating from the summit; dating of two such flows has produced ages of 34,000 ± 8,000 and 40,000 ± 3,000 years before present. More than 20 metres (66 ft) of block-and-ash flows was erupted onto the eastern and western flanks of Ampato, and these flows consist of one andesitic and one dacitic formation; both appear to relate to a lava dome forming stage of volcanic activity. These block-and-ash flows are themselves covered on both the eastern and the western flanks by more thick lava flows, which make up a 150–200 metres (490–660 ft) thick unit and again consist of one andesitic and one dacitic unit; both units appear to have been erupted during the last glacial maximum.

Either during or before the last glacial maximum, multiple explosive eruptions of Ampato produced the Baylillas and the Corinta tephra deposits. The first consists of lapilli, pumice and scoria and individual layers form thick sequences at large distances from the volcano, but are heavily eroded and thus difficult to measure in extent. Scoria flows identified on the southwestern-southern flanks of Ampato correspond to this unit. The dacitic Corinta deposits conversely were created during one large eruption which also left a crater on Ampato; it generated stratified 3–4-metre (9.8–13.1 ft) thick tephra deposits which contain pumice embedded within ash-rich layers, and it is probably also the source of the pumice flow deposits on the south-southwestern flank. These contain dacitic pumice fragments in a matrix rich in ash and have thicknesses of more than 10 metres (33 ft) in the few outcrops; much of this unit was likely eroded away by glacial activity. Some volcanic rocks of Ampato were later overlain by lava flows from Sabancaya.

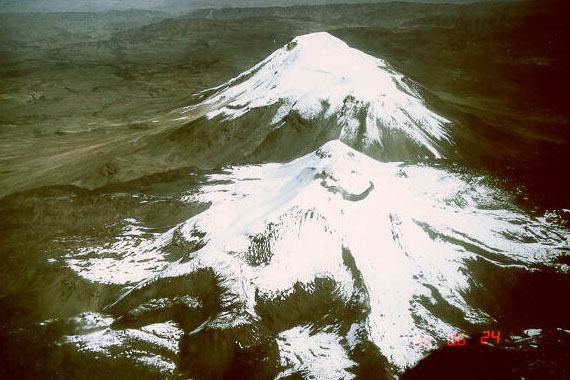
Aerial view of Ampato (back) from the northeast, with the active volcano Sabancaya in front.

The central cone grew in the gap between the northern and southern edifice and consists of lava flows again of andesitic to dacitic composition. These flows are together maximally 400–600 metres (1,300–2,000 ft) thick and one flow has been dated to 17,000 ± 6,000 years before present. A dacitic summit lava dome is not affected by glacial erosion and appears to be the youngest eruption product of Ampato.

Some lava flows have a young appearance. Early Holocene (11,000 - 8,000 years before present) ash layers in peat bogs around the volcano may have originated either on Ampato or on Sabancaya. Late Holocene tephra layers dated to 1,790 ± 110, 2,050 ± 70 and 4,500 ± 125 likewise may have been erupted from Ampato, but Sabancaya is a more likely source for these ash layers. There are no known historical eruptions; reports of historical activity of Ampato do not distinguish between Ampato proper and Sabancaya, and probably refer to Sabancaya. The formation of the Mulapampa travertine close to Huambo and of sulfuric acid-eroded caves there may be linked to Ampato, but there is no evidence of present-day hydrothermal activity at the surface of volcano. Electric potential studies have found what might be a hydrothermal system under Ampato, which may be connected to the system under Sabancaya.

=== Hazards ===
Presently, Ampato is considered to be a dormant volcano. Potential hazards from future eruptions at Ampato are lahars induced by melting of the icecap and sub-Plinian eruptions, considering the history of explosive eruptions at this volcano. The area of Ampato is also within the danger zone of Sabancaya, which could induce mudflows in the valleys draining Ampato and Hualca Hualca. Infrastructure in the area south of Ampato includes irrigation canals and the Mantaro-Socabaya power line.

The Peruvian geological service has published a hazard map that describes danger areas of both Ampato and Sabancaya. Hazards mapped include both the fall of ash and the formation of lahars which can advance to distances of 20 kilometres (12 mi) in the southerly valleys of Ampato. Pyroclastic fallout primarily threatens the vicinity of the volcano but large eruptions can result in fallout over large areas around the volcanic complex. Several different hazard scenarios have been elaborated for the volcanoes, ranging from small Vulcanian eruptions to large Plinian eruptions and giant landslides resulting from sector collapse. Seismic stations observe the volcanoes, and the eastern slopes of Ampato host numerous technical devices used to monitor the activity of Sabancaya.

== Religious importance and human sacrifice ==
The Inkas of the Inka empire's Condesuyos province regarded Ampato as one of their most important deities. They used to offer golden and silver objects to Ampato and other high mountains as religious offerings. Anecdotally, the giving of such offerings continued into recent times: In 1999 villagers in the Colca Valley made offerings to Ampato and other mountain gods to secure water and crops, and in 1993 climbers on the mountain burned material goods like coca leaves and unborn animals as an invocation on Ampato. The name Ampato, meaning "frog" or "toad", is linked to local folklore, and (in the wider Andes) to the mountains being sources of water; Ampato was considered such by the community of Cabanaconde. The visibility of Ampato from the Siguas Valley might have had religious or cultural importance there.

Around 1466 the Inka offered the Mummy Juanita as a human sacrifice on the mountain, along with two other girls and a boy. The sacrifice took place on a platform on the summit of the volcano and was presumably intended to calm the mountain spirits during an eruption of the neighbouring volcano Sabancaya, or to ameliorate a prolonged drought. The mummies were discovered in 1995 by Johan Reinhard and colleagues on the summit of the mountain when either a warmer, sunnier cliamte or ashfall from Sabancaya caused the ice on Ampato to melt. The mummies are presently in the Andean Sanctuaries Museum. The discovery of the Ampato mummies drew global attention to this practice, which in the Andes is known as capacocha. The sacrifices were mostly children, and the process served to tie the Inka empire more closely together, since children to be sacrificed were selected from the entire realm and the children adorned and their names remembered after the sacrifice.

== See also ==
- Ananta
