= Sabancaya =

Active stratovolcano in Southern Peru

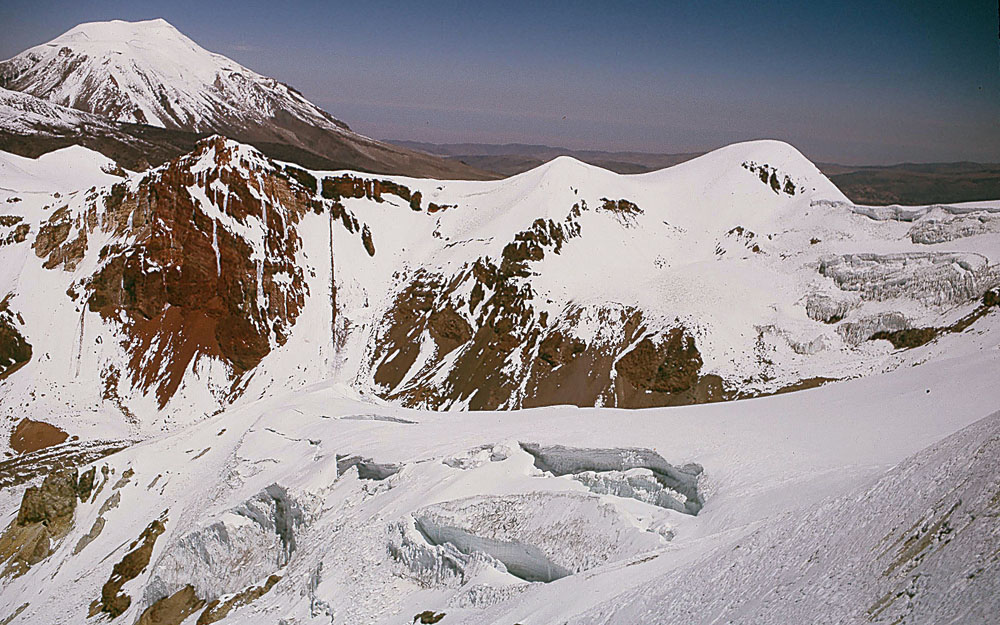
- Aerial view of Sabancaya, the summit in the left background is Ampato

Highest point
- Elevation: 5,960 m (19,550 ft)
- Prominence: ~500 m (1,640 ft)
- Coordinates: 15°47′12″S 71°51′27″W

Geography
- Location within Peru
- Location: Southern Peru
- Parent range: Andes

Geology
- Mountain type: Stratovolcano
- Volcanic zone: Central Volcanic Zone
- Last eruption: Ongoing since November 2016

Climbing
- First ascent: 1966

Sabancaya is an active stratovolcano in the Andes of southern Peru, about 70 kilometres (43 mi) northwest of Arequipa. It is considered part of the Central Volcanic Zone of the Andes, one of the three distinct volcanic belts of the Andes. The Central Volcanic Zone includes a number of volcanoes, some of which, like Huaynaputina, have had large eruptions, and others, such as Sabancaya and Ubinas, have been active in historical time. Sabancaya forms a volcanic complex together with Hualca Hualca to the north and Ampato to the south and has erupted andesite and dacite. It is covered by a small ice cap, which leads to a risk of lahars during eruptions.

Sabancaya has generated numerous long lava flows, especially during the early Holocene, while activity in the later Holocene has been more explosive. Historical reports indicate eruptions during the 18th century. The volcano returned to activity in 1986, culminating in a large eruption in 1990. Since then, it has been continuously active with the emission of ash and gas.

== Name origin and first ascent ==
The name "Sabancaya" is Quechua and means tongue of fire or spitting volcano, likely a reference to the eruptive activity. Another version is Sahuancqueya. The name is attested from 1595, implying that volcanic activity was observed since that date. The summit was first ascended in 1966, with the first ascent of all three summits in 1972.

== Geography and geomorphology ==
Sabancaya lies about 80 km (50 mi) northwest of Arequipa and 30 km (19 mi) southwest of Chivay, in the Caylloma Province of the Arequipa Department. The Rio Colca valley is located north of the Sabancaya-Hualca Hualca-Ampato volcano complex. The main economic activities in the area are agriculture, animal husbandry and tourism. Access to the volcano is through the Chivay-Arequipa road, from which a dirt road departs at Patapampa that leads to the volcano. Two other routes pass Achoma and Hornillos, and via Huambo.

=== Regional ===
The subduction of the Nazca Plate beneath the South American Plate in the Peru-Chile Trench leads to volcanic activity in the Andes. This volcanic activity presently occurs in three segments, the Northern Volcanic Zone, the Central Volcanic Zone and the Southern Volcanic Zone. There is an additional volcanic belt south of the Southern Volcanic Zone, the Austral Volcanic Zone, associated with the subduction of the Antarctic Plate. Sabancaya is located in the Central Volcanic Zone of the Andes, which extends through southern Peru. Many volcanoes in the Central Volcanic Zone are poorly known, owing to their remote locations and adverse conditions such as high altitude.

Sabancaya is part of a series of volcanoes that line the southwestern coast of Peru at a distance of roughly 100 kilometres (62 mi) from the shore. Of these volcanoes, Andagua volcanic field, Sabancaya, El Misti, Ubinas, Huaynaputina, Ticsani, Tutupaca and Yucamane have been active during historical time, erupting forty-five times during the past six centuries. Further volcanoes in the area with Pliocene-Quaternary activity are Sara Sara, Auquihuato, Solimana, Coropuna, Huambo volcanic field, Quimsachata, Chachani, Purupuruni, Casiri and Tacora. All these volcanoes are considered part of the Central Volcanic Zone of the Andes, and lie c. 150–200 kilometres (93–124 mi) east of the Peru-Chile Trench. Notable among them are Ampato and Coropuna for exceeding a height of 6,000 metres (20,000 ft), Huaynaputina and El Misti for their large eruptions, and Ubinas and Sabancaya for their recent activity.

These volcanoes are found in places where strike-slip faults, which delimit the volcanic arc and strike along its length, intersect additional faults formed by extensional tectonics. Such faults, mainly normal faults, occur around Sabancaya as well and include the Huambo-Cabanaconde, the Huanca, the Ichupampa, the Pampa Sepina, Sepina, Solarpampa and Trigal faults; the volcanoes Ampato and Sabancaya are aligned on the Sepina fault, which may thus be responsible for their existence. These fault systems are still active and experience occasional earthquakes and deformation, and their activity appears to be in part triggered by underground magma movements at Sabancaya. Large fractures opened up in the ground during the 1990s eruptions. Geological scale fractures in the crust formed by pulling-apart motion may be the ultimate source of volcanism at Sabancaya.

=== Local ===
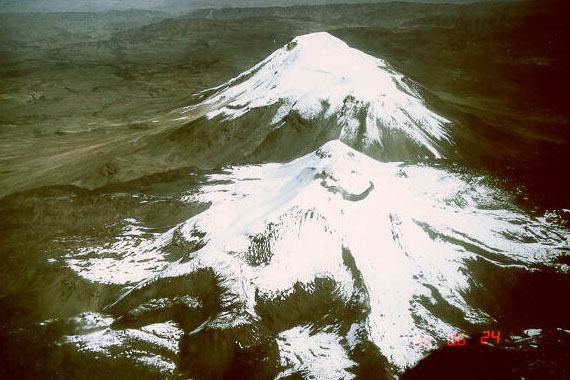
Sabancaya, with Ampato in the background

Sabancaya is 5,960 metres (19,554 ft), 5,976 metres (19,606 ft) or 5,980 metres (19,619 ft) high and rises 1,500 metres (4,920 ft) above the surrounding terrain. It forms a group of volcanoes with the northern Hualca Hualca and the southern Ampato in the Cordillera Occidental, which tower above the Colca Canyon in the north and the Siguas Valley in the southwest. Ampato and the more heavily eroded Hualca Hualca are the dominant volcanoes of this group, with Sabancaya forming a northeastward extension of the former 4–5 kilometres (2.5–3.1 mi) away from Ampato's summit. There is evidence of age progression from the oldest, Hualca Hualca, over Ampato, to the youngest volcano, Sabancaya. Laguna Mucurca and the Huambo volcanic field are on the western side of Sabancaya.

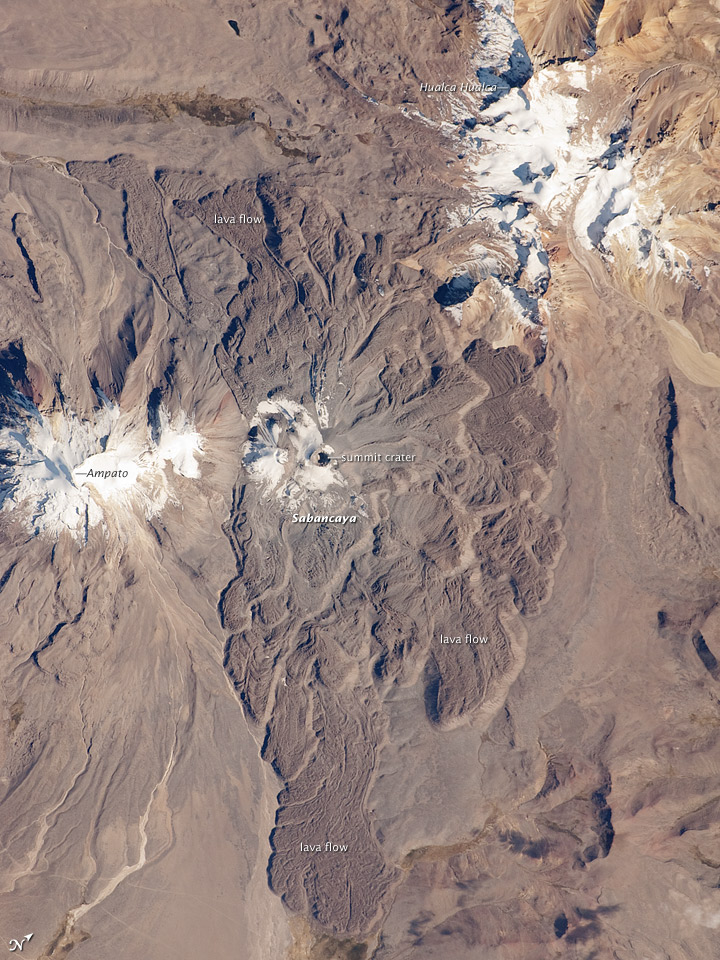
Sabancaya from space. The lava flows are clearly visible.

Sabancaya consists of two separate centres that are formed by neighbouring domes, Sabancaya I North/Sabancaya-1 and Sabancaya II South/Sabancaya-2. The 350 metres (1,150 ft) wide summit crater at the top of the volcano lies, depending on the source, either on the northern dome or between these two domes, with traces of an additional crater just northeast. A lava dome-flow complex forms the southern summit. Despite the presence of an ice cap, lava flows are recognizable in the summit area. Ongoing activity causes changes in the appearance of the summit region; for example, the 1990 eruption widened the crater and produced large fractures. The volcano has a volume of about 6–7 cubic kilometres (1.4–1.7 cu mi). The upper slopes of the volcano are steep, and become gentler at its foot. A parasitic vent 3.5 kilometres (2.2 mi) east of the summit has been the source of lava flows, and a small dome lies at the same distance northwest from the summit.

A set of over 42 Holocene lava flows emanate from the volcano, and cover a surface area of about 68 square kilometres (26 sq mi), with individual lava flows extending up to 8 km (5.0 mi) east and west from between its two neighbours. The lava flows at larger distances are older than the ones close to the vent. These flows are blocky, have lobe structures and reach thicknesses of 60–170 metres (200–560 ft); the total thickness of this pile of lava flows is about 300–400 metres (980–1,310 ft). Their diverse structures have been studied. Mudflow deposits have been found around Ampato and Sabancaya. Pyroclastic flow deposits are also found, but they might originate from Ampato rather than Sabancaya.

Sabancaya, like its two neighbours, is covered by an ice cap which in 1988 extended to distances of 2.5–3 kilometres (1.6–1.9 mi) from the summit. In 1997, a surface area of 3.4 square kilometres (1.3 sq mi) was reported. The maximum thickness was 50 metres (160 ft) in the summit area, decreasing to 20 metres (66 ft) on steeper slopes. Penitents rise from the ice in some places. In 1998, the snowline was at 5,600 metres (18,400 ft) altitude, varying from 5,525 metres (18,127 ft) to the northwest to 5,850 metres (19,190 ft) to the northeast. It lies above the freezing level height, as the climate is dry and impedes glacier development. Between 1986 and 2016 the mountain lost over three quarters of its ice cap, and the remaining ice field broke up into several ice bodies. Moraines at elevations of 4,450–4,250 metres (14,600–13,940 ft) above sea level testify to the occurrence of more extensive glaciation during the last ice age between 25,000 and 17,000 years before present, when ice covered an area of 347 square kilometres (134 sq mi) on the three volcanoes; these moraines have diverted some lava flows. In turn, younger lava flows were emplaced on glacial valleys. Younger moraines are found at higher altitudes, 4,400–4,650 metres (14,440–15,260 ft) above sea level, and may have formed between 13,000 and 10,000 years ago, shortly after the beginning of the Holocene. Most of Sabancaya post-dates the last ice age and is thus relatively unaffected by glaciation.

The magma chamber of Sabancaya is located beneath Hualca Hualca and Pampa Sepina northeast of Sabancaya about 10 kilometres (6.2 mi) away from the summit. Between 1992 and 1996, this area inflated at a depth of 11–13 km (6.8–8.1 mi) below sea level, indicating that the magma supply system of Sabancaya may not be centered directly below the volcano. A phase of ground uplift at Hualca Hualca volcano and earthquake swarms in 1990 and later seismic activity under Hualca Hualca indicate that the magma chamber of Sabancaya is actually under the neighbouring volcano, a not uncommon phenomenon at volcanoes. Uplift was also observed between 2013 and 2019. Electrical techniques like magnetotelluric analysis and spontaneous potential analysis have found a potential hydrothermal system under Sabancaya and traces of an old caldera. Deeper below the volcano, low seismic velocity anomalies in the crust may be associated with volcanism at Sabancaya.

== Geology ==
The tectonic conditions in the region have not been constant over time; at various times the plates approached each other at higher speed, and this led to a compressional tectonic regimen. In the Western Cordillera however, tensional faulting facilitated the occurrence of voluminous volcanism. This faulting is still underway and produces earthquakes in the area.

The basement of the volcano is formed by Precambrian rocks of the "Arequipa Massif", which are up to 1.9 billion years old. They are overlaid by various sediments and volcanic formations (Yura Group and Tiabaya unit) of Mesozoic and Cenozoic age. Especially during the Neogene, the supply of volcanic material was high and dominated the region, forming a volcanic "foot"; the present volcanoes are constructed on this volcanic "foot" formed by the Tacaza and Barroso sequences. This "foot" is made out of an ignimbrite plateau that drops down south. The "foot" beneath Ampato, Hualca Hualca and Sabancaya has been dated 2.2 ±0.15 million years ago, while a lava flow beneath the first and the last of these is about 0.8 ±0.04 million years old. Sometimes the volcanoes are classified within the Barroso sequence.

=== Composition ===
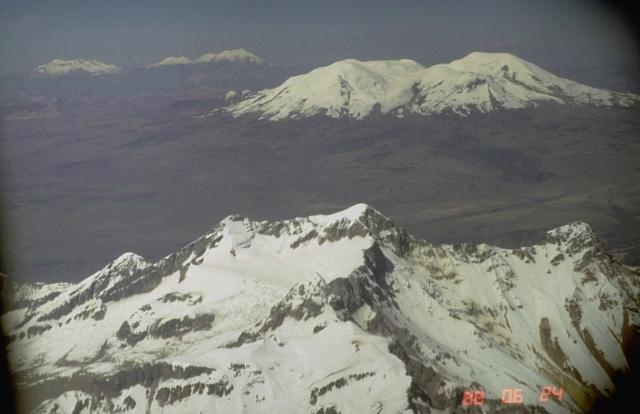
Aerial photo of Solimana (foreground), Coropuna (upper right) and Sabancaya (upper left)

Fresh volcanites of Sabancaya consist of porphyritic andesite and dacite, with andesite about twice as common as dacite. They form a potassium-rich calc-alkaline suite similar to other volcanoes in southern Peru; the andesites occasionally appear as fine-grained enclaves. The rocks are not very vesicular and contain a moderate amount of phenocrysts. Minerals encountered in both phenocrysts and groundmass are amphibole, biotite, hornblende, iron oxide, plagioclase, pyroxene and titanium oxide; degraded olivine is also found. The rocks erupted by Sabancaya, Ampato and Hualca Hualca have similar compositions.

The magmas formed at temperatures of 920–990 °C (1,688–1,814 °F) with uncertainties of 30–50 °C (54–90 °F); the highest temperatures are associated with the 1992 eruption products. Fluids from the downgoing slab chemically alter (metasomatism) the overlying mantle, which eventually melts to produce a primitive magma. In various magma chambers, magma genesis involved processes of magma mixing which formed at least part of the andesites and fractional crystallization which gave rise to the dacites. Partial crystallization and flow events within the magma chamber caused the formation of the andesite enclaves. The total magma production rate of Sabancaya without accounting for repose periods is about 0.6–1.7 cubic kilometres per year (0.14–0.41 mi^{3}/a) and is stored in a magma chamber under Hualca Hualca, 7 kilometres (4.3 mi) horizontal distance from Sabancaya, at 13 kilometres (8.1 mi) depth.

Sabancaya is a source of volcanic gases such as SO_{2} and H_{2}O. The amount of water emitted by Sabancaya is noticeably large for a volcano (about 250,000 tonnes per day or 2.9 tonnes per second); the source of this water might be an evaporating hydrothermal system in the volcano. Together with Ubinas Sabancaya is among the main emitters of CO_{2}, SO_{2} and H_{2}O in the Central Volcanic Zone of the Andes and among the top fifteen volcanic emitters on Earth. Sulfur dioxide is transported by winds on to the Pacific Ocean, where it affects the low stratocumulus clouds, but also to Arequipa where it contributes to air pollution. Much of the gas is derived from magma that does not ascend to the surface. The volcano also produces aerosols. The various emissions of Sabancaya have been recorded at research stations (Chacaltaya research station in Bolivia) and ice cores (Coropuna and possibly Quelccaya in Peru).

== Eruptive history ==
Hualca Hualca formed first among the three volcanoes. Later activity shifted to Ampato and finally to Sabancaya, after a period where both Ampato and Sabancaya were active. Holocene activity at Sabancaya has been subdivided into two or three stages, Sabancaya I, Sabancaya II and Sabancaya III in the three-stage model and a principal cone-basal lava flow fields in the two-stage model; there is also an eight-stage model for the overall growth of the volcano.

Sabancaya is the youngest volcano of Peru. Dating efforts have yielded ages of 12,340 ±550, 6,650 ±320, 6,300 ±310, 5,440 ±40, 5,200 ±100 and 4,100 ±100 years before present on various lava flows of the basal lava flow field stage, indicating that effusive activity started shortly after the beginning of the Holocene and built the basal edifice. Pyroclastic eruptions are less common and have a low volume. Layers dated 8,500 years before present, 2500-2100 BC, 420–150 BC, 100 BC – 150 AD and between 1200 and 1400 AD, could have originated either on Sabancaya or Ampato. There is evidence that early and middle-Holocene Sabancaya mostly erupted lava, while the late-Holocene volcano was more explosive in its activity. Some lava flows might have remained hot for millennia after emplacement. Thirteen tephra-producing eruptions took place between 4,150 ±40 and 730 ±35 years ago. It is possible that the Inca performed human sacrifices in response to eruptions of Sabancaya to calm down the mountain spirits; the Mummy Juanita on Ampato may have been such a sacrifice, or one against a drought.

=== Historical activity ===
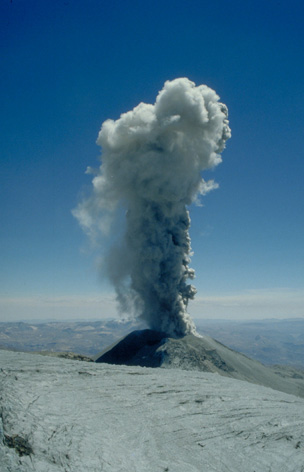
The 1994 eruption of Sabancaya

Sabancaya is the most active or second most active volcano in Peru. A sulfate aerosol spike in 1695 has been attributed to Sabancaya. Spanish chronicles mention probable eruptions in 1752 and 1784, which might have left layers of tephra. After the 18th century, the volcano went dormant for about two hundred years during which only fumarolic activity was recorded, and the volcano was sometimes omitted from listings of active volcanoes. Beginning in 1981, signs of increased activity were noted. In late 1986 an increased fumarolic activity heralded the onset of a new eruptive period, and satellite images observed the occurrence of black spots where the ice had melted or boiled away. This period reached a climax in May 1990, when an eruption with a volcanic explosivity index of 2–3 occurred. This eruption threw ash to distances of 12 kilometres (7.5 mi) from the summit and was accompanied by strong earthquake activity and the formation of eruption columns that reached heights of 7 km (4.3 mi). The eruption and further activity, through 1990, enlarged the summit crater and caused the formation of new rows of fumaroles. Chemical analysis of the volcanic rocks suggests that this phase of volcanic activity was started by the injection of mafic magma into the magma chamber.

Ash fell on towns around the volcano, causing irritations at the eyes, throats and intestines, and buried pastures. This eruption displaced between 4,000 and 1,500 people in the region, and there was widespread concern about the volcano, livestock losses, and complaints about government inaction. The US Volcano Disaster Assistance Program provided assistance. Ash fall from the eruption melted ice on the neighbouring Hualca Hualca, producing mudflows, and may have caused unusual rainfall during the dry season.

After the large 1990 eruption, the style of activity at Sabancaya changed towards a frequent occurrence of explosive eruptions with however low output, which threw ballistic blocks to distances of about 1 kilometre (0.62 mi) from the summit crater and frequently produce plumes; this pattern of activity is referred to as "Vulcanian eruptions" and was accompanied by a decrease of the magma supply. Ash fall from these eruptions induced melting of the glaciers on Ampato volcano, exposing Inca artefacts including the Mummy Juanita. These explosive eruptions became less common over time (from paroxysms every 20–30 minutes to only 5–6 eruptions per day) and the proportional amount of fresh volcanic material increased at first; since 1997 discontinuous eruptions generate steam columns no higher than 300–500 metres (980–1,640 ft) and ejected material is almost entirely lithic. Satellite imagery has evidenced the occurrence of temperature anomalies on Sabancaya on the scale of 13 K (23 °F), probably owing to fumarolic activity.

In March and April 2013, fumarolic activity and the occurrence of seismic swarms increased after fifteen years of rest, leading to local infrastructure being damaged; an eruption occurred in August 2014 and blue and yellow gases were emitted between 2013 and 2015. This pulse of activity was accompanied by an increased release of SO_{2}, which was being emitted at a rate of 1,000 tonnes per day (0.012 t/s) in 2014. Ash was emitted by the volcano multiple times through 2014 and 2015, and there has been steady shallow seismic activity since 2013. The remote location of the volcano means that direct impacts on towns is rare, and as of 2014 no human casualties are known.

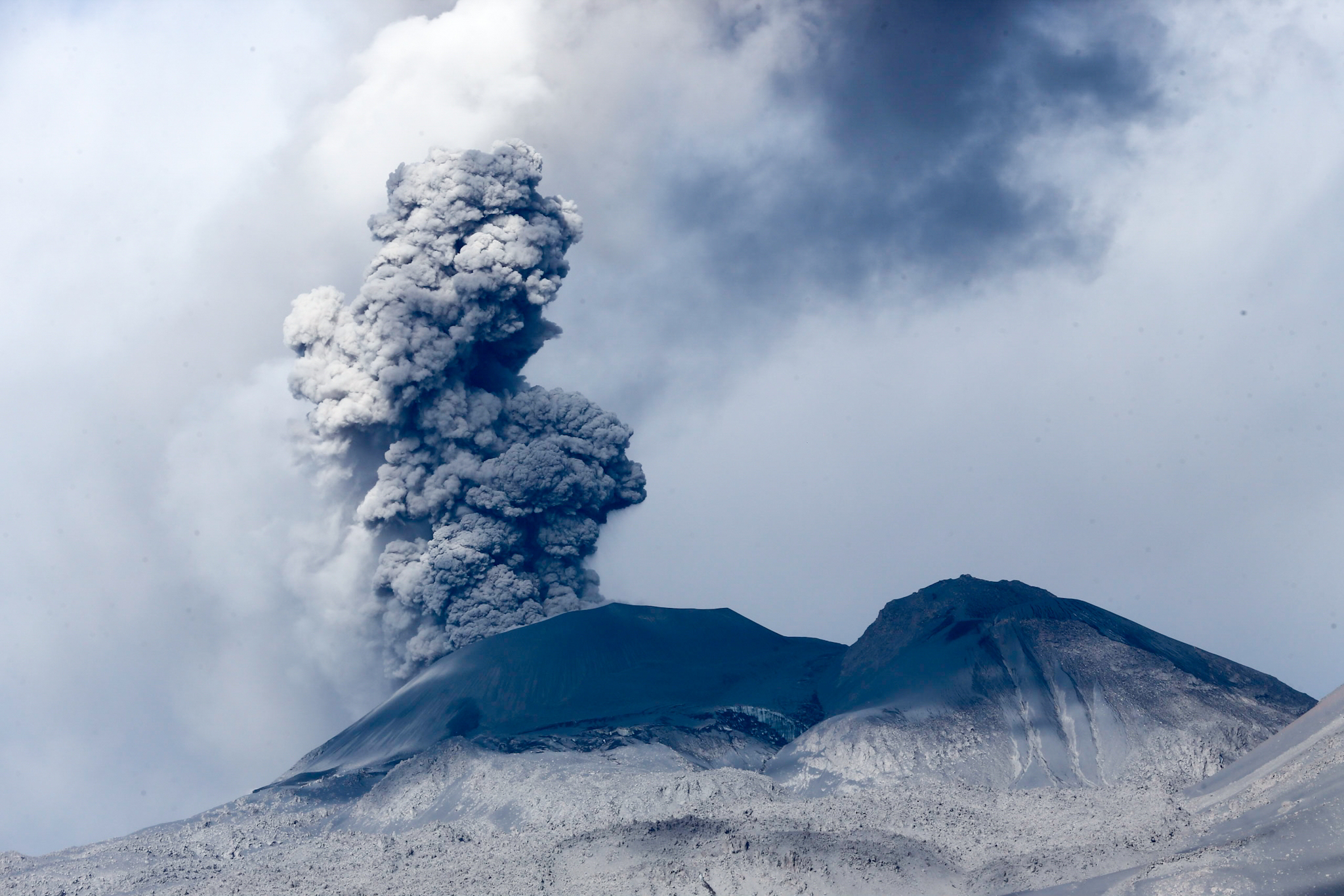
Sabancaya erupting, September 2017

A further increase of fumarolic activity was observed in 2016, when new fumaroles appeared and sulfur flux increased to 6,000 tonnes per day (0.069 t/s) sulfur dioxide. Ash eruptions have occurred since 6 November 2016, with an eruption column 3 km (1.9 mi) high five days later. Since then, the volcano has been continuously active with numerous explosions every day, which produce volcanic ash clouds that can rise to elevations of 3.5 km (2.2 mi). A persistent gas plume lies above the volcano and repeated emissions of ash have happened, resulting in several alerts for the local population. Lahars have been produced in some occasions, without reports of damage. A lava dome began to grow in 2017 within the crater, with unsteady explosive activity and occasional seismic swarms, and was progressively destroyed in 2020. In 2020, a second lava dome formed in November but it was destroyed between December and February of that year. These lava domes were named after numbers in Quechua: Huk for the first and Iskay for the second. The domes Kimsa formed in 2021 and was destroyed in the same year, while Tawa existed during the winter of 2021-2022. In March and May 2023, Pichqa formed and was destroyed during the later course of the year. Ash emissions and seismic activity associated with the eruption begun in 2016 is ongoing as of September 2025.

=== Seismicity ===
Seismic monitoring of the volcano began in 1990, when the Geophysical Institute of Peru installed several permanent seismic stations. Several of them were impacted by ashfalls and thus did not record data through that period of activity.

Several types of seismic activity occur at volcanoes, and examples of the various types have been found at Sabancaya:

- "Type A" seismic signals, which are shallow (1–10 kilometres (0.62–6.21 mi) deep) earthquakes produced by the fracturing of rock caused by magma or fluid movements. They are high frequency P and S waves
- "Type B" seismic signals, which are formed at depths of less than 1 kilometre (0.62 mi) as P and S waves but are otherwise similar to "Type A" signals. They too are formed by the fracturing of rock within the volcano.
- Explosive seismicity is produced by volcanic explosions, and its properties vary strongly with the nature and traits of the explosion.
- Long-period earthquakes are produced by resonant movements of fluids inside the volcano (such seismicity produced by resonant movements is also known as "tornillos"). At Sabancaya, they frequently precede steam and vapour emissions.
- Tremors are produced by numerous volcanic processes and occur during most volcanic eruptions. Causes are vibrations caused by eruptive activity and weak earthquakes. At Sabancaya they occur in various forms, including harmonic, monochromatic and spasmodic.

Seismic activity during the 2020s, 2010s and 1990s eruption period concentrated not under the volcano, but under Hualca Hualca north and Pampa Sepina northeast of the volcano. A strong earthquake in 1991, which caused a landslide that destroyed the village of Maca, might be linked to Sabancaya.

=== Hazards ===
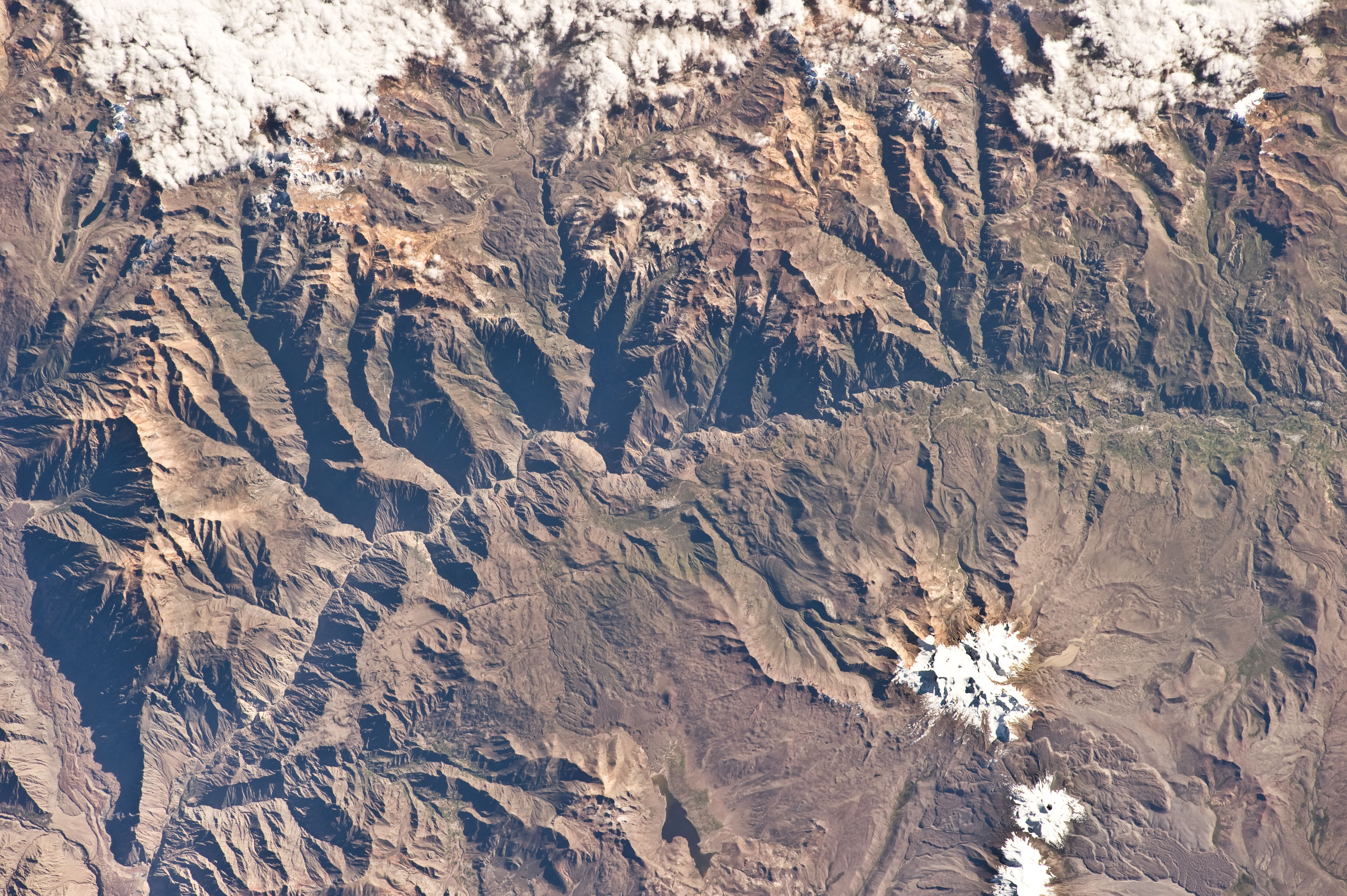
The Colca canyon; Sabancaya is the white dot just above the right bottom of the image

Sabancaya rises above the valleys of the Colca river and of some tributaries of the Siguas river with about 35,000 people living in them. Sabancaya is particularly dangerous for the Colca river valley, 18 kilometres (11 mi) north of the volcano; with the towns Achoma, Cabanaconde, Chivay, Ichupampa, Lari, Maca, Madrigal, Pinchollo, Yanque and others lie in the valley; other cities potentially endangered by Sabancaya include Camaná on the Pacific Ocean. About 30,000 people live within 30 kilometres (19 mi) from the volcano. On the slopes of the volcano are the Majes-Siguas canal system and the major power line that delivers electricity from the Mantaro Power Plant; all of these could be threatened in an eruption. In the case of a major Plinian eruption, at least 60,000 to 70,000 people would be threatened. Rock fall would affect the area close to the summit domes, as would pyroclastic flows; these would be a further hazard to the valleys draining the volcano. Gigantic landslides from partial collapses of the volcanic cones are considered a low-probability hazard.

The presence of an ice cap is an additional source of danger, as its melting during a volcanic eruption could form hazardous lahars, although the small volume of the ice cap limits their damage potential. The ice caps on Ampato and Hualca Hualca could also melt, increasing the hazard. The Majes River and Sihuasi River drainages would be threatened by such mudflows in case of an eruption; the former is the site of the Majes-Siguas irrigation project, the most important in southern Peru. Other dangers from eruptions at Sabancaya are tephra fallout, which can impact the health of people, animals and plants more than 50 kilometres (31 mi) away; and lava flows, which however are not much of a threat to humans owing to their slow speed. Aside from the direct threat of eruptions, Sabancaya also contributes to SO_{2} air pollution in the Colca valley, which can damage plants and cause respiratory distress in animals and humans. Ash clouds from Sabancaya frequently impede air travel over the region; the volcano is one of the most frequent causes of volcanic ash-related air traffic advisories in the world. Wind can blow ash back in the air, thus producing ash falls even when the volcano is not erupting.

=== Monitoring ===
Sabancaya and Ubinas were the first Peruvian volcanoes to be studied scientifically. Volcano monitoring in Peru commenced after the 1986 eruption, with the Southern Volcano Observatory being created two years later and beginning its work at Sabancaya. The monitoring network around the volcano was expanded after its 2013 eruption. The Southern Volcano Observatory and the Peruvian Volcanological Observatory monitor Sabancaya with ash measuring equipment, gas measuring equipment, GPS, infrasound detectors, seismometers, surveillance cameras, and telemetry units. The SVO also uses data from satellites and volcanic ash collectors. These data are published both in real-time online and in volcano activity bulletins.

==== Hazard maps and scenarios ====
INGEMMET has published three volcano hazard maps, which show where there are hazards from volcanic ash, mudflows and "multiple threats", respectively. According to the "multiple threats" map, the danger from lava flows, mudflows, pyroclastic flows and volcanic bombs is highest on the edifice itself and the valleys draining Ampato-Sabancaya to the east, south and west. A moderate hazard is found on Ampato-Sabancaya and downstream valleys, and a low hazard around the foot of Ampato-Sabancaya. Only a few houses are located within "multiple threats" hazard zones as of 2017, but several bridges, canals, roads and the towns of Taya, Lluta and Huanca are within the mudflow hazard zone, and the volcanic ash hazard zone includes numerous villages.

Together with Ubinas, Coropuna and Misti, Sabancaya is classified by as a "very high risk" volcano; in the case of Sabancaya because of its threat to the Majes-Siguas irrigation project. Scenarios of future eruptions range from vulcanian eruptions over effusive eruptions (no evidence of effusive eruptions during the past few centuries) and vulcanian-subplinian eruptions to the low-probability scenario of Plinian eruptions. Scenarios of mudflow emission range from mudflows in the valleys draining Ampato and Sabancaya over to flows that extend 25 kilometres (16 mi) from the volcano into surrounding towns.

== Climate and vegetation ==
Temperatures decrease with elevation. At 2,800–4,000 metres (9,200–13,100 ft) altitude they can exceed 15 °C (59 °F) during daytime and drop below −6 °C (21 °F) during the night. Especially between 4,000–4,800 metres (13,100–15,700 ft) elevation ("Puna"), frosts are common and higher temperatures rare. Above 4,000 metres (13,000 ft) elevation, temperatures only barely rise above freezing, and are year-round below freezing at altitudes exceeding 5,400 metres (17,700 ft). In southern Peru, the wet season is during December–March, with the rest of the year dry. Annual precipitation east of the volcano is about 480–926 millimetres (18.9–36.5 in); on average, about 2 metres (6 ft 7 in) ice and snow accumulate on Sabancaya during the wet season. Water from the volcano drains south into the Quilca-Chili system and to the north into the Colca river system.

The landscape around Sabancaya, Ampato and Hualca Hualca is largely unvegetated and resembles a desert. The vegetation forms distinct belts at different altitudes and includes bushes, cacti, Festuca and Stipa (ichu) genera, tolar and yareta. Wetlands called bofedales developed in river valleys around Sabancaya. The volcano has covered its immediate surroundings with volcanic ash. Animal life includes camelids, cattle and sheep.

== Access and human use ==
Several paved roads pass along the foot of Ampato and Hualca Hualca, including the department-level road PE-34E and the AR-579. The principal economic activities in the area are agriculture, animal husbandry, mining and tourism. The lava flows of Sabancaya have been used as an Earth analogue for lava flows on other planets, to determine how they would appear in space images and infer their properties like composition. The inhabitants of the Colca Valley view Sabancaya as an apu, a mountain deity.

The valley is one of the principal tourism destinations of Peru, with about 190,000 visitors per year. It and Sabancaya have been evaluated for their potential as geotourism targets, the UNESCO Colca y Volcanes de Andagua geopark includes Sabancaya. In 1995, the potential of geothermal power generation and volcano tourism at an active volcano was noted. Volcanic activity is visible from the Chivay-Arequipa road at Patapampa, other viewpoints are at Mucurca northwest and Coporaque northeast of the volcano.

== See also ==
- List of volcanoes in Peru
- Lake Mucurca
