= Summits farthest from the Earth's center =

Although Mount Everest is the point with the highest elevation above sea level on the Earth, it is not the summit that is farthest from the Earth's center. Because of the equatorial bulge, the summit of Mount Chimborazo in the Andes is the point on the Earth that is farthest from the center, and is 2,168 m (7,113 ft) farther from the Earth's center than the summit of Everest. The second-farthest summit, Huascarán, also in the Andes, is only about 10 metres closer to the Earth's center.

== Background ==
Planet Earth is not a perfect sphere, but has an oblate spheroid shape, because the planet's rotation gives the planet an equatorial bulge. As a result, mean sea level at the poles is 6,356.8 kilometres (3,949.9 mi) from the center of the Earth, while mean sea level at the equator is 6,378.1 kilometres (3,963.2 mi) from the center of the Earth. This means sea level at the equator is about 22 kilometres (14 mi) further away from the centre of the Earth than sea level is at the poles is. Because Mount Chimborazo is quite close to the equator, its summit is about 2.1 kilometres (1.3 mi) further from the centre of the earth than the summit of Mount Everest is. At least 26 other mountain summits are also further from the center of the Earth than Mount Everest due to Earth's equatorial bulge.

== List of summits ==
Position	Type	Summit	Distance from Earth's center	Elevation above sea level m	Latitude	Country
1	Dormant Volcano	Chimborazo	6,384.4 kilometres or 3,967.1 miles	6,267 metres (20,561 ft)	1°28′09″S	Ecuador
2	Mountain	Huascarán (Sur Summit)	6,384.4 kilometres or 3,967.1 miles	6,768 metres (22,205 ft)	9°07′17″S	Peru
3	Mountain	Yerupajá	6,384.3 kilometres or 3,967.0 miles	6,655 metres (21,834 ft)	10°16′01″S	Peru
4	Active Volcano	Cotopaxi	6,384.1 kilometres or 3,966.9 miles	5,897 metres (19,347 ft)	0°40′50″S	Ecuador
5	Mountain	Huandoy	6,384.0 kilometres or 3,966.8 miles	6,395 metres (20,981 ft)	9°01′38″S	Peru
6	Dormant Volcano	Kilimanjaro (Kibo Summit)	6,384.0 kilometres or 3,966.8 miles	5,895 metres (19,341 ft)	3°04′33″S	Tanzania
7	Active Volcano	Cayambe	6,384.0 kilometres or 3,966.8 miles	5,790 metres (19,000 ft)	0°01′30″N	Ecuador
8	Volcano	Antisana	6,383.9 kilometres or 3,966.8 miles	5,753 metres (18,875 ft)	0°28′53″N	Ecuador
9	Mountain	Siula Grande	6,383.8 kilometres or 3,966.7 miles	5,790 metres (19,000 ft)	10°17′S	Peru
10	Mountain	Alpamayo	6,383.6 kilometres or 3,966.6 miles	5,947 metres (19,511 ft)	8°52′47″S	Peru
11	Mountain	Pisco (Western summit) (Nevado Pisco)	6,383.4 kilometres or 3,966.5 miles	5,752 metres (18,871 ft)	9°00′43″S	Peru
12	Extinct Volcano	Mount Kenya	6,383.336 kilometres or 3,966.421 miles	5,199 metres (17,057 ft)	0°09′03″S	Kenya
13	Mountain	Salcantay	6,383.3 kilometres or 3,966.4 miles	6,271 metres (20,574 ft)	13°20′01″S	Peru
14	Mountain	Pico Simón Bolívar	6,383.2 kilometres or 3,966.3 miles	5,720 metres (18,770 ft)	10°50′05″S	Colombia
14	Mountain	Pico Cristóbal Colón	6,383.2 kilometres or 3,966.3 miles	5,776 metres (18,950 ft)	10°50′18″S	Colombia
15	Volcano	Coropuna	6,383.1 kilometres or 3,966.3 miles	6,425 metres (21,079 ft)	15°33′00″S	Peru
16	Mountain	Ancohuma (Janq'u Uma)	6,383.0 kilometres or 3,966.2 miles	6,427 metres (21,086 ft)	15°51′12″S	Bolivia
17	Mountain	Illampu	6,383.0 kilometres or 3,966.2 miles	6,368 metres (20,892 ft)	15°49′00″S	Bolivia
18	Mountain	Illimani	6,382.9 kilometres or 3,966.2 miles	6,462 metres (21,201 ft)	16°38′00″S	Bolivia
19	Volcano	Ampato	6,382.9 kilometres or 3,966.2 miles	6,288 metres (20,630 ft)	15°49′14″S	Peru
20	Volcano	Rumiñahui	6,382.9 kilometres or 3,966.2 miles	4,721 metres (15,489 ft)	0°34′53″S	Ecuador
21	Volcano	Nevado Sajama	6,382.7 kilometres or 3,966.0 miles	6,542 metres (21,463 ft)	18°06′29″S	Bolivia
22	Mountain	Chachacomani (Chachakumani)	6,382.6 kilometres or 3,966.0 miles	6,074 metres (19,928 ft)	15°59′14″S	Bolivia
23	Extinct volcano	Hualca Hualca (Wallqa Wallqa)	6,382.6 kilometres or 3,966.0 miles	6,025 metres (19,767 ft)	15°43′13″S	Peru
24	Mountain	Huayna Potosí	6,382.6 kilometres or 3,966.0 miles	6,088 metres (19,974 ft)	16°15′45″S	Bolivia
25	Dormant volcano	Chachani	6,382.6 kilometres or 3,966.0 miles	6,057 metres (19,872 ft)	16°11′00″S	Peru
26	Volcano	Parinacota (Parinaquta)	6,382.5 kilometres or 3,965.9 miles	6,348 metres (20,827 ft)	18°09′58″S	Bolivia Chile
27	Volcano	Pomerape	6,382.4 kilometres or 3,965.8 miles	6,282 metres (20,610 ft)	18°07′33″S	Chile Bolivia
28	Volcano	Misti (El Misti)	6,382.3 kilometres or 3,965.8 miles	5,822 metres (19,101 ft)	16°17′47″S	Peru
29		Additional summits omitted by source	For method see source	Only Summits over 5,500 m	See	
30	Mountain	Mount Everest	6,382.3 kilometres or 3,965.8 miles	8,848 metres (29,029 ft)	27°59′17″N	Nepal China
