= Hualca Hualca =

Extinct volcano in Peru

- Gualcagualca
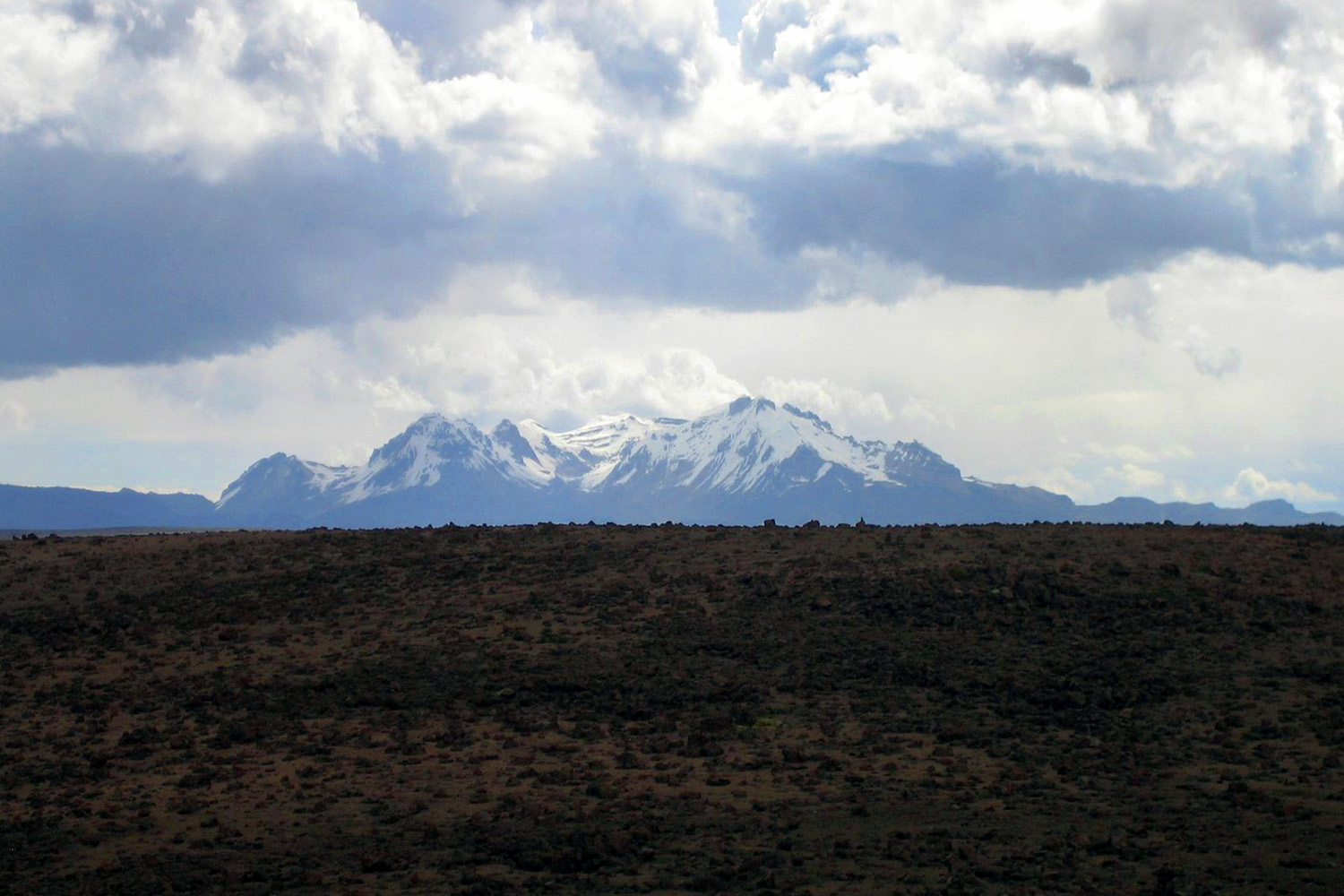
- Hualca Hualca from the east

Highest point
- Elevation: 6,025 m (19,767 ft)
- Parent peak: Ampato
- Coordinates: 15°43′13″S 71°51′38″W

Geography
- Location within Peru
- Location: Arequipa, Peru
- Parent range: Andes, Peruvian Andes

Geology
- Mountain type: Stratovolcano
- Volcanic zone: Central Volcanic Zone
- Last eruption: Unknown

Hualca Hualca (Note: Spanish pronunciation: [ˈwalka ˈwalka]. In Aymara and Quechua, wallqa means "collar".) is a 6,025-metre-high (19,767 ft) extinct volcano in the Andes of southern Peru. It is part of the Peruvian segment of the Central Volcanic Zone, one of several volcanic belts in the Andes. It lies about 70 kilometres (43 mi) northwest of Arequipa and is part of a north–south chain that includes the volcanoes Ampato and Sabancaya, the latter of which has been active historically. The mountain is important to the towns of Cabanaconde and Pinchollo, whose inhabitants viewed it as their source of water and used to carry out religious ceremonies to guarantee continuing water supply.

Hualca Hualca features a wide amphitheatre-like structure on the northern flank, created by a gigantic landslide during the Pleistocene. After the collapse, renewed volcanic activity built a new summit and several lava dome complexes within the collapse scar. After cessation of volcanic activity, glaciers eroded the volcano and formed multiple moraines. The present-day volcano is covered by glaciers, and during the Last Glacial Maximum, glaciers advanced to low altitudes. There are hot springs and geysers north of the mountain, and the magma chambers of Sabancaya are located below Hualca Hualca.

== Geography and geomorphology ==
Hualca Hualca is in the Caylloma Province of southern Peru, 70 kilometres (43 mi) northwest from Arequipa. Directly north of the volcano is the Colca Valley, an important tourism destination and agricultural area which has been settled since before Inca times. The towns of Cabanaconde and Pinchollo lie at the northern foot of Hualca Hualca; other settlements in the area are Madrigal, Lari, Maca, Achoma and Ichupampa. Several roads run around the volcano; one goes to the Hornillo viewpoint on the northeastern flank. Canals and dams collect water flowing from the mountain and convey it to fields at Cabanaconde and west of Sabancaya volcano. Other infrastructure on the mountain consists of homesteads mainly on its western flank and equipment of Peru's volcano monitoring service. Hualca Hualca can be climbed in a few days from Pinchollo by the north side, and is not considered challenging from a mountaineering perspective.

Hualca Hualca is a heavily eroded stratovolcano. A 14-kilometre-wide (8.7 mi) ragged semicircular ridge surrounds a 1,600-metre-deep (5,200 ft) amphitheatre with 700–1,000-metre-high (2,300–3,300 ft) cliffs; the 6,025-metre-high (19,767 ft) summit is on the southeastern part of the ridge. The amphitheatre opens north to the Colca Valley at an elevation of about 3,500 metres (11,500 ft). The scar was formed by a gigantic landslide that removed a volume of about 1.3 cubic kilometres (0.31 cu mi) from the edifice. Within the scar are several volcanic structures consisting of lava domes and lava flows, including 5,310-metre-high (17,420 ft) Nevado de Puye close to the summit, 5,190-metre-high (17,030 ft) Cerro Ahuashune farther west, and a 4,400-metre-high (14,400 ft) volcanic structure with the "Mirador Cruz del Condor" viewpoint to the north. Between Ahuashune and Mirador Cruz del Condor is a lake, and there are cold water springs. Valleys, such as the Huayuray valley due north of the summit and the Hualca-Hualca at the western margin of the amphitheatre, run through the amphitheatre heading north; they are used as irrigation water sources.

The mountain towers above the Colca Valley with irregular slopes. Elsewhere around the perimeter of Hualca Hualca, it and its neighbours rise about 2 kilometres (1.2 mi) above the Altiplano highland. Valleys on its outer slopes include the Mollebaya to the east, Pujro Huayjo to the southwest and Mucurca to the west. Moraines and glacial sediments cover the western slopes of Hualca Hualca, while lava flows of Sabancaya onlap the southern slopes. The edifice is 25 kilometres (16 mi) wide. Surfaces on the volcano are frequently covered by debris and moraine rocks, and Sabancaya has deposited tephra on the land south of Hualca Hualca. At the western foot of Hualca Hualca is Laguna Mucurca.

== Geology ==
Volcanism in South America occurs in four distinct zones along its western coast in the Andes: the Northern Volcanic Zone, the Central Volcanic Zone (CVZ), the Southern Volcanic Zone and the Austral Volcanic Zone. The volcanoes of Peru and the Central Andes belong to the CVZ, which includes more than 50 calderas, composite volcanoes and monogenetic volcanic fields that erupted during the Quaternary. In Peru they include (from north to south) Auquihuato, Sara Sara, Coropuna, Mismi, Hualca Hualca-Sabancaya-Ampato, Chachani, Misti, Ubinas, Huaynaputina, Ticsani, Tutupaca, Yucamane and Casiri. The volcanism of the Central Andes is caused by the northeastward subduction of the Nazca Plate under the South American Plate, at a rate of about 4.6 centimetres per year (1.8 in/year).

Hualca Hualca and its neighbours to the south Sabancaya and Ampato form the Ampato volcanic complex. With an area of about 630 square kilometres (240 sq mi) it is one of the largest volcanic complexes of the Central Andes. Hualca Hualca is the oldest volcano of the complex. Ampato began erupting 450,000 years ago and formed a summit dome 20,000–10,000 years ago. Sabancaya has been active during the Holocene and in historical time, and is the second-most active volcano in Peru.

The rock formations in the area are subdivided into five groups: the Paleozoic intrusive rocks that crop out in the Colca Valley; sedimentary rocks of the Yura Group in the Colca Valley; Oligocene–Miocene volcanic rocks of the Terraza Group, north of the Colca River; Pliocene ignimbrites of the Barroso Group around Hualca Hualca; and the Quaternary sediments of the Colca Group in the collapse scar of the volcano and the Colca Valley. Rocks in the Ampato volcanic complex form the Ampato Group. Some sources regard Hualca Hualca or the entire Ampato volcanic complex as members of the Barroso Group. The rocks underlying the Ampato volcanic complex consist of the Sencca Formation, which is between 1.4 and 4.9 million years old.

Most of the volcano is formed by lava flows, which are stacked more than 1 kilometre (0.62 mi) high. Numerous fault zones cross the northern sector of Hualca Hualca; from north to south these are the Chachas-Cabanaconde-Patapampa Fault System, Solarpampa-Puye Puye-Pillo Fault System and Pungo-Hornillo Fault System. Many show evidence of neotectonic activity, and some have produced earthquakes in recent times or undergone aseismic creep. There are three clusters of shallow seismic activity at Hualca Hualca, where volcano-tectonic processes cause earthquakes. Spontaneous potential analysis has found evidence of two buried structures in the northern part of Hualca Hualca, which might be buried calderas. Magnetotelluric analysis has identified various zones of high and low electrical conductivity under Hualca Hualca.

=== Composition ===
The composition of Hualca Hualca's rocks ranges from andesite-trachyandesite to dacite-trachydacite, and define a potassium-rich calc-alkaline rock suite similar to that of the other volcanoes in the Ampato volcanic complex. Phenocrysts consist of amphibole, biotite, plagioclase and pyroxene. The magmas that built Hualca Hualca formed when the mantle wedge, metasomatised during subduction, melted; the magmas underwent fractional crystallization before erupting at the surface. Minor geochemical differences between the rocks of the three Ampato complex volcanoes may reflect differences in magma generation processes. Hydrothermal manifestations are often accompanied by the deposition of minerals; for example, geysers at Pinchollo have emplaced various sulfate minerals.

== Climate and life ==
Above an elevation of 4,500 metres (14,800 ft), annual temperatures range from 1–6 °C (34–43 °F). There is no temperature data from Hualca Hualca, but data from Chachani implies stable temperatures year-round. Annual precipitation is about 0.8–1 metre (2 ft 7 in – 3 ft 3 in), decreasing at lower elevations. During December–March, the Intertropical Convergence Zone reaches the mountain and draws moisture from the Amazon, as part of the South American Summer Monsoon (Pacific Ocean-derived moisture is trapped beneath a temperature inversion at an elevation of 800 metres (2,600 ft) and cannot reach Hualca Hualca). This is the wet season, during which most of the annual precipitation falls. April to November is the dry season. The mountain is snow-covered year-round. Precipitation on Hualca Hualca may constitute a source of groundwater and recharge the hydrothermal system. El Niño-Southern Oscillation events cause temperatures to increase and precipitation to decrease.

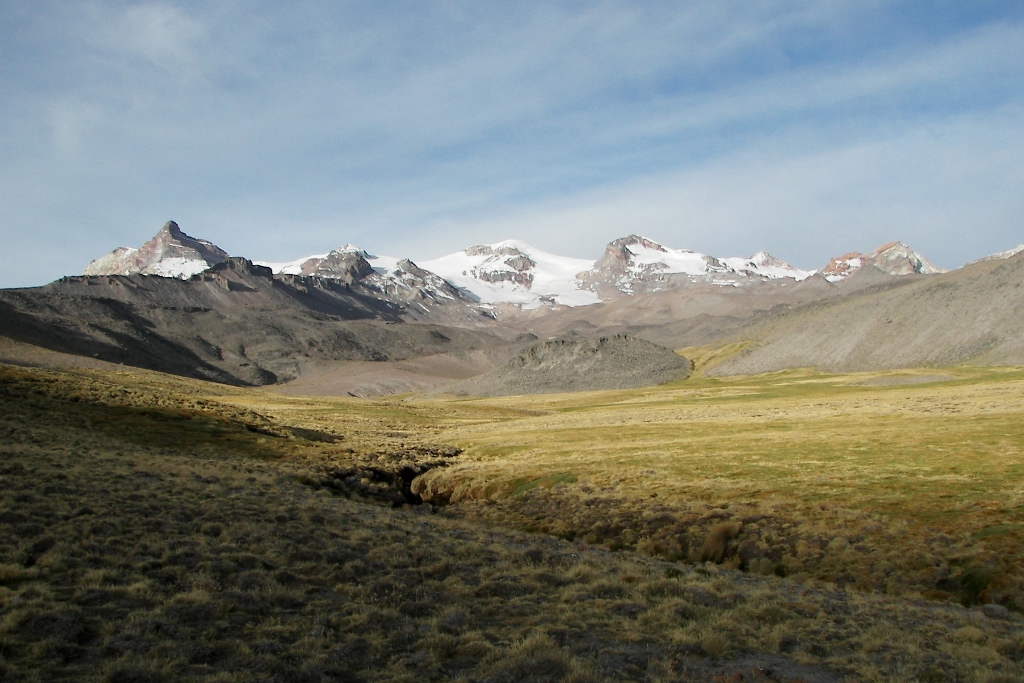
Wetlands south of Hualca Hualca

Below an elevation of 4,500 metres (14,800 ft) there is herbaceous vegetation, dominated by Festuca and Stipa but also featuring cacti, Peruvian feather grass and other pioneer plant species. Above that altitude, cushion plants such as Azorella compacta replace the herbs until 5,000 metres (16,000 ft) elevation, where most vegetation disappears except for lichens and mosses. Peat bogs grow in valleys on the southern side of Hualca Hualca in places where precipitation water and meltwater accumulate. They are classified as "bofedales". Between elevations of 3,800 and 4,500 metres (12,500 and 14,800 ft), the land is used for pasture of alpaca, cattle, llama and sheep. Animals include insects and birds like the Andean condor.

During the Late Pleistocene, temperatures in the Peruvian Andes were up to 8–12 °C (14–22 °F) lower, and episodes of increased precipitation led to the formation of giant lakes in the Altiplano ("Lake Tauca") and (possibly) to the growth of glaciers. In recent decades, temperatures have been increasing at a rate of about 0.1 °C (0.18 °F) per decade. The warming has been blamed for the drying of springs and more irregular meltwater flows.

=== Glaciation ===
Past glaciations have left moraines down to altitudes of 3,650 metres (11,980 ft) around the entire volcano. Moraine tongues form complex and well-preserved structures; they are particularly well-developed on the eastern flank of the volcano and in the Huayuray valley, where they reach lengths of 7 kilometres (4.3 mi) and heights of 120 metres (390 ft). Other glacial landforms are striated/polished surfaces, glacial overdeepenings, glacial valleys, inactive cirques and outwash plains. During the Last Glacial Maximum, the Ampato volcanoes featured an ice cap with an area of about 347 square kilometres (134 sq mi).

The timing of glaciation in the Peruvian Andes is complex, with evidence of glacial advances at Hualca Hualca both during the last glacial maximum and the "Tauca" and "Coipasa" periods. The advances produced several generations of moraines, and eroded older moraines. Cosmogenic isotope dating has yielded ages of 17,000–16,000 and 12,000 years ago for glacial advances at Hualca Hualca, implying that glacier retreat at Hualca Hualca occurred later than at other Central Andean volcanoes. Final glacier retreat occurred at the beginning of the Holocene; two advances in the Huayuray valley have been attributed to the Little Ice Age. The moraines at Hualca Hualca have been used to reconstruct equilibrium line altitude and temperature changes during the glaciation.

Glaciers persist around the summit in active cirques, and there is permanent snow cover on the subsidiary peaks. There are crevasses and seracs. Rock glaciers occur in numerous locations around the mountain. The glaciers are retreating; the Huayuray glacier lost half its surface area between 1955 and 2000 and a further near-halving occurred between 2000 and 2008; the Ampato volcanic complex might lose all of its glaciers by 2065, threatening water supplies in the region.

== Eruption history ==
Hualca Hualca was active during the Pliocene and Pleistocene. It formed in several stages, with initial activity producing andesitic to dacitic-trachydacitic lava flows that build the main edifice and crop out in the collapse scar. Dates ranging from 1.07±0.3 million years ago to 610,000±10,000 years ago have been obtained from this unit. Hydrothermal alteration and volcanic activity weakened the mountain until collapse, which did not occur during an eruption but may have been triggered by an earthquake. The first collapse removed the central sector of the volcano; subsequent activity rebuilt the summit and spilled lava flows over the northeastern flank without filling in the entire scar.

550,000 years ago, activity moved from the rebuilt summit into the collapse scar and produced Nevado de Puye, the Mirador Cruz del Condor and Cerro Ahuashune; dating has yielded ages of 416,000±34,000 years ago at Nevado de Puye and of 600,000±300,000 years ago at Ahuashune. A second, much smaller collapse during the last 600,000 years left a debris avalanche deposit inside the old collapse scar, which was originally incorrectly attributed to the first collapse. It dammed the Colca River, forming a now-vanished lake that reached until the present-day town of Chivay and left lake sediments until it overflowed and broke the dam. It is possible that both the first and second collapses formed lakes in the Colca Valley, and other lakes were formed by lava flows. The second collapse did not greatly alter the structure of Hualca Hualca. Lahars formed when volcanic activity impacted snowfields and flowed into the Colca Valley. Ignimbrites on the slopes testify to past explosive eruptions.

The youngest date obtained on Hualca Hualca is 164,000 years ago. The volcano is considered extinct; gullying, glacial erosion and hydrothermal alteration have taken place. There may be Holocene vents with short lava flows southwest of the summit.

=== Fumarolic activity and interactions with Sabancaya ===
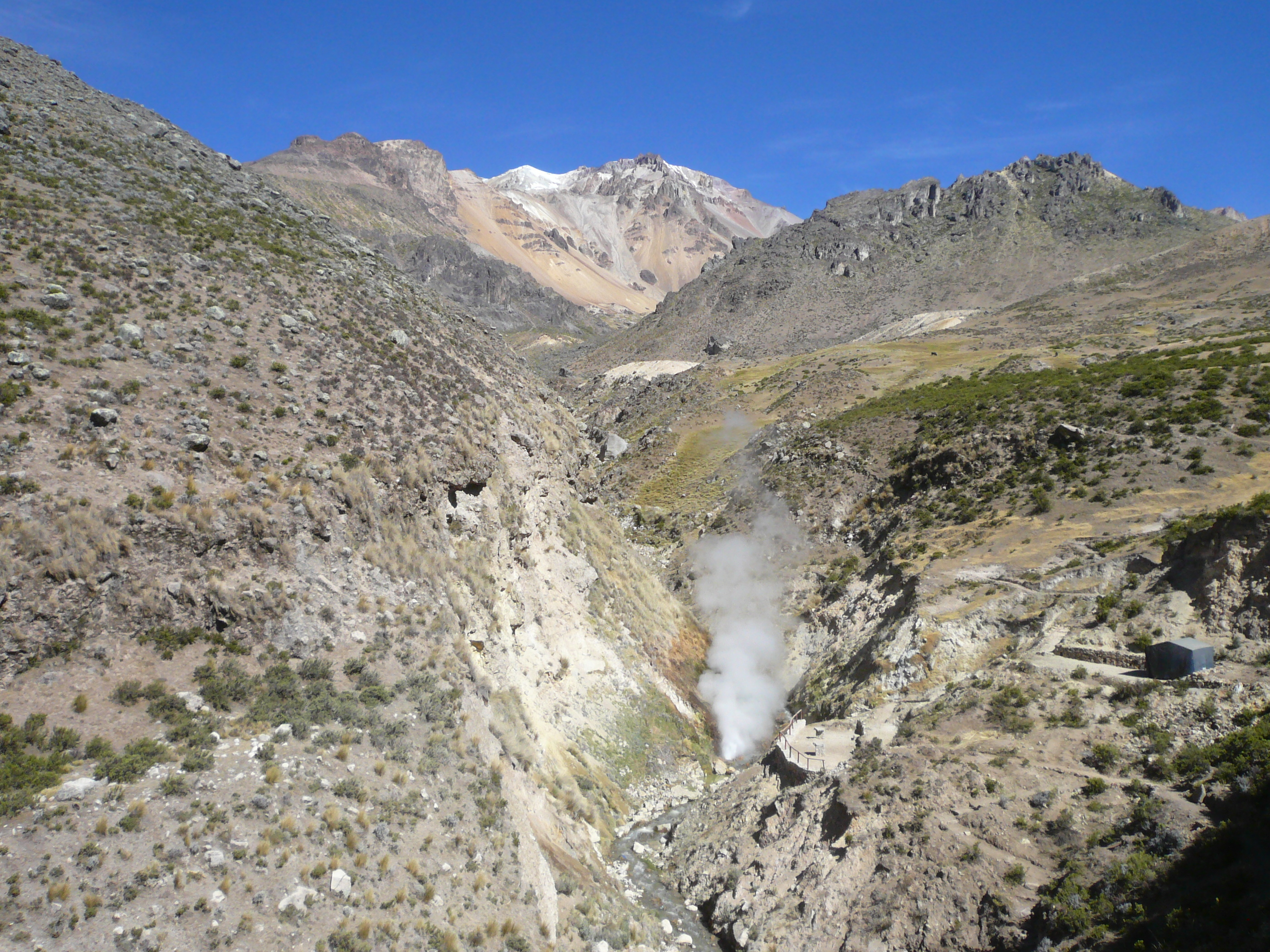
The Pinchollo geyser

Hualca Hualca features fumarolic activity. A few kilometres north of the summit is a group of originally three geysers; one was buried by an earthquake in 2001 and another became a hot spring. The active geyser is known as "Pinchollo". Other geothermal manifestations are a solfatara, gas venting at Paclla, and hot springs in the amphitheatre such as Puye Puye, where there are mud pools. Some of these geothermal manifestations may reflect local tectonic features rather than being part of Hualca Hualca's volcanic system.

A hydrothermal system underlies the Ampato volcanic complex, including Hualca Hualca, where it feeds the hot springs and geysers, perhaps with water pooled in one of the buried calderas and heated by the magma under Hualca Hualca.

The magma chambers of Sabancaya are situated at about 13 kilometres (8.1 mi) depth under Hualca Hualca, where magma evolves and ascends into the former volcano. There have been several episodes of surface uplift at Hualca Hualca linked to magma movements in the magmatic system:

- Between 1992 and 1996, totalling about 2 centimetres (0.79 in) per year and followed by deflation lasting until 1999. This uplift is colocated with one of the buried calderas.
- Uplift between 2012 and 2019 caused numerous earthquakes north of Hualca Hualca when fault zones there failed under the pressure, and increased heat flow boosted activity in the fumaroles at Hualca Hualca.
- Between 2014 and 2020 the mountain rose at a rate of 4.5 centimetres (1.8 in) per year.

The deformation implies magma movements of 0.1 cubic kilometres (0.024 cu mi) and is not strongly correlated to activity at Sabancaya. Such offset magmatic systems are not unusual among volcanoes. The magmatic system experiences the entry of new mafic magmas, that in turn drives activity in the shallow magmatic system and eruptions at Sabancaya, while explaining the low correlation between deformation and activity at Sabancaya.

Hualca Hualca is also impacted on the surface by activity at Sabancaya, recent eruptions have deposited volcanic ash on Hualca Hualca. The volcano is within the hazard zone of Sabancaya; ash falls from the latter volcano can melt the ice on Hualca Hualca to form lahars, threatening agricultural land and infrastructure such as the regionally important Majes-Siguas canal. Volcanic fallout from Sabancaya is frequent.

== Name, religious and cultural importance ==
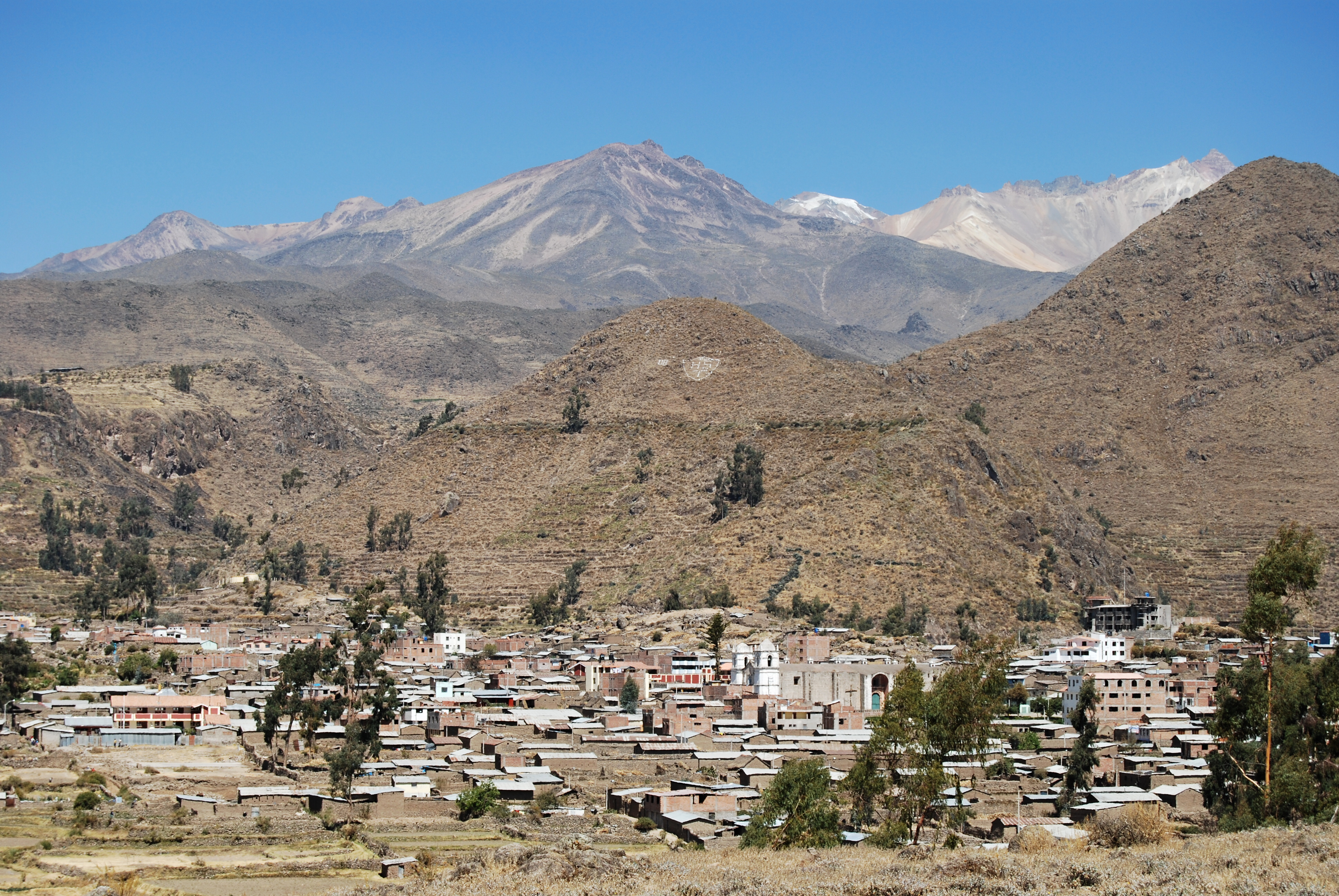
Hualca Hualca rises above Cabanaconde.

During Inca times, Hualca Hualca was regarded as an apu, a mountain deity. During eruptions of Sabancaya, the Inca rulers offered sacrifices, such as the mummy Juanita at Ampato, to the apus of the region including Hualca Hualca. The veneration is attested since the 16th century, but probably pre-dates Inca rule, and remains of the offerings have been found at an elevation of 5,800 metres (19,000 ft) at Hualca Hualca. It continued after the Spanish conquest, with Hualca Hualca being attested as a huaca. In October 2011, the inhabitants of Pinchollo organized a procession on the mountain (accompanied by Catholic ritual) and offered various sacrifices. The mountain is also the principal deity of Cabanaconde and important to their cultural identity; the inhabitants call it their mother and liken its water to a mother's milk. Women's hats in Cabanaconde are white and they represent the snow cover of the mountain. The inhabitants of Cabanaconde were sometimes compared to the misshapen mountain, with the Collaguas people calling their heads "ugly and disproportionate". People preparing to emigrate conducted a ritual invoking the mountains of the region, including Hualca Hualca, before departing. In Chivay, a church is built in a manner that visitors face the mountain.

According to the founding mythology of Cabanaconde, humans walked out of the mountain. People in southern Peru believed that children were sacrificed to Hualca Hualca. The mountain is considered to be a female entity, which was reflected in the gender norms at Cabanaconde. People living in Cabanaconde and Pinchollo view the mountain as the source of their water, which flows down through streams and canals into their lands, and the offerings aim at preserving a stable water supply. Before the advent of the Majes canal, people in Cabanaconde used to perform a regular water ritual at Hualca Hualca to begin each irrigation cycle and went every year to the mountain as a community-wide ceremony to assure the continued supply of water. Despite initial resistance to the Majes canal project and disputes about its supply, the town eventually began to use it and the water rituals involving Hualca Hualca largely (but not entirely) stopped.

== See also ==
- List of mountains in the Andes
