= Cabanaconde District =

Coordinates: 15°37′S 71°58′W

Cabanaconde Qhawana Kunti
- District
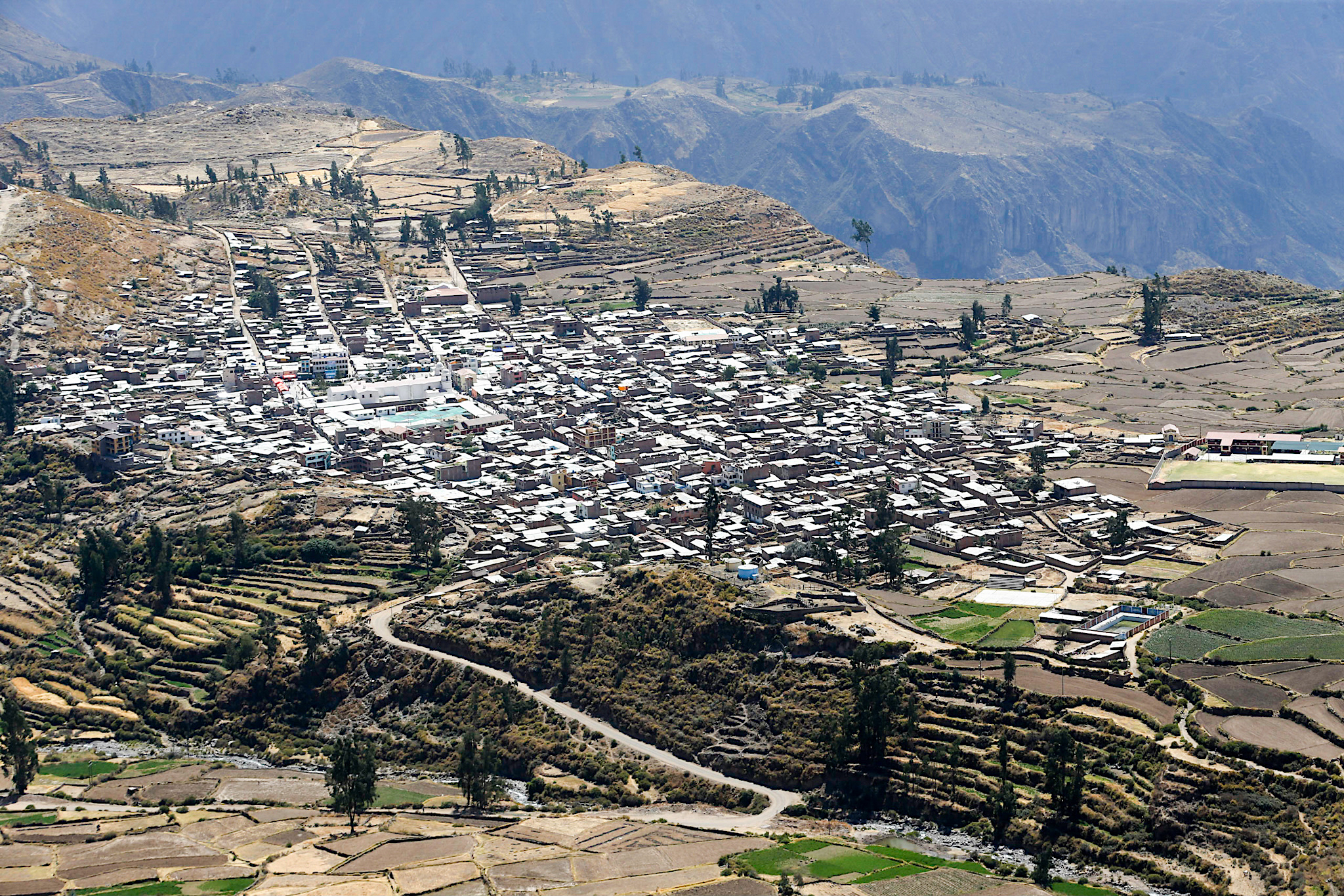
- Interactive map of Cabanaconde
- Country: Peru
- Region: Arequipa
- Province: Caylloma
- Capital: Cabanaconde

Government
  - Mayor: Jorge Alfredo Guerra Bernedo

Area
  - Total: 460.55 km^{2} (177.82 sq mi)
- Elevation: 3,287 m (10,784 ft)

Population (2005 census)
  - Total: 2,920
  - Density: 6.34/km^{2} (16.4/sq mi)
- Time zone: UTC-5 (PET)
- UBIGEO: 040503

Cabanaconde or Qhawana Kunti (Quechua) is one of twenty districts of the Caylloma Province in Peru.

== Geography ==
One of the highest mountains of the district is Hualca Hualca at 6,025 m (19,767 ft). Other mountains are listed below:

- Jach'umani
- Chuwa Qucha
- Kuntur
- Kuntur Sinqa
- Lipayuq
- Luk'i Urqu
- Pukarilla
- Puru Pakisqa
- Phuyphu
- Wanqarani
- Yaritayuq

== Images ==
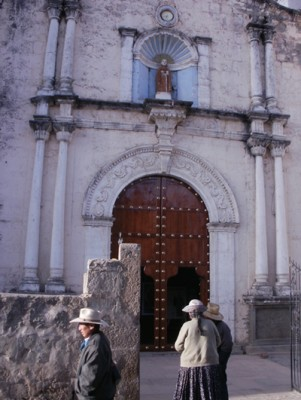
Early morning at the side entrance to the church in Cabanaconde

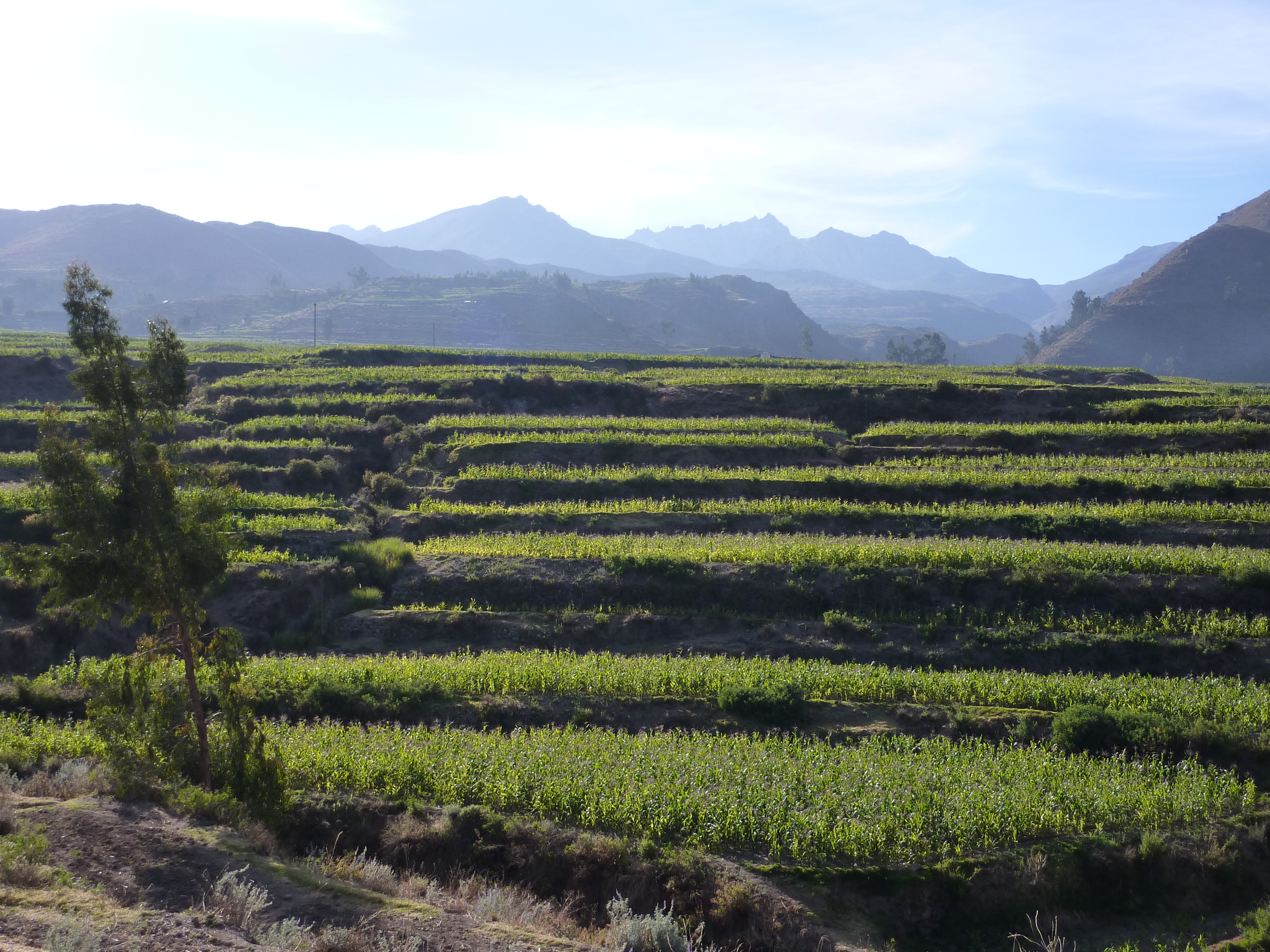
Agricultural terraces of corn near Cabanaconde

== See also ==
- Chila mountain range
- Muyurqa Lake
