= Mantaro =

Mantaro may refer to:

- Mantarō, a masculine Japanese given name
- Mantaro Valley, a valley in Peru
- Mantaro River, a river in Peru
