= Maca District =

Coordinates: 15.6425°S 71.7699°W

Maca Maqa
- District
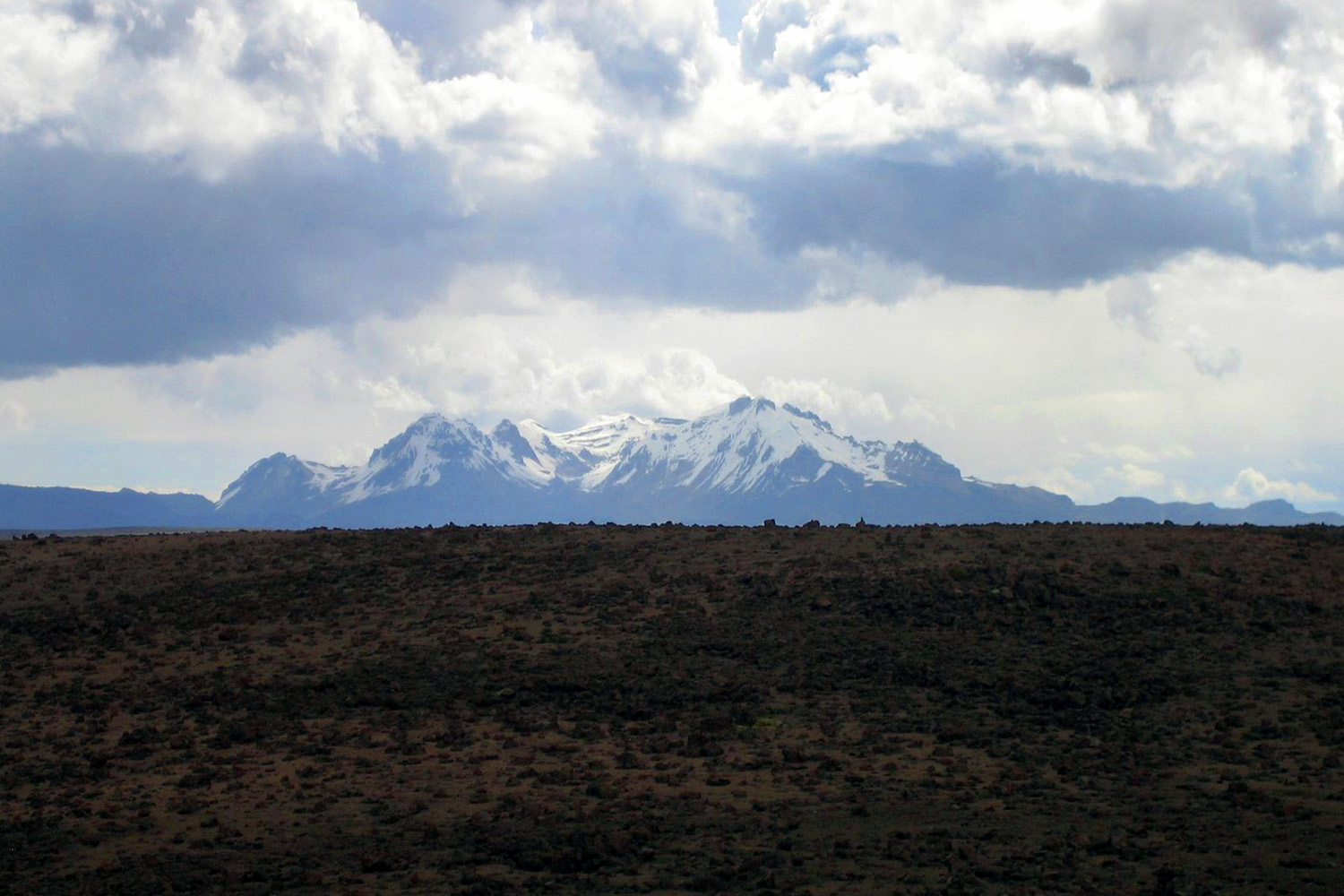
- Hualca Hualca, Maca District
- Interactive map of Maca
- Country: Peru
- Region: Arequipa
- Province: Caylloma
- Capital: Maca

Government
  - Mayor: Hugo Eulogio Apaza Nina

Area
  - Total: 227.48 km^{2} (87.83 sq mi)
- Elevation: 3,262 m (10,702 ft)

Population (2005 census)
  - Total: 1,307
  - Density: 5.746/km^{2} (14.88/sq mi)
- Time zone: UTC-5 (PET)
- UBIGEO: 040512

Maca District is one of twenty districts of the province Caylloma in Peru.

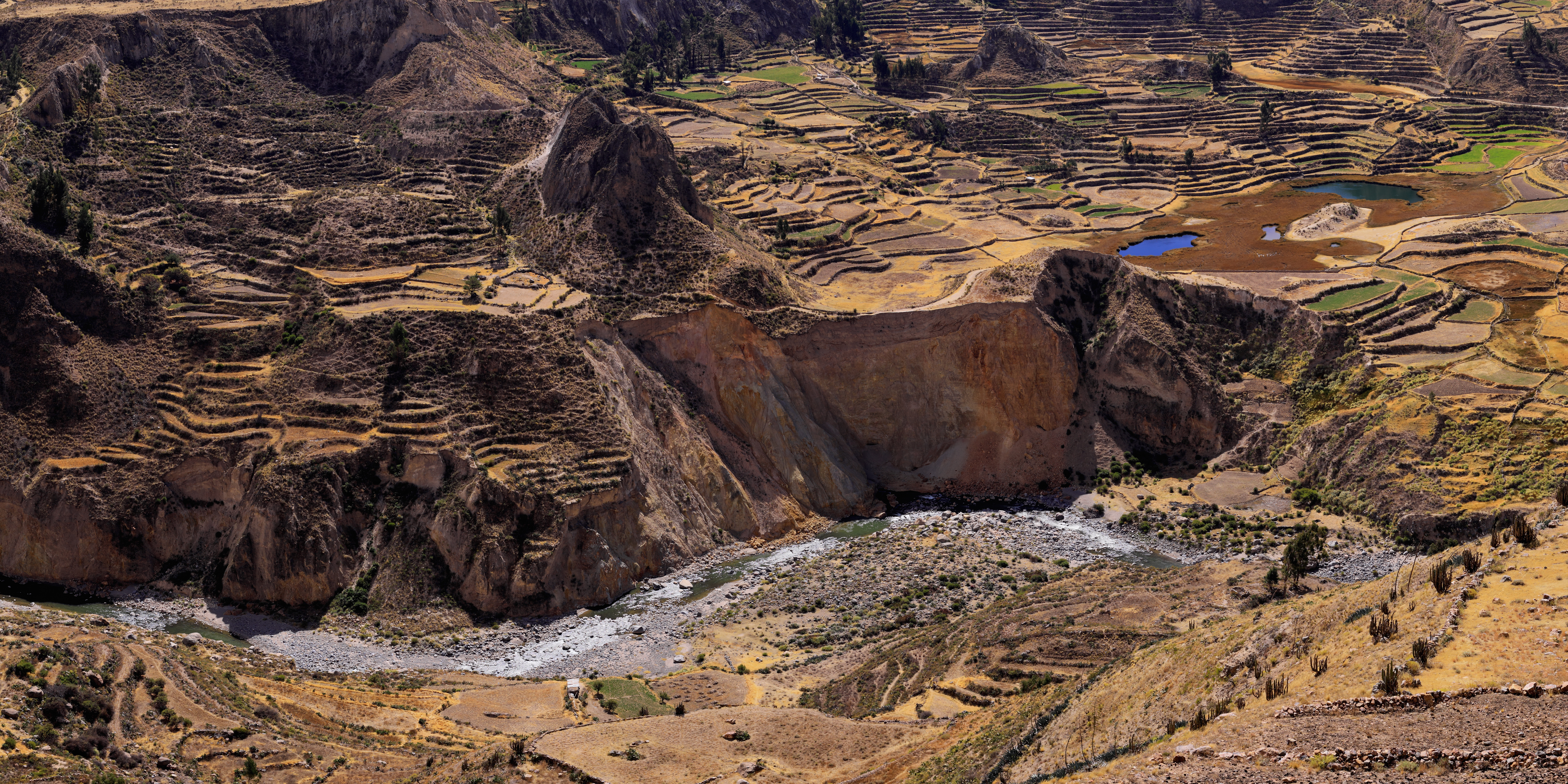
Colca River on the northern border of the Maca District

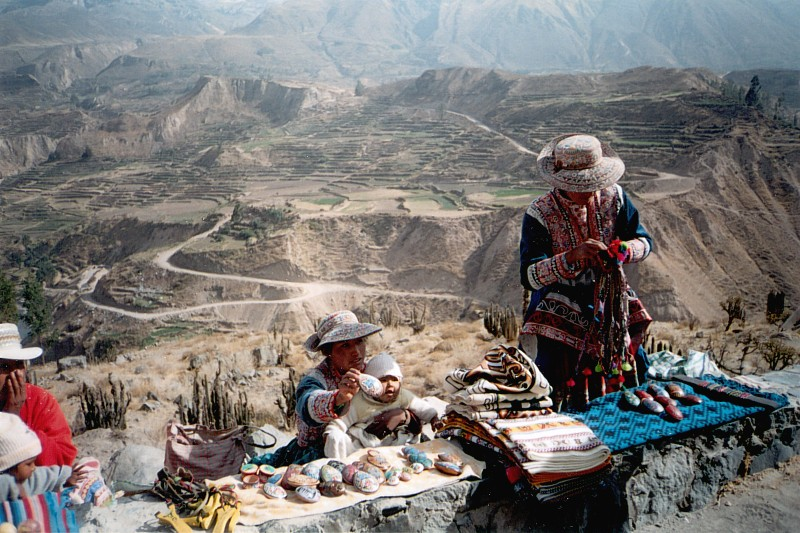
Souvenir sellers west of Maca

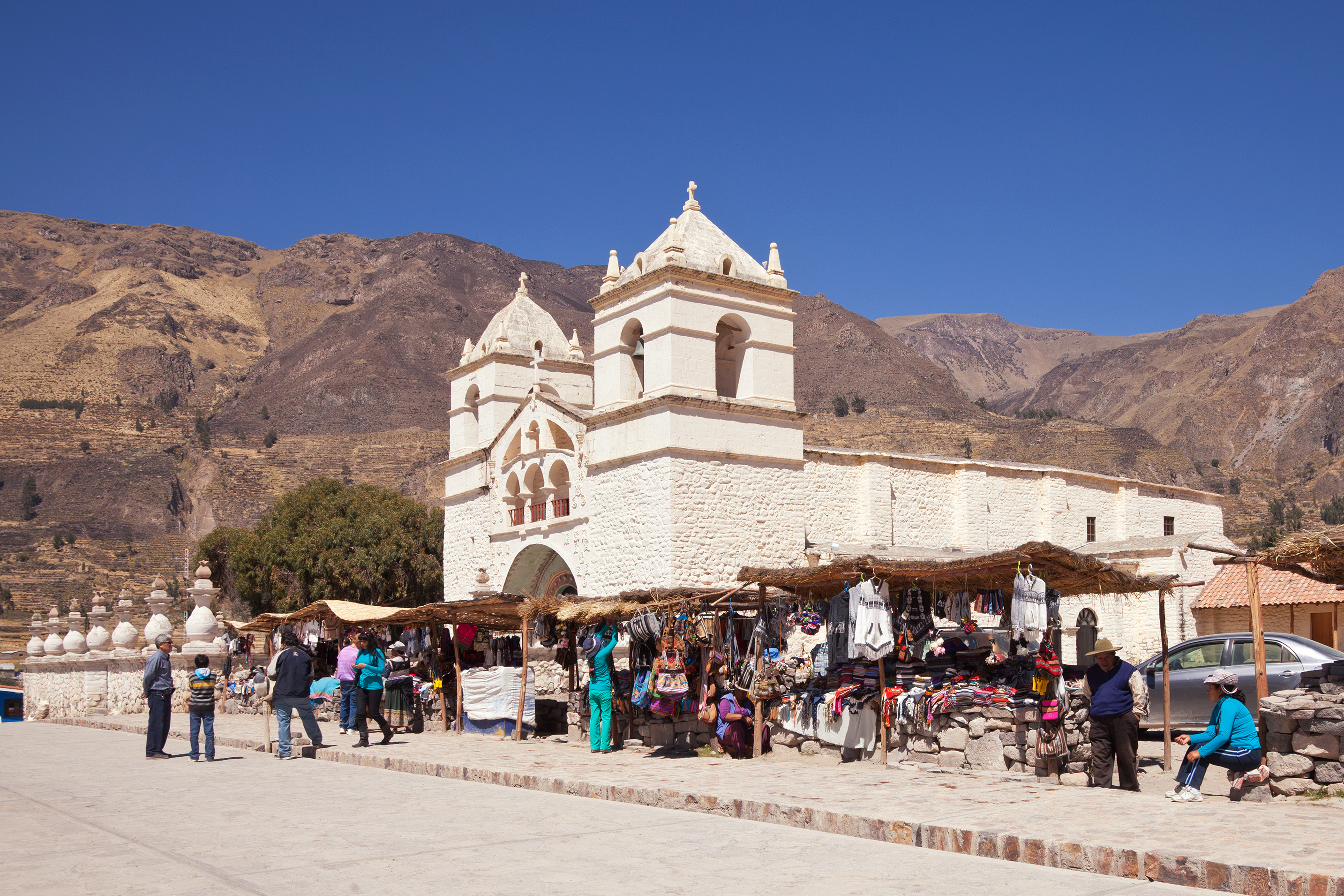
the church in Maca

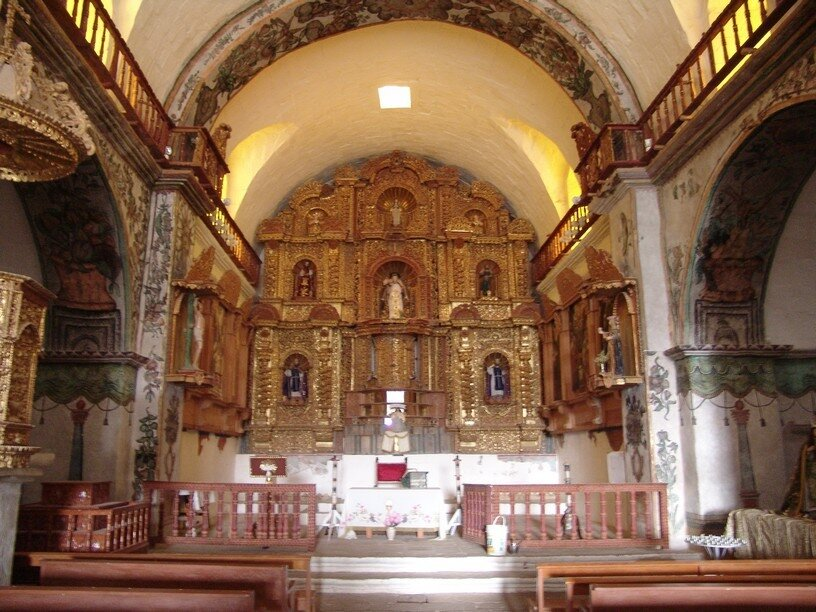
The church in Maca (altar)

== See also ==
- Colca River
- Hualca Hualca
