= Purupuruni =

Group of lava domes in southern Peru

- Purupurini
- Location within Peru

Highest point
- Elevation: 5,315 m (17,438 ft)
- Coordinates: 17°19′S 69°54′W

Geography
- Location: Peru, Tacna Region
- Parent range: Andes

Geology
- Rock age: Holocene

Purupuruni is a group of lava domes in southern Peru and a correlative geological formation. They are among the many volcanoes that exist in Peru and whose activity has been associated with the subduction of the Nazca Plate beneath the South America Plate. Purupuruni is associated with a geothermal field and a caldera. Volcanic activity occurred during the Pleistocene 53,000 ± 8,000 years ago but also during the Holocene about 5,300 ± 1,100 years ago; today the volcano is considered to be a low hazard volcano but is being monitored nevertheless.

== Geography and geomorphology ==
Purupuruni lies in the Cordillera Occidental 48 kilometres (30 mi) north of the border with Chile, about 85 kilometres (53 mi) away from Tacna and only about 70 kilometres (43 mi) from the town of Tarata. The volcano is part of the Monumento Natural de Los Volcanes de Mauri geopark. The term Phuru means dung in Aymara.

The Purupuruni volcano, also known as Purupurini, is a 0.85 kilometres (0.53 mi) wide complex of four large lava domes at an elevation of 5,117 metres (16,788 ft) or 5,315 metres (17,438 ft). The domes cover an area of about 3.5–7 square kilometres (1.4–2.7 sq mi), are up to 200 metres (660 ft)-500 metres (1,600 ft) high and are isolated and little eroded. The domes are accompanied by intrusions and lava and pyroclastic flow deposits.

The volcanism appears to come from fissure vents and the volcanoes have been affected by faulting, such as the Pacollo fault. These deposits reach thicknesses of 10 metres (33 ft) and also occur on neighbouring volcanic centres. Purupuruni has formed on the rim of a depression, which is surrounded by eroded Quaternary volcanoes and appears to be a 13 kilometres (8.1 mi) wide caldera southwest of the domes. The volcano lies east-southeast from Yucamane volcano and just south of the Mauri River; the Mauri River is part of the Lake Titicaca watershed.

The Borateras geothermal field with about 40 separate manifestations is associated with Purupuruni and neighbouring volcanoes such as Coverane and Jaruma across the Mauri River and west from Purupuruni respectively. The Borateras field is used as a spa at the Calachaca spa. The landscape is relatively dry and cold and thus vegetation is scarce.

== Geology ==
The volcanic rocks are mainly andesitic and dacitic, and contain amphibole, biotite, olivine, plagioclase and pyroxene and are among the most differentiated volcanics in the area. They are part of the wider "Purupurini Volcanics", which are named after Purupuruni and also form other volcanoes in the region.

=== Geological context ===
Rock formations in the region include the Mesozoic Yura Group sediments, the Toquepala intrusive rocks, the 30-24 million years old Tacaza volcanic rocks, the 24-10 million years old Huaylillas volcanic rocks and the 10-3 million years old Barroso volcanic rocks; Purupuruni is considered to be part of this Barroso formation. Purupuruni and neighbouring volcanic centres have formed on the Cretaceous sedimentary basement.

Volcanism in Peru occurs mainly in the southern part of the country, where there are about 300 separate volcanic systems including El Misti, Ubinas, Ticsani, Sabancaya and Huaynaputina. In the Tacna Region of Peru alone there are over 60 separate volcanoes, two of which, Tutupaca and Yucamane, have been active in historical time. In addition, there are a number of geothermal systems with temperatures of over 200 °C (392 °F) which could be used to produce geothermal energy. Volcanic and geothermal activity in the region is a consequence of the subduction of the Nazca Plate beneath the South America Plate at a rate of about 7–9 centimetres per year (2.8–3.5 in/year).

== Geologic history ==
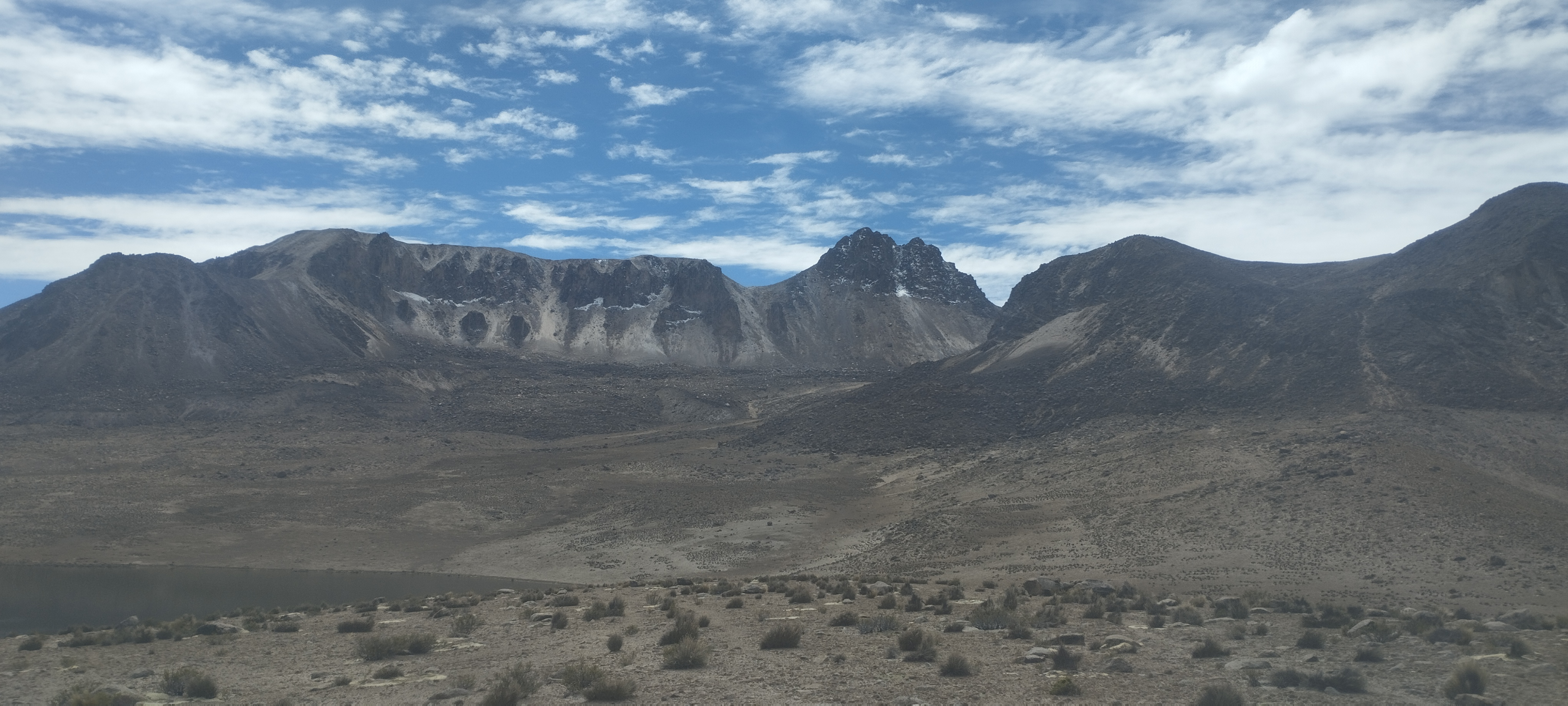
View of the southern domes of Purupuruni.

The volcanic centres in the area including Purupuruni are of Miocene to Pliocene age, and appear to be of Pleistocene age. Purupuruni formed during the last 100,000 years and appears to have developed between two interglacials; fission-track dating on glasses from Purupuruni has yielded ages of 53,000 ± 8,000 years ago but more recent surface exposure dating has yielded an age of 5,300 ± 1,100 years before present on one of the southern domes. The volcano is considered to be a low-hazard system and in 2018 the Peruvian Geological Institute announced it would begin monitoring Purupuruni and nine other volcanoes. Earthquake swarms in 2020 and 2021 do not appear to have been caused by volcanism; they are instead linked to local fault activity. Purupuruni appears to be the heat source for the Kovire geothermal field.

Glacial erosion took place on Purupuruni during the Pleistocene, leaving moraines on the domes although research published in 2019 has found that the domes have not been eroded by glaciers even though evidence of glaciation occurs in the wider area. Alluvial, glacial and fluvial deposits occur in the region, with aeolian sediments consisting of volcanic ash mantling the volcanic structures.
