= Lake Mucurca =

Lake in Peru

- Location within Peru
- Location: Arequipa Region
- Coordinates: 15°45′21″S 72°00′48″W
- Basin countries: Peru
- Max. length: 5.8 km (3.6 mi)
- Max. width: 1.57 km (0.98 mi)
- Surface elevation: 4,310 m (14,140 ft)

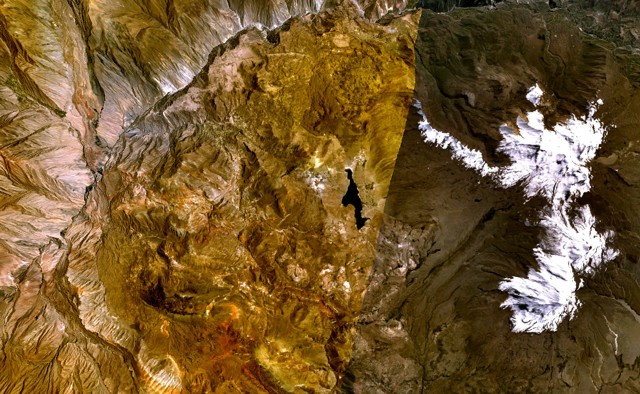
Mucurca Lake (in the middle), Lipayuq (middle, right), Hualca Hualca, Sabancaya (on the right)

Lake Mucurca (possibly from Quechua muyuy to turn, to move circularly / to turn a body around its axis, -rqa verbal suffix) is a lake in Peru located in the Arequipa Region, Caylloma Province, Cabanaconde District. It lies west of the Sabancaya volcanic complex. The lake is about 5.8 km long and 1.57 km at its widest point.

== See also ==
- List of lakes in Peru
