= Huambo volcanic field =

Volcanic field in Peru

Coordinates: 15.83°S 72.13°W

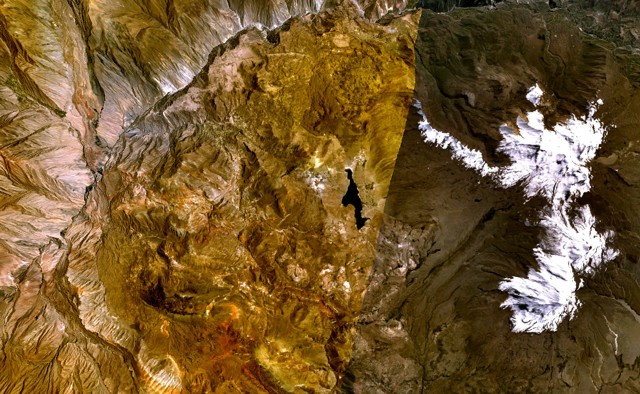

Huambo volcanic field is a volcanic field in Peru. Andahua-Orcopampa lies north-northeast and Sabancaya east of Huambo, east of the Rio Colca. The town of Huambo lies between the two fields.

The northern part of the field was active 700 BCE ± 50 years, forming a large lava flow field and a cinder cone Cerro Keyocc. The southern part of the field contains other cinder cones and lava flows. Some may be of Holocene age. Lava flows are a few 10 metres (33 ft) thick. Four among the volcanoes of the southern field are Marbas Grande, Marbas, Marbas Chico I and Marbas Chico II. The formation of these fields may have been influenced by magma ascent along deep fault systems.

Trachyandesite is the major eruption product of Huambo. The magmas forming this field formed in deep magma chambers with little modification in shallower magma chambers. Basement lava flows have been dated at 1.05±0.04 mya. The Huambo field is located within the Arequipa crustal domain.

== See also ==
- List of volcanic fields
