= Ticsani =

Volcano in Peru

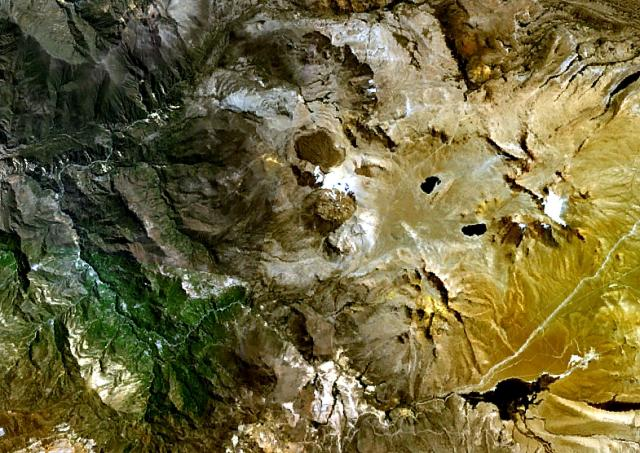
- The Ticsani lava dome complex (center)

Highest point
- Elevation: 5,408 m (17,743 ft)
- Coordinates: 16°45′18″S 70°35′42″W

Geography
- Location within Peru
- Location: Moquegua Region
- Parent range: Andes

Geology
- Mountain type: Lava domes
- Last eruption: 1800 ± 200 years

Ticsani is a volcano in Peru northeast of Moquegua and consists of two volcanoes ("Old Ticsani" and "Modern Ticsani") that form a complex. "Old Ticsani" is a compound volcano that underwent a large collapse in the past and shed 15–30 cubic kilometres (3.6–7.2 cu mi) of mass down the Rio Tambo valley. Today an arcuate ridge remains of this edifice. "Modern Ticsani" is a complex of three lava domes which were emplaced during the Holocene. Two large eruptions took place during the Holocene, producing the so-called "Grey Ticsani" and "Brown Ticsani" deposits; the last eruption occurred after the 1600 eruption of neighbouring Huaynaputina. The volcano is seismically active and features active hot springs and fumaroles; since 2015 the volcano is monitored by the Peruvian government.

== Geography and geomorphology ==
Ticsani is in the Ichuna District of Peru, 59 kilometres (37 mi) northwest of Moquegua. The Putina River passes northwest and the Carumas River southwest of the volcano. The area is remote, which has hampered exploration efforts. There are paved roads in the area, which can be accessed mainly through the Ilo-Desaguadero highway that passes within 12 kilometres (7.5 mi) from the Ticsani domes.

Volcanism in South America occurs along its western coast and in several volcanic belts, including the Central Volcanic Zone that Ticsani is part of. In southern Peru the Central Volcanic Zone includes the volcanoes Solimana, Coropuna, Ampato, Sabancaya, Chachani, El Misti, Ubinas, Huaynaputina, Ticsani, Tutupaca, Calientes, Yucamane, Purupuruni and Casiri. The volcanoes of Peru were active in the Plio-Quaternary and produced mainly calc-alkaline magmas such as andesite although more silicic rocks also occur.

Ticsani features three lava domes, which were generated by latest Pleistocene and Holocene activity; two of which are located within or at the margins of craters. The southeasternmost dome is 1.6 kilometres (0.99 mi) wide and 250 metres (820 ft) high, the middle dome with a width of 2 kilometres (1.2 mi) and a height of no less than 0.25 kilometres (0.16 mi) is the largest of Ticsani. The northwestern dome has dimensions of 1.95 by 1.5 kilometres (1.21 mi × 0.93 mi). Pyroclastic flow deposits, generated during the collapse and growth of the lava domes, fill shallow valleys on the eastern flank. An earlier compound volcano is today preserved as a 3 kilometres (1.9 mi) long arcuate ridge, which is northeast of the northernmost dome and opens to the west. This earlier volcano ("old Ticsani") crops out over an area of 65 square kilometres (25 sq mi) and consists of ignimbrites, lava flows, volcaniclastic deposits and debris from a large sector collapse; a cryptodome is exposed within the arcuate ridge. The complex reaches an elevation of 5,408 metres (17,743 ft). The position of the lava domes and the structure of the compound volcano were influenced by local fault systems.

== Geology ==
Off the southwestern coast of South America, the Nazca Plate subducts beneath the South America Plate in the Peru-Chile Trench, at a rate of 10.3 centimetres per year (4.1 in/year). This subduction process is responsible for the growth of the Andes and for volcanism in the region; the oblique character of subduction has further led to the onset of strike-slip faulting.

Ticsani is grouped together with the neighbouring volcanoes Huaynaputina and Ubinas, given their tectonic context, which is unusual for Peruvian volcanoes and shared geochemical traits. Huaynaputina had a large eruption in 1600 and Ubinas is presently the most active volcano in southern Peru. These volcanoes appear to share a magma chamber at a depth of 20–30 kilometres (12–19 mi).

The basement on which these volcanoes rose includes a Paleoproterozoic pluton. It is covered by the Mesozoic Yura Group and Matalaque Formation (sedimentary and volcanic rocks, respectively) which are exposed at the Rio Tambo. Volcanic activity continued during the Miocene, Pliocene and Pleistocene, forming ignimbrites and the Barroso Group.

=== Composition ===
The complex has erupted andesite during the compound volcano stage and dacite during the lava dome stage; both define a potassium-rich calc-alkaline suite. Phenocrysts found in the later eruption products include amphibole, biotite, feldspar, plagioclase, pyroxene and quartz.

== Eruption history ==
Ticsani was active during the Pleistocene and Holocene. At first, a compound volcano developed at Ticsani. This volcano collapsed and formed a landslide deposit in the Rio Tambo valley which originally had a volume of about 15–30 cubic kilometres (3.6–7.2 cu mi), and is thus the largest such collapse in southern Peru during the Pleistocene. This volcano stage constitutes the "old Ticsani". The later "modern Ticsani" produced lava flows and later the lava domes; the lava flows may have issued from a now almost entirely buried crater.

Later the three lava domes (Note: Sometimes four domes are counted, the fourth one east of the three canonical domes.) were emplaced, with the southeastern dome being the oldest and the northwestern the youngest. Two or three explosive eruptions took place, accompanied by the emission of volcanic ash, blocks, lava bombs and pumice. The first eruption with a tephra volume of about 0.4 cubic kilometres (0.096 cu mi)-0.5 cubic kilometres (0.12 cu mi) (Note: The eruption has been assigned a volcanic explosivity index of 4.) happened at 10,600 ± 80 years before present, and is known as the "Grey Ticsani" Pumice eruption. It is the most important explosive eruption at Ticsani and its deposits form large desertic landscapes east of the volcano. A second eruption formed the "Grey Ticsani" Ash and may have occurred in the middle Holocene. The last sub-Plinian to phreatomagmatic eruption ("Brown Ticsani") took place after the Huaynaputina eruption of 1600, generating about 0.015 cubic kilometres (0.0036 cu mi) of tephra (Note: This eruption has been assigned a volcanic explosivity index of 2-3.) and occurred before the formation of the youngest lava dome. This volcano stage also produced lava flows which filled valleys, formed a lava flow field northwest of the volcano and pyroclastic flows on the eastern side of the volcano. Ticsani is a candidate source for the Khonkho tephra, which was emplaced in Bolivia between AD 400 and 700. There are no historical eruptions at Ticsani.

Presently, hot springs are found in the valleys west of Ticsani, and two fumaroles have been observed at its summit. Known springs occur at Chuchumbaya, Putina Arriba and Secolaque; the Putina River hot springs are among the most important in Peru. In 2005, earthquake activity was noted beneath Ticsani, possibly related to a hydrothermal system, which raised alarm and concern among the local population. A seismic swarm took place between 2014-2017. A characteristic trait of Ticsani are so-called "hybrid" earthquakes which are noticed at seismic stations of other volcanoes. A temporary seismic station installed 2015 at Ticsani recorded volcano-tectonic earthquakes, and other changes in its behaviour have been observed as well.

=== Hazards ===
About 5,000 people live within 15 kilometres (9.3 mi) to Ticsani and would be threatened in the case of a future eruption, with particular hazards including ash fall, lahars, pyroclastic flows and the collapse of lava domes. Large explosive events like the "Grey Ticsani" and "Brown Ticsani" eruptions ejected material mainly in north-northeastern and southeastern direction; in case of a repeat eruption the towns Calacoa, Cuchumbaya, Quebaya, San Cristóbal and Soquezane would be impacted by tephra fallout. In addition to the local population, ashfall would hit major regional roads, reservoirs, mines and airports. Additional towns in the area include Cambrune and Carumas. Pyroclastic flows are fast-moving flows of hot rock fragments and gases; at Ticsani they have reached distances of at least 5 kilometres (3.1 mi) from the volcano. A repeat of the sector collapse of the "old Ticsani" is improbable as the "modern Ticsani" is considered to be stable, but parts of the old volcano could still fail and generate lahars in the river valleys. Volcanic gases may accumulate in valleys and depressions, while lava flows are unlikely to reach large distances and are thus minor threats.

The volcano is classified as being a "High Risk Volcano". In 2015, facilities to monitor the chemical composition of hot springs around the volcano were installed, and devices to recognize deformations of the volcanic edifices are installed. The Peruvian Southern Volcanological Observatory (Observatorio Vulcanológico del Sur) publishes monthly reports on Ticsani since 2014, which include reports on seismic activity and on sulfur dioxide emissions.
