= Majes-Siguas =

Majes-Siguas is an irrigation project in Peru which envisages transferring water from the Colca River to the Siguas River for irrigation purposes, and further to take water from the Apurimac River.

== The project ==
The original plan of the project involved the construction of a 101.2 kilometres (62.9 mi) long aqueduct that diverts water from the Rio Colca close to Tuti and transfers it around Ampato mountain to a canal which ends into the Siguas River. The diversion has a capacity of 34 cubic metres per second (1,200 cu ft/s) and is part of the first stage of the project. The diversion has a hydraulic drop of about 1,930 metres (6,330 ft) and it is envisaged to exploit it for hydropower production at the Lluta and Lluclla hydropower stations, yielding 280 megawatts (380,000 hp) and 380 megawatts (510,000 hp) respectively; the company Luz del Sur was tasked to construct these plants. From the Siguas River a 15.7 kilometres (9.8 mi) long tunnel-canal starting at Pitay delivers the water to the Pampa de Majes. As part of the project, the Condoroma Reservoir with a capacity of 0.285 cubic kilometres (0.068 cu mi) on the Colca.

The Angostura Reservoir is part of Majes-Siguas II. This reservoir with a capacity of 1.140 cubic kilometres (0.274 cu mi) is located on the Apurimac River at its confluence with the Rio Hornillos and transfers the water through a 18.4 kilometres (11.4 mi) long aqueduct to the Colca River. As part of Majes-Siguas II, another diversion at Lluclla can divert as much as 23 cubic metres per second (810 cu ft/s) in a 15.95 kilometres (9.91 mi) long canal to the Pampa de Siguas.

== Effects ==
The Majes-Siguas project allowed the irrigation of 15,950 hectares (39,400 acres) land, which were settled by about 2693 colonists, and the development of about 5700 households. As part of the second stage, a further expansion of 8,000 hectares (20,000 acres) in the Pampa de Majes and of 38,500 hectares (95,000 acres) in the Pampa de Siguas is envisaged. Also, the second stage foresees the development of about 560 megawatts (750,000 hp) hydropower, with hydropower plants being constructed along the aqueduct that transfers water from the Colca to the Siguas.

The irrigated area has been planted with artichokes, avocado, cantaloupe, chili pepper, cochineal, garlic, grapes, kiwicha, onion, paprika, peas, quinoa and tomatoes; also there is a dairy industry at Majes-Siguas. The total productivity of the project has been estimated to be US$152,375,853, and Majes-Siguas is projected to yield a further gross domestic product of US$853,000,000 per year, as well as benefitting 300,000 people.

Water leaks and destabilization of the clayey soils by waters from sprinkler irrigation have caused landslides, sometimes approaching the Pan-American Highway, and concerns have been raised that the expansion of the Majes-Siguas project through Majes-Siguas II will aggravate the situation.

== History ==
In 1971, the construction of the Majes-Siguas project was declared necessary by the decree No.18375 in order to develop Southern Peru and in the next year another decree classified it as a regional development project. Work began on the 3 October 1971; about US$1,503,000,000 were invested in the project.

In 1982, the statutory corporation AUTODEMA was created in order to administer the project. In 2018, concerns were raised about corruption in AUTODEMA including fabricated expenses, resulting in an investigation by the Comptroller General of Peru.

Between 2006 and 2010, the second stage of Majes-Siguas (Majes-Siguas II) was planned, including the development of an environmental impact statement for the Angostura Dam. An investment of US$2,018,622,950-US$1,514,761,200 was projected for Majes-Siguas II. In 2014-2015, laws were enacted authorizing the acquisition of land for the construction of Majes-Siguas II, which was also declared a "project of public need". In 2014, US$550,401,572 were projected as investment in Majes-Siguas II, which is considered to be payable with the revenue from hydropower and the newly cultivated land. The project is being carried out through a public-private partnership involving the state and the "Angostura-Siguas Consortium". The work on the Apurimac-Colca diversion project began in 2017, with a ceremony in the presence of the then Peruvian president Pedro Pablo Kuczynski.

== Political considerations ==
Generally, though, the execution of Majes-Siguas II has been stalled by the review process and by bureaucratic issues. In November 2018, a commission of the Congress of Peru started investigating events surrounding Majes-Siguas II, including the delay but especially the decision by the Governor of Arequipa Region to modify the construction contract which raised the price of the project and the exact nature of this modification, which involved using pipelines instead of canals at a price exceeding US$100,000,000. This change known as "Addendum 13" had been proposed after the project had met resistance by the people of Espinar Province which were afraid that the Angostura Dam would impact their own agricultural development. The technological change was aimed at reducing the water needs of Majes-Siguas II by reducing evaporation, but raised criticism by lawmakers about the extra cost to the state. Another question raised by the Governor of Arequipa is whether to allow lots of sizes less than 200 hectares (490 acres); the present-day arrangement disallows lots smaller than this as the project is export-oriented. The project has also engendered protests, first in the Cuzco Region then in the Caylloma Province, the last one involving strikes and demands for better conditions in places where the Majes-Siguas project is being built.
