= Mantarō =

- Gender: Male

Origin
- Origin: Japanese
- Meaning: Different meanings depending on the kanji used

Mantarō, Mantaro or Mantarou (written: 萬太郎 or 万太郎) is a masculine Japanese given name. Notable people with the name include:

- Hashimoto Mantaro (橋本 萬太郎) (1932–1987), Japanese linguist and sinologist
- Mantarō Kubota (久保田 万太郎) (1889–1963), Japanese writer, playwright and poet

Fictional characters:

- Mantaro Kinniku (キン肉 万太郎), protagonist of the manga series Kinnikuman Nisei
- Big Man of Deep Cut, an idol group from Splatoon
