= Cairahuiri =

Mountain in Peru

- Location within Peru

Highest point
- Elevation: 5,000 m (16,000 ft)
- Coordinates: 15°24′07″S 71°52′53″W

Naming
- Language of name: Aymara

Geography
- Location: Peru, Arequipa Region, Caylloma Province
- Parent range: Andes, Chila

Cairahuiri (possibly from Aymara and Quechua k'ayra frog) is a mountain in the Chila mountain range in the Andes of Peru, about 5,000 metres (16,404 ft) high. It is situated in the Arequipa Region, Caylloma Province, Tapay District. Cairahuiri lies southwest of Minasnioc, northwest of Surihuiri and Minaspata, northeast of Huaillaccocha and west of Huallatane. It stretches along the Cairahuiri River whose waters flow to the Molloco River in the west, a right affluent of the Colca River.
