= Colquere (Arequipa) =

Mountain in Peru

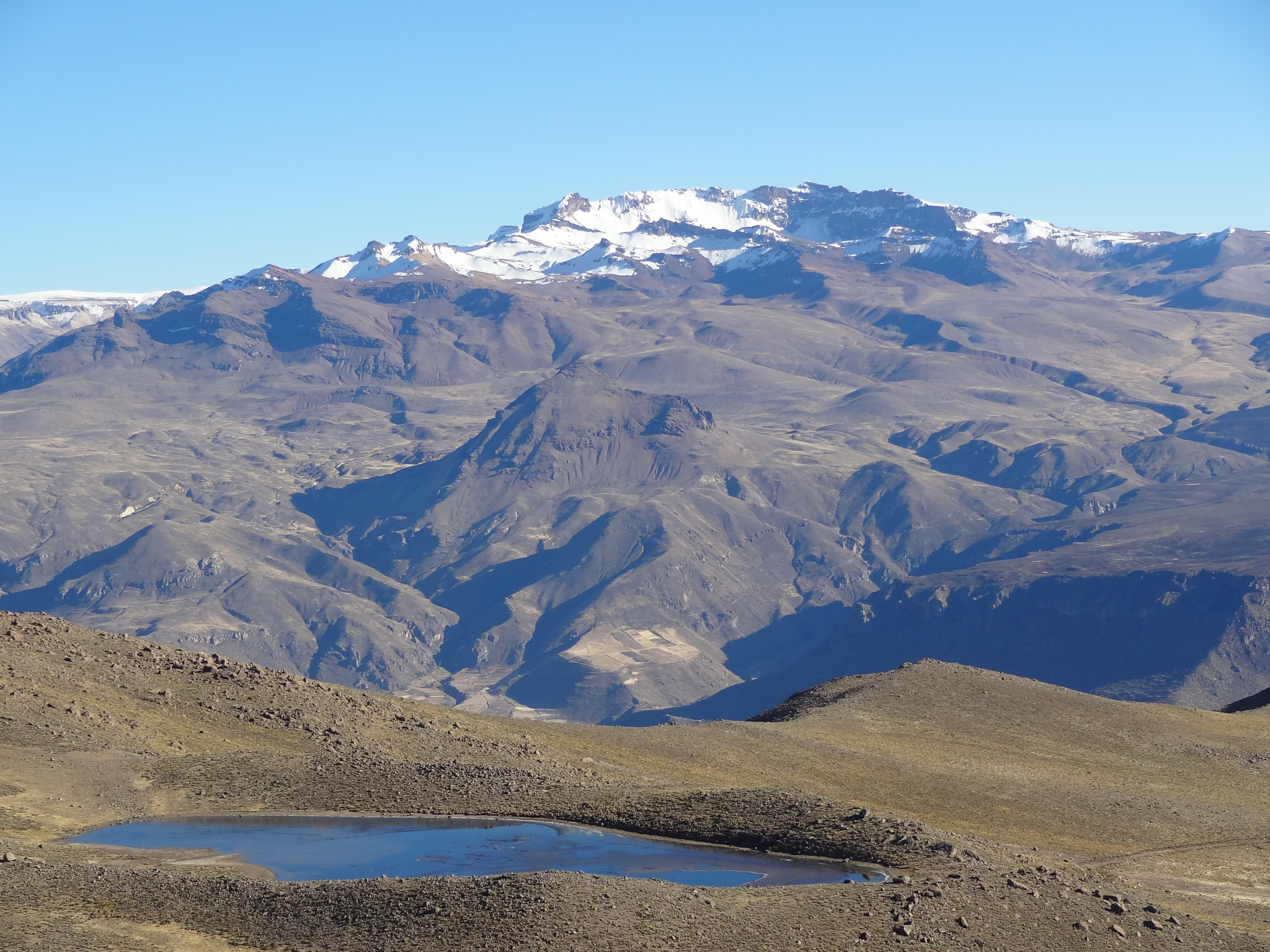
- The mountain Mismi as seen from the south-east near the lake Lima cota. Colquere is on the ridge south of Mismi (on the left, snow-covered).

Highest point
- Elevation: 5,200 m (17,100 ft)
- Coordinates: 15°32′50.2″S 71°41′15.8″W

Naming
- Language of name: Aymara

Geography
- Location within Peru
- Location: Peru, Arequipa Region, Caylloma Province
- Parent range: Andes, Chila

Colquere (possibly from Aymara qullqi silver, -ri a suffix, "the one with silver") is a mountain in the Chila mountain range in the Andes of Peru, about 5,200 metres (17,060 ft) high. It is situated in the Arequipa Region, Caylloma Province, on the border of the districts Ichupampa and Coporaque. Colquere lies south of Mismi and north of Humajala, west of the Cantumayo valley.
