= Chunkara =

Chunkara (Aymara for "pointed mountain", hispanicized spellings Chuncara, Chuncará, Chungara, Chungará) may refer to:

- Chunkara (Arequipa), a mountain in the Arequipa Region, Peru
- Chunkara (Bolivia), a mountain in Bolivia
- Chunkara (Puno), a mountain in the Puno Region, Peru
- Chungará (journal), a Chilean academic journal
- Chungará Lake, a lake in Chile

== See also ==
- Chungara–Tambo Quemado
- Chunkarani
- Hatun Chunkara
