= Minasnioc (Caylloma) =

Mountain in Peru

- Location within Peru

Highest point
- Elevation: 5,000 m (16,000 ft)
- Coordinates: 15°23′46″S 71°51′59″W

Geography
- Location: Peru, Arequipa Region, Caylloma Province
- Parent range: Andes, Chila

Minasnioc (Spanish minas mines, Quechua -ni, -yuq suffixes, "the one with mines") is a mountain in the north of the Chila mountain range in the Andes of Peru, about 5,000 metres (16,404 ft) high. It is situated in the Arequipa Region, Caylloma Province, on the border of the districts Caylloma and Tapay. It lies north of Surihuiri and Minaspata and northeast of the mountain named Huaillaccocha and Huallatane.
