= Huancaitira =

Mountain in Peru

- Location within Peru

Highest point
- Elevation: 4,800 m (15,700 ft)
- Coordinates: 15°27′13″S 71°57′20″W

Naming
- Language of name: Aymara

Geography
- Location: Peru, Arequipa Region, Caylloma Province
- Parent range: Andes, Chila

Huancaitira (possibly from Quechua, possibly from wanqhay to throw down, t'ira twin) is a mountain in the Chila mountain range in the Andes of Peru, about 4,800 metres (15,748 ft) high. It is situated in the Arequipa Region, Caylloma Province, Tapay District. It lies northwest of Surihuiri.
