= Ticlla (Caylloma-Tuti) =

Mountain in Peru

- Location within Peru

Highest point
- Elevation: 5,072 m (16,640 ft)
- Coordinates: 15°24′27″S 71°36′41″W

Naming
- Language of name: Quechua

Geography
- Location: Peru, Arequipa Region
- Parent range: Andes, Chila

Ticlla (possibly from Quechua for eyelash; two-colored or for 'with alternating colors') is a 5,072-metre-high (16,640 ft) mountain in the Chila mountain range in the Andes of Peru. It is located in the Arequipa Region, Caylloma Province, on the border of the districts of Caylloma and Tuti. Ticlla lies southwest of Jatunchungara and Chungara.
