= Huambo, Arequipa =

Huambo
- Town
- Location within Peru
- Coordinates: 15°44′27″S 72°07′17″W
- Country: Peru
- Region: Arequipa
- Province: Caylloma
- District: Huambo

Government
  - Mayor: Prof. Percy Pizango Grandez
- Elevation: 3,650 m (11,980 ft)
- Time zone: UTC-5 (PET)
- Website: www.huambo-colca.com

Huambo is a town in southern Peru, capital of the district Huambo in the province Caylloma in the Arequipa region.
