= Tapay =

Tapay can refer to:

- Tapai (also spelled tapay or tape), traditional fermented rice or rice wine in Austronesian cultures
- Tapuy, a fermented rice wine from the Luzon highlands in the Philippines
- Tapay District, a district in the province of Caylloma, Peru
