= Chuqi Pirwa (disambiguation) =

Chuqi Pirwa (Aymara chuqi gold, pirwa, piwra granary, Quechua chuqi, metal, every kind of precious metal; gold (<Aymara), pirwa deposit, "gold granary" or "metal deposit", Hispanicized spellings Choque Pirhua, Choquepirhua, Chuquipirhua) may refer to:

- Chuqi Pirwa (Arequipa), a mountain in the Arequipa Region, Peru
- Chuqi Pirwa (Arequipa-Cusco), a mountain on the border of the Arequipa Region and the Cusco Region, Peru
- Chuqi Pirwa (Cusco-Puno), a mountain on the border of the Cusco Region and the Puno Region, Peru
