= Pucara (Lari) =

Mountain in Peru

- Location within Peru

Highest point
- Elevation: 5,000 m (16,000 ft)
- Coordinates: 15°24′56″S 71°39′7″W

Naming
- Language of name: Quechua

Geography
- Location: Peru, Arequipa Region, Caylloma Province
- Parent range: Andes, Chila

Pucara (possibly from Aymara and Quechua for fortress) is a mountain in the Chila mountain range in the Andes of Peru, about 5,000 metres (16,404 ft) high. It is situated in the Arequipa Region, Caylloma Province, on the border of the districts Caylloma, Lari and Tuti. Pucara lies north-east of the mountain Mismi and east of the mountain Chuaña.
