= Tuti District =

Coordinates: 15.5322°S 71.5509°W

Tuti
- District
- Interactive map of Tuti
- Country: Peru
- Region: Arequipa
- Province: Caylloma
- Capital: Tuti

Government
  - Mayor: Yoni Yanque Cusi

Area
  - Total: 241.89 km^{2} (93.39 sq mi)
- Elevation: 3,790 m (12,430 ft)

Population (2005 census)
  - Total: 1,011
  - Density: 4.180/km^{2} (10.83/sq mi)
- Time zone: UTC-5 (PET)
- UBIGEO: 040518

Tuti District is one of twenty districts of the province Caylloma in Peru.

== Geography ==
The Ch'ila mountain range traverses the district. One of the highest elevations of the district is Mismi at 5,597 m (18,363 ft) above sea level. Other mountains are listed below:

- Aqu Kulluna
- Chunkara
- Chuqi Kuraw
- Hatun Siq'ita
- Kunturi
- Lluqu
- Misa Chunkara
- Pilluni
- Pukara
- Tiklla
- Wajchani
- Wankara

== Ethnic groups ==
The people in the district are mainly indigenous citizens of Quechua descent. Quechua is the language which the majority of the population (59.95%) learnt to speak in childhood, 39.93% of the residents started speaking using the Spanish language (2007 Peru Census).
