= Icho =

Icho or ICHO or IChO may refer to:

- International Chemistry Olympiad
- Kaori Icho (born 1984), Japanese freestyle wrestler
- Chiharu Icho, (born 1981), Japanese wrestler
- Icho Candy, Jamaican reggae singer
- Icho Ccollo, Hispanicized spelling of Jichu Qullu (disambiguation)
