= Wiswillani =

Mountain in Peru

- Q'asa
- Location within Peru

Highest point
- Elevation: 5,070.3 m (16,635 ft)
- Coordinates: 15°26′44″S 71°22′56″W

Geography
- Location: Peru, Arequipa Region, Caylloma Province
- Parent range: Andes

Wiswillani (Hispanicized spellings Huishuillane, Huishuillani, erroneously also Huishillani) or Q'asa (Quechua for mountain pass, Hispanicized spelling Ccasa) is a mountain in the Andes of Peru, about 5,070.3 metres (16,635 ft) high. It is situated in the Arequipa Region, Caylloma Province, on the border of the districts Tisco and Callalli. The mountain lies south of the lake Samaquta.

By the local people Wiswillani is venerated as an apu.
