= Parhuayane =

Mountain in Peru

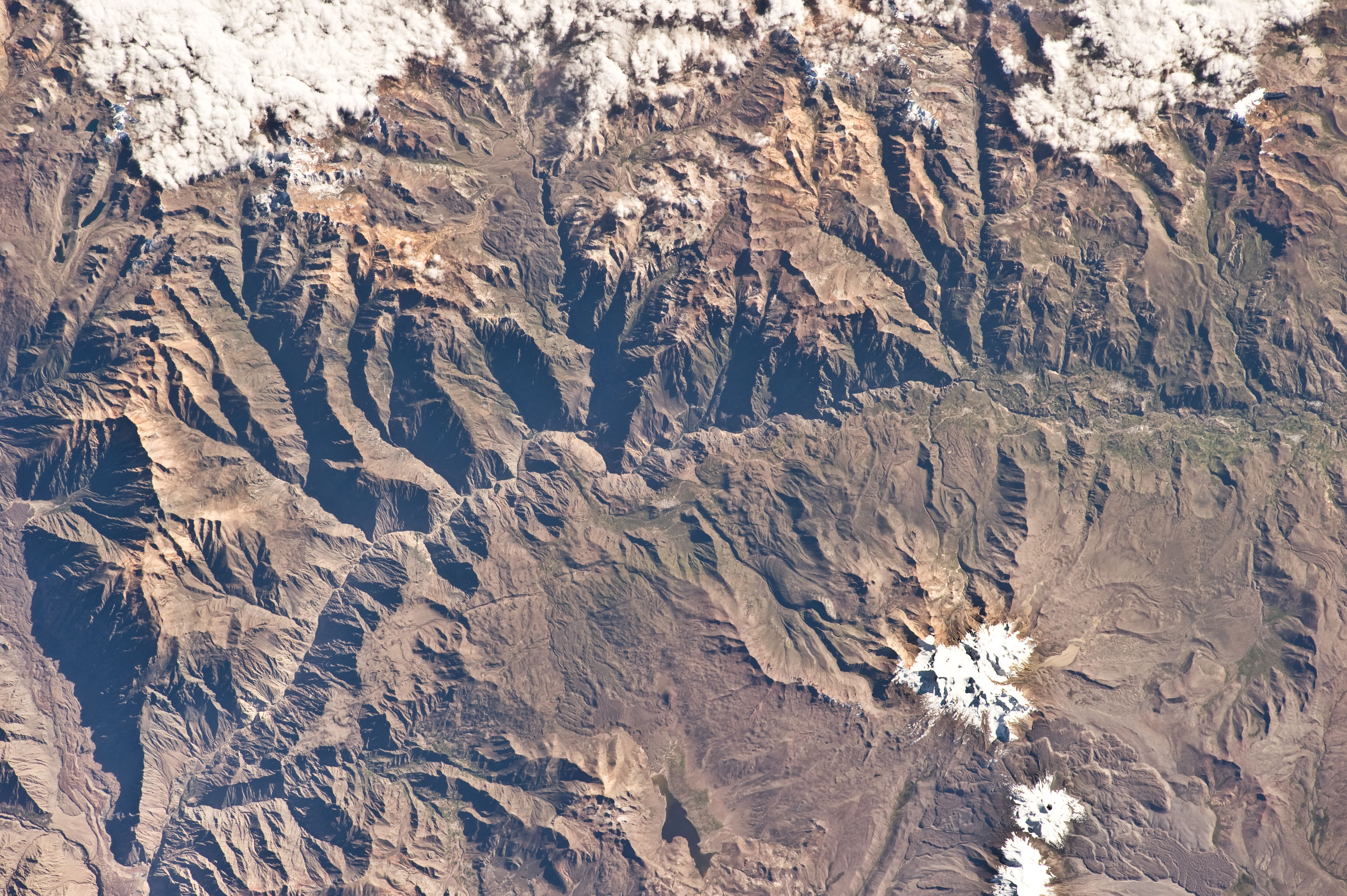
- The Colca River and Parhuayane north of it as seen from the ISS

Highest point
- Elevation: 5,100 m (16,700 ft)
- Coordinates: 15°29′09″S 71°51′44″W

Naming
- Language of name: Quechua

Geography
- Location within Peru
- Location: Peru, Arequipa Region
- Parent range: Andes, Chila

Parhuayane (possibly from Aymara parwaya a plant of the Deyeuxia family, -ni a suffix to indicate ownership, "the one with the parwaya plant") is a mountain in the Chila mountain range in the Andes of Peru, about 5,100 m (16,700 ft) high. It is located in the Arequipa Region, Caylloma Province, Madrigal District. Parhuayane lies southeast of Minaspata and Surihuiri.
