= Chuqi Pirwa (Arequipa-Cusco) =

Mountain in Peru

- Location within Peru

Highest point
- Elevation: 4,800 m (15,700 ft)
- Coordinates: 15°02′35″S 71°23′56″W

Naming
- Language of name: Aymara

Geography
- Location: Peru, Arequipa Region, Cusco Region
- Parent range: Andes

Chuqi Pirwa (Aymara chuqi gold, pirwa, piwra granary, Quechua chuqi, metal, every kind of precious metal; gold (<Aymara), pirwa deposit, "gold granary" or "metal deposit", Hispanicized spelling Choque Pirhua) is a mountain in the Andes of Peru, about 4,800 m (15,700 ft) high. It is located in the Arequipa Region, Caylloma Province, Tisco District, and in the Espinar Province, Yauri District. It lies northeast of Jañuma Pirwa and east of Pirwa.

The Pirwamayu (Quechua for "granary river") originates west of the mountain. It flows to the southwest and south as a right affluent of the Qullqa River.
