= Ajo Colluna =

Mountain in Peru

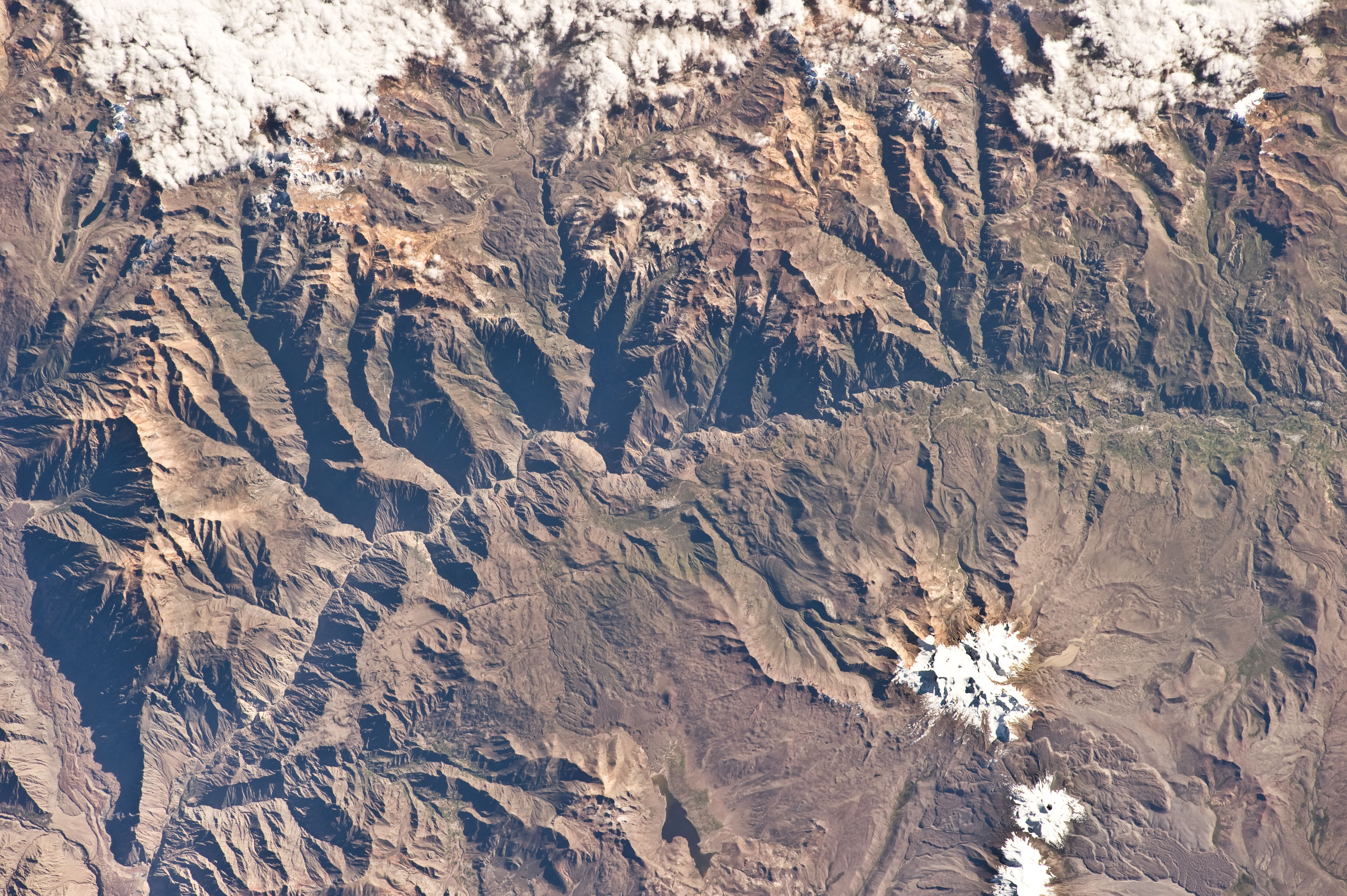
- The Colca River as seen from the ISS. Ajo Colluna in the upper right edge of this image is hidden beneath a cloud.

Highest point
- Elevation: 5,255 m (17,241 ft)
- Coordinates: 15°29′33″S 71°40′29″W

Naming
- Language of name: Quechua

Geography
- Location within Peru
- Location: Peru, Arequipa Region
- Parent range: Andes, Chila

Ajo Colluna (possibly from Quechua aqu sand, kulluna washbowl; silo, "sand bowl" or "sand silo") is a 5,255-metre-high (17,241 ft) mountain in the Chila mountain range in the Andes of Peru. It is located in the Arequipa Region, Caylloma Province, on the border of the districts of Lari and Tuti. It lies northeast of Quehuisha and Mismi.
