= Anqasi (disambiguation) =

Anqasi (Quechua for cobalt salt, Hispanicized spellings Ancasi, Anccase, Anccasi, Angasi) may refer to:

- Anqasi, a mountain in the La Unión Province, Arequipa Region, Peru
- Anqasi (Ayacucho), a mountain in the Ayacucho Region, Peru
- Anqasi (Caylloma), a mountain in the Caylloma Province, Arequipa Region, Peru
