= Lari District =

Coordinates: 15.6214°S 71.7738°W

Lari
- District
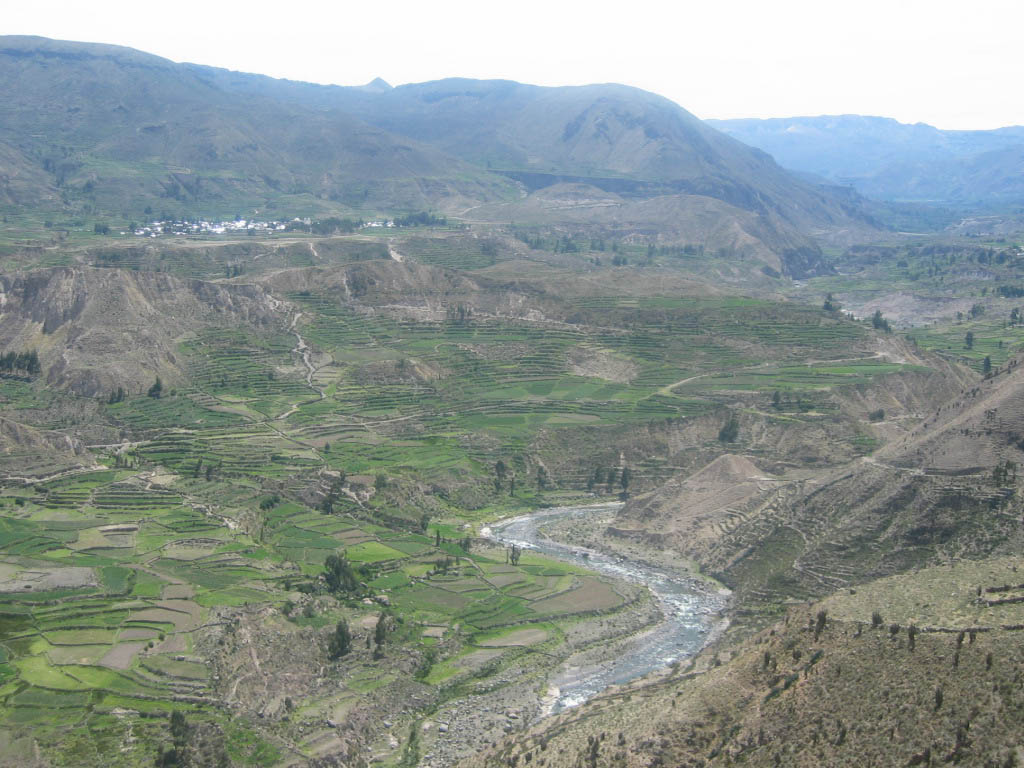
- Colca River with the village of Lari in the background
- Interactive map of Lari
- Country: Peru
- Region: Arequipa
- Province: Caylloma
- Capital: Lari

Government
  - Mayor: Abel Abdon Llallacachi Silloca

Area
  - Total: 384.02 km^{2} (148.27 sq mi)
- Elevation: 3,330 m (10,930 ft)

Population (2005 census)
  - Total: 1,370
  - Density: 3.57/km^{2} (9.24/sq mi)
- Time zone: UTC-5 (PET)
- UBIGEO: 040510

Lari District is one of twenty districts of the province Caylloma in Peru.

== Geography ==
The Ch'ila mountain range traverses the district. One of the highest elevations of the district is Mismi at 5,597 m (18,363 ft) above sea level. Other mountains are listed below:

- Aqu Kulluna
- Chulluqani
- Ch'uwaña
- Hatun Pila
- Kiwicha
- Minaspata
- Pukara
- Sillani
- Suriwiri
- Tiklla
- Wiska Wiska

== Images ==
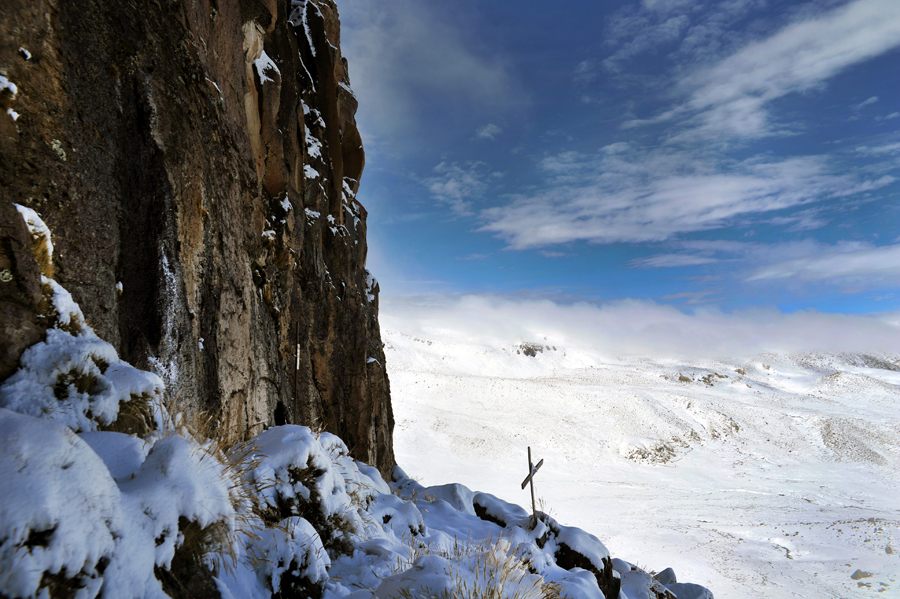
Mismi on the border of the districts of Lari and Ichupampa

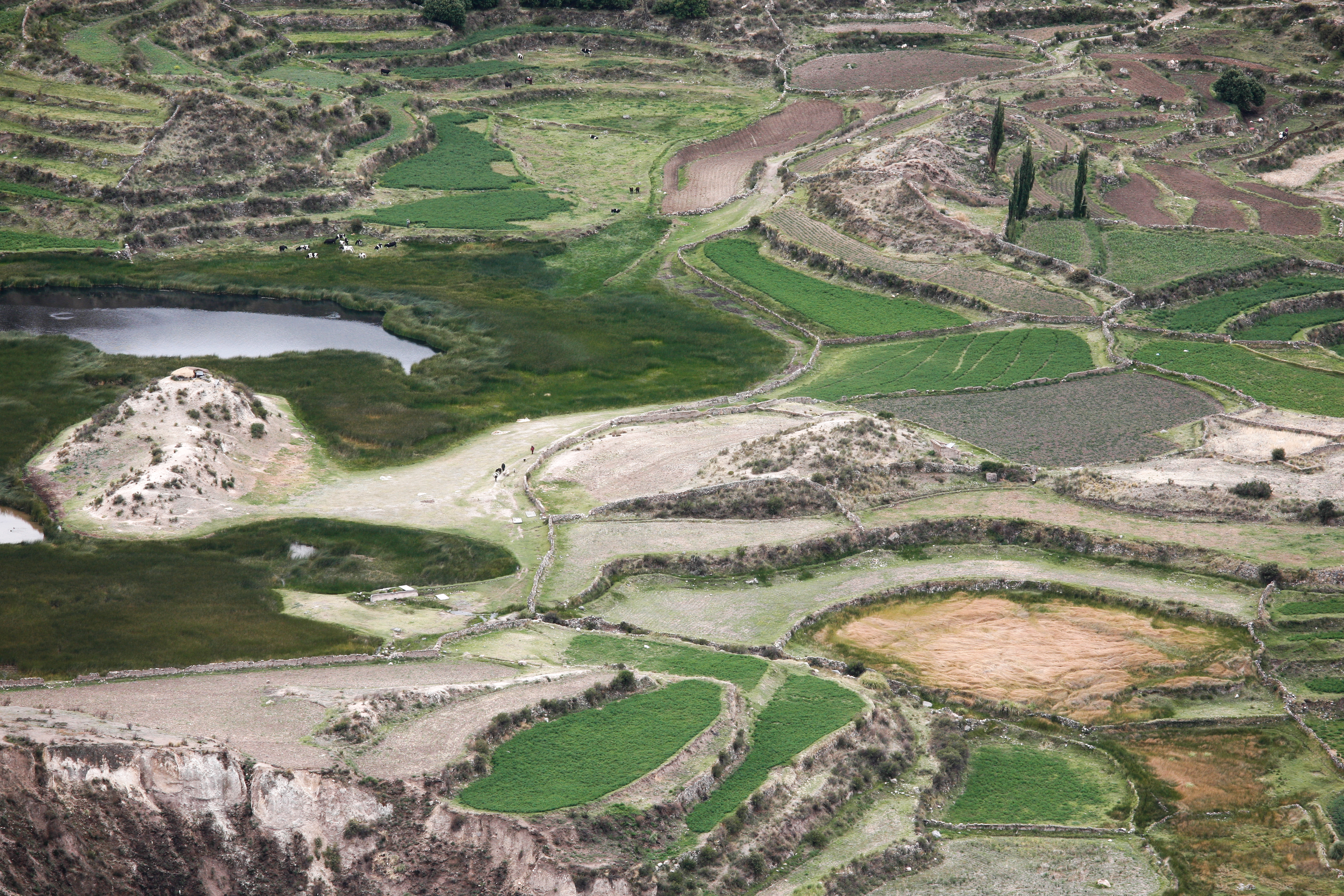
Fields at the Colca River in the Lari District

== See also ==
- Qallumayu
