= Coporaque District =

Coporaque District may refer to:

- Coporaque District, Caylloma in Peru
- Coporaque District, Espinar in Peru
