= Chuaña (Lari) =

Mountain in Peru

- Location within Peru

Highest point
- Elevation: 5,108.1 m (16,759 ft)
- Coordinates: 15°24′42″S 71°43′54.5″W

Geography
- Location: Peru, Arequipa Region, Caylloma Province, Lari District
- Parent range: Andes, Chila

Chuaña (possibly from Aymara for oozing of water and other liquids / melting of metals and other things) is a mountain in the Chila mountain range in the Andes of Peru, about 5,108.1 metres (16,759 ft) high. It is situated in the Arequipa Region, Caylloma Province, Lari District. Chuaña lies north of Quehuisha and Mismi and west of Pucara. The lake Carhuacocha (possibly from Quechua for "yellowish lake") lies at its feet.
