= Jichu Qullu =

Jichu Qullu (Aymara jichu, wichhu Peruvian feather grass (stipa ichu), qullu mountain, "stipa ichu mountain", also spelled Hichocollo, Icho Ccollo, Ichu Khollu, Ichu Kkollu, Ichocollo, Ichuccollu, Ichucollo, Jichu Kkollu, Jichuccollo) may refer to:

- Jichu Qullu (Bolivia-Peru), a mountain at the border of Bolivia and Peru
- Jichu Qullu (Peru), a mountain in the Moquegua Region, Peru
- Jichu Qullu (San Antonio de Chuca), a mountain in the San Antonio de Chuca District, Caylloma Province, Arequipa Region, Peru
- Jichu Qullu (Tacna), a mountain in the Tacna Region, Peru
- Jichu Qullu (Tapay), a mountain in the Tapay District, Caylloma Province, Arequipa Region, Peru
- Jichu Qullu (Tarucani), a mountain in the Tarucani District, Arequipa Province, Arequipa Region, Peru

== See also ==
- Wichhu Qullu (disambiguation)
