= Cantumayo =

River in Peru

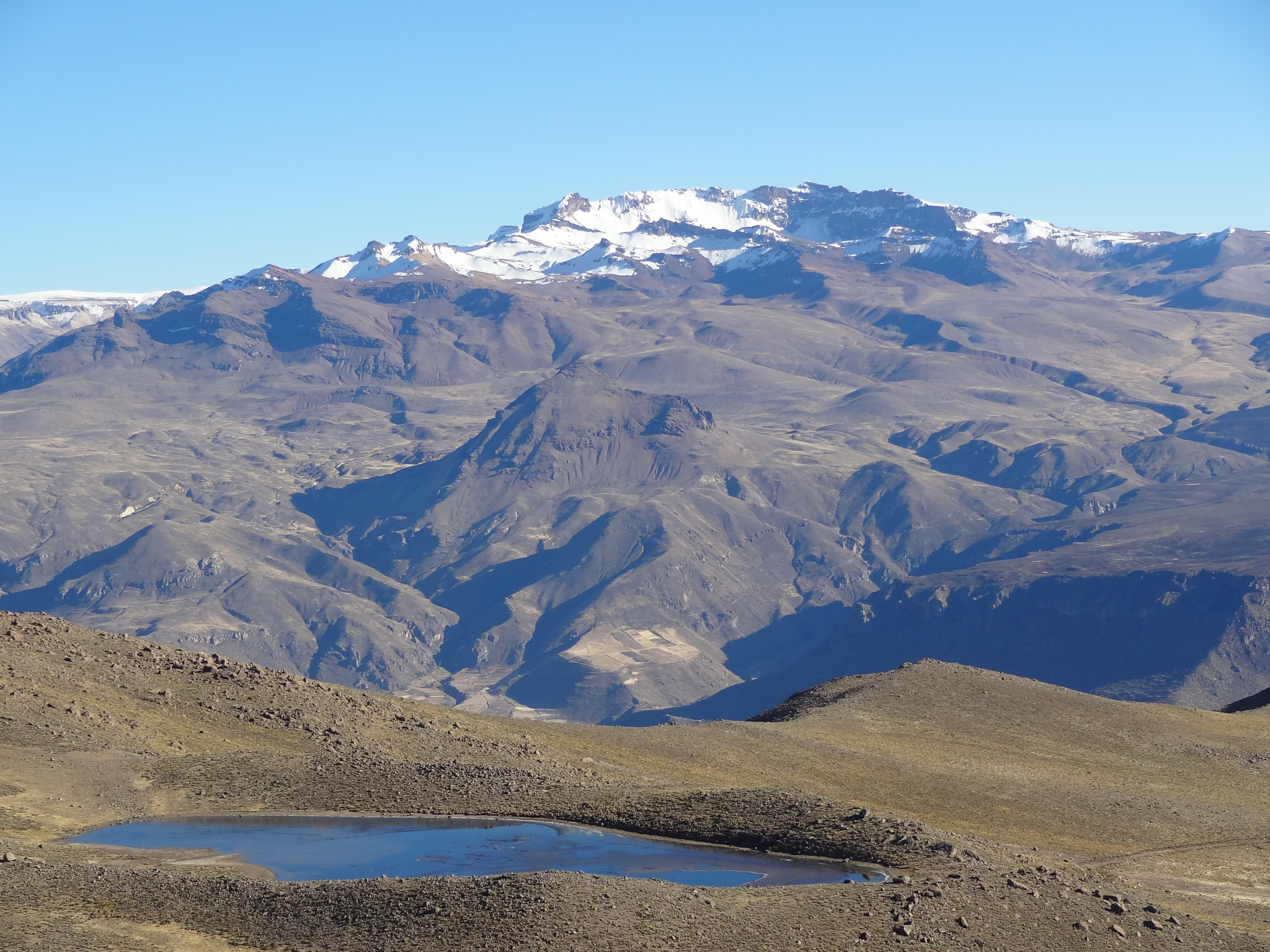
- The mountain Mismi as seen from the southeast near the lake Limacota. The Cantumayo valley is visible on the right side.
- Etymology: Quechua

Location
- Country: Peru
- Region: Arequipa Region

Physical characteristics
- Mouth: Colca River

Cantumayo (possibly from Quechua qantu, qantus, qantuta a plant (Cantua buxifolia), mayu river,) is a river in Peru located in the Arequipa Region, Caylloma Province, Coporaque District. It originates in the Chila mountain range southeast of the mountain Mismi. Its direction is mainly to the south where it meets Colca River as a right affluent. The confluence is north of the town Coporaque.
