= Madrigal District =

Coordinates: 15.6085°S 71.8104°W

Madrigal
- District
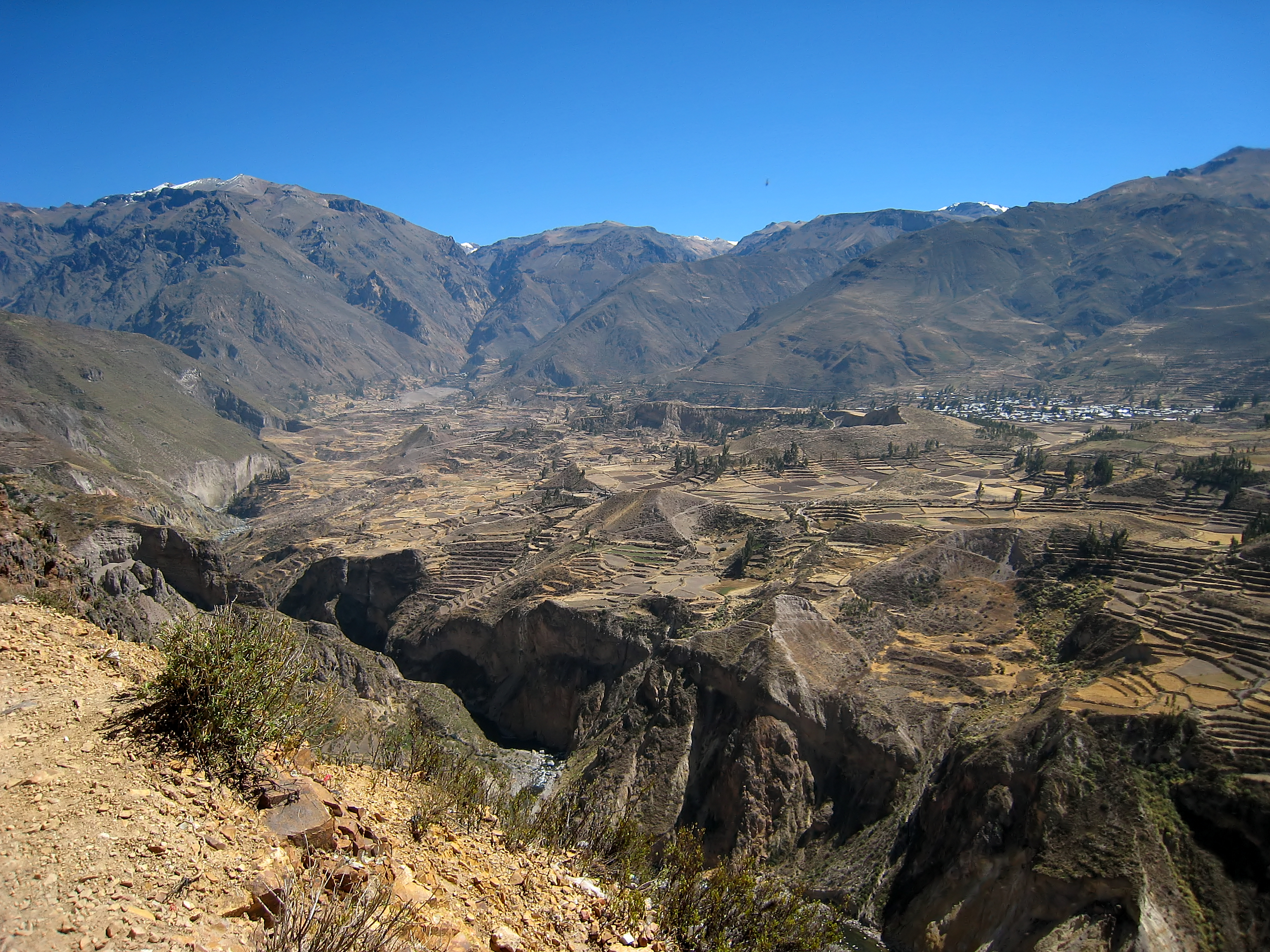
- Madrigal
- Interactive map of Madrigal
- Country: Peru
- Region: Arequipa
- Province: Caylloma
- Capital: Madrigal

Government
  - Mayor: Niceforo Cirilo Condori Huanqui

Area
  - Total: 160.09 km^{2} (61.81 sq mi)
- Elevation: 3,262 m (10,702 ft)

Population (2005 census)
  - Total: 827
  - Density: 5.17/km^{2} (13.4/sq mi)
- Time zone: UTC-5 (PET)
- UBIGEO: 040513

Madrigal District is one of twenty districts of the province Caylloma in Peru.

== Geography ==
The Ch'ila mountain range traverses the district. One of the highest mountains of the district is Suriwiri. Other mountains are listed below:

- Hatun Pila
- Jichu Qullu
- Parwayani
- Sillani
- Suriwiri

Madrigal lies north of the Colca valley.

== Ethnic groups ==
The people in the district are mainly indigenous citizens of Quechua descent. Quechua is the language which the majority of the population (56.78%) learnt to speak in childhood, 42.92% of the residents started speaking using the Spanish language (2007 Peru Census).
