= Lluta District =

Coordinates: 16.0155°S 72.0170°W

Lluta
- District
- Interactive map of Lluta
- Country: Peru
- Region: Arequipa
- Province: Caylloma
- Capital: Lluta

Government
  - Mayor: Jacinto Leodor Neyra Jacobo

Area
  - Total: 1,226.46 km^{2} (473.54 sq mi)
- Elevation: 3,000 m (9,800 ft)

Population (2005 census)
  - Total: 1,859
  - Density: 1.516/km^{2} (3.926/sq mi)
- Time zone: UTC-5 (PET)
- UBIGEO: 040511

Lluta District is one of twenty districts of the Caylloma Province in Peru.

== Geography ==
The highest peaks of the district is Ampato (Jamp'atu) at 6,288 m (20,630 ft). Other mountains are listed below:

- Aqu Pukyu
- Chawpi Wasi
- Chiri Yaku
- Jichu Qullu
- Iru Pata
- Kuntur
- Kunturi
- Pallqa
- Paxsi
- Pisqu P'unqu
- Pukarilla
- Qala
- Q'achi Q'achi
- Siraq
- Tarujani
- Tawrisma
- Tinku
- T'astayuq Muqu
- T'uturayuq
- Urquña
- Warkhu
- Yana Qaqa
- Yawri Chuku
- Yuraq Muqu
