= Pirwa (Peru) =

Mountain in Peru

- Location within Peru

Highest point
- Elevation: 5,000 m (16,000 ft)
- Coordinates: 15°02′36″S 71°26′33″W

Naming
- Language of name: Aymara

Geography
- Location: Peru, Arequipa Region
- Parent range: Andes

Pirwa (Aymara and Quechua for granary, deposit, Hispanicized spelling Pirhua) is a mountain in the Andes of Peru, about 5,125 m (16,814 ft) high. It is located in the Arequipa Region, Caylloma Province, Tisco District. It lies northwest of Jañuma Pirwa.

Two intermittent streams named Nañuma ("slim water") and Wiluma ("red water") originate south of the mountain. They flow to the Pirwamayu in the south. The Pirwamayu (Quechua for "granary river") is a right affluent of the Qullqa River.
