= Wichhu Qullu =

Wichhu Qullu (Aymara jichu, wichhu a kind of grass (stipa ichu), qullu mountain, "stipa ichu mountain", also spelled Huichu Kkollu, Huichocollo, Wichocollo, Wichu Kkollu, Wichukkollu) may refer to:

- Wichhu Qullu (Cercado), a mountain in the Cercado Province, Oruro Department, Bolivia
- Wichhu Qullu (Cochabamba), a mountain in the Cochabamba Department, Bolivia
- Wichhu Qullu (Sajama), a mountain in the Sajama Province, Oruro Department, Bolivia

== See also ==
- Jichu Qullu (disambiguation)
