= Sillane =

Mountain in Peru

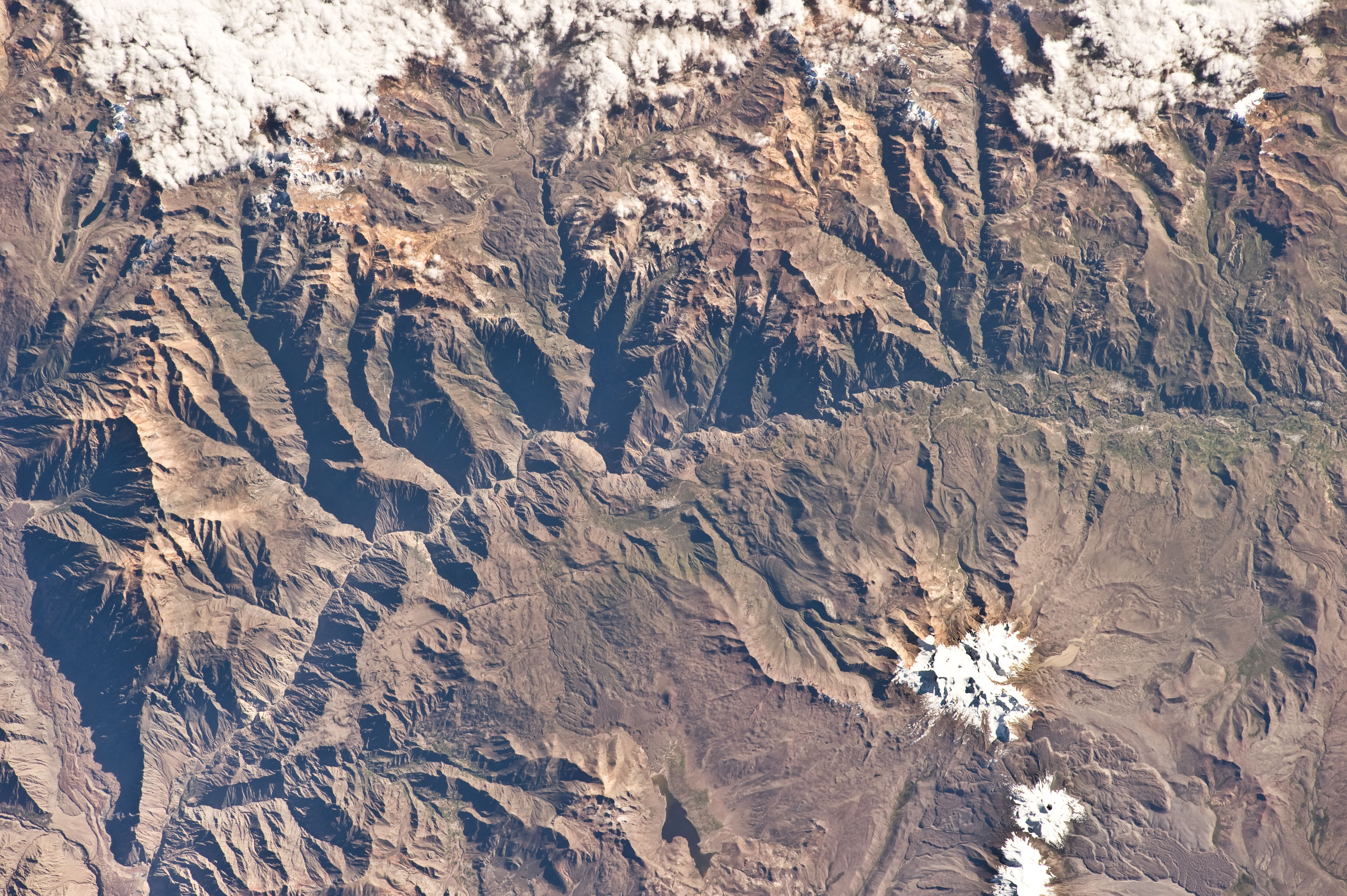
- The Colca River and Sillane north of it (center) as seen from the ISS

Highest point
- Elevation: 5,200 m (17,100 ft)
- Coordinates: 15°31′59″S 71°54′02″W

Naming
- Language of name: Aymara

Geography
- Location within Peru
- Location: Peru, Arequipa Region, Caylloma Province, Tapay District
- Parent range: Andes, Chila

Sillane (possibly from Aymara silla cane of maize, -ni a suffix, "the one with canes of maize") is a mountain in the Chila mountain range in the Andes of Peru which reaches a height of approximately 5,200 m (17,100 ft). It is located in the Arequipa Region, Caylloma Province, on the border of the districts of Madrigal and Tapay. Sillane lies north of the Colca River, northeast of the village of Tapay.
