= Huanca District =

Coordinates: 16.0325°S 71.8800°W

Huanca
- District
- Interactive map of Huanca
- Country: Peru
- Region: Arequipa
- Province: Caylloma
- Founded: February 14, 1927
- Capital: Huanca

Government
  - Mayor: Edwin Daniel Teves Zapana

Area
  - Total: 391.16 km^{2} (151.03 sq mi)
- Elevation: 3,080 m (10,100 ft)

Population (2005 census)
  - Total: 1,919
  - Density: 4.906/km^{2} (12.71/sq mi)
- Time zone: UTC-5 (PET)
- UBIGEO: 040508

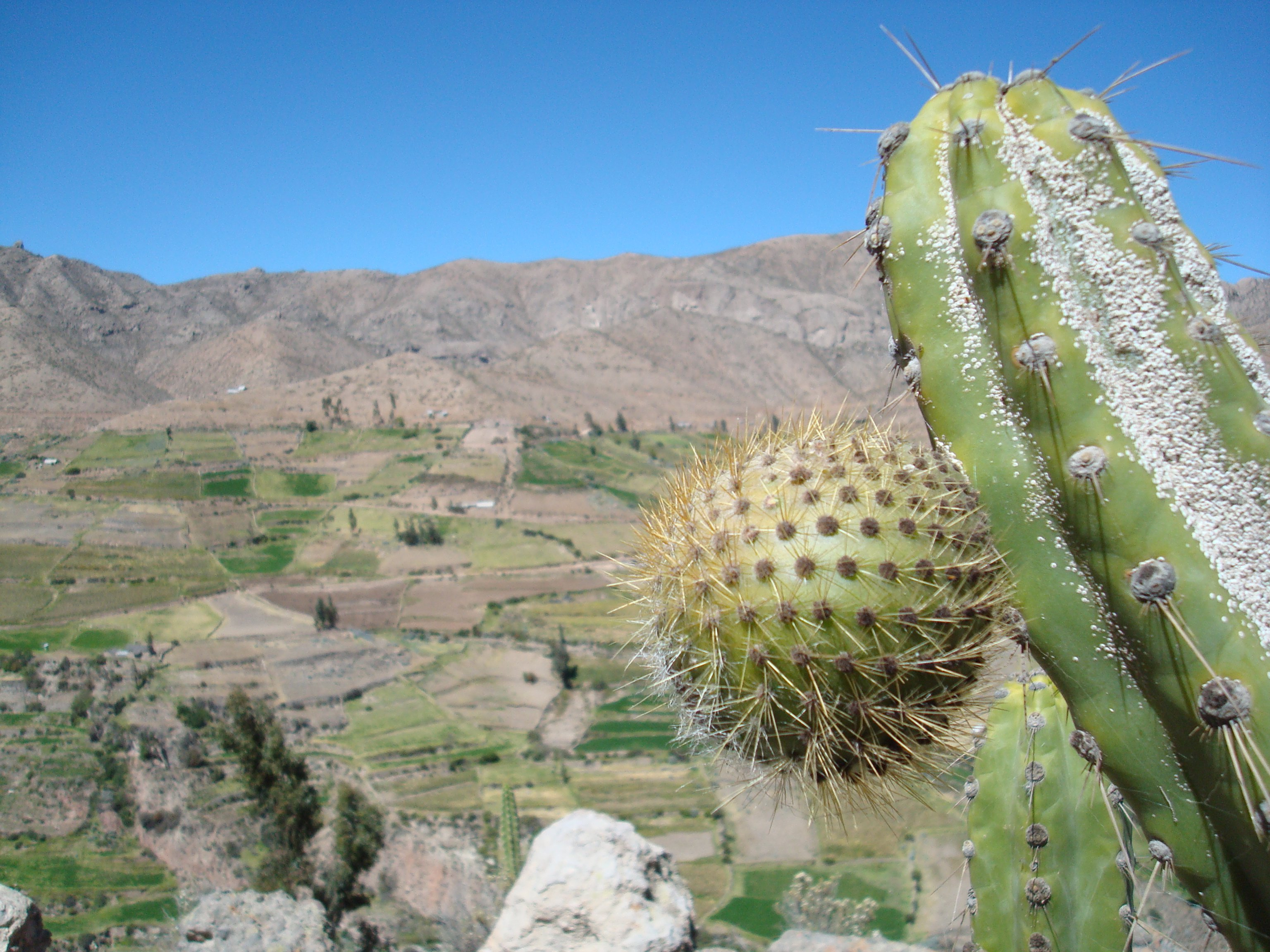

Huanca District is one of twenty districts of the province Caylloma in Peru. 1450 people live in Huanca District to status data as June 30, 2015 .

== See also ==
- Ch'uwaña
- Yuraq Apachita
