= San Antonio de Chuca District =

Coordinates: 15.9287°S 71.1086°W

San Antonio de Chuca
- District
- Interactive map of San Antonio de Chuca
- Country: Peru
- Region: Arequipa
- Province: Caylloma
- Founded: November 14, 1944
- Capital: San Antonio de Chuca

Government
  - Mayor: Ricardo Benito Tola Arhuiri

Area
  - Total: 1,531.27 km^{2} (591.23 sq mi)
- Elevation: 4,525 m (14,846 ft)

Population (2005 census)
  - Total: 1,155
  - Density: 0.7543/km^{2} (1.954/sq mi)
- Time zone: UTC-5 (PET)
- UBIGEO: 040514

San Antonio de Chuca District is one of twenty districts of the province Caylloma in Peru.

== Geography ==
One of the highest peaks of the district is Sullk'a Chuqa at about 5,200 m (17,100 ft). Other mountains are listed below:

- Allqamarini
- Anta Salla
- Anqasi
- Chullunkhäni
- Huch'uy Q'asa
- Iru Muqu
- Jayu Laqhi
- Jichu Qullu
- Karpa Muqu
- Kimsachata
- Kunturi
- Lawraq Muqu
- Llallawa
- Puka Urqu
- P'isaqani
- Salla P'ukuruyuq
- Saya Sirk'a
- T'ula Muqu
- Wanqani
- Wisk'achayuq
- Yana Salla
- Yana Surk'a
- Yaritani

== Ethnic groups ==
The people in the district are mainly indigenous citizens of Quechua descent. Quechua is the language which the majority of the population (72.68%) learnt to speak in childhood, 26.19% of the residents started speaking using the Spanish language (2007 Peru Census).
