= Chuaña (Huanca) =

Mountain in Peru

- Location within Peru

Highest point
- Elevation: 4,679.3 m (15,352 ft)
- Coordinates: 15°56′37″S 71°49′1″W

Geography
- Location: Peru, Arequipa Region, Caylloma Province
- Parent range: Andes

Chuaña (possibly from Aymara for oozing of water and other liquids / melting of metals and other things) is a mountain in the Andes of Peru, about 4,679.3 metres (15,352 ft) high. It is situated in the Arequipa Region, Caylloma Province, Huanca District. Chuaña lies south-east of the dormant volcano Ampato.

== See also ==
- Yurac Apacheta
