= South American Explorers =

Magazine publishing companies of the United States

South American Explorers, headquartered in Ithaca, New York, was a nonprofit travel, scientific, and educational organization founded in 1977. Its goals were advancing field exploration and research in South and Central America on subjects such as biology, geography, anthropology, and archaeology, and promoting field sports such as mountaineering, rafting, and caving.

The organization published the quarterly South American Explorer magazine, and sells maps, guidebooks, trip reports, and other materials. There are clubhouses for member use: Lima and Cuzco in Peru; Quito, Ecuador; and Buenos Aires, Argentina.

== Origins ==
South American Explorers was founded by journalist Donald James Montague as the South American Explorers Club in 1977. Before founding the organization, Montague did a stint in South Korea with the Peace Corps in the 1960s, then joined United Press International Television News (UPITN) as a New York City-based assignments editor. Linda Rosa claims to be co-founder and to have largely funded the initial enterprise. Tired of his desk job, Montague decided to organize a camera crew in South America because it was the source of the agency's "worst film," and he figured it would be easy to do better. The crew would consist of himself and two friends he'd met in South Korea, Jane Berger and Dale Forster.

The crew landed in Lima in 1971, not long after the 1970 Ancash earthquake. After filming a wide range of stories in Peru for UPITN and other organizations, they began covering events throughout South America, including Juan Perón's 1973 return to Argentina after 18 years of exile in Spain. Soon after, the camera crew shifted its base of operations to Buenos Aires, but when Peron died in 1974, the state-sponsored Dirty War made conditions particularly unsafe for journalists. Montague chose to disband the camera crew later that year and headed overland to Peru.

In Lima, Montague met with the Don Griffis, the business manager of the weekly Peruvian Times (then called the Lima Times because of conflicts with the military regime of Gen. Juan Velasco Alvarado). Montague proposed starting an "explorers club" and magazine, where the members would be the source of articles. Griffis wasn't convinced but offered Montague six months of "subsistence allowance" to see if the idea would take off. Back in the U.S. Montague and Rosa visited the New York Explorers Club, which was supportive of his venture but declined to offer reciprocal membership because the South American Explorers Club would accept women, while the New York Explorers Club did not at the time. In Washington, D.C., Montague enlisted the help of Linda Rosa, whom he had met in Guayaquil during a camera expedition with UPITN.

== Lima, Peru ==
In the summer of 1977 Montague and Rosa were back in Lima, and found offices at 146 avenue Portugal in the city's Breña neighborhood for the newly christened "South American Explorers Club" (SAEC). With the assistance of Teddy Ronalds, founder of the Las Dunas hotel in Ica, the SAE attracted a group of supporters that included businessman and collector Miguel Mujica Gallo, explorer John Hemming, horse breeder Fernando Graña, surfing pioneer Carlos Dogny, and Felipe Benavides, 1974 winner of the J. Paul Getty Award for Conservation Leadership. All became honorary founders of the SAEC. The club's advisory board included Washington Post foreign correspondent Joanne Omang, UPI journalist Daniel Doherty, and archaeologist Maria Reiche.

During the summer of 1977 the "South American Explorers Club" was formally established; memberships were pegged at $25, while subscriptions to its planned magazine would be $10. For the first issue Montague wanted to start off with "something big." After attending a gathering of Lima-based explorers, he spotted a curious detail on a NASA satellite photo released in 1976. This feature became the center of "The Dots of Pantiacolla," written under the pseudonym Ursula Thierman.

Located somewhat right of center, near the base of the central mountain range shown in this photo, is an amphitheater-shaped outcropping. The area circumscribed by this elliptical formation encompasses some three square kilometers. Within this oval are ten unexplained dots.... Exactly what they are is not known.

The article would launch several expeditions to the area. Present for the magazine's birth was author and adventurer Tim Cahill, who "assisted in putting out the first issue of the magazine by sitting around uselessly drinking innumerable bottles of Crystal beer." There was no advertising to speak of other than a few classifieds, which cost 2 cents a word, 50 words maximum. The completed magazine was set on the Linotype machines of the Lima Times and printed on their presses. The run was approximately 1,200 copies.

At the end of a six-month trial period the club had attracted only 87 members.

Three $500 life memberships would sign up over the coming years: Max Eiselin, a Swiss sporting-goods magnate and leader of the 1960 expedition that first ascended Dhaulagiri, seventh highest mountain in the world,, HRH Colonel Prince Chalermpol of Thailand, an orchid collector, when Rosa returned to Lima in the early 1980s to manage the clubhouse in the absence of Tom Jackson and James Hudnall, friend of Felipe Benevides, who was in Peru in 1977 as part of a Greenpeace whale Rescue crew escorted by Benevides.

The magazine published two more issues in Lima before funding ended, and Montague and Rosa transferred the organization's headquarters to the United States, to decrease postage costs and because free lodging in Denver, Colorado had been offered by Steve Morrow, UPI's Lima bureau chief.

== Denver, Colorado ==
Montague and Rosa arrived in Denver in late 1978 and soon found suitable offices at 2239 East Colfax Avenue, at the intersection of York Street. The building, offered a low-rent refuge to a number of progressive organizations, including Friends of the Earth, the Sierra Club, the Colorado Open Space Council, and the "Institute for Radical Studies," all in warren-like spaces over the "New Yorker" bar. A 1979 article in the Rocky Mountain News, "Explorer Club Cuts Red Tape by Getting Out of Peru," describes it as "a cramped office with scrounged equipment."

With Denver now the club's headquarters, the Lima clubhouse became a resource for members during their travels. They could leave get advice, leave bags, and read or write trip reports. While the Lima Times no longer supported the SAEC financially, they donated a small reference library to the clubhouse and Don Griffis's daughter Ellie provided occasional assistance. Club membership stood at 140.

The fourth issue of the South American Explorer, April 1979, was the first published in the United States. Articles included "Jungle Pharmacy," by Nicole Maxwell, author of the 1961 book Witch Doctor's Apprentice. Don Montague contributed an article under the pseudonym Ursula Thiermann" wherein he proposed a solution to the mysterious Dots of Pantiacolla.

In the fifth magazine, dated December 1979, alpinist and double-amputee Norman Croucher talked about the thermal advantages of not having lower legs during high-altitude ascents. Dan Buck, former assistant to U.S. representative Patricia Schroeder, contributed an article titled "The Trek to Chavin."

When the 1980s dawned, the club finally turned out its sixth "quarterly" magazine — two issues a year over three years of life. Explorer Robert Randall offered the humor-filled "Tales of the Tiger," and Neil Gow wrote about Peru's "Golden Age of Guano." Dan Buck offered a history of the South American Handbook.

By this time the club had begun to attract mainstream attention. The Denver Post published an extensive article, "Magazine Introduces Continent to Readers." Tim Cahill, present at the club's dawn in Lima, wrote "The Adventurer's Continent: The Rags-to-Rags Story of the South American Explorers Club" for Outside magazine. As the organization became better known, its stable of writers increased. In issue 8, Australian cartographer Kevin Healey wrote about mapping South America in "Carte Blanche." Anne Meadows, later the author of Digging Up Butch and Sundance, wrote "Better Pink than Extinct," about South American flamingos. And Honorary founder John Hemming, at the time director and secretary of the Royal Geographical Society, contributed "The Draining of Lake Guatavita," which was drawn from his book The Search for El Dorado.

In 1985 the organization moved to larger offices in what was then known as the John Hand Building, at 1510 York Street. By this time Ethel Green of the Lima Clubhouse moved to Denver to become the manager there, while Betsy Wagenhauser took over in Lima. During this time the organization and its magazine began to attract a wider range of writers, many early in their careers. These included Daniel Alarcón, who penned a corrosive article on Lima; Johan Reinhard, discoverer of the Mummy Juanita and winner of the Rolex Award; Easter Island expert Georgia Lee, D. Bruce Means, now president of the Coastal Plains Institute; Kim MacQuarrie, documentary filmmaker and author of Last Days of the Incas; and National Geographic photojournalist Loren McIntyre. Also found in the table of contents were Robert L. Carneiro, Nicolas Jaeger, Vince Lee, Kenneth R. Wright, Hugh Thompson, Mark Plotkin, Stewart D. Redwood, Hilary Bradt, and Paolo Greer.

During the time that the Shining Path was active in Peru, the SAEC served as a source of information about the safety of areas of the country. In 1989 they expanded outside Peru for the first time, opening a clubhouse in Quito, Ecuador.

== Ithaca, New York ==
In February 1992, the club moved its U.S. headquarters from Denver to Ithaca, New York. Montague cited numerous reasons for the shift, including his having been born in Duchess County, New York and the presence of a strong Latin American studies department at Cornell University, but a potentially decisive factor was that he "just didn't want to die in Denver." Montague left Denver over the strong objections of Rosa who just had a baby daughter Emily Rosa and could not easily leave her nursing job, telling her the move was to accommodate the wishes of his wife whose parents lived in Ithaca. Rosa thought it unwise to move to New York where the New York Explorers Club could finally sue the SAEC over its use of the term "Explorers Club," as they had once threatened in the past.

After Shining Path leader Abimael Guzmán was captured by Peruvian police in 1992, the country became safer to travel in. The club member and later novelist Kate Wheeler wrote a New York Times article about travel in Peru in 1994, something that would have been strongly discouraged not so long before. The South American Explorers Club has always urged responsible travel, and when ecotourism began to take off in the 1990s, it was a frequent source of information.

In 1999 the organization opened a second office in Peru, in Cuzco funded with special donations from SAEC members.

On February 8, 1999, the South American Explorers Club was sued by the New York Explorers Club in the Northern District court of New York. The accusation was "infringement by South American Explorers Club of various marks owned by the Explorers Club," although 20 years earlier the club had formed with the express consent of the Explorers Club. The lawsuit was prompted by sponsorship deals the Explorers Club was seeking to establish with American Express and other firms. On September 30, 1999, the South American Explorers Club signed an agreement with the New York Explorers Club and became South American Explorers.

While the organization is no called longer a "club," it still has "clubhouses" in South America. It was on this basis that it opened the Buenos Aires clubhouse in 2006. The first office on the east coast of South America, far from the organization's roots in Peru. Founded in 1977, when hot type was the state of the art, The group now maintains a website, publishes an online magazine, and continues its mission of advancing exploration and research as well as field sports in South and Central America.

The organization has no connection to the travel company called "South America Explorers" based in Florida.

== Clubhouses in South America ==
All three SAE offices are now closed. The Quito office appears to have closed sometime around 2014, following some administrative issues. The Lima and Cusco offices closed for "some re-engineering" in 2017, with the indication that they might reopen in future. The "virtual" clubhouse in Buenos Aires may still be functioning.

The now closed Lima clubhouse, the first in South America, was located at Calle Piura 135, Miraflores. The likewise closed Quito clubhouse, founded in 1989, was located in the La Mariscal neighborhood of Quito, at Jorge Washington E8-64 y Leonidas Plaza. The Buenos Aires clubhouse, founded in 2006, offers support services through Skype and email by staff based in the city.

== South American Explorer magazine ==
The SAE's magazine was produced quarterly, but given the club's shoestring budget and somewhat peripatetic nature, this was always goal rather than a promise. The key was that a membership lasted until four issues were received; until the fourth arrived, membership continued unabated, so in a certain sense it was advantages for members not to receive a magazine. The first magazine was published in 1977 and No. 95 in 2010, an average of just under three magazines per year. Membership is now done on a yearly basis and isn't keyed to magazine production.

Content is typically six to eight articles, book reviews, letters from members sometimes accompanied by dismissive responses, and a number of columns. These have included:

Club News and Ace of Clubs: Don Montague's tongue-in-cheek columns are written to the members of South American Explorers. The text alternates between boasts of the club's achievements, elaborate excuses for its supposed shortcomings, and contemptuous dismissals of members' complaints. When the organization opened multiple clubhouses in South America, the "Club News" column became a compendium for updates from all the clubhouses. Montague's column became "Ace of Clubs," even as the content and scathing erudition typically found there continued unabated.

No Bull: Written by William Hornyak under the nickname "Big Bill," this column described the author's fictional exploits and offered spoofy advice to would-be explorers. The second "No Bull" column was titled "Live to Tell the Tell the Tale":

"O.K., let's face it — killing is a damned dirty business. I don't care if you're scattergunning snowgeese, pestering ptarmigan or Bowie-knifing your way out of an anaconda straightjacket. It's all the same to me. Some people may call it sport, but sending triple-mushrooming .280-grain lead calling cards through every mildly misbehaving beast is a pretty disgusting pastime in my opinion. No wild creature I know of every looked better for a hollow-point bullet having passed through it at 3,200 feet per second [975.36 meters per second], and I doubt one ever will."

After lengthy discussions of how to dispatch wildlife large and small, Hornyak concludes with a warning from the "Jacques Cousteau Special Turtle Division" about the dangers of sleeping on a Galapagos beach in a plump sleeping bag, something that could "arouse potential assailants."

Part of the humor of "No Bull" was that each column was "part one," yet part two would never come. Instead, there would be a fresh series of outrages by the blithely destructive "Big Bill" in South America. An exception to this pattern was a faux telegraph that appeared in issue six, in which Hornyak asked the South American Explorers Club for support in a supposed plan to excavate Machu Picchu with copious amounts of high explosives.

No Comment: Started early in the magazine's history, the column served as a place for credulous wire stories about subjects such as the work of Erich von Däniken, a supposed "mystic civilization" near Punta Arenas, and monkey-shaped rock in a remote region of Peru that could represent work by a mysterious simian tribe. Unfortunately, the short articles tended to attract credulous awe rather than the intended derision. "No Comment" was terminated rather than allowing undeserving stories to gain wider traction.

== See also ==
- Royal Geographical Society
- National Geographic Society
- The Explorers Club
