= Lake Samaccota =

Lake in Arequipa, Peru

- Location within Peru
- Location: Peru; Arequipa Region, Caylloma Province
- Coordinates: 15°24′20″S 71°22′35″W

Lake Samaccota ((also known as Laguna Samaccota) possibly from Aymara sama color, quta lake) is a lake in Peru located in the Arequipa Region, Caylloma Province, Tisco District, northeast of the mountain named Palca. It's estimated terrain above sea level is 4601 meters.

== See also ==
- Wiswillani
