= Pukara, Coporaque =

Archaeological site in Peru

Pukara
- Location: Peru, Arequipa Region, Caylloma Province
- Region: Andes

Pukara (Aymara and Quechua for fortress) is an archaeological site in Peru. It is located in the Arequipa Region, Caylloma Province, Coporaque District. The ruins consisting of buildings, stone tombs (chullpa), deposits (qullqa) and walls lie on the left side of the road from Chivay to Coporaque.
