= Loren McIntyre =

American journalist

- Born: March 24, 1917; Seattle, Washington
- Status: Married
- Died: May 11, 2003 (aged 86); Arlington, Virginia
- Occupation: Photojournalist
- Notable credit(s): National Geographic, Time, Life, Smithsonian, Audubon
- Spouse: Sue Shelton McIntyre
- Children: G. Scott & Lance McIntyre

Loren McIntyre (March 24, 1917 – May 11, 2003), was an American photojournalist who worked extensively in South America. His photographs and writing appeared in National Geographic and hundreds of other periodicals. He has numerous books to his credit, including The Incredible Incas and Their Timeless Land (1975), Exploring South America (1990), Amazonia (1991), and Die Amerikanische Reise (2000)

== Early life ==
Loren Alexander McIntyre was born in Seattle, Washington in 1917, and grew up in Seattle's Seward Park neighborhood. It was there that he described first reading newspaper accounts of the Galapagos Islands and the disappearance of Colonel Percy Fawcett, the British explorer, in the jungles of Brazil. "The Sunday supplements had stories about whether or not he had become a white god there," McIntyre remembered in 1991, then in his 70s. McIntyre attended Seattle's Cleveland High School, and later graduated from the University of California, Berkeley, where he studied Latin American culture.

After his studies McIntyre joined the Merchant Marine, and when World War II broke out, he served for four years with the U.S. Navy in the Pacific theater. During his Merchant Marine and Naval careers, McIntyre circumnavigated the globe, visiting countries such as Japan, China, Manchuria, Singapore, India and Brazil. After the war, McIntyre was assigned to the Peruvian Navy as a gunnery adviser, retiring with the rank of captain.

McIntyre attended the Universidad San Marcos in Lima, Peru, where he studied ethnology and became fluent in both Spanish and Portuguese.

== Photojournalism ==
In the late 1950s and 1960s, while working for the US AID program in Peru and Bolivia, McIntyre began photographing his travels. His first article as a freelance photographer and writer was "Flamboyant Is the Word for Bolivia," published in National Geographic in 1966. The article featured 47 of McIntyre's photos.

Over the following years McIntyre's photos and articles would appear in more than 500 publications, including Time, Life, Smithsonian, GEO, Audubon, and South American Explorer. His first book was The Incredible Incas and Their Timeless Land (1975), which sold some 800,000 copies. Other books included Exploring South America (1990), a record of his many adventures in South America. He wrote and illustrated Amazonia (1991) for the Sierra Club, and a biography of Alexander von Humboldt, Die Amerikanische Reise (2000), published in Germany. McIntyre's travels also figured in Amazon Beaming (1991), by Petru Popescu. The book recounts McIntyre's capture by an "uncontacted" Indian tribe and his discovery of the source of the Amazon River. McIntyre was co-writer, co-producer and location adviser for the IMAX film Amazon, a 1997 Academy Award nominee for best documentary short.

In 2015-2016 British theatre company Complicité staged a one-person performance by Simon McBurney called The Encounter, which was based on the book "Amazon Beaming", about McIntyre becoming lost in the Javari Valley in Brazil and his experiences with locals. It has played to sold-out audiences in London.

A posthumous exhibition of McIntyre's photography, WESH "As Similar as Possible: The Portrait" ("'O Mais Parecido Possível: O Retrato"), was organized at the Pinacoteca in São Paulo, Brazil, from October 2012 to February 2013. Forty-nine of McIntyre's photographs appeared in the book that accompanied the exhibition, In the Jungle, One Afternoon (Na Floresta, Uma Tarde). They were selected by São Paulo-based photojournalist Roberto Linsker, who chose the photos from the photographer's archive of some 300,000 images.

== Discoverer of the furthermost source of the Amazon River ==
In 1971 the National Geographic Society sent a three-man expedition, headed by McIntyre, to locate the precise headwaters of the Amazon River. It was the brook named Carhuasanta located in the Apurímac Region of Peru, fed by the winter snows of the mountain Mismi (5,597 m), some 6,400 kilometers from the Atlantic Ocean. Of all the possible river sources in the Amazon Basin, it is the snow melt of the Carhuasanta that has been calculated by cartographers to be the furthermost water source from the mouth of the Amazon.

The expedition traveled from the mining town of Cailloma by four-wheel drive, then climbed the Apachita Trail and traversed onto Mismi, taking in Kiwicha and Puma Chiri. This is, as McIntyre describes it in his 1972 National Geographic article, "a semicircle rampart of the continental divide. All that trickles from the inner rim joins to form the Apurimac."

"On October 15, 1971, we reached an ice-edged ridge above Carhuasanta, longest of the five head-water brooks. The Indians call that 18,200 foot summit Choquecorao ... A thousand feet below the ridge we sighted a lake.... We clambered down to quench our thirsts.... Here at 17,220 feet was the farthest source of the mighty Amazon — more a pond than a lake, just a hundred feet across."

Now named Laguna McIntyre, the lake is deemed the river's "true source," as it is permanent. However, the source changes continuously over time because of shifts of the weather and its impact on the countless micro-climates of the region. In the wet season the mountains and altiplano are covered in snow; in the dry season it resembles a desert.

== Personal life ==
McIntyre lived with his wife Sue for many years in South America, primarily Peru. Together they raised two sons, Scott and Lance. At the end of his life, he lived in Arlington, Virginia and worked primarily in Brazil. He died in Arlington in 2003. He was survived by his wife, two sons, and two grandchildren.

== Bibliography ==
- The Incredible Incas and Their Timeless Land (1975)
- Exploring South America (1990)
- Amazonia (1991)
- Die Amerikanische Reise (2000)
