= Ichupampa District =

Coordinates: 15.6504°S 71.6892°W

Ichupampa
- District
- Interactive map of Ichupampa
- Country: Peru
- Region: Arequipa
- Province: Caylloma
- Capital: Ichupampa

Government
  - Mayor: Javier Sebastian Chullo Taco

Area
  - Total: 74.89 km^{2} (28.92 sq mi)
- Elevation: 3,400 m (11,200 ft)

Population (2005 census)
  - Total: 922
  - Density: 12.3/km^{2} (31.9/sq mi)
- Time zone: UTC-5 (PET)
- UBIGEO: 040509

Ichupampa District is one of twenty districts of the province Caylloma in Peru.

== Ethnic groups ==
The people in the district are mainly indigenous citizens of Quechua descent. Quechua is the language which the majority of the population (53.15%) learnt to speak in childhood, 46.43% of the residents started speaking using the Spanish language (2007 Peru Census).

== See also ==
- Ch'ila mountain range
- Qullqiri
