= Carhuasanta =

River in Peru

The Carhuasanta is a small river located in the Arequipa Region of Peru. It is known as the headwaters of the Amazon River. The brook is fed by the winter snows of Nevado Mismi (5,597 m), some 6,400 kilometers from the Atlantic Ocean. Of all the possible river sources in the Amazon Basin, it is the snow melt of the Carhuasanta that has been calculated by cartographers to be one of the furthest water sources from the mouth of the Amazon.

The Carhuasanta joins with the Quebrada Apacheta, becoming the Rio Lloqueta. The river has several more name changes before it becomes the Apurímac River. The mining town of Caylloma lies near the junction of four rivers that form the Apurímac river.

== National Geographic expedition ==
The National Geographic Society sent a three-man expedition to the region in 1971, headed by Loren McIntyre. The expedition travelled from Caylloma by four-wheel drive, but soon got bogged. Continuing on by backpacking up the river, they climbed up the Apacheta Trail and traversed onto the mountain Mismi, taking in the mountains Kiwicha and Pumachiri. This is, as McIntyre describes it in his 1972 National Geographic article, "a semicircle rampart of the continental divide. All that trickles from the inner rim joins to form the Apurimac."

On 15 October 1971, we reached an ice-edged ridge above Carhuasanta, longest of the five headwater brooks. The Indians call that 18,200 foot summit Choquecorao ... A thousand feet below the ridge we sighted a lake... We clambered down to quench our thirsts... Here at 17,220 ft/5,249m was the farthest source of the mighty Amazon - more a pond than a lake, just a hundred feet across.

Mismi makes an unreliable source of water in the dry season. Laguna McIntyre, as the lake was called, is deemed the 'true source', as it is permanent. However, it is known that the source will change over time, perhaps in a single season, due to the changes of the weather and its impact on the microclimate. In the wet season the mountains and undulating altiplano are covered in snow. In the dry season it resembles a desert.

== Other expeditions ==
=== Pre-1971 ===
Very few people have visited the headwaters of the Carhuasanta. A walking track called the Apacheta Trail, used by locals, runs across the continental divide 13 kilometers to the west of Mismi, linking the villages of the Colca Canyon to the isolated valleys of the altiplano used by alpaca herders and their families, and to the mining town of Caylloma, 60 km distant (which can be accessed by a road from another direction).

Mismi was frequented by the Incas. "A gold figurine was discovered in a pirqa (Quechua for "wall", here a burial pit) on the summit by a South African father and son who were working in the Colca Canyon in the early 1970s." They didn't seem to know of the significance of the mountain as the source of the mighty Amazon, nor of the interest invested in it by others in the decades before.

=== 1982 ===
The third team to reach the top of the Mismi, in search of the 'true source', was Jean-Michel Cousteau and his crew in 1982. McIntyre writes, "Despite support by a helicopter and a monstrous six-wheel truck carrying five tons of equipment, Jean-Michel and his puffing lowlanders barely made it to the top."

=== 1985 ===
In 1985 a five-man team from the Los Angeles Adventurers Club, led by the late Emil Barajak, erected a heavy iron cross at the source.

In the same year, a 9-member international team organized by South African Dr. Francois J. Odendaal climbed out of the Colca valley and hiked up the Apacheta Trail with grandiose and expensive plans to run the Amazon by raft and kayak all the way to the sea. The team was torn with dissension - not to say mutiny. Odendaal, a South African, pulled out after they reached flat water at Atalaya with 3600 miles/5,794 km yet to go. Only Polish Piotr Chmielinski and American Joe Kane completed the journey to the Atlantic with Kane documenting it in the classic book Running the Amazon (1989). Kane documents in his book that he hiked for an hour to the top of a mountain, off the Apacheta Trail, and "touched the source" (a frozen river of water).
