= Huaillaccocha =

Mountain in Peru

- Location within Peru

Highest point
- Elevation: 5,100 m (16,700 ft)
- Coordinates: 15°25′21″S 71°54′34″W

Naming
- Language of name: Aymara

Geography
- Location: Peru, Arequipa Region, Caylloma Province
- Parent range: Andes, Chila

Huaillaccocha (possibly from Quechua waylla meadow, qucha lake, "meadow lake") is a mountain in the Chila mountain range in the Andes of Peru, about 5,100 metres (16,732 ft) high. It is situated in the Arequipa Region, Caylloma Province, Tapay District. Huaillaccocha lies northwest of Surihuiri and Minaspata and southeast of Huallatane. The valley south of the mountain is named Kencohuaycco (possibly from Quechua for "zig-zag valley" or "zig-zag stream"). Its waters flow to the Molloco River, an affluent of the Colca River.
