= Jayu Laqhi =

Mountain in Peru

- Location within Peru

Highest point
- Elevation: 4,600 m (15,100 ft)
- Coordinates: 15°36′25″S 70°58′00″W

Geography
- Location: Peru, Arequipa Region, Puno Region
- Parent range: Andes

Jayu Laqhi (Aymara jayu salt, laqhi gorge, precipice, "salt gorge (or cliff)", hispanicized spelling Jayulaque) is a mountain in the Andes of Peru, about 4,600 metres (15,092 ft) high. It is located in the Arequipa Region, Caylloma Province, Chuca District, and in the Puno Region, Lampa Province, Santa Lucía District.
