= Norman Croucher =

British mountain climber

Norman Croucher OBE (born 1941) is a British mountain climber, a double amputee with two prosthetic legs below the knee.

== Early life ==
Born in 1941, Croucher grew up at Mount Pleasant Farm at Carnkie, Redruth, and was educated at Redruth Grammar School. In 1960, at the age of 19, both of Croucher's legs were severed below the knee by a train after he collapsed in a drunken stupor and fell down an embankment onto a railway line in Wiltshire. He subsequently trained to be a teacher but was still determined to pursue his love of mountaineering in spite of his disability.

He became the first person fitted with artificial limbs to walk the 900 miles from John O'Groats to Lands End in 1969 which he claimed also hardened his stumps for subsequent mountain climbing.

== Mountaineering ==
Six months after the 900-mile walk to Lands End Croucher climbed the Jungfrau and the Mönch mountains in Switzerland and in 1972 he scaled the treacherous west flank of the Eiger. Two years later he also conquered the Matterhorn. He has climbed many other mountains, including peaks in the Himalayas.

His artificial legs are made from aluminium, with a plastic "flexible foot" which enables him to wear mountain boots or fit crampons. Writing about him, Chris Bonington was quoted as stating "There is no one like him, his extraordinary achievements have earned him a place in climbing history."

In a December 1979 article in the South American Explorer, Crouch wrote about the thermal advantages of not having lower legs during high-altitude ascents:

Obviously, keeping your feet warm is a problem in high altitude climbing — but only if you have feet. While companions war-dance to keep theirs from freezing, I can stand on ice for hours. Climbing high or in a bivouac, I'm always the joker who doesn't have cold feet.

Croucher concluded his article by noting that there were advantages beyond just being impervious to frozen feet: "I need take no special precautions against hookworms, leeches and short snakes."

== Awards and motivational speaking ==
Twice voted Association of Disability and Rehabilitation 'Man of the Year' -in 1971 and 1978 - he was also appointed an OBE for his voluntary work with the disabled in 1977. In 1979 he was chosen from nominees from 121 countries as one of only three people in the world to receive an International Award for Valour in Sport. He was the subject of This Is Your Life in May 1976.

Croucher received an honorary doctorate from Heriot-Watt University in 2005.

== In popular culture ==
In "Walkabout", the fourth episode of the American TV series Lost, John Locke incorrectly identifies Croucher as having climbed Mt Everest, a feat later accomplished by New Zealand mountaineer and double amputee Mark Inglis.

== Literature ==
- Croucher, Norman: Outdoor Pursuits for Disabled People. Disabled Living Foundation (October 1974) ISBN 0859411869
- Croucher, Norman: Tales of many mountains. Amanda Press 1989 ISBN 0-9514337-0-9
- Croucher, Norman: Legless but Smiling. An Autobiography. Charnwood 2002. ISBN 0-7089-9336-2
- Funk, Gaby: "Mit Prothesen auf die Berge der Welt. Der britische Bergsteiger Norman Croucher." In: Neue Zürcher Zeitung, 9 November 2006, p. 71. Online (German).
