= Jichu Qullu (San Antonio de Chuca) =

Mountain in Peru

- Location within Peru

Highest point
- Elevation: 4,600 m (15,100 ft)
- Coordinates: 15°45′38″S 71°08′59″W

Naming
- Language of name: Aymara

Geography
- Location: Peru, Arequipa Region, Caylloma Province, San Antonio de Chuca District
- Parent range: Andes

Jichu Qullu (Also known as Aymara jichu ichu, Peruvian feather grass, qullu mountain, ichu mountain, or Ichocollo) is a mountain in the Andes of Peru that reaches a height of approximately 4,600 m (15,100 ft). It is situated in the Arequipa Region, Caylloma Province, Chuca District.
