= Anqasi (Caylloma) =

Mountain in Peru

- Location within Peru

Highest point
- Elevation: 4,800 m (15,700 ft)
- Coordinates: 15°57′21″S 71°06′36″W

Geography
- Location: Peru, Arequipa Region
- Parent range: Andes

Anqasi (Quechua for cobalt salt used for dyeing, hispanicized spelling Anccase) is a mountain in the Andes of Peru, about 4,800 metres (15,748 ft) high. It is located in the Arequipa Region, Caylloma Province, Chuca District. It lies northwest of Sullk'a Chuqa at a little lake named Anqasiqucha ("cobalt salt lake", hispanicized Ancasecocha).
