= Ccotalaca =

Human settlement in Arequipa Region, Peru

Coordinates: 15°30′55″S 071°01′26″W

Ccotalaca is a populated place in Arequipa Region, Peru.

== See also ==
- Chivay
