= Caylloma District =

Coordinates: 15.1903°S 71.7750°W

Caylloma
- District
- Interactive map of Caylloma
- Country: Peru
- Region: Arequipa
- Province: Caylloma
- Capital: Caylloma

Area
  - Total: 1,499 km^{2} (579 sq mi)
- Elevation: 4,310 m (14,140 ft)

Population (2005 census)
  - Total: 4,101
  - Density: 2.736/km^{2} (7.086/sq mi)
- Time zone: UTC-5 (PET)
- UBIGEO: 040505

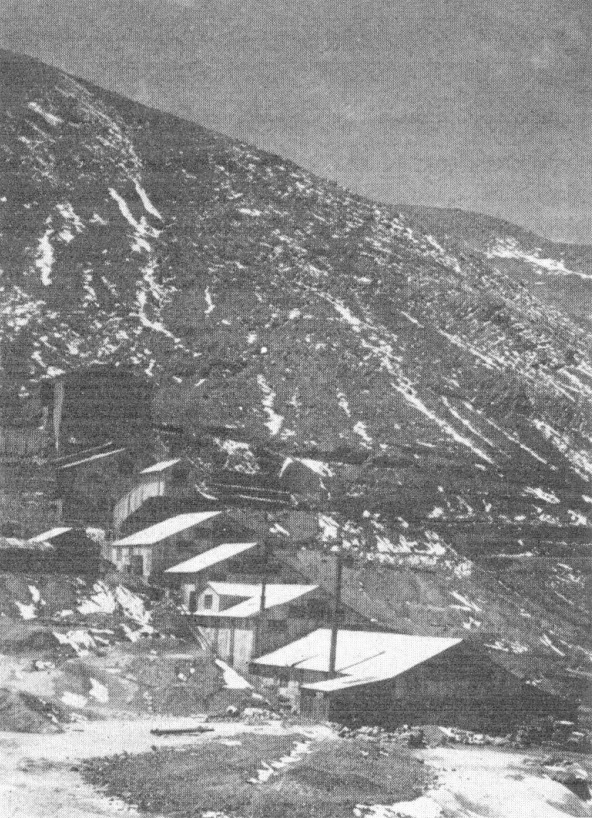

Caylloma District is one of twenty districts of the province Caylloma in Peru.

== Geography ==
Some of the highest mountains of the district are listed below:

- Chunkara
- Chila
- Chilla Qullu
- Chunta
- Ch'uxña
- Hatun Chunkara
- Ichhu Pampa
- Inka Pirqa
- Janq'u Llalla
- Junt'uta
- Kiwicha
- Kuntur Sayana
- Kunturi
- Minasniyuq
- Puka Kancha
- Pukara
- Qarwa Tira
- Qullpa Q'asa
- Qura Qura
- Qutu
- Qhiwalluni
- Q'atawiña
- Q'illa Q'illa
- Tiklla
- T'allani Urqu
- Uta Sinqa
- Waqra
- Yaritayuq
- Yawri Qucha
- Yuraqmayu

== Ethnic groups ==
The people in the district are mainly indigenous citizens of Quechua descent. Quechua is the language which the majority of the population (62.79%) learnt to speak in childhood, 36.39% of the residents started speaking using the Spanish language (2007 Peru Census).
