= Tisco District =

Tisco
- District
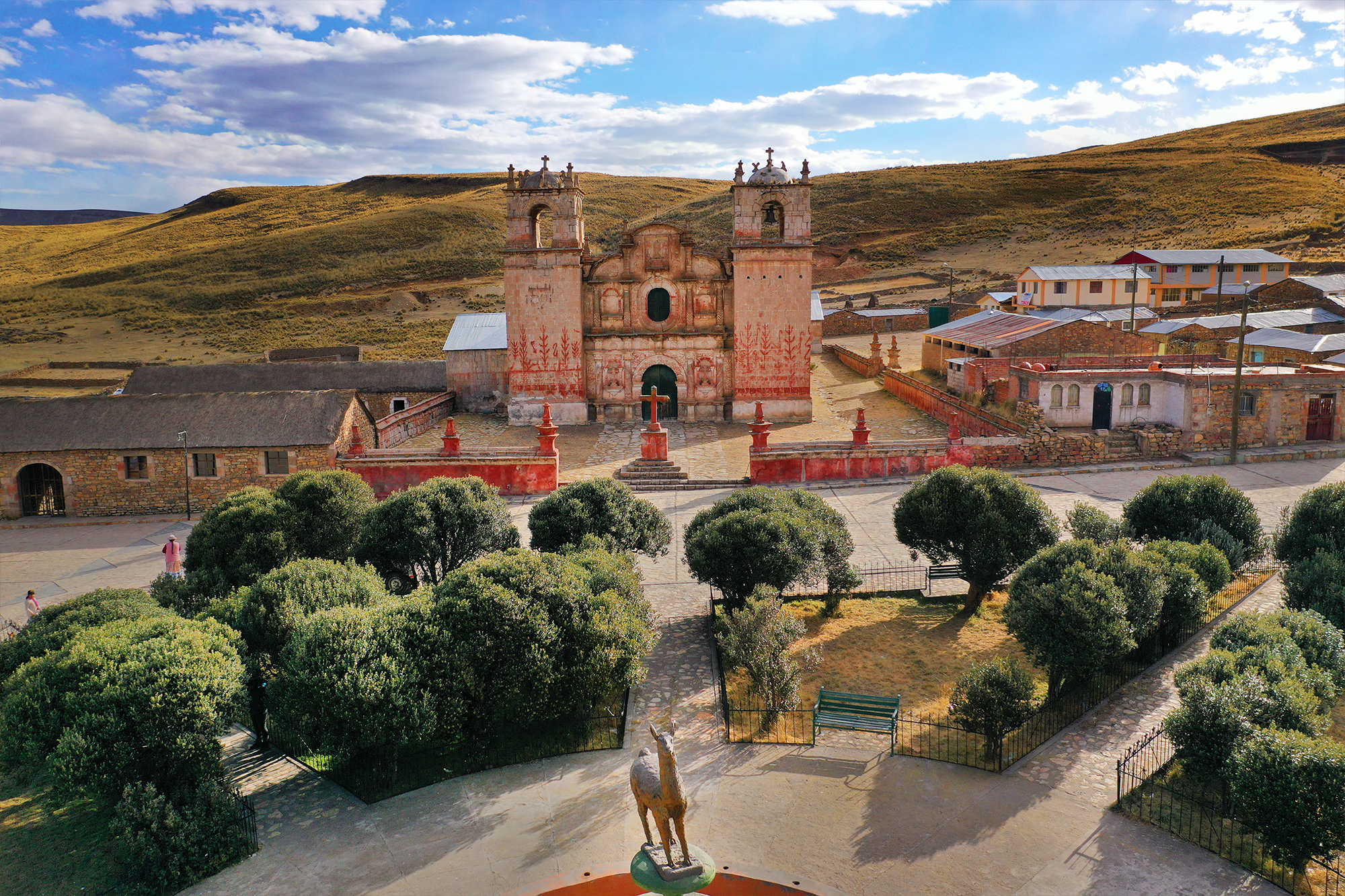
- Tisco's church and main plaza

- Location within Peru
- Coordinates: 15.3476°S 71.4461°W
- Country: Peru
- Region: Arequipa
- Province: Caylloma
- Capital: Tisco

Government
  - Mayor: Primitivo Sebastian Huaracha Ancca

Area
  - Total: 1,445.02 km^{2} (557.93 sq mi)
- Elevation: 4,188 m (13,740 ft)

Population (2005 census)
  - Total: 2,249
  - Density: 1.556/km^{2} (4.031/sq mi)
- Time zone: UTC-5 (PET)
- UBIGEO: 040517

Tisco District is one of twenty districts of the province Caylloma in Peru.

== Geography ==
Some of the highest mountains of the district are listed below:

- Allqamari
- Apachita
- Chilluma
- Chuqi Pirwa
- Chuqi Phiruru
- Chuqi Tampu
- Janq'u
- Jañuma Pirwa
- Kallka K'uchu
- Kimsa Chata
- Kiska Kiska
- Kuntur Sayana
- Laramani
- Misa Urqu
- Pirwa
- Puma Urqu
- Qillqa
- Qillwa
- Q'ara Qullu
- Q'iwiri
- Wallatani
- Wayna Kunturiri
- Wila Pukara
- Wiluma
- Wiska Apachita
- Wisk'achayuq
- Wiswillani
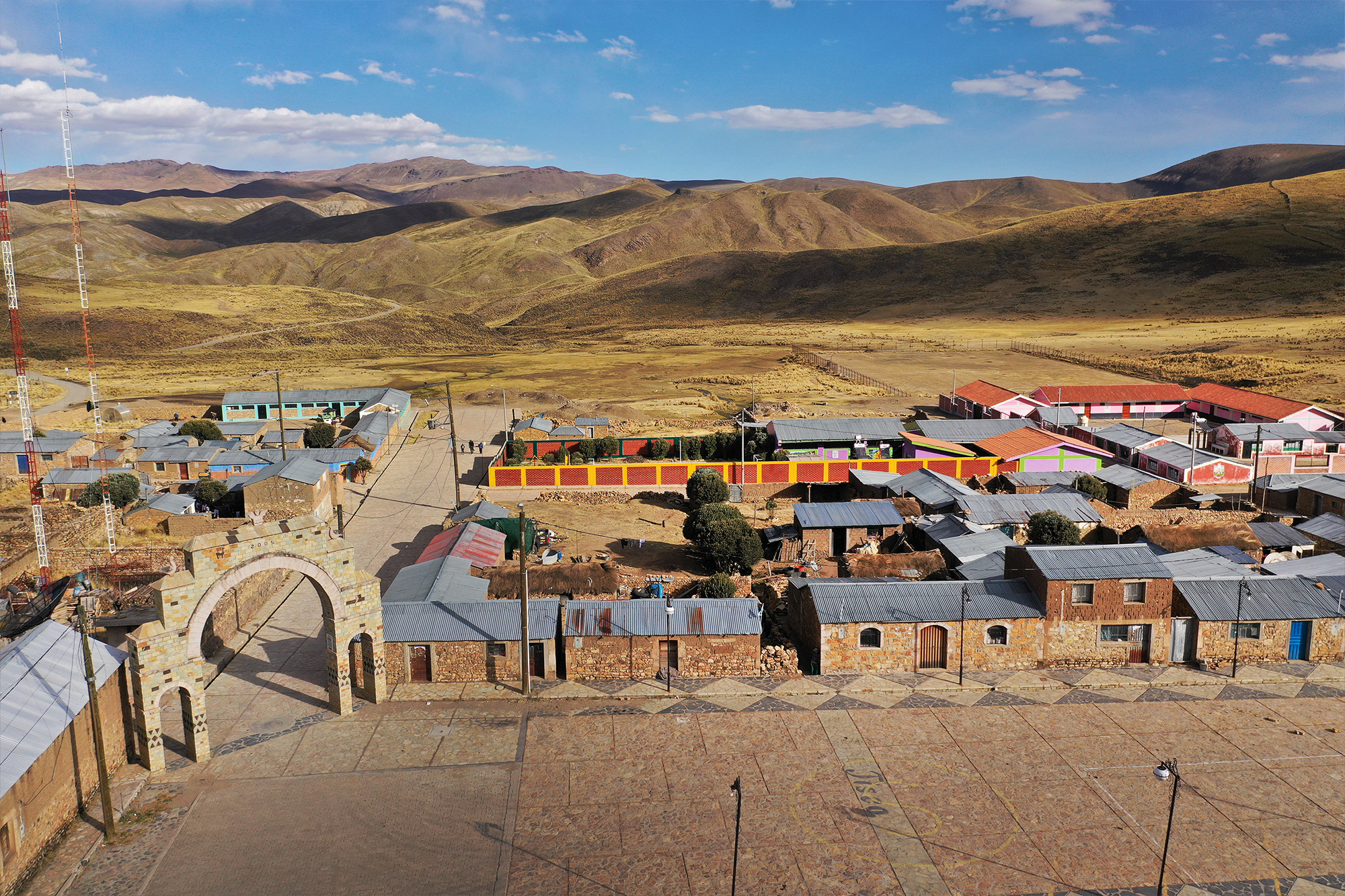
Entrance to Tisco's main plaza through its gate

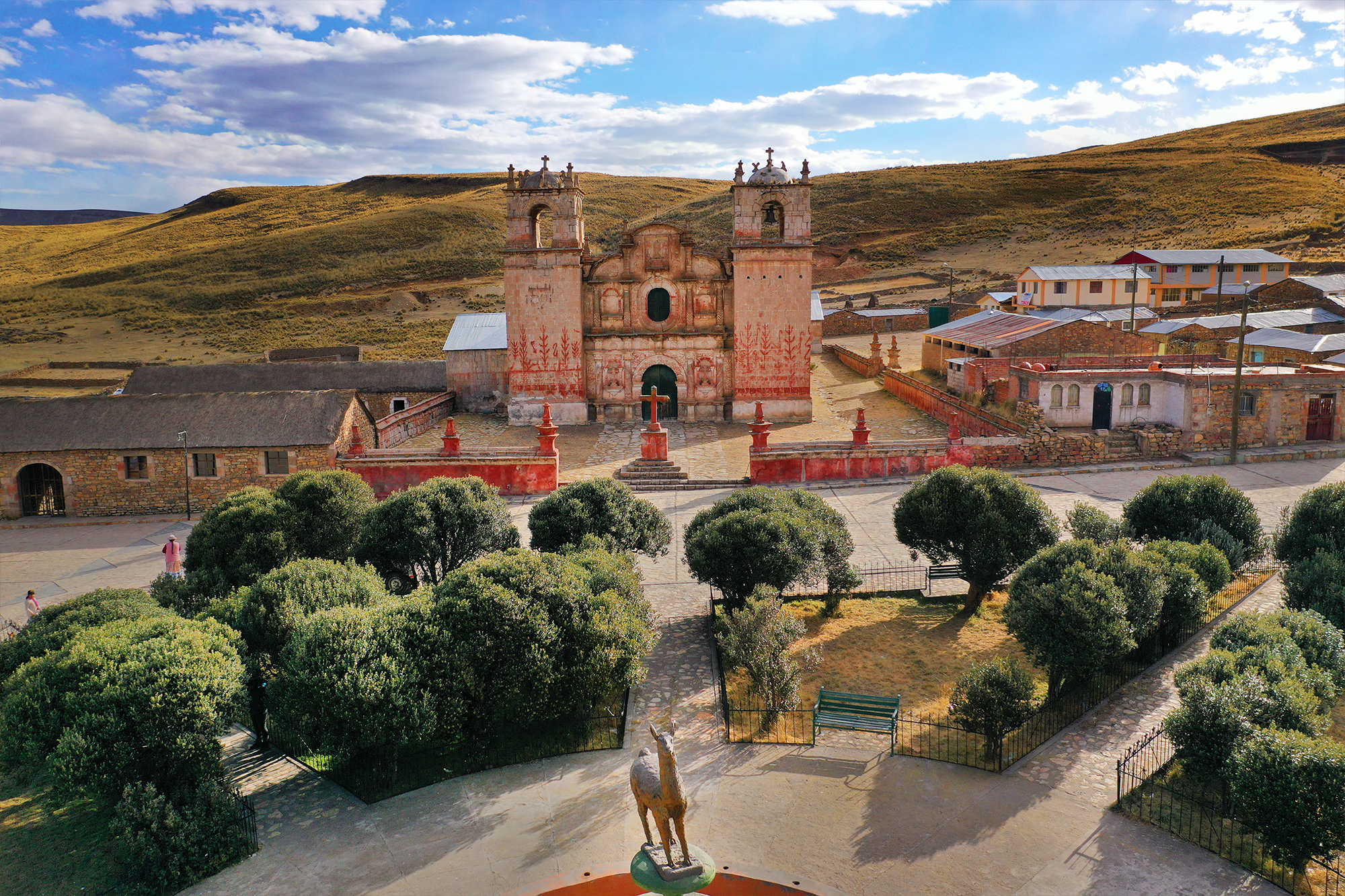
Church of San Pedro Apostol de Tisco, with Plaza in foreground

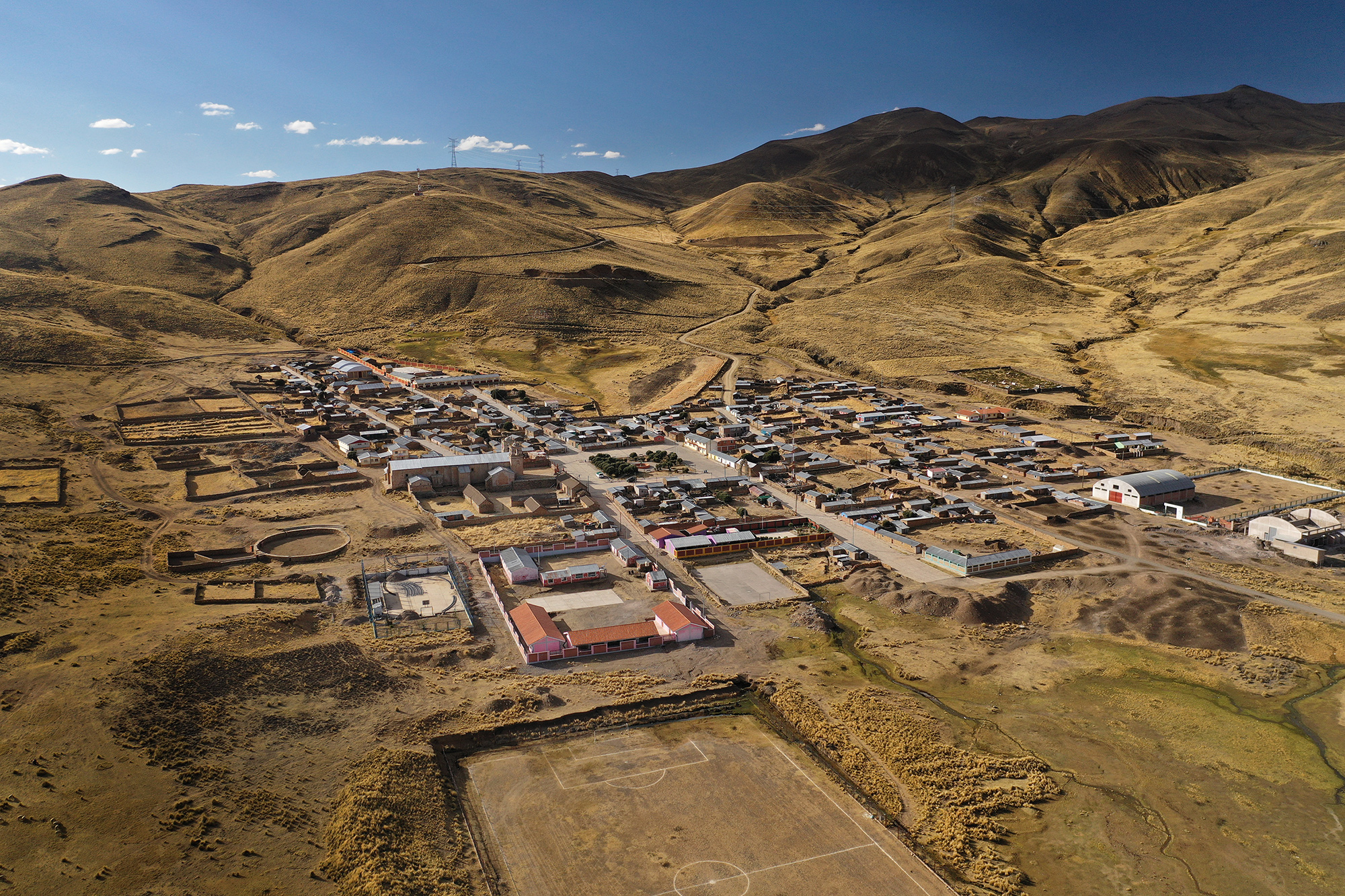
The village of Tisco as seen from the air

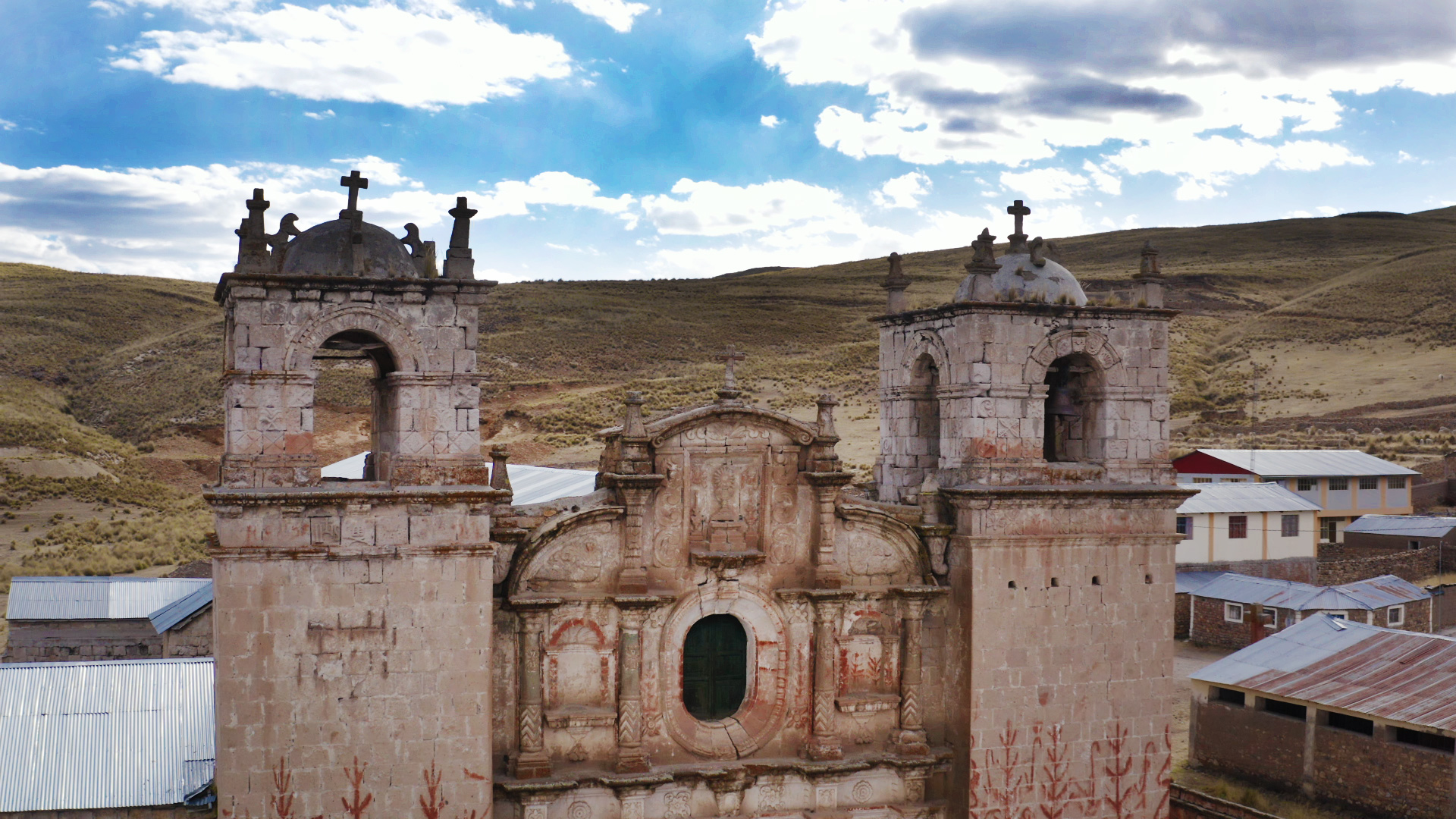
The towers of Tisco's church

== Ethnic groups ==
The people in the district are mainly indigenous citizens of Quechua descent. Quechua is the language which the majority of the population (86.76%) learnt to speak in childhood, 13.06% of the residents started speaking using the Spanish language (2007 Peru Census).

== See also ==
- Samaquta
