= Tapay District =

Coordinates: 15.5775°S 71.9412°W

Tapay
- District
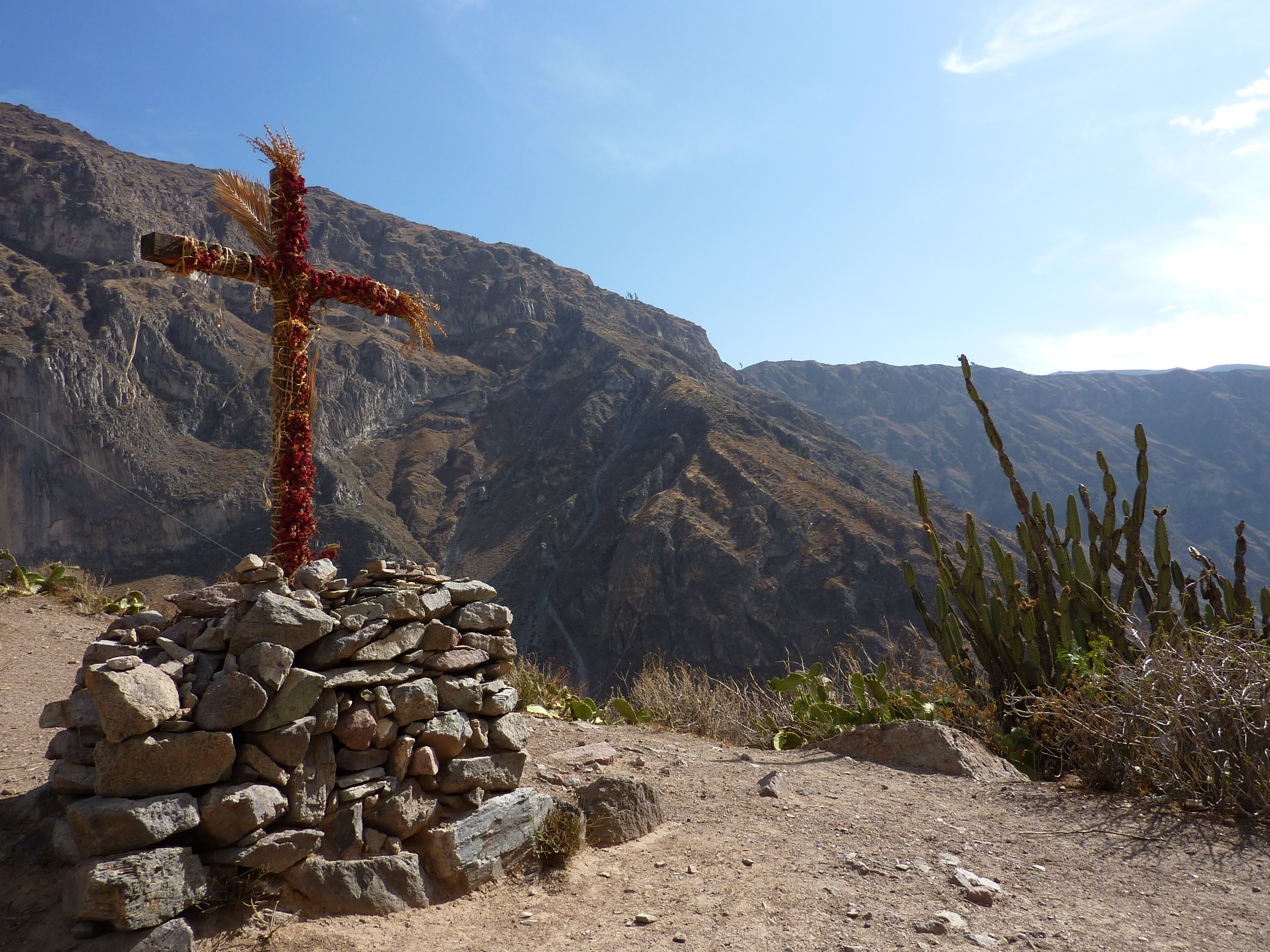
- Cross with geraniums in Malata, Tapay District
- Interactive map of Tapay
- Country: Peru
- Region: Arequipa
- Province: Caylloma
- Capital: Tapay

Government
  - Mayor: X

Area
  - Total: 420.17 km^{2} (162.23 sq mi)
- Elevation: 2,975 m (9,760 ft)

Population (2005 census)
  - Total: 880
  - Density: 2.1/km^{2} (5.4/sq mi)
- Time zone: UTC-5 (PET)
- UBIGEO: 040516

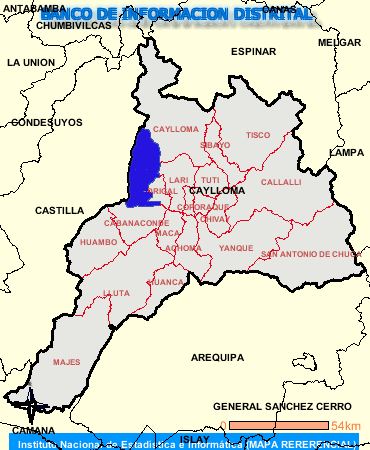
Map of the districts of Caylloma Province

Tapay District is one of twenty districts of Caylloma Province in Peru.

== Geography ==
The Chila mountain range traverses the district. One of the highest mountains of the district is Suriwiri. Other mountains are listed below:

- Apachita
- Janq'u Quta
- Jichu Qullu
- K'ayrawiri
- Llimayuq
- Minasniyuq
- Minaspata
- Pariwana
- Puka Puka
- Q'illa Q'illa
- Q'inchu
- Sani
- Silla Urqu
- Sillani
- Such'iri
- Utt'aña
- Wallatani
- Wanqhay T'ira
- Wayllaqucha

Tapay lies north of the Colca valley.

== Ethnic groups ==
The people in the district are mainly indigenous citizens of Quechua descent. Quechua is the language which the majority of the population (72.10%) learnt to speak in childhood, 27.10% of the residents started speaking using the Spanish language (2007 Peru Census).
