= Coporaque District, Caylloma =

Coordinates: 15.6281°S 71.6477°W

Coporaque
- District
- Interactive map of Coporaque
- Country: Peru
- Region: Arequipa
- Province: Caylloma
- Capital: Coporaque

Government
  - Mayor: William Florencio Bernal Huarca

Area
  - Total: 111.98 km^{2} (43.24 sq mi)
- Elevation: 3,575 m (11,729 ft)

Population (2005 census)
  - Total: 973
  - Density: 8.69/km^{2} (22.5/sq mi)
- Time zone: UTC-5 (PET)
- UBIGEO: 040506

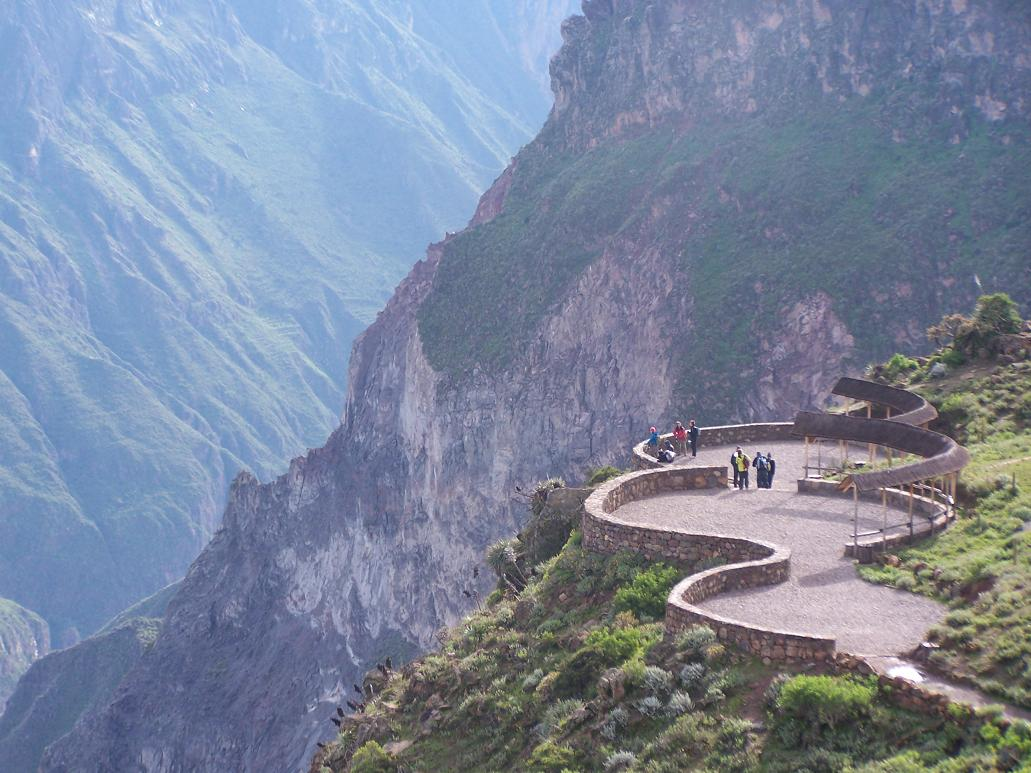

Coporaque District is one of twenty districts of the Caylloma Province in Peru.

== Geography ==
The Chila mountain range traverses the district. One of the highest mountains of the district is Qullqiri at approximately 5,200 m (17,100 ft). Other mountains are listed below:

- Hatun Urqu
- Pumachiri
- Uma Qala
- Willkayuq
- Yuraq Qaqa

== Ethnic groups ==
The people in the district are mainly indigenous citizens of Quechua descent. Quechua is the language which the majority of the population (61.18%) learnt to speak in childhood, 37.62% of the residents started speaking using the Spanish language (2007 Peru Census).

== See also ==
- Pukara
- Qantumayu
