= Huambo District, Caylloma =

Coordinates: 15.7309°S 72.1103°W

Huambo Wamp'u
- District
- Interactive map of Huambo
- Country: Peru
- Region: Arequipa
- Province: Caylloma
- Founded: November 4, 1889
- Capital: Huambo

Government
  - Mayor: Saul Robles Alvarez Pari

Area
  - Total: 705.79 km^{2} (272.51 sq mi)
- Elevation: 3,332 m (10,932 ft)

Population (2005 census)
  - Total: 949
  - Density: 1.34/km^{2} (3.48/sq mi)
- Time zone: UTC-5 (PET)
- UBIGEO: 040507
- Website: huambo-colca.com

Huambo District is one of twenty districts of the province Caylloma in Peru.
