= Ccotaña =

Populated place in Arequipa Region, Peru

Coordinates: 15°11′53″S 071°35′44″W

Ccotaña is a populated place in Arequipa Region, Peru.

== See also ==
- Chivay
