= Caylloma province =

Coordinates: 15°38′12″S 71°36′08″W

Caylloma
- Province
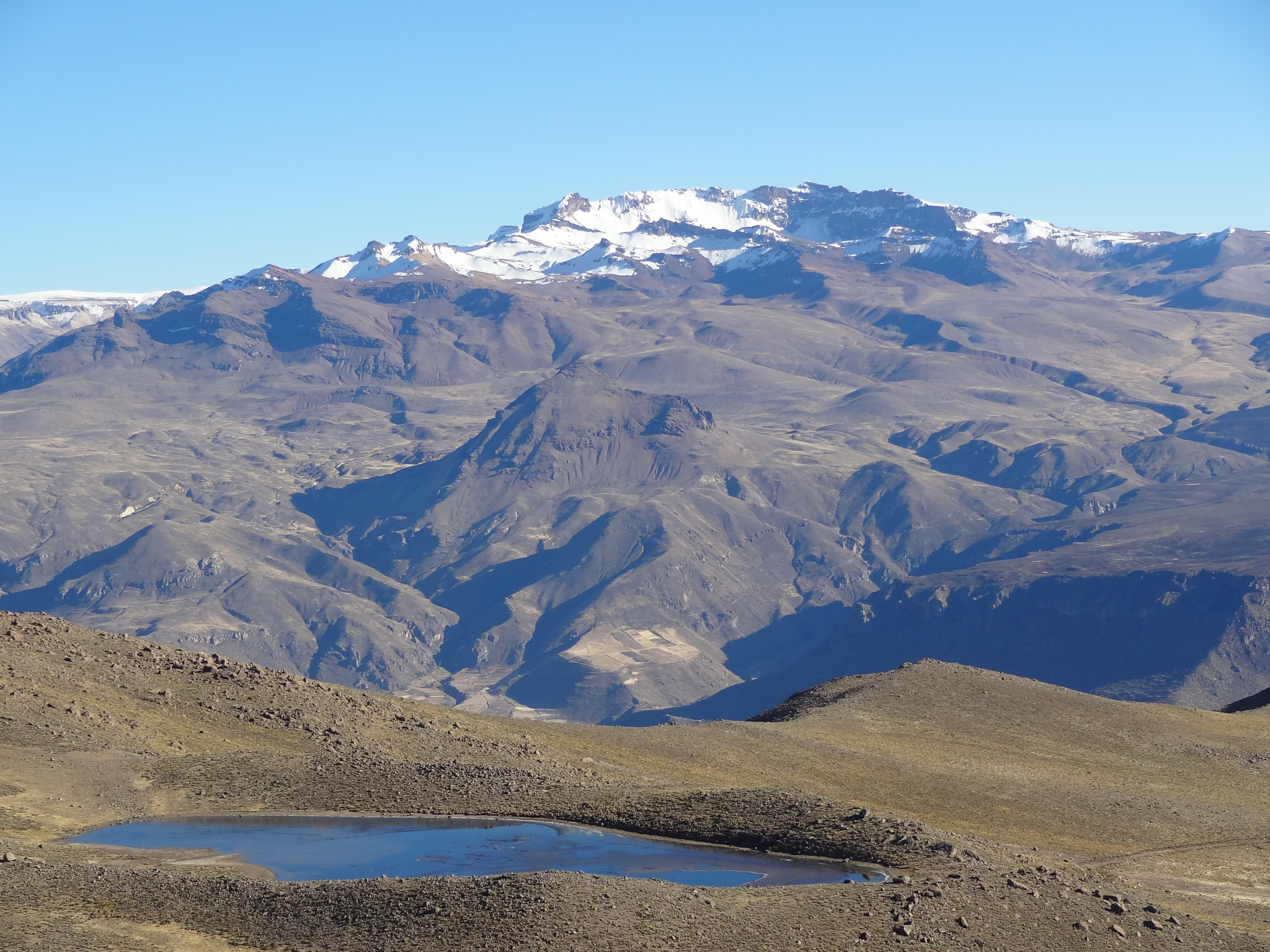
- Mismi as seen from the southeast

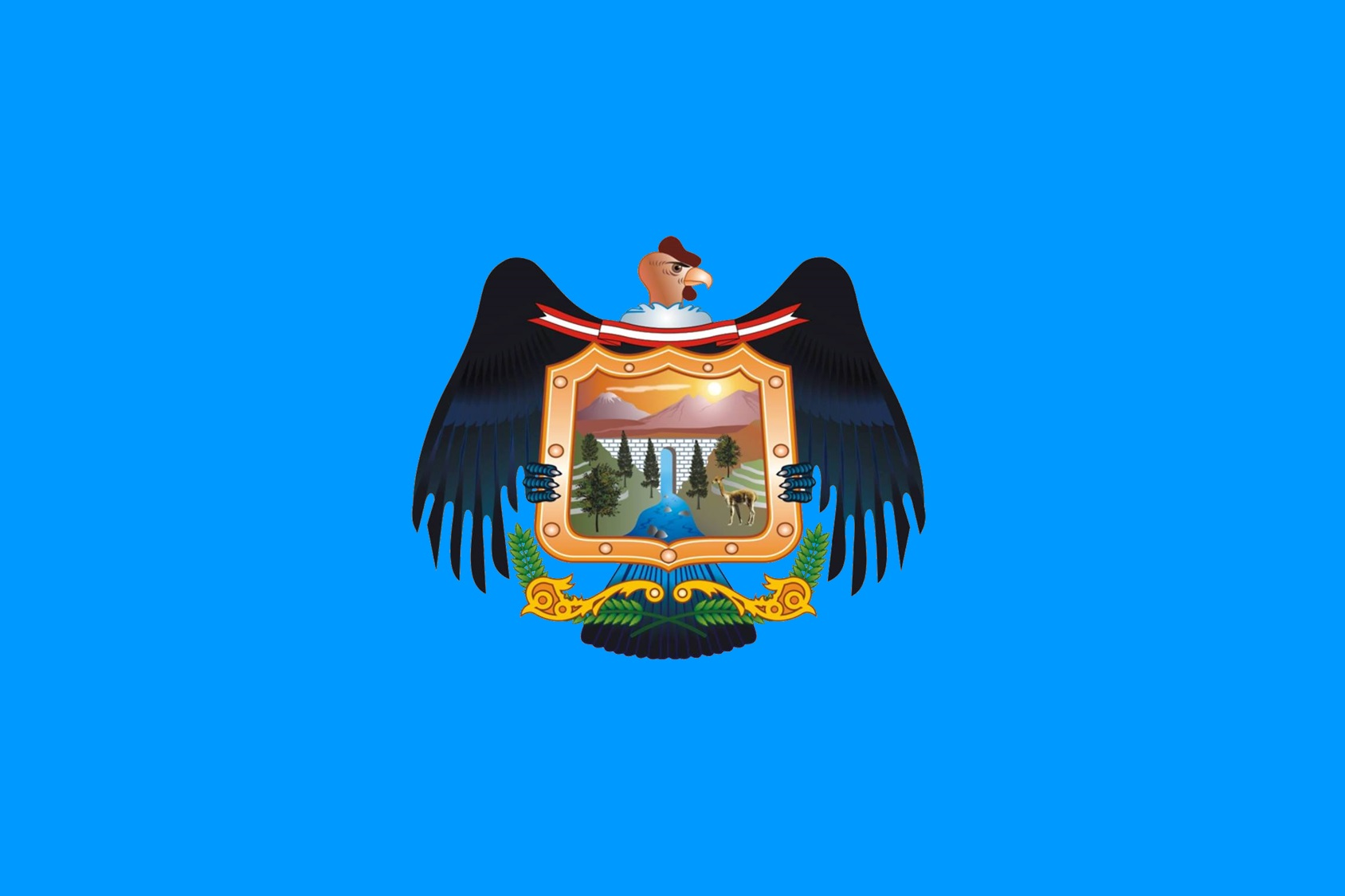
- Flag

- Location of Caylloma in the Arequipa Region
- Country: Peru
- Region: Arequipa
- Capital: Chivay

Government
  - Mayor: Jorge Modesto Cueva Tejada (2007)

Area
  - Total: 14,019.46 km^{2} (5,412.94 sq mi)

Population (2017 census)
  - Total: 86,771
  - Density: 6.1893/km^{2} (16.030/sq mi)
- UBIGEO: 0405

Caylloma is the largest of eight provinces in the Arequipa Region of Peru.

== Geography ==
The Chila mountain range traverses the province. One of the highest mountains of the province is Mismi. Other mountains are listed below:

- Allqamarini
- Ananta
- Ankachita
- Anqasi
- Anta Salla
- Aqu Kulluna
- Chullunkhäni
- Chulluqani
- Chunkara
- Chuqi Kuraw
- Chuqi Pirwa
- Chila
- Ch'uwaña (Huanca)
- Ch'uwaña (Lari)
- Hatun Chunkara
- Hatun Pila
- Hatun Siqita
- Huch'uy Q'asa
- Iru Muqu
- Janq'u Quta
- Jañuma Pirwa
- Jayu Laqhi
- Jichu Qullu
- Jichu Qullu (Chuca)
- Karpa Muqu
- Kimsa Chata
- Kiwicha
- Kunturi
- K'ayrawiri
- Laramani
- Lawraq Muqu
- Llallawa
- Llimayuq
- Lluqu
- Minasniyuq
- Minaspata
- Misa Chunkara
- Parwayani
- Pilluni
- Pirwa
- Puka Puka
- Puka Urqu
- Pukara (Lari)
- Puma Urqu
- P'isaqani
- Qillqa
- Qillwa
- Qullqiri
- Q'illa Q'illa
- Q'illu Q'illu
- Q'inchu
- Salla P'ukuruyuq
- Saya Sirk'a
- Sillani
- Tiklla (Caylloma-Tuti)
- Tiklla (Lari)
- T'allani Urqu
- T'ula Muqu
- Wajchani
- Wallatani
- Wankara
- Wanqani
- Warank'anthi
- Wayllaqucha
- Wiluma
- Wiska Wiska
- Wisk'achayuq
- Wiswillani
- Yana Salla
- Yana Surk'a
- Yaritani
- Yuraq Apachita

== Political division ==
The province is divided into twenty districts:

- Achoma
- Cabanaconde
- Callalli
- Caylloma
- Chivay
- Coporaque
- Huambo
- Huanca
- Ichupampa
- Lari
- Lluta
- Maca
- Madrigal
- Majes
- San Antonio de Chuca
- Sibayo
- Tapay
- Tisco
- Tuti
- Yanque

== Points of interest ==
The Colca Canyon lies in the Huambo and Callalli districts.

== See also ==
- Ccotalaca
- Ccotaña
- Muyurqa Lake
- Paraxra
- Pukara, Coporaque
- Samaquta
- Uskallaqta
- Uyu Uyu
