= Hichocollo (mountain) =

Mountain in Peru

- Location within Peru

Highest point
- Elevation: 4,800 m (15,700 ft)
- Coordinates: 15°20′49″S 71°58′00″W

Naming
- Language of name: Aymara

Geography
- Location: Peru, Arequipa Region, Caylloma Province, Tapay District
- Parent range: Andes, Chila

Hichocollo (possibly from Aymara jichu Peruvian feather grass, qullu mountain, "ichhu mountain") is a mountain in the Chila mountain range in the Andes of Peru which reaches a height of approximately 4,800 m (15,700 ft). It is located in the Arequipa Region, Caylloma Province, Tapay District. Hichocollo lies east of the Molloco River which is a right affluent of Colca River.
