= Jañuma Pirwa =

Mountain in Peru

- Location within Peru

Highest point
- Elevation: 5,125 m (16,814 ft)
- Coordinates: 15°03′11″S 71°25′15″W

Naming
- Language of name: Aymara

Geography
- Location: Peru, Arequipa Region
- Parent range: Andes

Jañuma Pirwa (Aymara jañu mosquito, uma water, pirwa, piwra granary, Hispanicized spelling Jañuma Pirhua) is a 5,125-metre-high (16,814 ft) mountain in the Andes of Peru. It is located in the Arequipa Region, Caylloma Province, Tisco District. It lies southwest of Chuqi Pirwa and southeast of Pirwa.

The Pirwamayu (Quechua for "granary river") originates north of the mountain. It flows to the south as a right affluent of the Qullqa River.
