= Chungara (Arequipa) =

Mountain in Peru

- Location within Peru

Highest point
- Elevation: 5,000 m (16,000 ft)
- Coordinates: 15°23′50″S 71°35′25″W

Naming
- Language of name: Quechua

Geography
- Location: Peru, Arequipa Region
- Parent range: Andes, Chila

Chungara (possibly from Aymara for "pointed mountain") is a mountain in the Chila mountain range in the Andes of Peru, about 5,000 m (16,404 ft) high . It is located in the Arequipa Region, Caylloma Province, on the border of the districts of Caylloma and Tuti. It lies south of Jatunchungara ("big pointed mountain" or "big Chungara") and Mesa Chungara and northeast of Ticlla.
