= Jatunchungara =

Mountain in Peru

- Location within Peru

Highest point
- Elevation: 5,287 m (17,346 ft)
- Coordinates: 15°22′40″S 71°35′39″W

Naming
- Language of name: Quechua

Geography
- Location: Peru, Arequipa Region
- Parent range: Andes, Chila

Jatunchungara (possibly from Quechua hatun big, Aymara Chunkara "pointed mountain", Chungara the name of a neighboring mountain, "big pointed mountain" or "big Chungara") is a 5,287-metre-high (17,346 ft) mountain in the Chila mountain range in the Andes of Peru. It is located in the Arequipa Region, Caylloma Province, on the border of the districts of Caylloma and Sibayo. It lies north of Chungara and Mesa Chungara. There is a small lake north of the mountain named Chungara.
