= Surihuiri =

Mountain in Peru

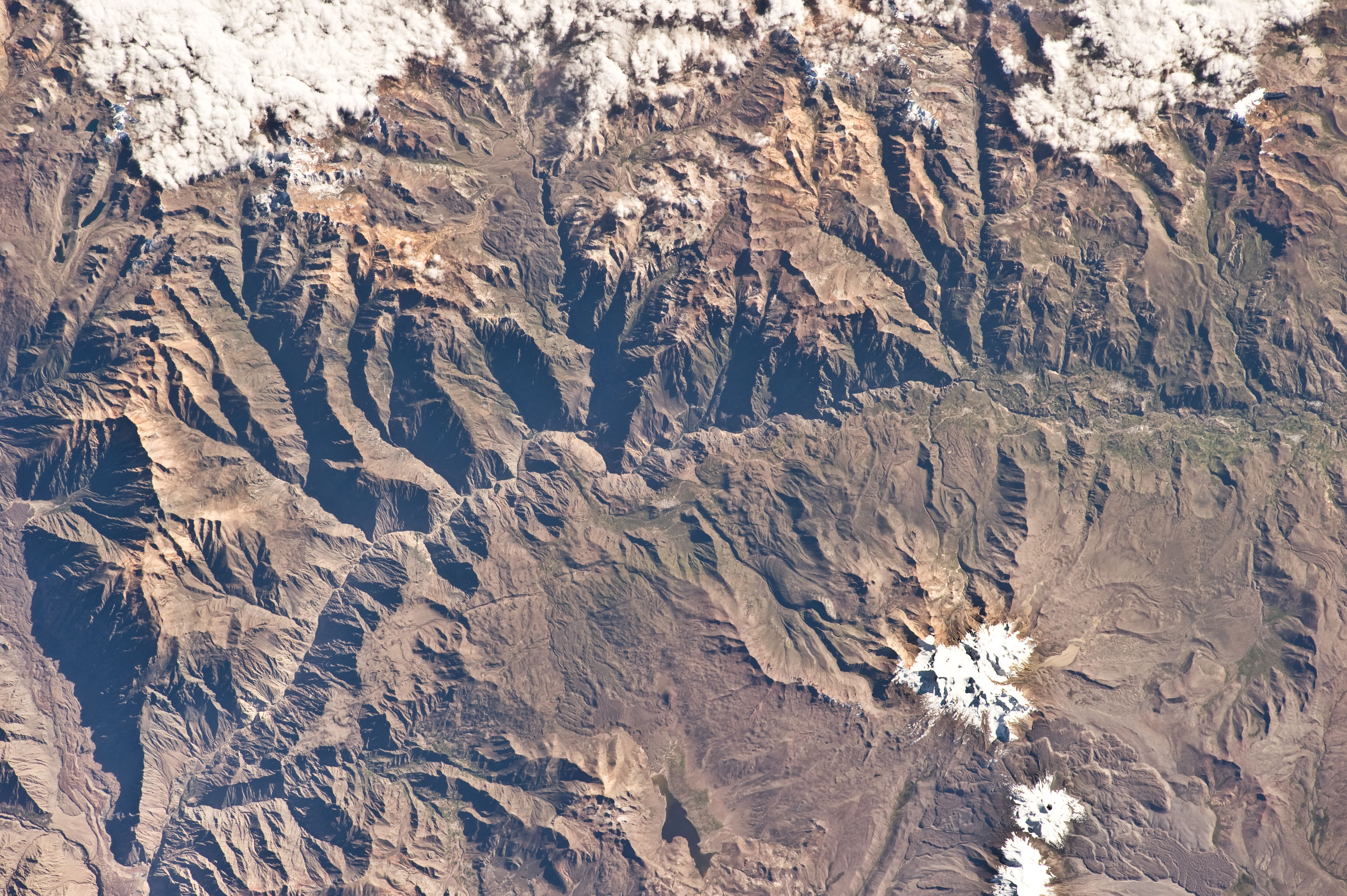
- The Colca River and Surihuiri north of it at the upper rim of this image as seen from the ISS

Highest point
- Elevation: 5,506 m (18,064 ft)
- Coordinates: 15°27′36″S 71°52′08″W

Naming
- Language of name: Quechua

Geography
- Location within Peru
- Location: Peru, Arequipa Region
- Parent range: Andes, Chila

Surihuiri, Sorehuire or Surihuire is a 5,506-metre-high (18,064 ft) mountain in the Chila mountain range in the Andes of Peru. It is located in the Arequipa Region, Caylloma Province, in the districts Lari, Madrigal and Tapay. Surihuiri lies north of the Colca River, northwest of the mountains Mismi, Quehuisha and Jatunpila and south of Minaspata. Some of the nearest villages are Tambomayo and Surihuire.

== See also ==
- Huallatane
