= Huallatane (Peru) =

Mountain in Peru

- Location within Peru

Highest point
- Elevation: 5,000 m (16,000 ft)
- Coordinates: 15°24′14″S 71°54′58″W

Naming
- Language of name: Aymara

Geography
- Location: Peru, Arequipa Region, Caylloma Province
- Parent range: Andes, Chila

Huallatane (possibly from Aymara wallata snow ball, snow lump / Andean goose, -ni a suffix to indicate ownership, "the one with a snow ball", "the one with a snow lump" or "the one with the Andean goose") is a mountain in the Chila mountain range in the Andes of Peru, about 5,000 metres (16,404 ft) high. It is situated in the Arequipa Region, Caylloma Province, Tapay District. Huallatane lies north of the Colca Canyon, north-west of the mountain Surihuiri.
