= Mismi =

Mountain in the Andes of Peru

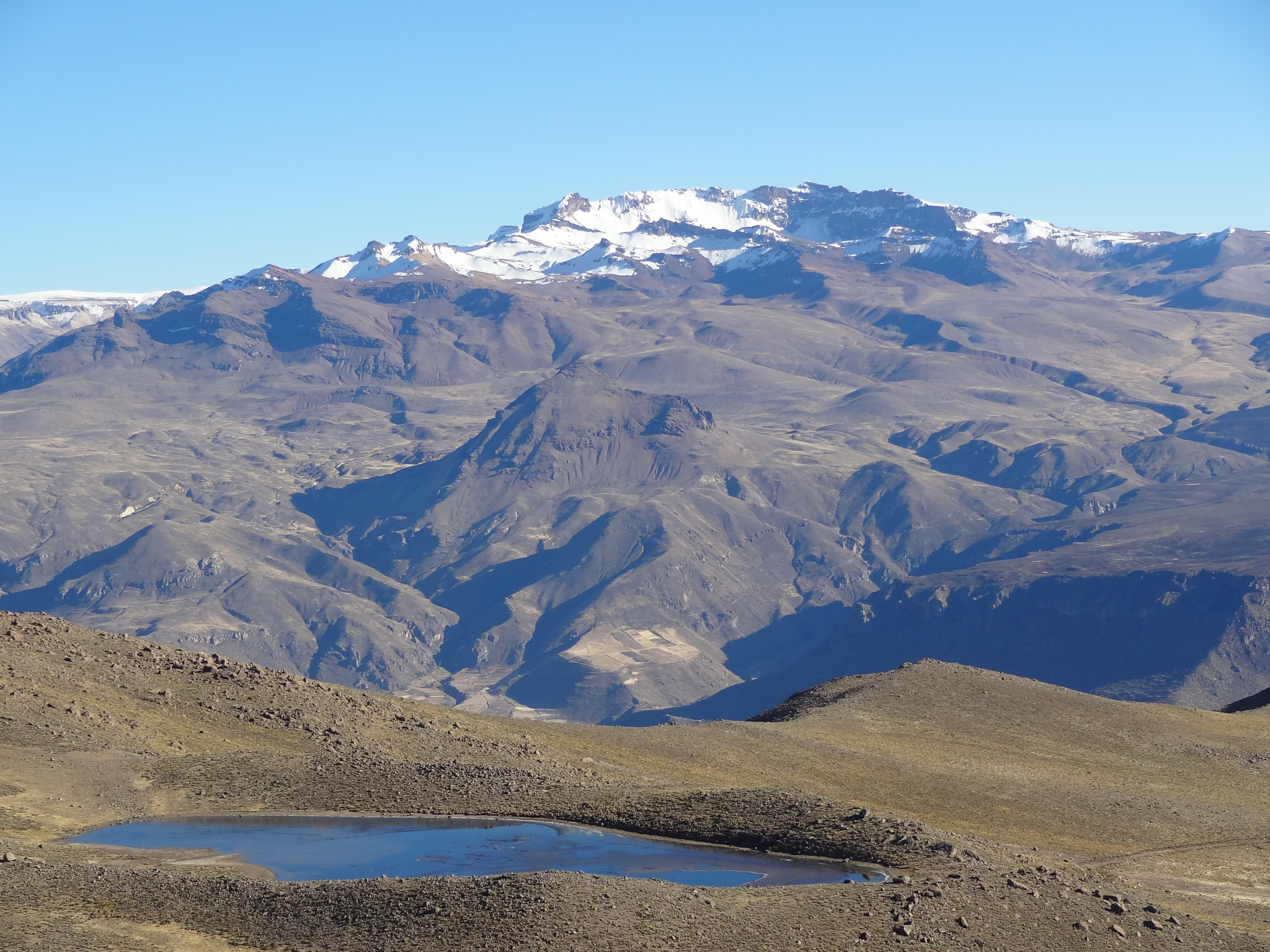
- Mismi seen from South-East

Highest point
- Elevation: 5,597 m (18,363 ft)
- Prominence: 868 m (2,848 ft)
- Coordinates: 15°31′31″S 71°41′27″W

Geography
- Location within Peru
- Location: Arequipa Region, Peru
- Parent range: Andes, Ch'ila mountain range

Geology
- Mountain type: Stratovolcano

Mismi is a 5,597-metre (18,363 ft) mountain peak of volcanic origin in the Chila mountain range in the Andes of Peru. A glacial stream on the Mismi was identified as the most distant source of the Amazon River in 1996; this finding was confirmed in 2001 and again in 2007. This claim has been challenged with three locations for the source of the Amazon identified, depending upon the definition of "source." The waters from Mismi flow into the streams Carhuasanta and Apachita, which flow into the Apurímac River. It is a tributary of the Ucayali which later joins the Marañón to form the Amazon proper.

== Location ==
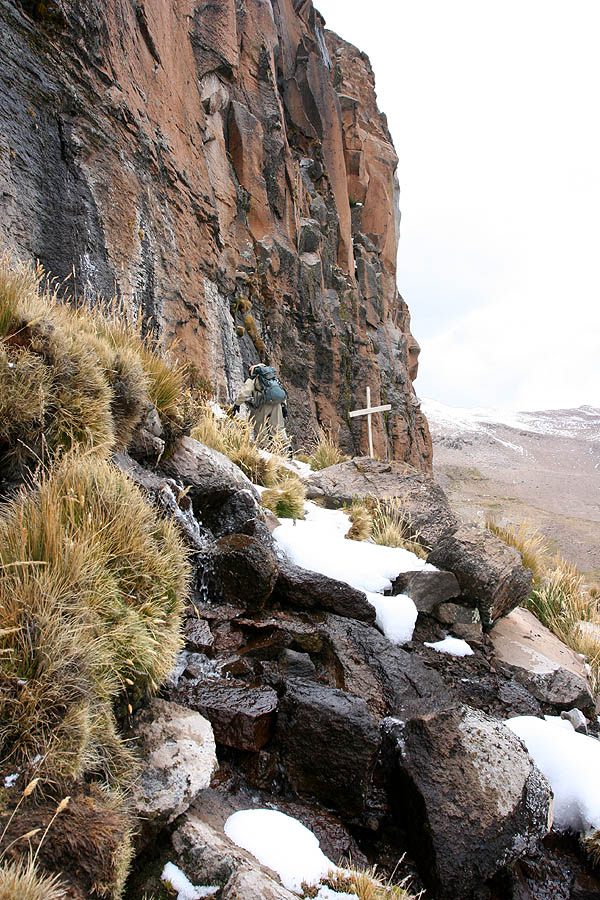
The Amazon originates from a cliff at Mismi, with a sole sign of a wooden cross.

Mismi is about 160 km (99 mi) west of Lake Titicaca and 700 km (435 mi) southeast of Peru's capital city, Lima, in the Arequipa Region. It is one of the highest points of Colca Canyon. There are several glaciers on the peak.

== The Cousteau Amazon Expedition ==
In 1982 Jean-Michel Cousteau led a large scale scientific exploration of the Amazon from its mouth to its origin. The "Cousteau Amazon Expedition" cost eleven million dollars and culminated in a six-hour television documentary titled "Cousteau's Amazon" released in 1983. It offered study information to last years and gave insights into the biology and geology of the largest river system on earth. This expedition was broken into three separate groups and the upper Amazon section was covered by "The Flying Expedition" tasked with exploring the upper third to Arequipa from the river's origin.

Traditionally, explorers and geographers define the origin of a river system by tracking the longest tributaries while heading upstream, as volume can change dramatically from month to month. In a system as complex as the Amazon basin with dozen of streams as candidates in previously poorly mapped areas, no consensus could plausibly be substantiated for some time, and the origin was left to speculation. Half a dozen sites claimed title to "The Origin of the Amazon" and until 1982 several were in the running. But, in 1971, Loren McIntyre discovered the true source of the Amazon before anyone else. This has since been confirmed by satellite.

Using an international team of twelve and bringing in expeditionary specialists from Germany, France, Argentina, Peru and the US, Jean-Michel Cousteau put together resources and logistics spanning a thousand miles of unknown jungle.

The Upper Amazon expedition (The Flying Expedition) included an Eastern European multi-axled articulated Land Rover for use on land, a float plane Papagaiu, for air support and reconnaissance, and the Peruvian Air Force offered a high elevation helicopter to reach the upper levels of the Chila mountain range in Peru.

Expedition support bases were established in Cuzco, in the mountains, in Arequipa, and high in the Chilca mountain range at Caylloma for the quest to find the origin of the Amazon. Many locations were remote, making it necessary to surmount language, terrain and logistical difficulties, as the mountain team made their way up the Selinque River to the flanks of the Mismi. At this mountain's base, Cousteau dispatched a team of German alpinists who climbed the 18,000 feet (5,486 m) volcano and returned in two days. During their descent, they found melt water dropping into a fissure. This cleft varied from two meters to half a meter wide, angling down the slope. This stream flowed nearly fifty meters before disappearing, emerging again lower downstream to flow between stones and continue its course. They discovered that within the fissure, the water was deep enough to float a small craft, and realized that they were presented with an opportunity. Utilizing pack llamas, kayaker Caril Ridley was brought to the site, and in June 1982, navigating by kayak, became the first person to run the origins of the Amazon. Later expeditions refined the understanding of the river's many origins and its subsequent course to the Atlantic Ocean.

== National Geographic Society Expedition ==
In 2001, it was verified that one of the headwaters of the Amazon River has its glacial source on the Mismi. An expedition of the National Geographic Society discovered that the Qarwasanta stream flowing into Apurímac River originates on the northern slopes of the mountain and then runs its course through other tributaries and rivers to help form the main Amazon River. Brazilian scientists in 2007 confirmed that the headwaters of Apurímac River are the source of the Amazon River and pointed to Mismi as the most probable source of the Amazon.

== See also ==
- Carhuasanta, the source of the Amazon
- Cantumayo
- Ripon Falls, considered to be the source of the Nile river
