= Ancachita =

Mountain in Peru

- Location within Peru

Highest point
- Elevation: 5,131.3 m (16,835 ft)
- Coordinates: 15°37′55″S 71°32′2″W

Geography
- Location: Peru, Arequipa Region, Caylloma Province
- Parent range: Andes

Ancachita (possibly from Quechua anka eagle, chita young domesticated sheep / a little animal which follows its owner) is a mountain in the Andes of Peru, about 5,131.3 metres (16,835 ft) high. It is situated in the Arequipa Region, Caylloma Province, on the border of the districts Callalli and Chivay, east of Chivay. Ancachita lies north of the higher mountains Huarancante and Jello Jello.
