= Sibayo District =

Sibayo
- District
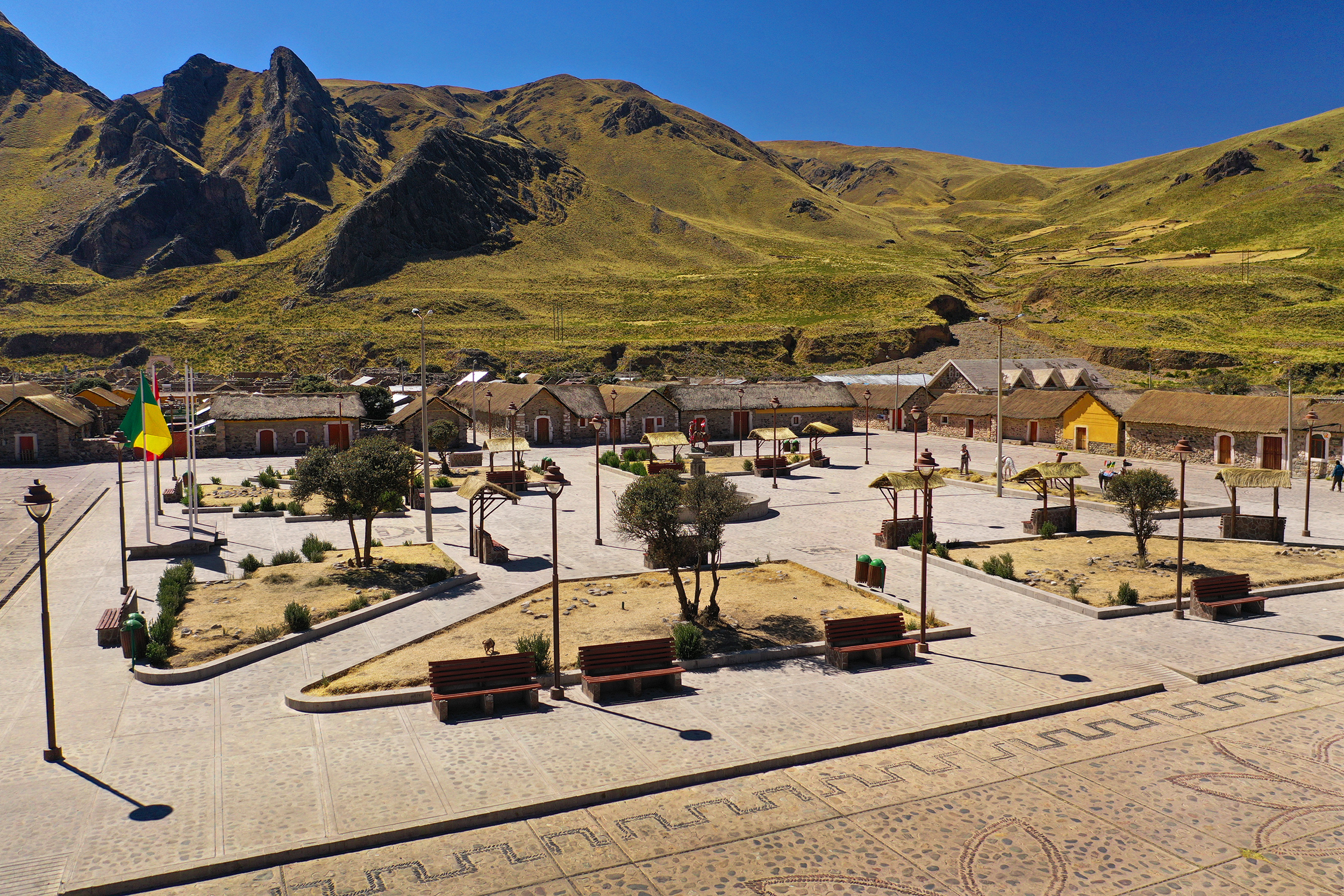
- The main plaza of Sibayo

- Location within Peru
- Coordinates: 15°29′12.1″S 71°27′25.7″W
- Country: Peru
- Region: Arequipa
- Province: Caylloma
- Founded: January 25, 1943
- Capital: Sibayo

Government
  - Mayor: Raul Meliton Mamani Picha

Area
  - Total: 286.03 km^{2} (110.44 sq mi)
- Elevation: 3,810 m (12,500 ft)

Population (2005 census)
  - Total: 1,493
  - Density: 5.220/km^{2} (13.52/sq mi)
- Time zone: UTC-5 (PET)
- UBIGEO: 040515

Sibayo District is one of twenty districts of the province Caylloma in Peru. It is adjacent to Callalli and crossed by the Colca River on one side.

== Ethnic groups ==
The people in the district are mainly indigenous citizens of Quechua descent. Quechua is the language which the majority of the population (55.45%) learnt to speak in childhood, 44.41% of the residents started speaking using the Spanish language (2007 Peru Census).

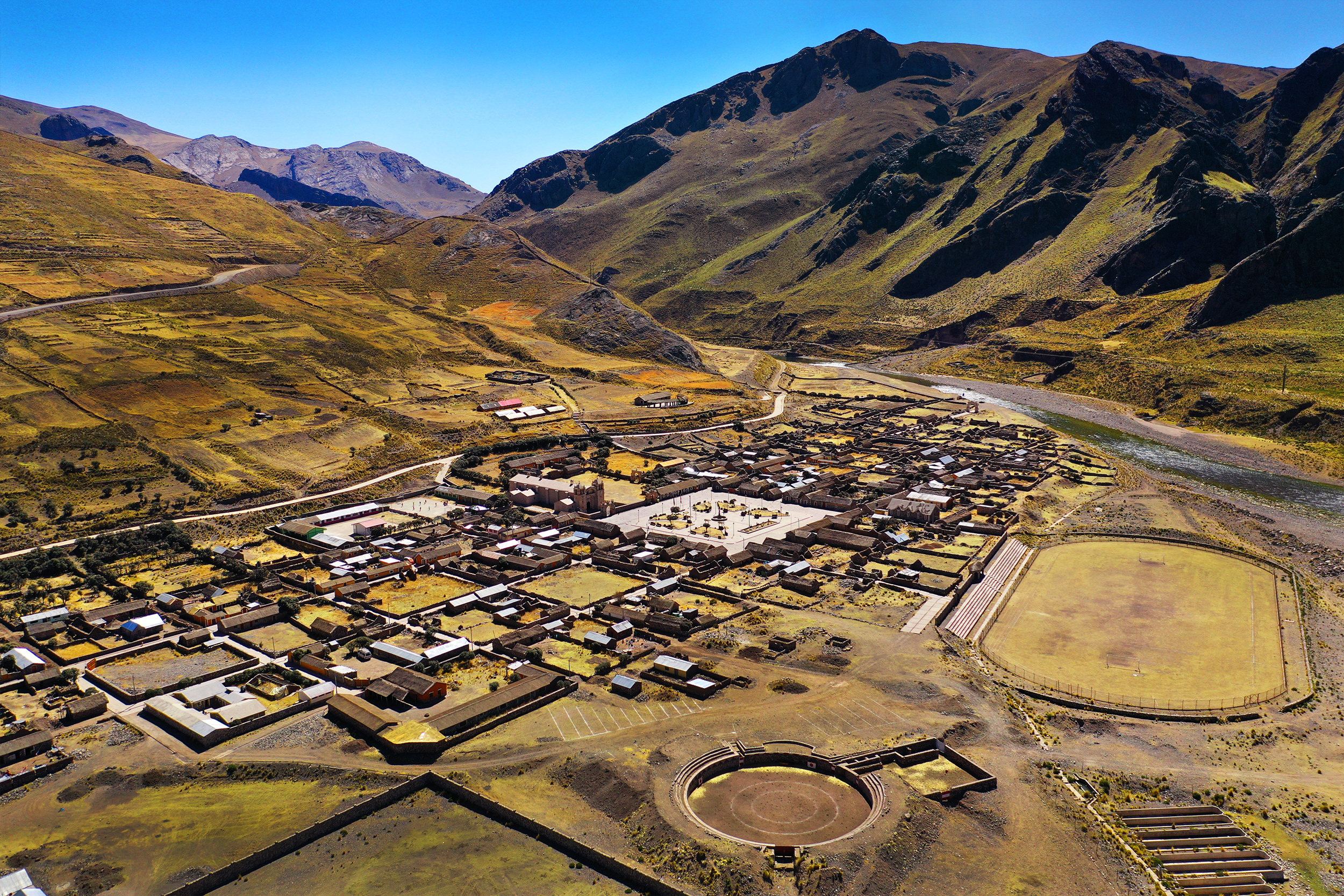
The village of Sibayo as seen from above

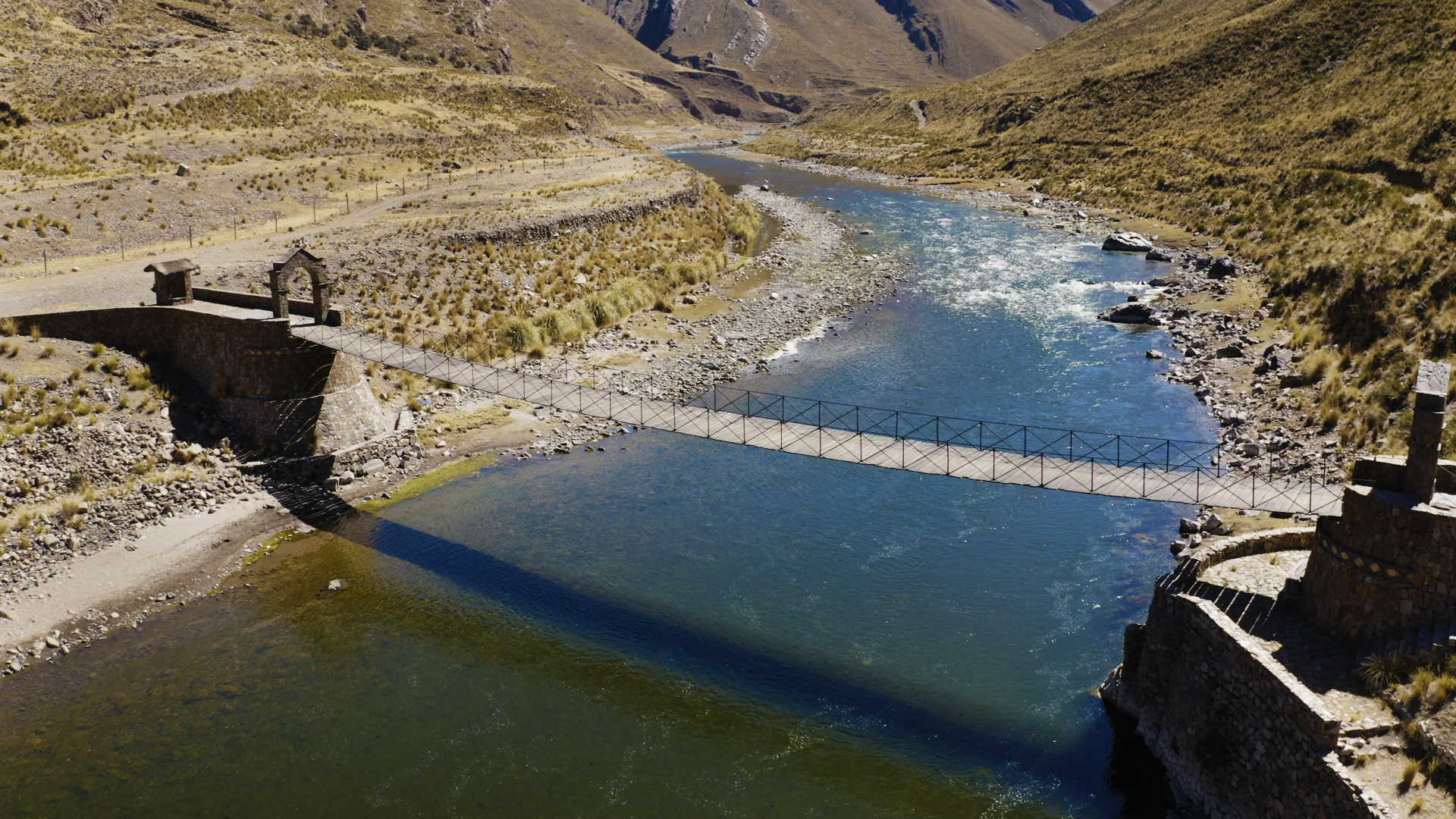
Sibayo's suspended pedestrian bridge

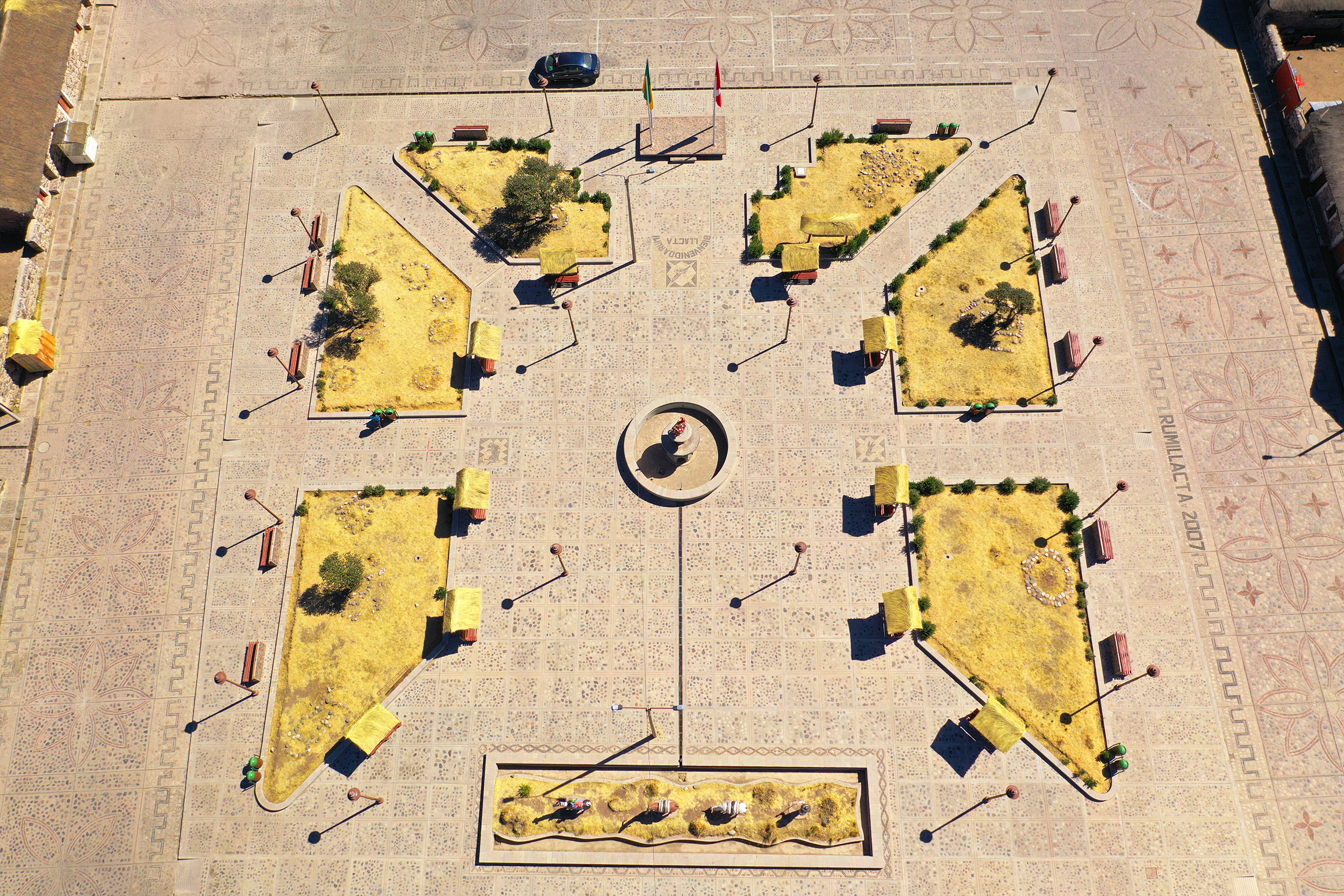
The main plaza in Sibayo as seen from above

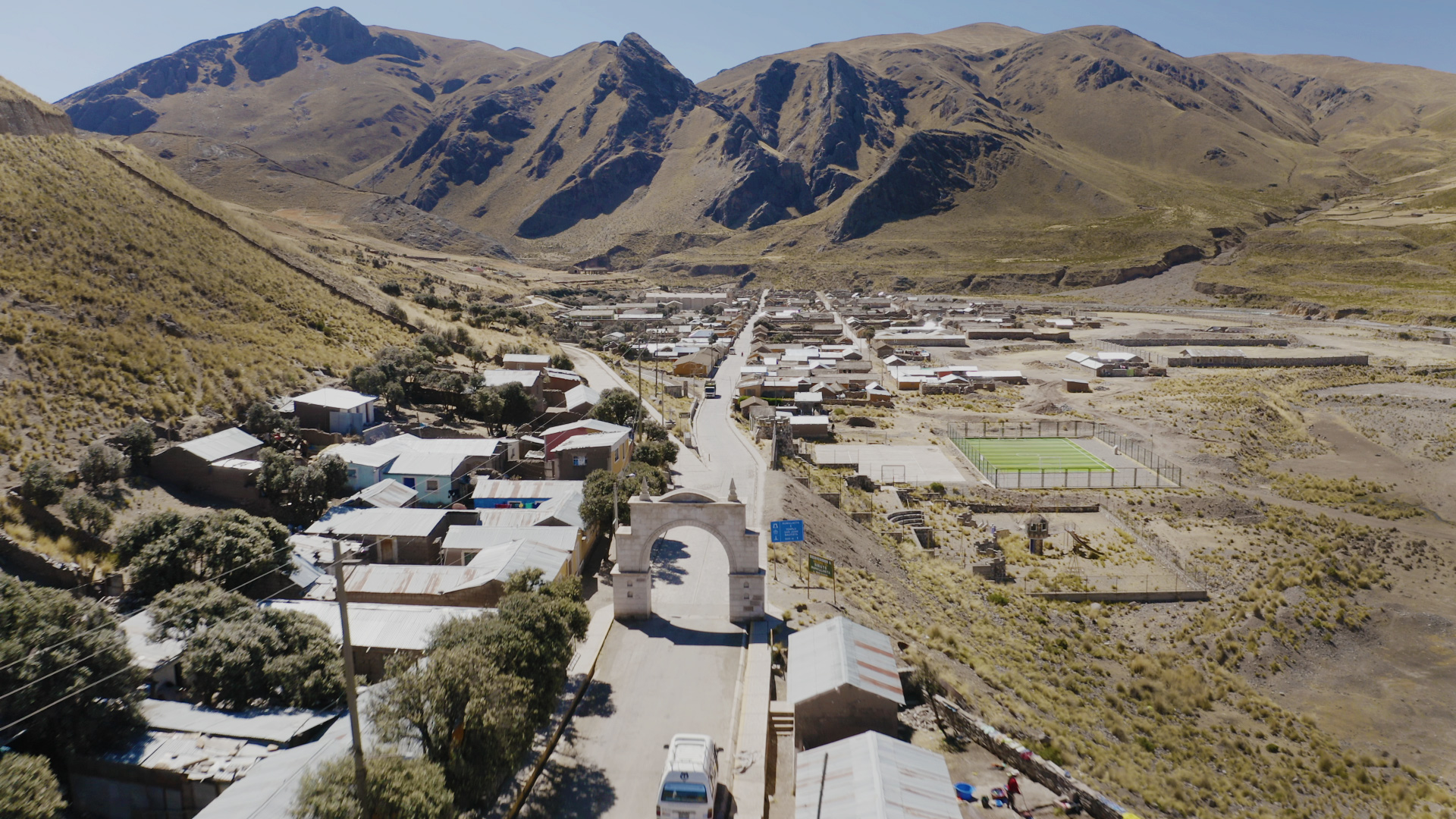
The entrance to Sibayo in the Colca Canyon

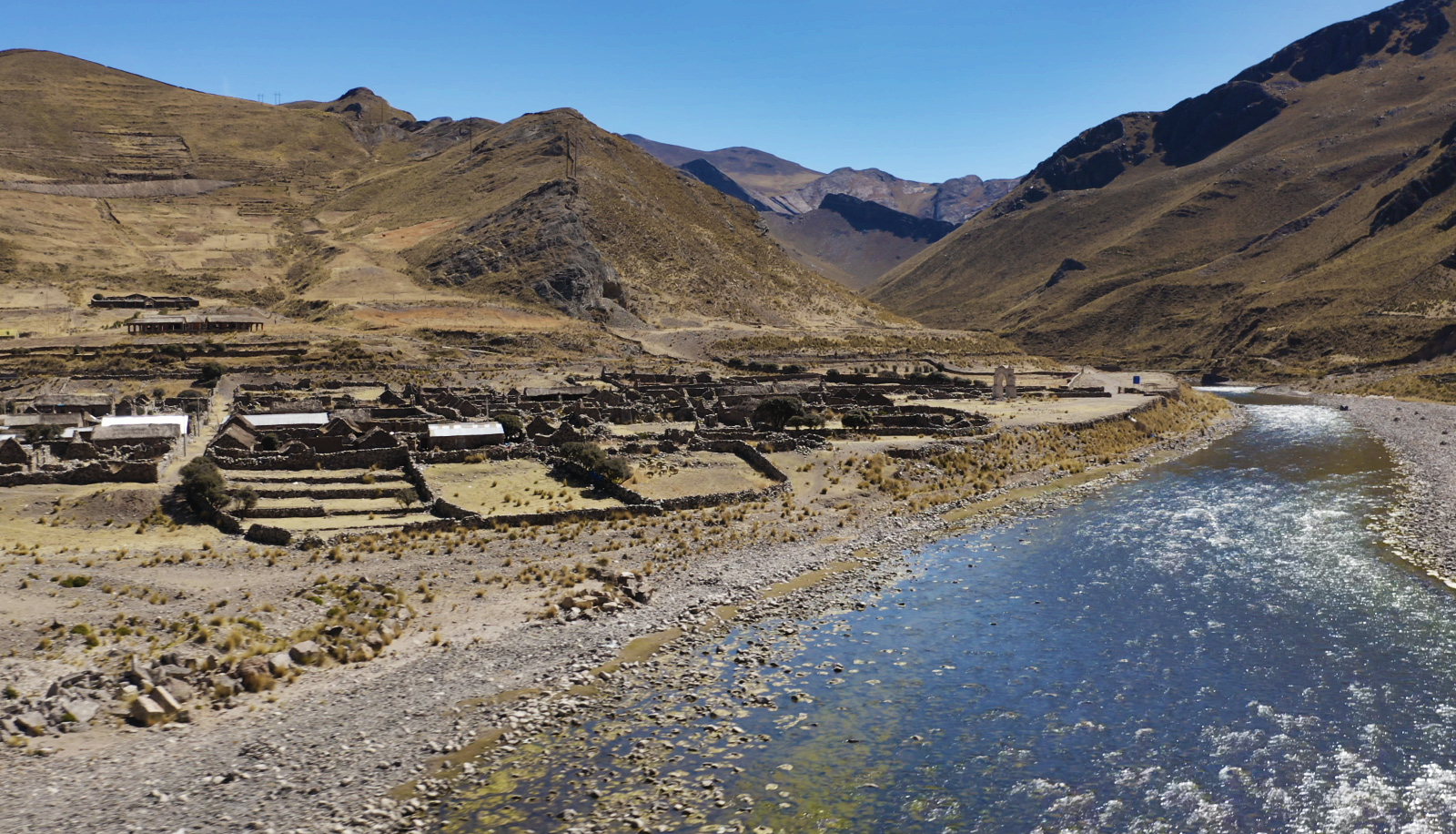
Sibayo's ruins next to the Colca river.

== Climate ==
Climate data for Sibayo, elevation 3,816 m (12,520 ft), (1991–2020)
| Month | Jan | Feb | Mar | Apr | May | Jun | Jul | Aug | Sep | Oct | Nov | Dec | Year |
|---|---|---|---|---|---|---|---|---|---|---|---|---|---|
| Mean daily maximum °C (°F) | 18.1 (64.6) | 17.7 (63.9) | 17.9 (64.2) | 18.2 (64.8) | 17.8 (64.0) | 17.2 (63.0) | 16.9 (62.4) | 18.1 (64.6) | 19.0 (66.2) | 20.0 (68.0) | 20.8 (69.4) | 19.7 (67.5) | 18.5 (65.2) |
| Mean daily minimum °C (°F) | 3.6 (38.5) | 3.8 (38.8) | 3.4 (38.1) | 0.9 (33.6) | −4.0 (24.8) | −6.7 (19.9) | −6.9 (19.6) | −5.7 (21.7) | −3.4 (25.9) | −1.4 (29.5) | −0.5 (31.1) | 1.9 (35.4) | −1.2 (29.7) |
| Average precipitation mm (inches) | 156.0 (6.14) | 156.5 (6.16) | 106.9 (4.21) | 37.5 (1.48) | 4.5 (0.18) | 3.2 (0.13) | 5.5 (0.22) | 5.9 (0.23) | 9.9 (0.39) | 17.0 (0.67) | 21.2 (0.83) | 80.1 (3.15) | 604.2 (23.79) |
Source: National Meteorology and Hydrology Service of Peru

== See also ==
- Callalli District
- Colca Canyon
- Hatun Chunkara
- Paraxra
