= Callalli District =

Callalli
- District
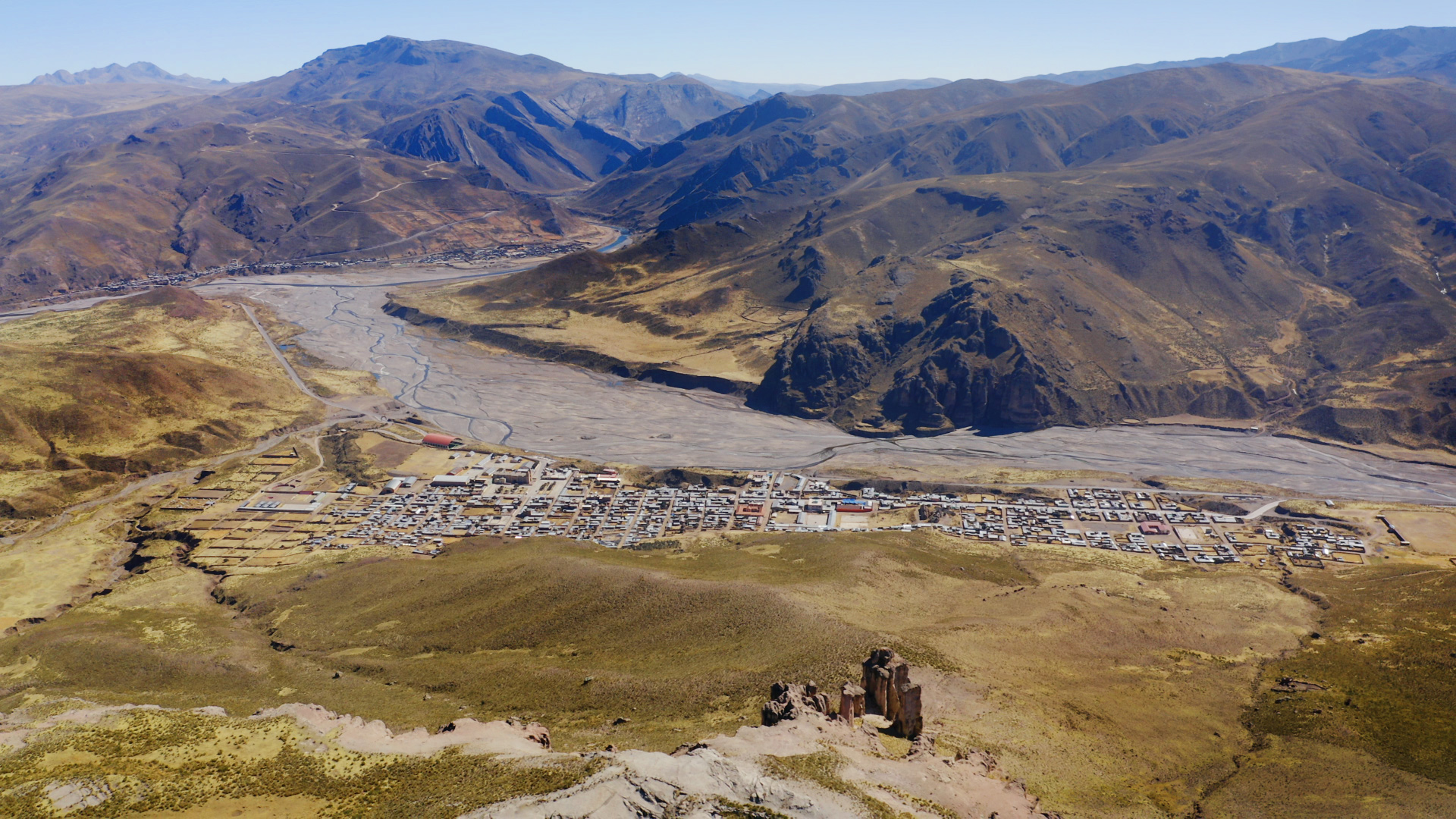

- Location within Peru
- Coordinates: 15.5073°S 71.4462°W
- Country: Peru
- Region: Arequipa
- Province: Caylloma
- Founded: 1573
- Capital: Callalli

Government
  - Mayor: Florencio Josue Valdivia Mamani

Area
  - Total: 1,485.1 km^{2} (573.4 sq mi)
- Elevation: 3,867 m (12,687 ft)

Population (2005 census)
  - Total: 2,554
  - Density: 1.720/km^{2} (4.454/sq mi)
- Time zone: UTC-5 (PET)
- UBIGEO: 040504
- Website: https://www.facebook.com/municallalli/

Callalli District is one of twenty districts of the Caylloma Province in Peru and is located within the geographical area of the Colca Canyon.

Its capital, Callalli, lies on an ancient trade route for Obsidian that ran from Chivay to Lake Titicaca around 1800-200BC. The earliest findings in the region, carvings of camelids in the Mollupunko Cave, date around 8,000 years back. The town of Callalli was founded as a Spanish Reduccion in 1573 with the initial name of Alcantara de Callalli.

Callalli is the main seat of a catholic pastoral team that takes care of a 7,000 km² area including the towns of Callalli, Sibayo, Tisco, Imata and Caylloma. The parish is led by the Austrian priest and missionary Franz Windischhofer since 1991, whose work was acknowledged by the Peruvian government for "building a community of peace" in Peru since 1980.

== Geography ==
One of the highest mountains of the district is Waran K'anthi at approximately 5,426 m (17,802 ft). Other mountains are listed below:

- Ankachita
- Anta Lluku
- Aqu P'unqu
- Chila
- Chilani
- Chhankarani
- Iru Pampa Pata
- Iru Qullu
- Janq'u Q'awa
- Kunturani
- Puka Qaqa Wasi
- Puka Urqu
- Qaqin Qullu
- Qura Wat'a
- Q'achi Sura
- Q'illu Q'illu
- Q'uwasa
- Salla Phukuruyuq
- Sallqa Chuku
- Saqsa
- Sullu Llump'u
- Wayta Pata
- Wila Wila
- Wiru Pampa Pata
- Wiru Qullu
- Wiswillani

== Tourism ==
- Alpaca Fair, a Caylloma Province regional fair of Alpaca breeders convening in Callalli each June to present their alpacas.
- Mollepunko Caves, a rocky shelter and shallow cave system dating from about 6000 years BC, featuring more than 20 carved cave paintings. Said paintings, made by pre-Inca inhabitants, show the early domestication of Camelids among other figures. The caves were probably used for rituals in the pre-Inca era, and as a grave site after the Incas. Local legends point to an Inca Empire treasure being buried close to a large black boulder, as one of the abandoned deliveries of gold to buy free Atahualpa after his execution. Multiple excavation attempts – including an intact, 3m long tunnel in front of the caves and a 2.5m deep man-made ravine under the large boulder, point to treasure hunting having taken place.
- Enchanted Castles of Callalli, a rock formation featuring jagged boulders directly above the city of Callalli.
- Banos Termales de Inca, a thermal bath complex between Callalli and Sibayo.
- Choqueshisha, a ritual site inside of Callalli where local women thank Pachamama for the gift of water with a sacrifice of Llama fat, corn and other local products once a year.
- Puente de Pachachaca, colonial bridge built with ashlars made of volcanic material and boulder. On the road from Cápac Ñan that runs from Cusco to Arequipa and on the Colca River. The bridge is featured on the upper right part of the coat of arms of Callalli.
- Iglesia Callalli de San Antonio de Padua, a Catholic parish church under the patronage of San Antonio de Padua, built in an Andean Baroque style, located in the town center of Callalli. It features a cross-shaped blueprint and a baptistry, two symmetrical towers on the sides and a vaulted roof. Inside are artworks depicting the miracles of San Antonio.
- Chulpas Tahuaya, an above-ground, Pre-Inca grave site featuring four small stone buildings that contain well-preserved bones and skulls.
- Llapa Yanahuara, an Collagua-Inca-Colonial town, with a church built on top of a pre-Hispanic Huaca.
- Ventana del Colca, a rock formation in the form of a window as a natural entrance to the valley and Colca Canyon.
- Choqolaqa, a large rock formation about 2 hours outside Callalli, belonging to the district of Tisco, featuring white towers of eroded rocks. A road leads up to an altitude of 4700m; the rock formation itself can be reached after a short hike at an altitude of 4950m.
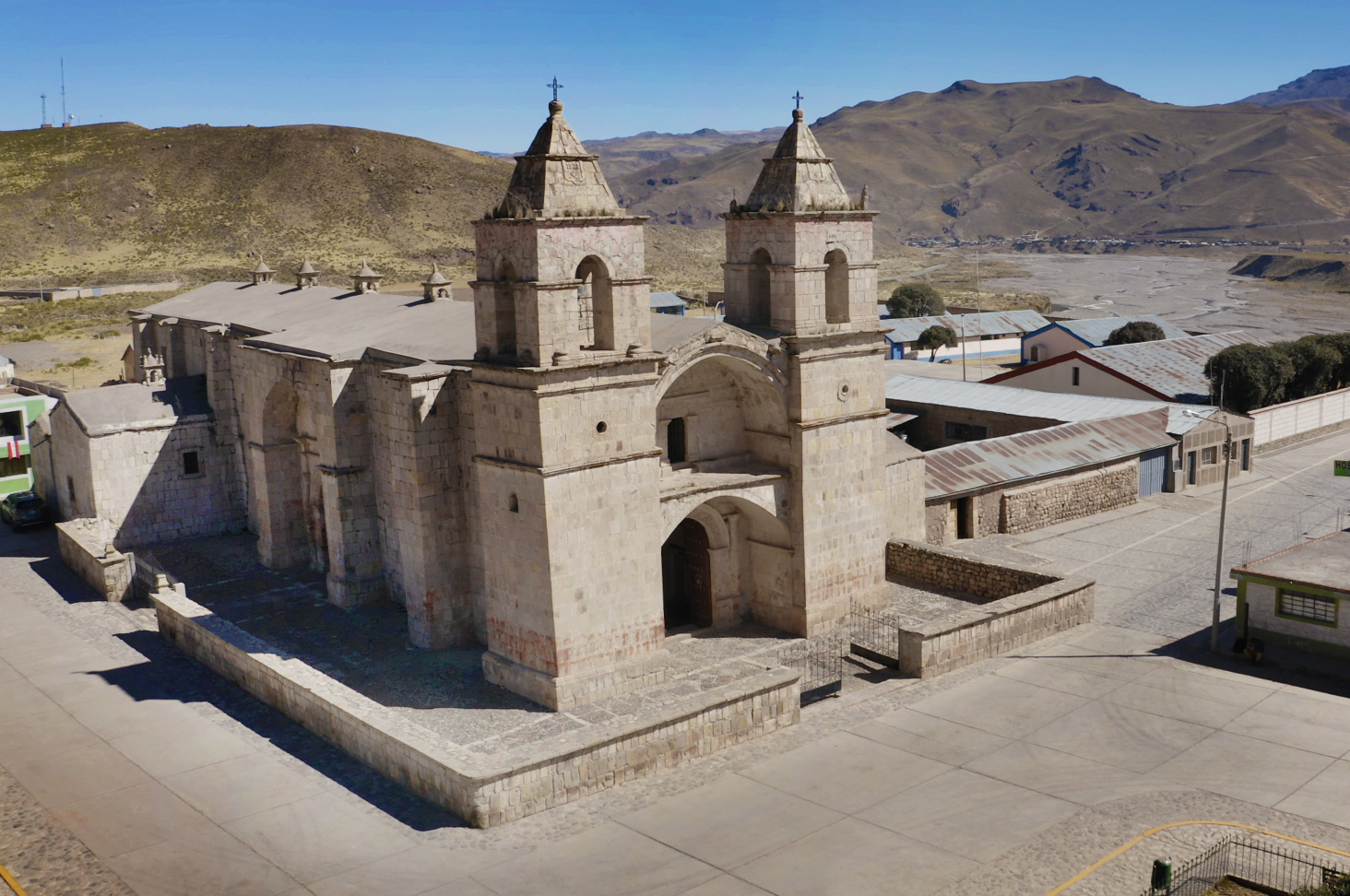
Iglesia Callalli de San Antonio de Padua

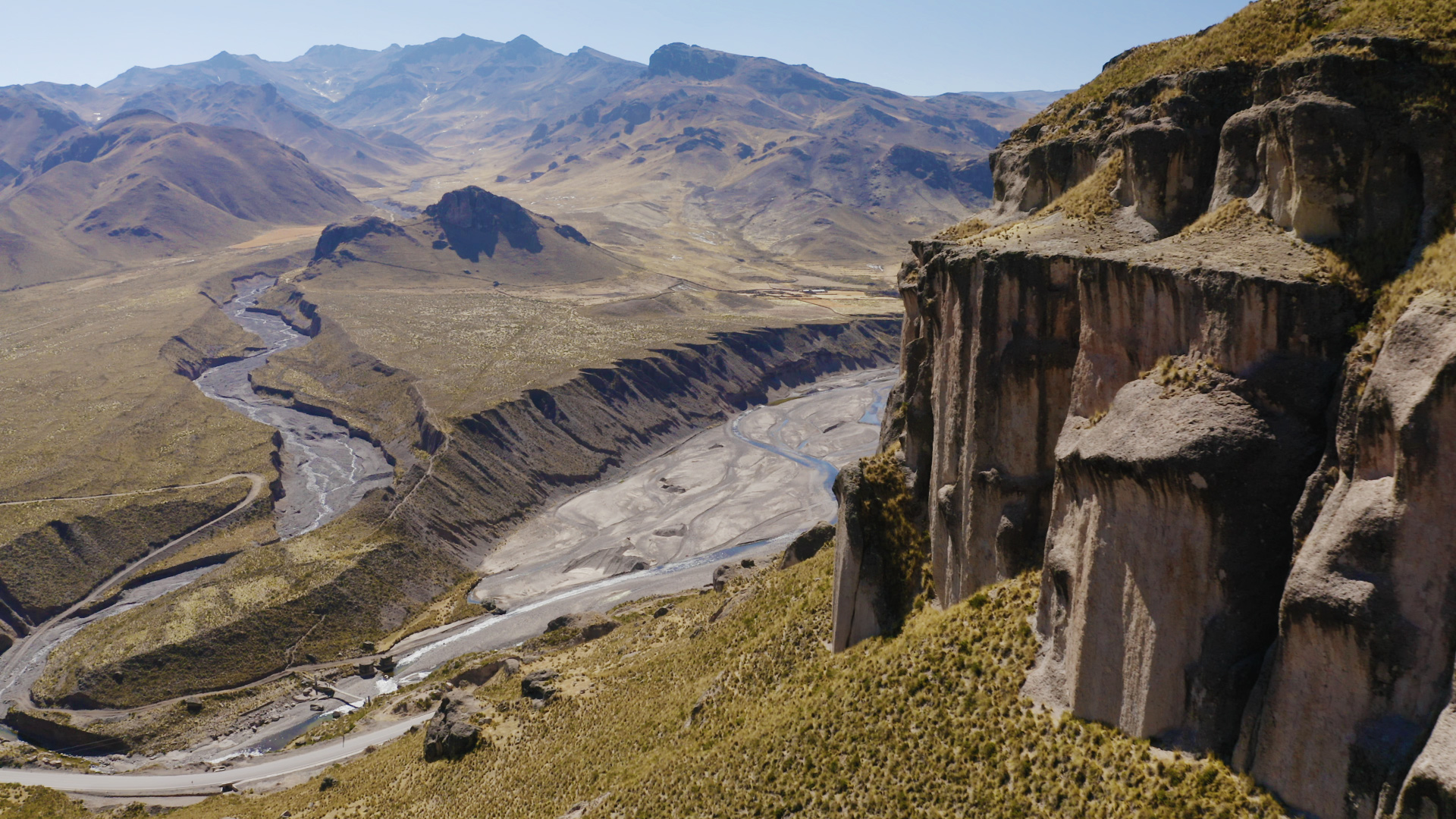
Rock formation a few minutes outside Callalli

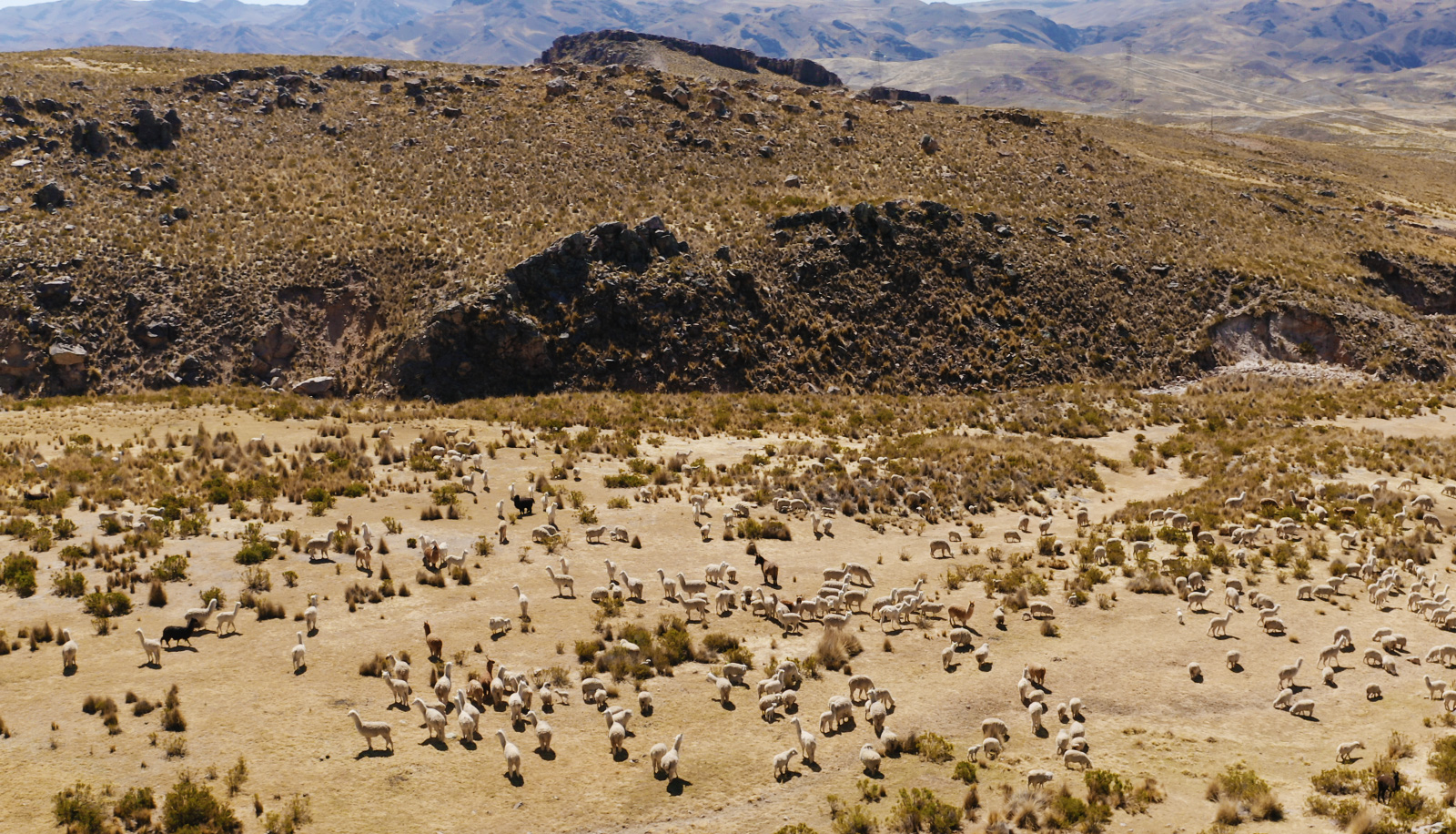
A herd of alpacas grazing outside the Mollepunko caves close to Callalli

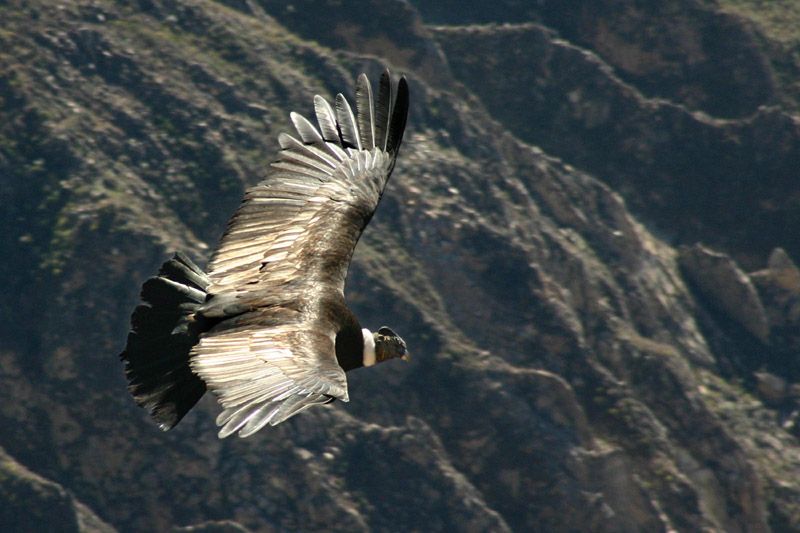
A Condor flying over the Colca Canyon

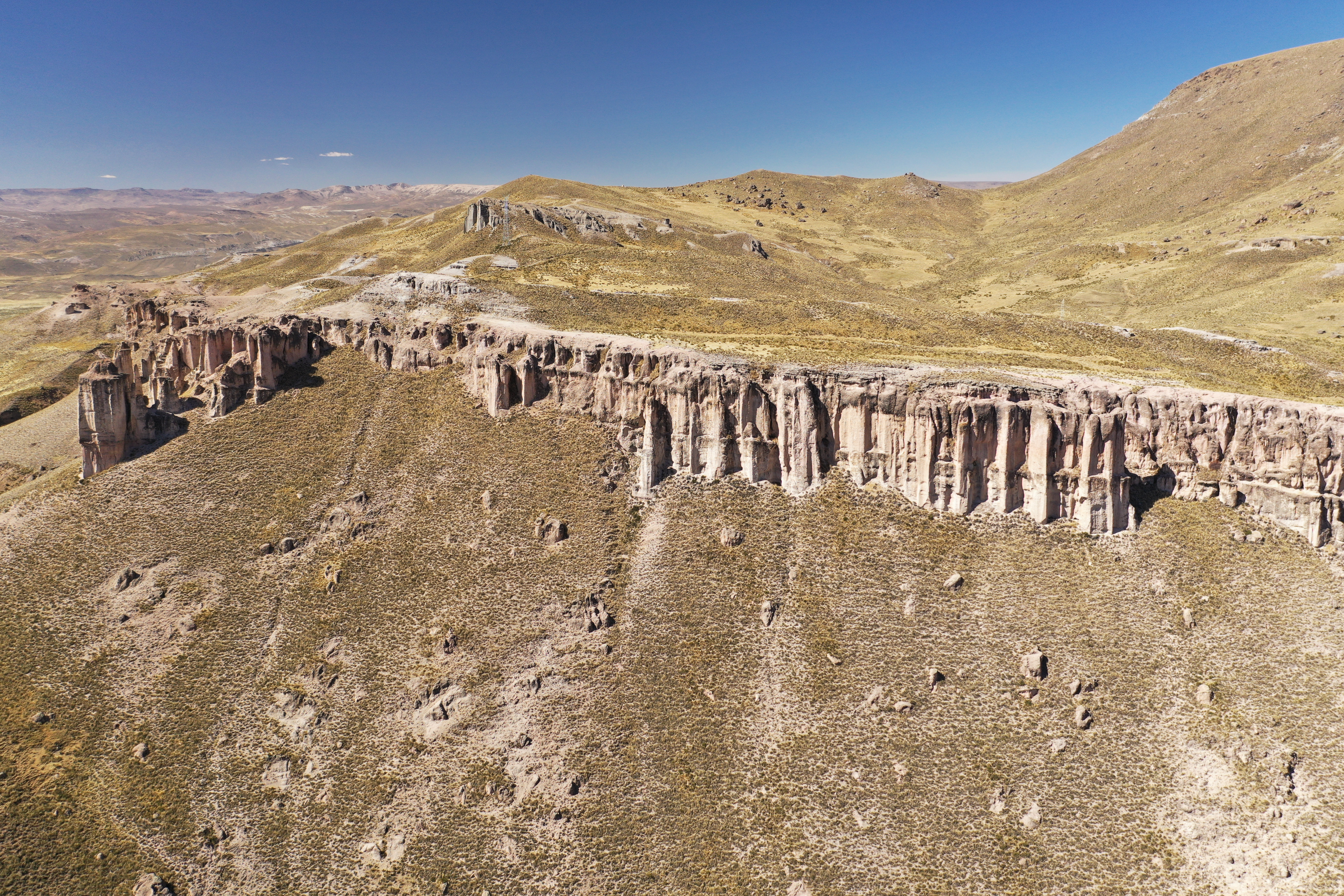
The "Enchanted Castles of Callalli" above Callalli

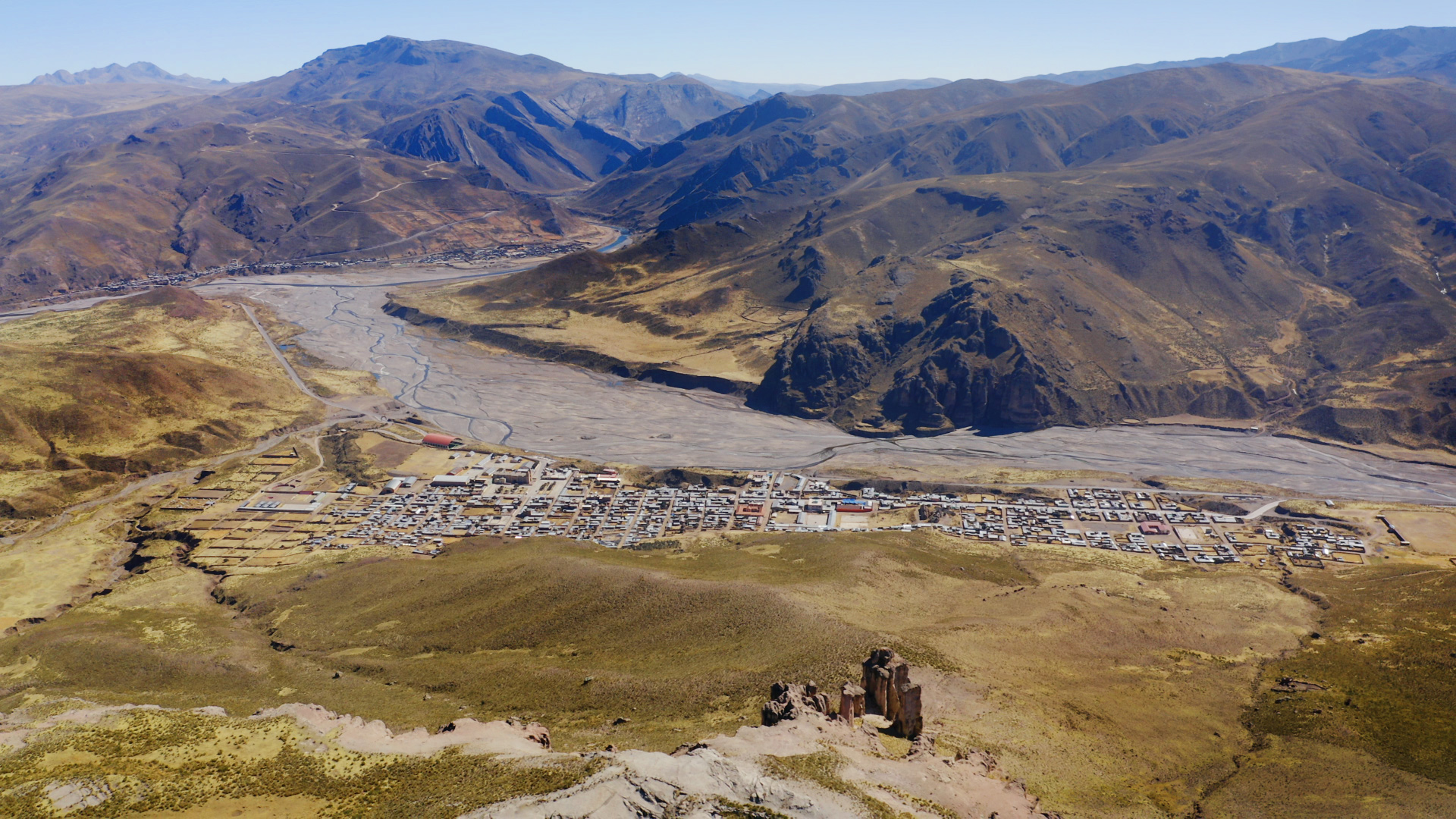
Callalli as seen from the air

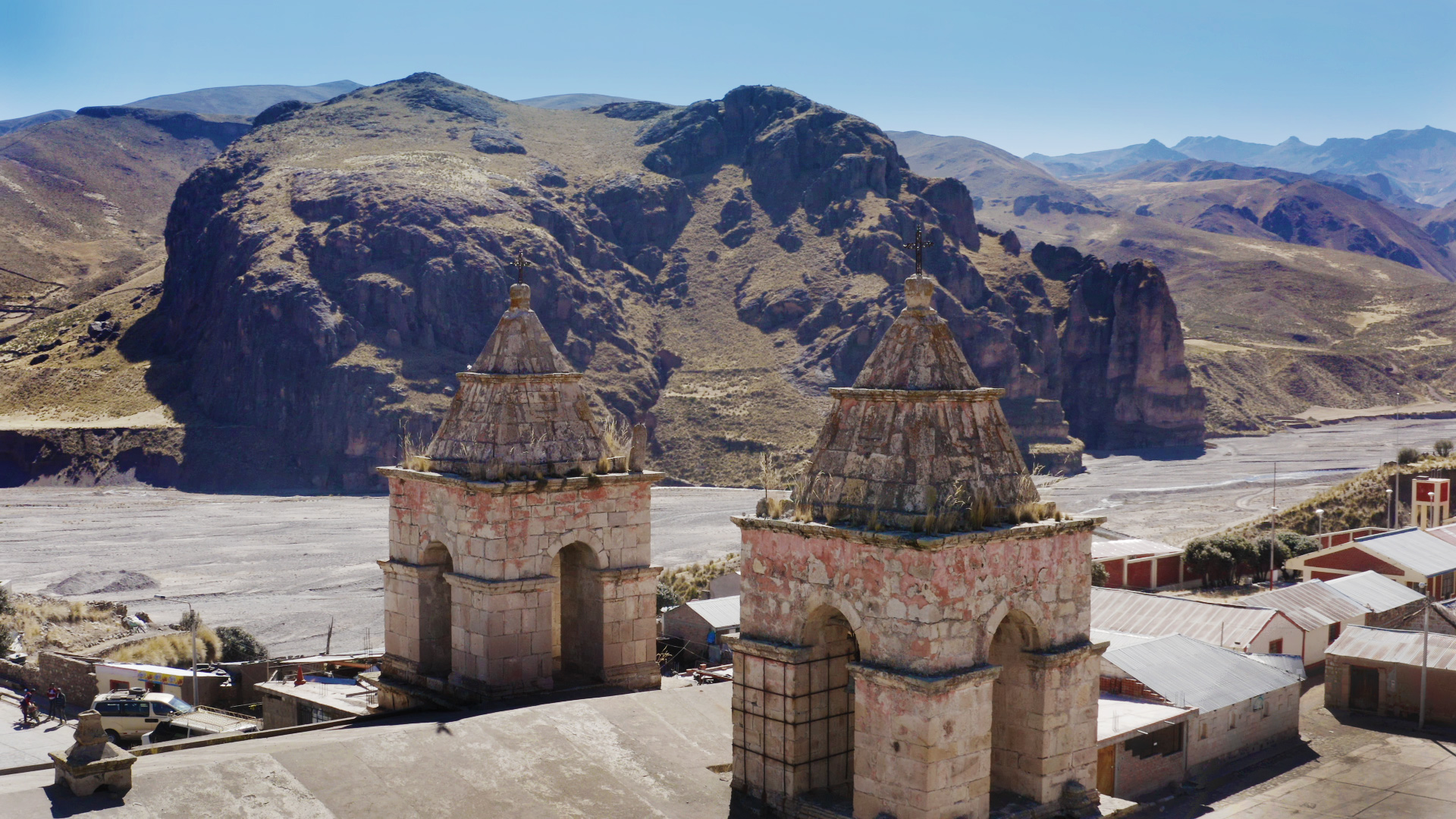
The Callalli Church with rock formation in the background

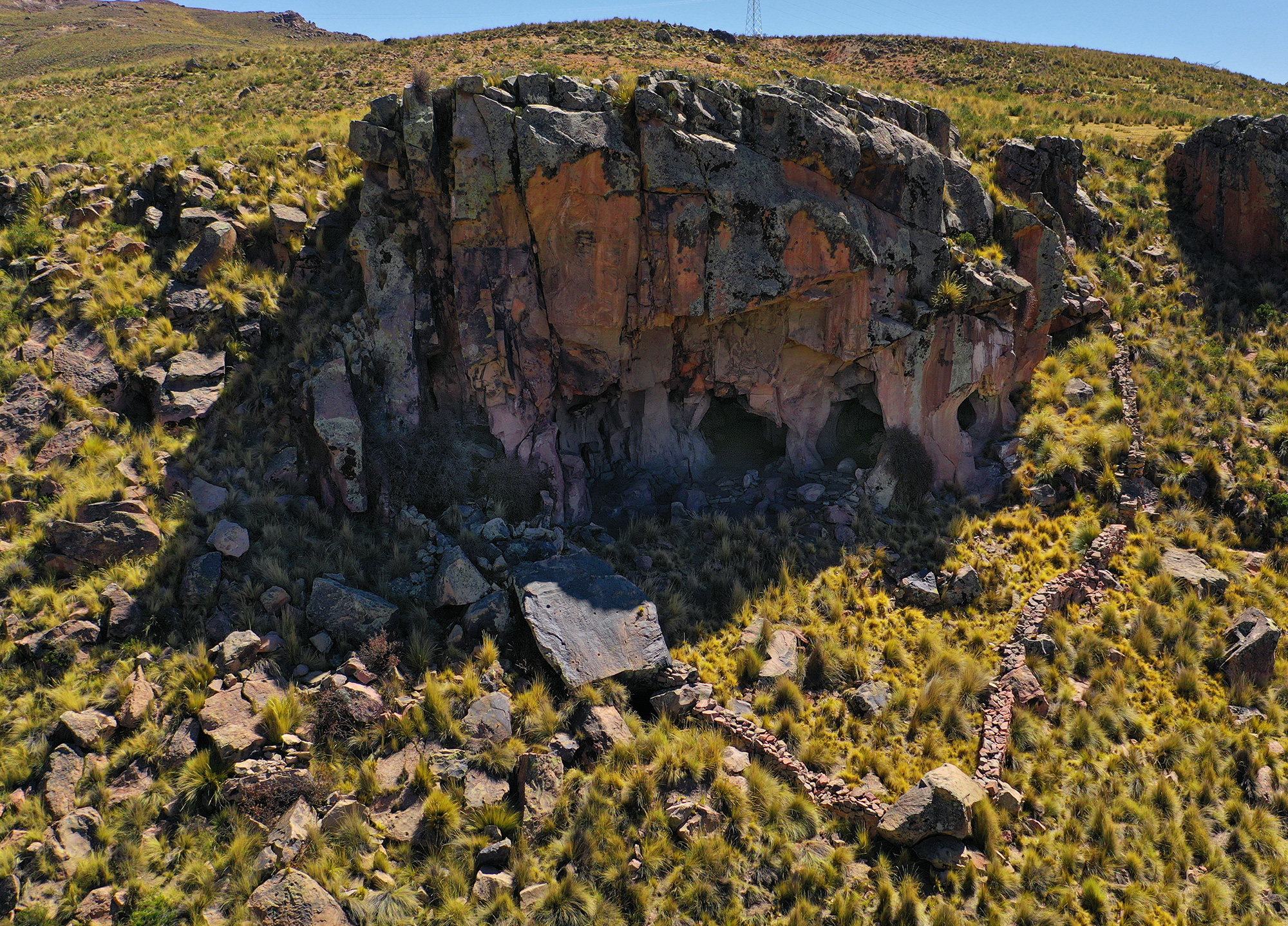
Mollepunko Caves outside Callalli in the Colca Canyon

== Ethnic groups ==
The people in the district are mainly indigenous citizens of Quechua descent. Quechua is the language which the majority of the population (62.06%) learnt to speak in childhood, 37.48% of the residents started speaking using the Spanish language (2007 Peru Census).
