= Chivay District =

Coordinates: 15.6366°S 71.6090°W

Chivay Chiway
- District
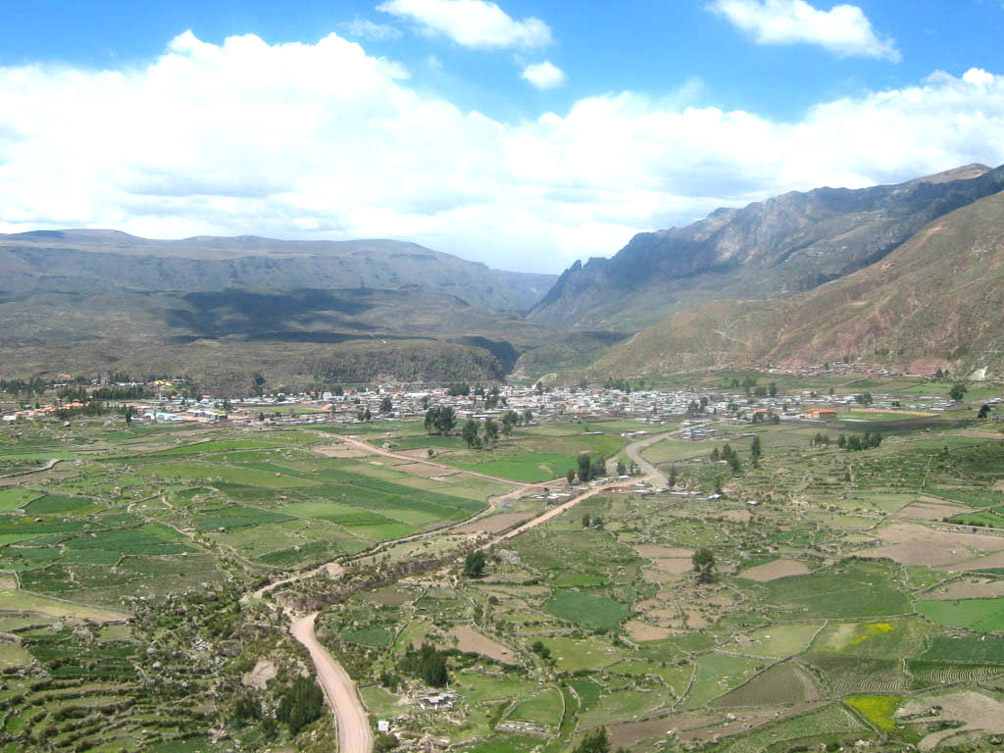
- Chivay, Colca Canyon
- Interactive map of Chivay
- Country: Peru
- Region: Arequipa
- Province: Caylloma
- Capital: Chivay

Government
  - Mayor: Jorge Modesto Cueva Tejada

Area
  - Total: 240.64 km^{2} (92.91 sq mi)
- Elevation: 3,635 m (11,926 ft)

Population (2005 census)
  - Total: 6,570
  - Density: 27.3/km^{2} (70.7/sq mi)
- Time zone: UTC-5 (PET)
- UBIGEO: 040501

Chivay District is one of twenty districts of the province Caylloma in Peru.

== Geography ==
One of the highest mountains of the district is Waran K'anthi at 5,426 m (17,802 ft). Other mountains are listed below:

- Ankachita
- Laymi
- Llallawi
- Mama Qucha
- Q'illu Q'illu
- Saylluta
- Sinawa
- Uyuni

== See also ==
- Uskallaqta
