= Uyu Uyu =

Archaeological site in Peru

- Location within Peru
- 15.6397°S 71.6701°W
- Location: Peru, Arequipa Region, Caylloma Province
- Region: Andes

Uyu Uyu (Aymara, uyu pen, yard, cemetery, the reduplication indicates that there is a group or a complex of something, "a complex of yards", Hispanicized spelling Uyo Uyo) is an archaeological site in Peru. It lies in the Arequipa Region, Caylloma Province, Yanque District, on the right bank of the Qullqa River.

== See also ==
- Uskallaqta
