= Paraccra (archaeological site) =

Archaeological site in Peru

- Interactive map of Paraccra
- 15°27′32.4″S 71°27′47.5″W
- Location: Peru, Arequipa Region, Caylloma Province
- Region: Andes

Paraccra (possibly from Aymara for a piece of land which is neither flat nor mountainous) is an archaeological site in the Andes of Peru on a mountain of the same name. It is situated in the Arequipa Region, Caylloma Province, Sibayo District, near the Colca River. The site contains towers, round houses and black walls.
