= Quehuisha (Peru) =

Mountain in Peru

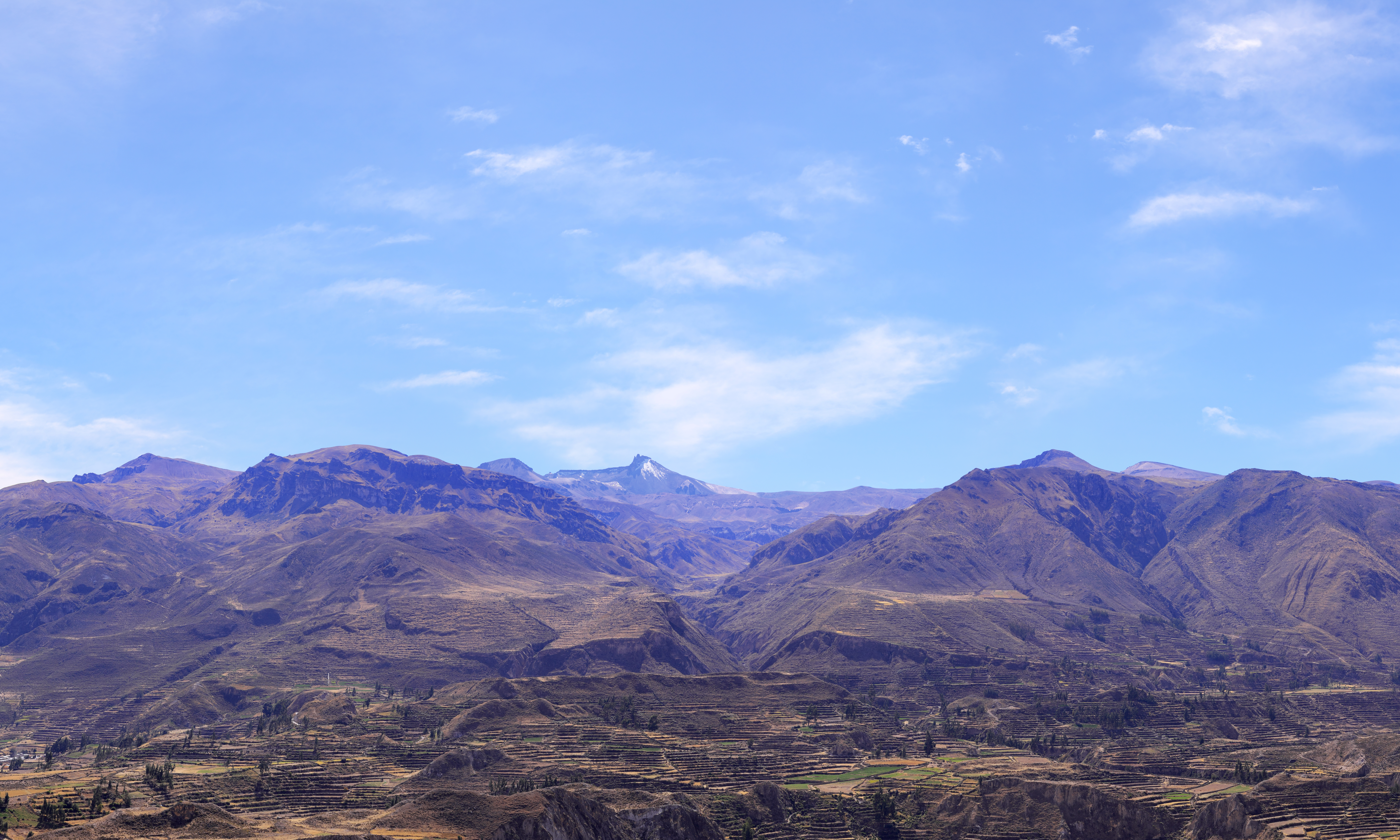
- The Callumayo valley leading to Quehuisha in the background (center)

Highest point
- Elevation: 5,514 m (18,091 ft)
- Coordinates: 15°31′14″S 71°45′33″W

Naming
- Language of name: Quechua

Geography
- Location within Peru
- Location: Peru, Arequipa Region
- Parent range: Andes, Chila

Quehuisha (possibly from Quechua for Amaranthus caudatus or for liver), Quehuicha, Queshihua, or Quihuisha is a mountain in the Chila mountain range in the Andes of Peru, about 5,514 metres (18,091 ft) high (according to another source 5,170 metres (16,962 ft)). It is located in the Arequipa Region, Caylloma Province, Lari District, west of the mountain Mismi.

The river Callumayo originates south of Quehuisha, between the small lakes Ticllacocha (possibly from Quechua for "two-colored lake") and Jatuncocha (possibly from Quechua for "big lake") near the little village Quihnisha. It flows to the south and ends in the Colca River .
