= Ananta (Arequipa) =

Mountain in Peru

- Location within Peru

Highest point
- Elevation: 5,240.1 m (17,192 ft)
- Coordinates: 15°48′46″S 71°40′57″W

Geography
- Location: Peru, Arequipa Region, Caylloma Province
- Parent range: Andes

Ananta is a mountain in the Arequipa Region in the Andes of Peru, about 5,240.1 metres (17,192 ft) high. It is situated in the Caylloma Province, on the border of the districts Achoma and Yanque. Ananta lies east of the dormant volcano Ampato and south-west of the mountain Warank'anthi.
