= Uskallaqta =

Archaeological site in Peru

- Location within Peru
- 15°40′8.7″S 71°36′57″W
- Location: Peru, Arequipa Region, Caylloma Province
- Region: Andes

Uskallaqta (Quechua uska poor, llaqta place (village, town, city, country, nation), other spellings Juscallacta, Uscallacta, Uskallacta) is an archaeological complex with stone tombs (chullpa) and rooms in Peru. It is situated in the Arequipa Region, Caylloma Province, Chivay District, southwest of Chivay.

== See also ==
- Uyu Uyu
