= Yanque District =

Coordinates: 15.6498°S 71.6620°W

Yanque
- District
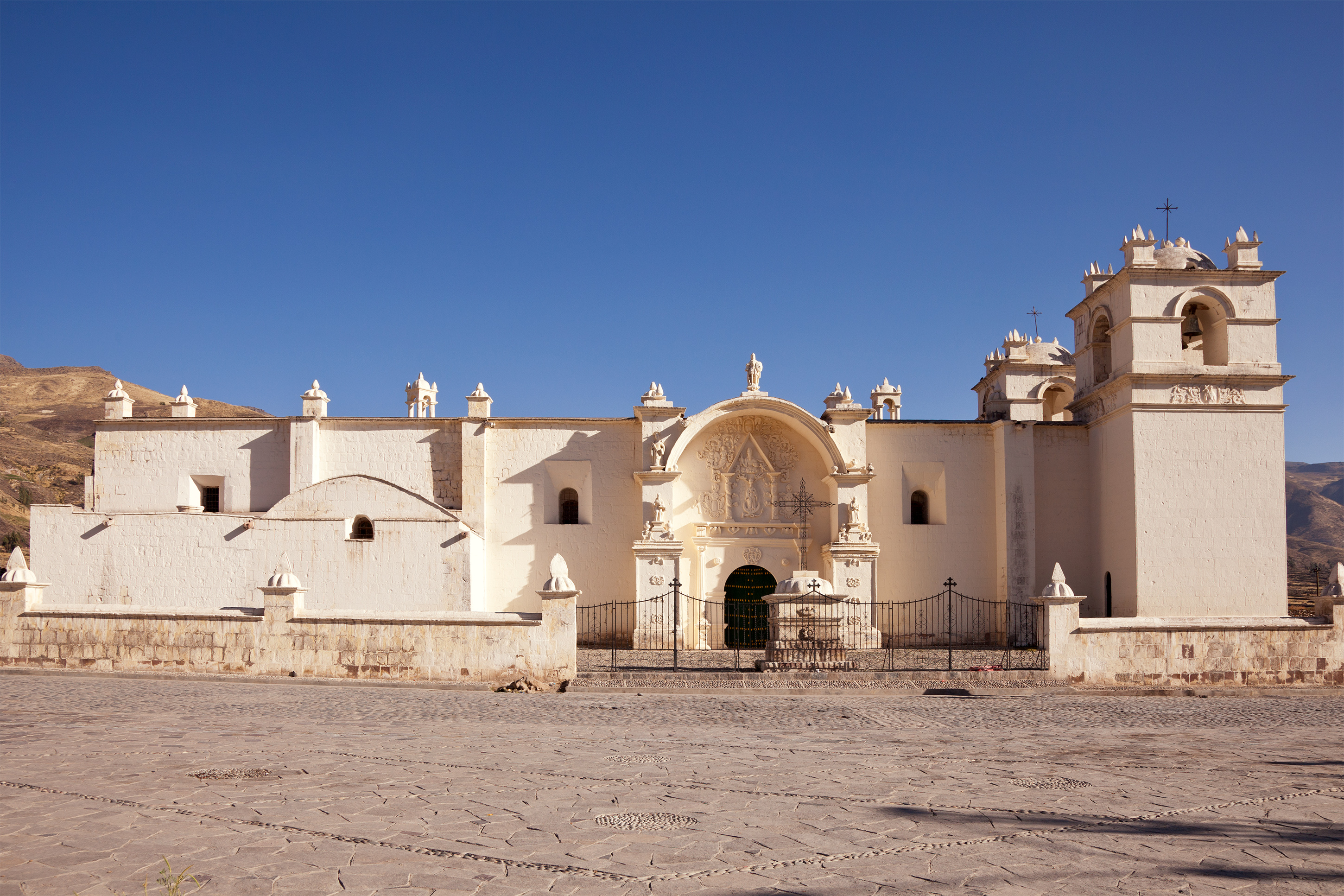
- Church in Yanque
- Interactive map of Yanque
- Country: Peru
- Region: Arequipa
- Province: Caylloma
- Capital: Yanque

Government
  - Mayor: Apolinario Sarayasi Ynca

Area
  - Total: 1,108.58 km^{2} (428.03 sq mi)
- Elevation: 3,417 m (11,211 ft)

Population (2005 census)
  - Total: 2,479
  - Density: 2.236/km^{2} (5.792/sq mi)
- Time zone: UTC-5 (PET)
- UBIGEO: 040519

Yanque District is one of twenty districts of the province Caylloma in Peru.

== Ethnic groups ==
The people in the district are mainly indigenous citizens of Quechua descent. Quechua is the language which the majority of the population (56.28%) learnt to speak in childhood, 43.13% of the residents started speaking using the Spanish language (2007 Peru Census).

== See also ==
- Ananta
- Uyu Uyu
- Warank'anthi
