= Callumayo =

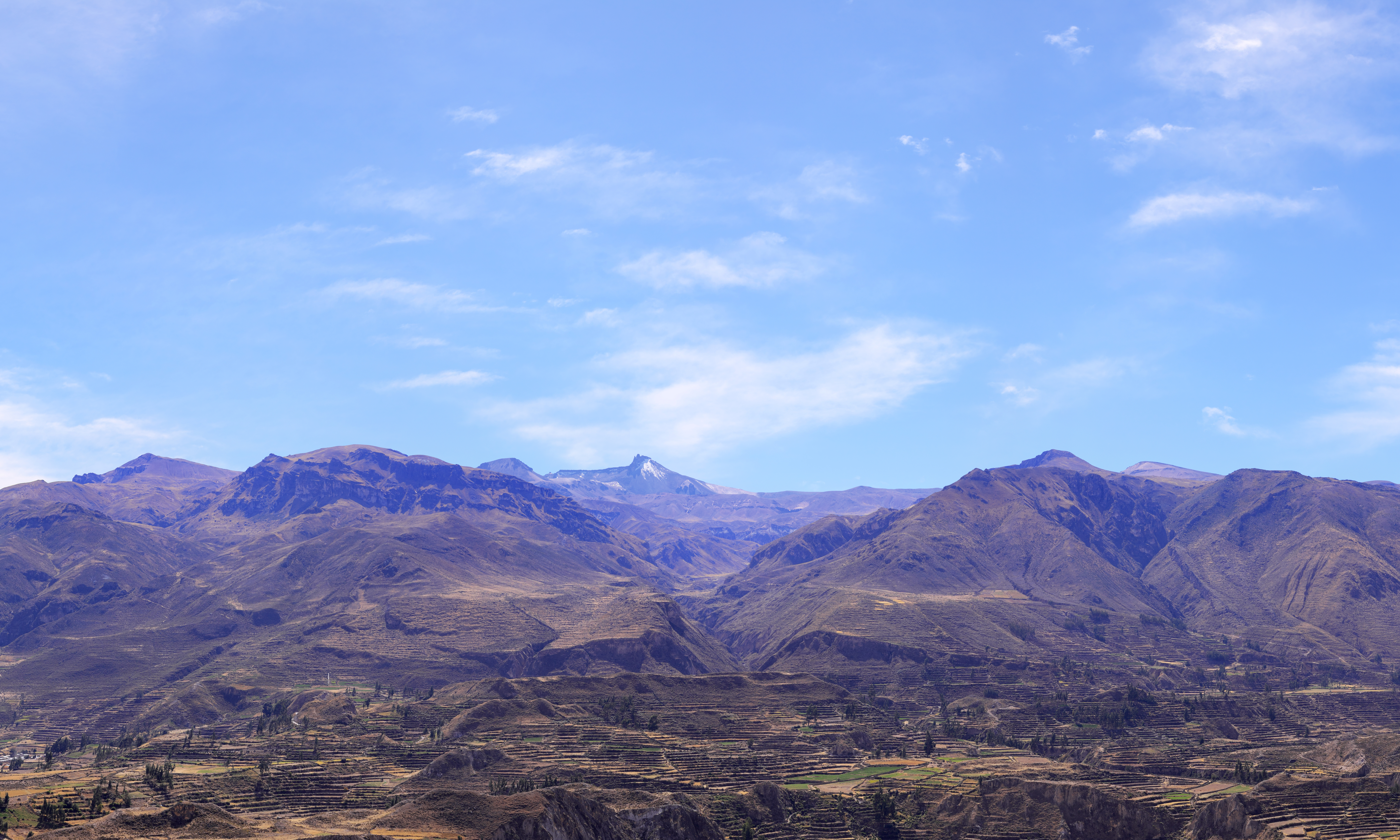
- The Callumayo valley with the mountain Quehuisha in the background
- Etymology: Quechua

Location
- Country: Peru
- Region: Arequipa Region

Physical characteristics
- Mouth: Colca River

Callumayo (possibly from Quechua qallu tongue, mayu river, "tongue river") is a river in the Andes of Peru located in the Arequipa Region, Caylloma Province, Lari District. It is a right tributary of the Colca River.

Callumayo originates in the Chila mountain range south of the mountain Quehuisha, between the small lakes Ticllacocha (possibly from Quechua for "two-colored lake") and Jatuncocha (possibly from Quechua for "big lake") near the little village Quihnisha. Its direction is mainly to the south as it flows along the villages Punahue and Yanitani. The confluence with the Colca River is south of the villages Madrigal and Lari.
