= Achoma District =

Coordinates: 15.6626°S 71.7024°W

Achoma Achuma
- District
- Interactive map of Achoma
- Country: Peru
- Region: Arequipa
- Province: Caylloma
- Capital: Achoma

Area
  - Total: 393.54 km^{2} (151.95 sq mi)
- Elevation: 3,450 m (11,320 ft)

Population (2005 census)
  - Total: 1,342
  - Density: 3.410/km^{2} (8.832/sq mi)
- Time zone: UTC-5 (PET)
- UBIGEO: 040502

Achoma District is one of twenty districts of the province Caylloma in Peru.

== See also ==
- Ananta
