= Chivay =

- Town
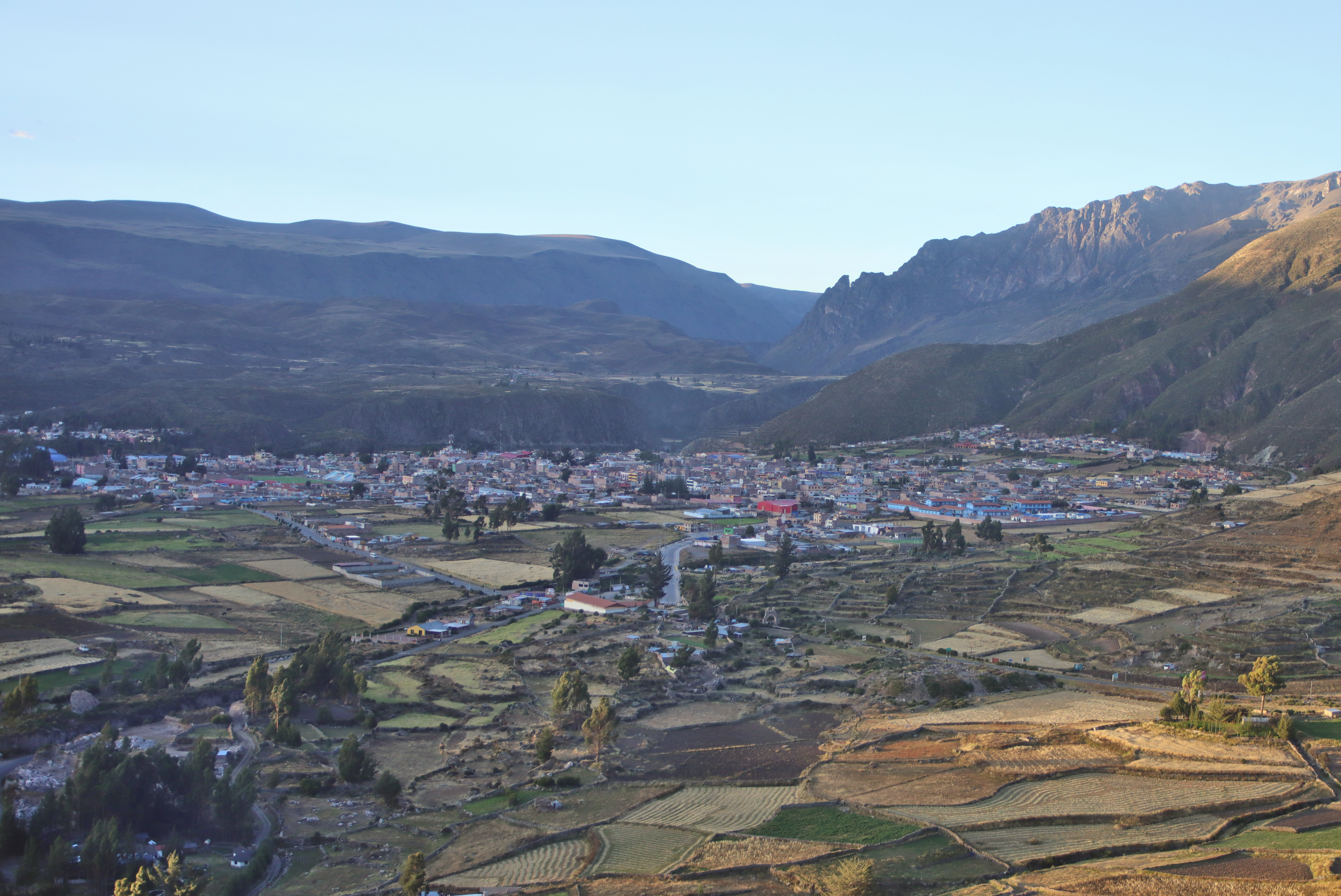
- View of Chivay

- Flag

- Location within Peru
- Coordinates: 15°38′S 71°36′W
- Country: Peru
- Region: Arequipa
- Province: Caylloma
- District: Chivay

Government
  - Mayor: Jorge Modesto Cueva Tejada
- Elevation: 3,635 m (11,926 ft)

Population
  - Total: 5,000
- Time zone: UTC-5 (PET)

Chivay is a town in the Colca valley, capital of the Caylloma province in the Arequipa region, Peru. Located at about 3,600 m above sea level (12,000 ft), it lies upstream of the renowned Colca Canyon. It has a central town square and an active market. Ten km to the east, and 1,500 metres above the town of Chivay lies the Chivay obsidian source.

Thermal springs are located 3 km from town; a number of heated pools have been constructed. A stone "Inca" bridge crosses the Colca River ravine, just to the north of the town. The town is a popular staging point for tourists visiting Condor Cross or Cruz Del Condor, where condors can be seen catching thermal uplifts a few kilometres downstream.

== Climate ==
Chivay has a subtropical highland climate (Köppen: Cwb) characterized by mild days, cold nights, and distinct wet and dry seasons.

The total annual precipitation is around 450 millimetres (18 in). Chivay receives the majority of its precipitation during the wet season, which spans from December to March. The dry season, from May to November, sees significantly reduced precipitation.

Daytime temperatures are relatively constant throughout the year, with all months having average high temperatures close to 20 °C (68 °F). The dry season has significantly colder nights than the wet season, with average low temperatures below freezing from May to August. Low temperatures average above 4 °C (39 °F) during the wet season.

Climate data for Chivay (1991–2020)
Month	Jan	Feb	Mar	Apr	May	Jun	Jul	Aug	Sep	Oct	Nov	Dec	Year
Mean daily maximum °C (°F)	19.0 (66.2)	18.6 (65.5)	19.1 (66.4)	19.8 (67.6)	19.6 (67.3)	19.1 (66.4)	19.0 (66.2)	20.1 (68.2)	21.0 (69.8)	21.5 (70.7)	21.6 (70.9)	20.6 (69.1)	19.9 (67.8)
Mean daily minimum °C (°F)	4.5 (40.1)	4.7 (40.5)	4.0 (39.2)	2.6 (36.7)	−0.2 (31.6)	−1.7 (28.9)	−1.8 (28.8)	−0.8 (30.6)	0.9 (33.6)	1.9 (35.4)	2.4 (36.3)	3.7 (38.7)	1.7 (35.1)
Average precipitation mm (inches)	115.0 (4.53)	116.9 (4.60)	86.2 (3.39)	29.8 (1.17)	2.9 (0.11)	2.3 (0.09)	3.5 (0.14)	3.0 (0.12)	7.6 (0.30)	10.4 (0.41)	13.9 (0.55)	54.2 (2.13)	445.7 (17.55)
Source: NOAA

== Gallery ==
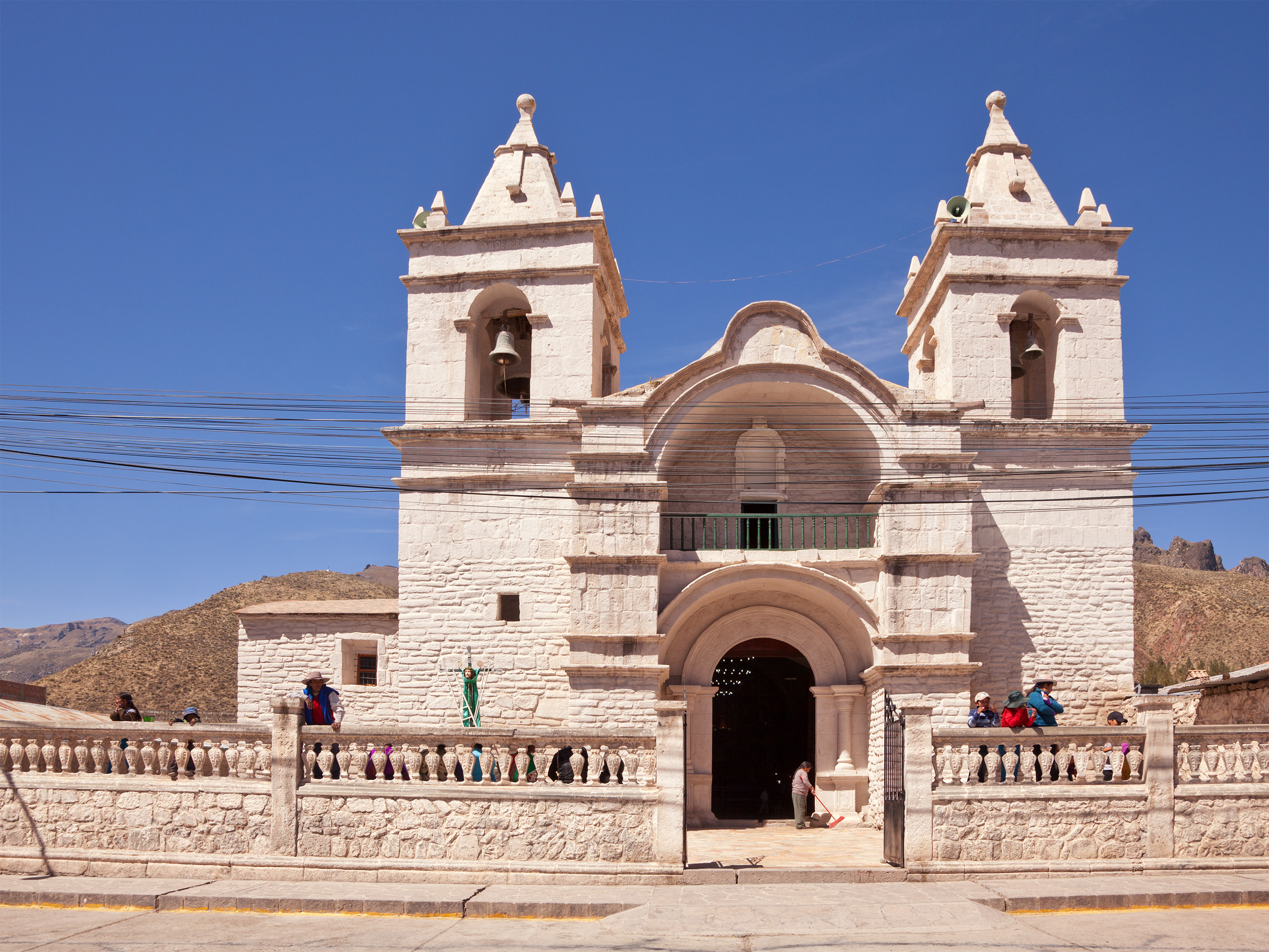
Church in Chivay

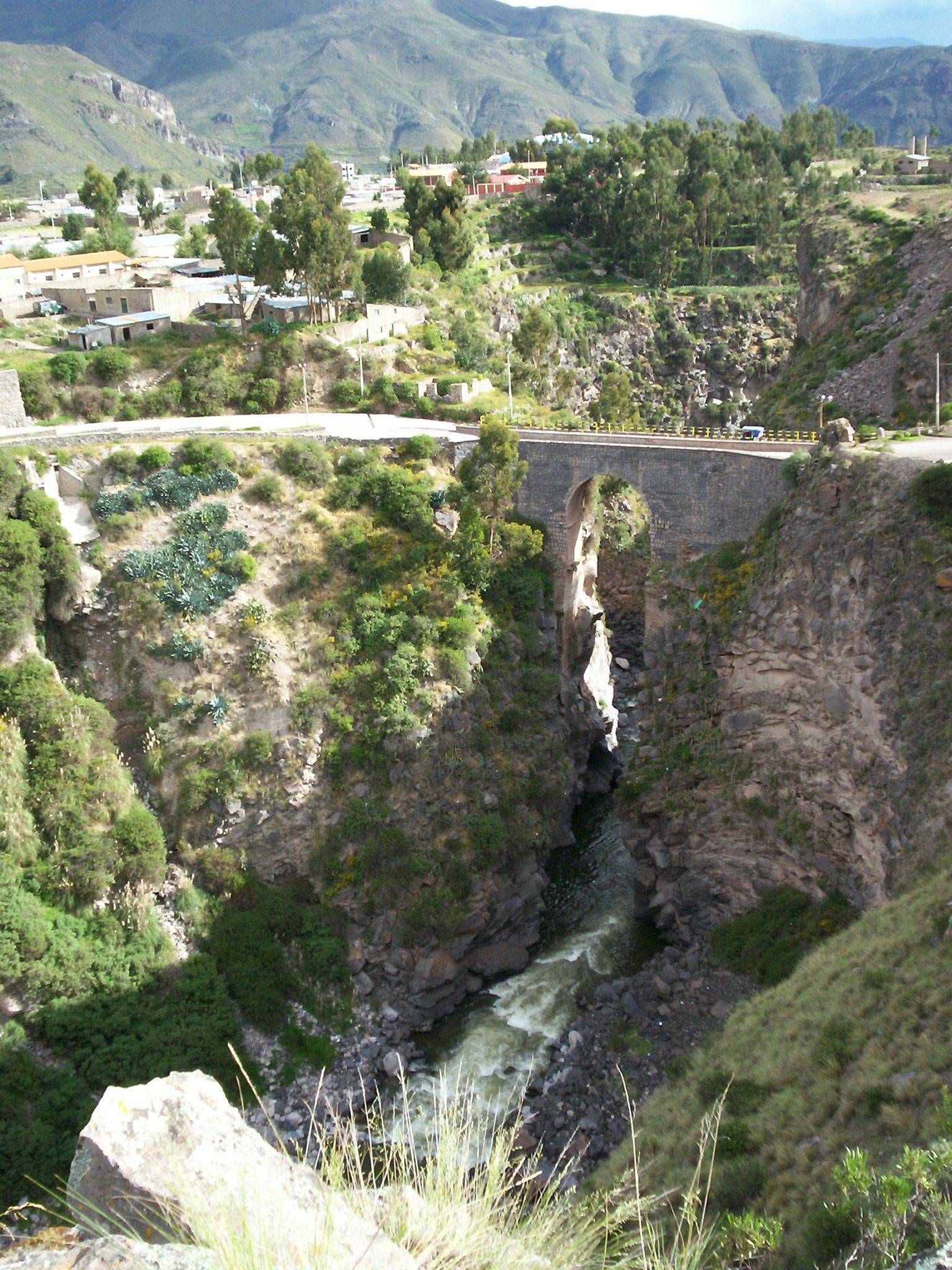
"Puente Inca" near Chivay

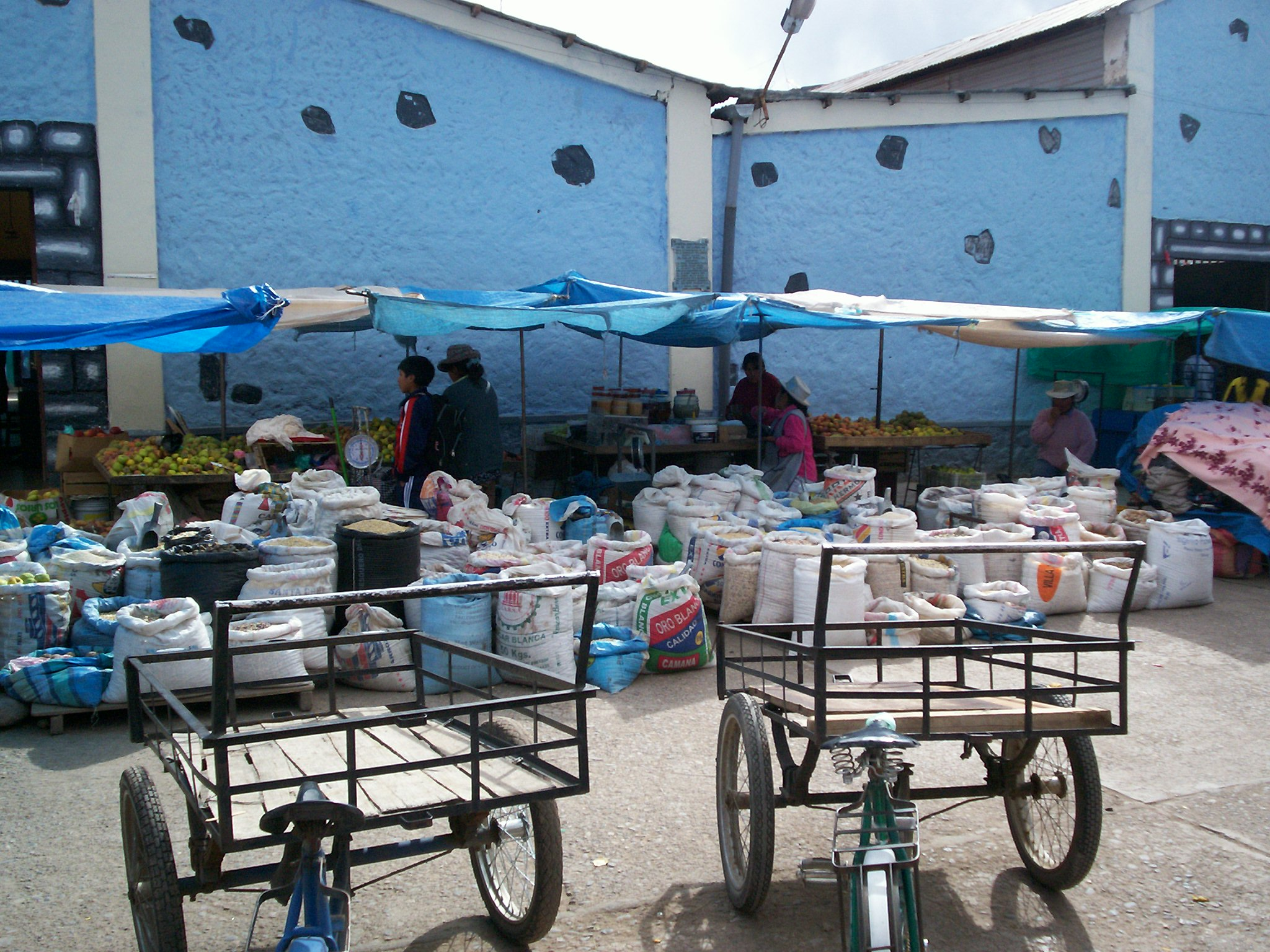
Chivay market

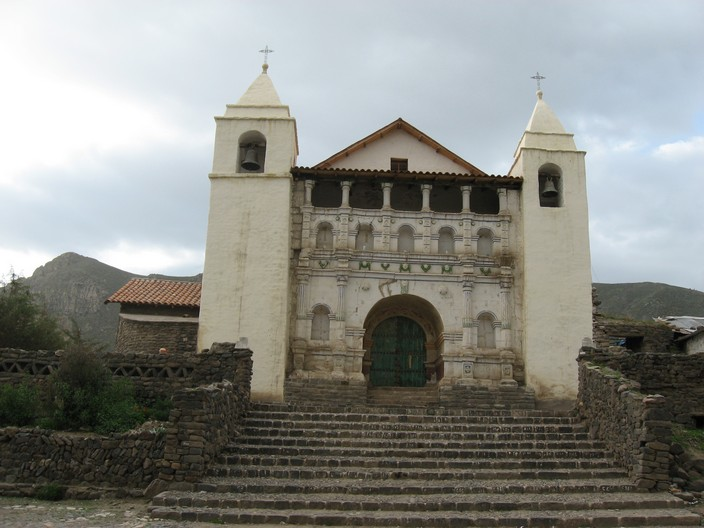
Temple Santiago Apostol de Caporaque in Chivay

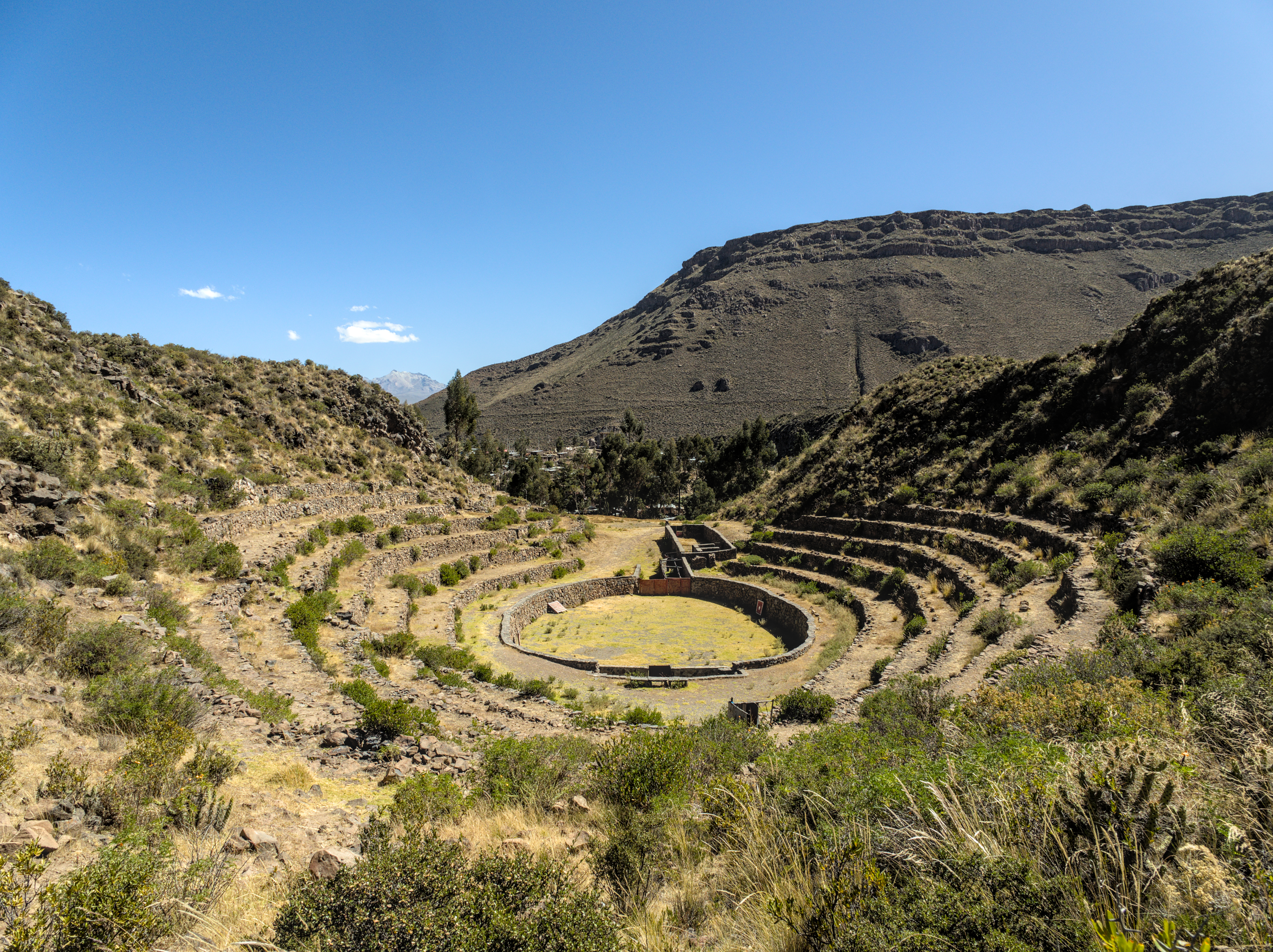
Ruins of a ring of terraces often incorrectly called a "bullring" or amphitheater; part of the Chivay Ruinas park overlooking Chivay, north side of Rio Colca

== See also ==
- Ankachita
- Q'illu Q'illu
- Uskallaqta
- Warank'anthi
