= Huarancante =

Mountain in Peru

- Location within Peru

Highest point
- Elevation: 5,426 m (17,802 ft)
- Coordinates: 15°43′49.44″S 71°31′30.36″W

Geography
- Location: Peru, Arequipa Region
- Parent range: Andes

Huarancante (possibly from Aymara) is a mountain in the Andes of Peru, about 5,426 metres (17,802 ft) high. It is situated in the Arequipa Region, Caylloma Province, on the border of the districts Callalli, Chivay and Yanque, southeast of Chivay. Huarancante lies southwest of the mountain Jello Jello.
