= Jello Jello =

Mountain in Peru

- Location within Peru

Highest point
- Elevation: 5,220 m (17,130 ft)
- Coordinates: 15°43′0.12″S 71°30′30.6″W

Geography
- Location: Peru, Arequipa Region
- Parent range: Andes

Jello Jello is a mountain in the Andes of Peru, about 5,220 metres (17,126 ft) high. It is situated in the Arequipa Region, Caylloma Province, in the districts Callalli and Chivay. Jello Jello lies northeast of a higher mountain named Huarancante. There is a small lake northwest of the mountain named Jello Jello.

The name is possibly from Aymara and Quechua q'illu yellow, the reduplication indicates that there is a group or a complex of something, "a complex of yellow", q'illu q'illu a plant (Berberis bumaelifolia),
