= Colca River =

River in Peru

Colca
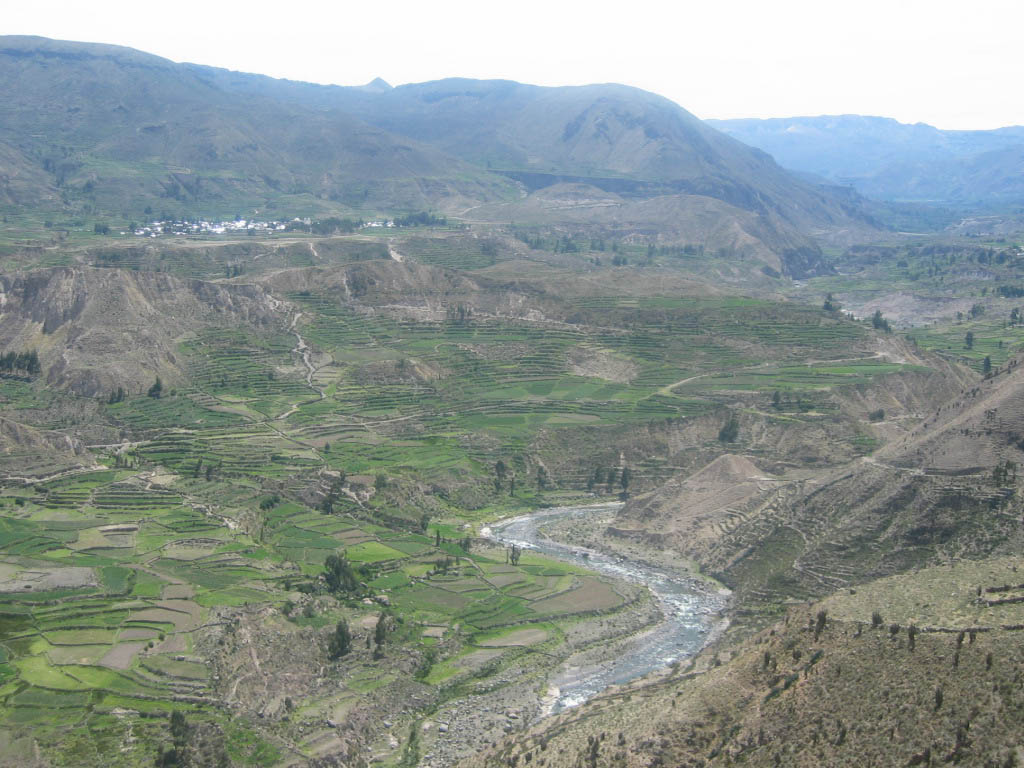
- Colca valley

- Location of mouth
- Etymology: Quechua

Location
- Country: Peru
- Region: Arequipa

Physical characteristics
- Source
  - location: Callalli District
- Mouth: Pacific Ocean
  - location: Camaná District
  - coordinates: 16°37′52″S 72°45′51″W

Basin features
- Tributaries
  - left: Asirumayu (Asirumayo), Anchapara
  - right: P'ikumayu (Picomayo), Qantumayu, Pirwamayu (Pirhuamayo), Pirwa (Perhua), Qullpa Pallqa Mayu (Collpa Palca Mayo), Kunturuma (Condoroma), Pilluni, Qallumayu, Antamayu

Colca River (possibly from Quechua qullqa deposit) which downstream is called Majes and Camaná is a Peruvian river in the Arequipa Region that flows deep in the rugged Andes of southern Peru. It originates south-east of the village Janq'u Lakaya (Ancolaccaya) in the Callalli District of the Caylloma Province. On its way from Chivay to Cabanaconde it flows through one of the deepest canyons of the world known as the Colca Canyon. Near the town of Camaná the river empties into the Pacific Ocean.

== See also ==
- Majes-Siguas
