= Colca Canyon =

Natural canyon in Peru

Coordinates: 15°35′50″S 71°52′45″W

- Canyon
- Colca Valley

- Location within Peru
- Coordinates
- Location: Peru
- Water bodies: Colca River

Dimensions
  - Length: 70 km (43 mi)
  - Depth: 3,270 m (10,730 ft)

The Colca Canyon is a canyon of the Colca River in southern Peru, located about 160 kilometres (99 mi) northwest of Arequipa. With a depth of about 3,270 metres (10,730 ft), it is one of the deepest canyons in the world. Its length is about 70 kilometres (43 mi). The Colca Valley is a colorful Andean valley with pre-Inca rooted inhabitants, and towns founded in Spanish colonial times, still inhabited by people of the Collagua and Cabana cultures. The local people maintain their ancestral traditions and continue to cultivate the pre-Inca stepped terraces, called andenes.

It is Peru's third most-visited tourist destination, with about 120,000 visitors annually.

== History ==
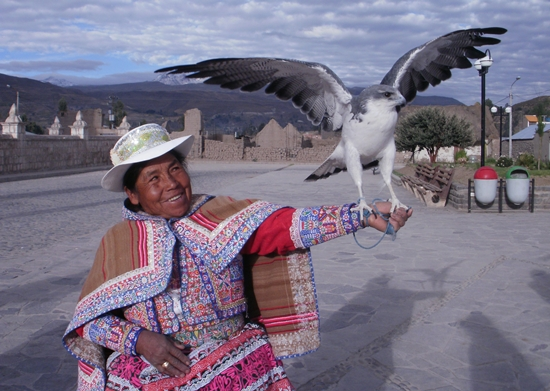
Woman with a tamed hawk in Yanque, one of the three main tourist towns of the Colca Canyon

The Quechua-speaking Cabanas, probably descended from the Wari culture, and the Aymara-speaking Collaguas, who moved to the area from the Lake Titicaca region, inhabited the valley in the pre-Inca era. The Inca probably arrived in the Colca Valley around 1320 AD, and established their dominion through marriage, rather than through warfare. The Spaniards, under Gonzalo Pizarro, arrived in 1540, and in the 1570s the Spanish viceroy Francisco de Toledo ordered the inhabitants throughout the former Inca Empire to leave their scattered dwellings and to move to a series of centrally located settlements in a process called "Reductions". These settlements remain the principal towns of the valley. Franciscan missionaries built the first chapel in the valley in 1565, and the first church in 1569. The tribe known as "Los Collaguas" lived in the high part of the valley of Colca, in which when members of their tribe died they would dig a hole along the steep rocky valley mountain and mark it with red paint. The faint red stains can still be seen as one drives along the valley at the very top of the rocky valley mountains.

No passable roads existed between Arequipa and Chivay until the 1940s when a road was completed to serve the silver and copper mines of the region. More roads were built in the 1970s and 1980s by the Majes Hydroelectric Project, a program to divert water from the Colca River to irrigate crops in the Majes region. Access today is usually via Arequipa.

In May 1981, the Polish Canoandes rafting expedition, led by Andrzej Pietowski, made the first descent of the river below Cabanaconde and proclaimed the possibility of its being the world's deepest canyon. It was so recognized by the Guinness Book of Records in 1984, and a National Geographic article in January 1993 repeated the claim. A joint Polish-Peruvian "Cañon del Colca 2005" expedition verified the altitudes of the river and the surrounding heights via GPS.

== Geography ==
Colca-Arequipa 14 plains of Majes, it is known as the Majes River, and then is known as the Camaná before reaching the Pacific Ocean at the town of that name. The Majes River was believed by the Incas to flow directly into the Milky Way. For this reason, they often put sacrifices and gifts to the gods in the river for it to flow to them. Within the province of Caylloma it is known as the "Colca Valley" between Callalli and Pinchollo/Madrigal. Down to Huambo it is known as the Colca Canyon.

The base of the canyon is about 2000 metres above sea level and its rim is about 3000–4000 metres above sea level). The headwaters of the valley are higher than 4,000 meters above sea level and are only used for the livestock. As the elevation lowers, the ecology changes to an agriculture zone at around 3,000 meters above sea level. It is there that the valley then becomes the Colca canyon. The canyon stretches 100 km and plunges down 3,400 meters.

The town of Chivay is located at the midpoint of the Colca valley. Above Chivay, at an elevation of 3,500 metres (11,500 ft), agriculture gives way to livestock raising, principally alpacas and llamas, with some sheep and dairy cattle as well. Below Chivay the valley presents intensely terraced landscapes, continuing for many kilometers downstream. Within the deepening valley downriver, a series of small villages is spread out over the approximately 56 kilometres (35 mi) between Chivay and the village of Cabanaconde. The canyon reaches its greatest depth in the region of Huambo, where the river has an elevation of 1,066 metres (3,497 ft). In contrast, 24 kilometres (15 mi) to the southeast of Cabanaconde rises the 6,288 metres (20,630 ft) high Ampato, a snow-capped extinct volcano.

== People ==
Colca is an inter-Andean valley populated and developed by three ethnic groups: the Kollowas, the Cabanas, and the Ccaccatapay.

- The Kollawas occupied the eastern region of the river basin
- The Cabanas were in the eastern region of the Colca river
- The Ccaccatapay lived in the deepest area of the center of the Colca River canyon in what today is the Tapay district.

They were great livestock herders, farmers and made irrigation ditches. However, there are also remains of prehistoric cultures and the Incas in that area.

Apart from its rich agriculture, its churches have notable architecture and valuable pieces of religious art. This artisanship shows the culture and traditions of each one of its communities.

In the caves found in the Colca Valley there are paintings and carvings that date back more than 7,000 years. These carvings depict scenes of hunting, llamas, foxes, human figures, representations of the stars like the sun, the Southern Cross, birds, and many other figures. These drawings show the passing of time and the various settlements which during thousands of years left footprints of their existence.

== Attractions ==
The canyon is home to the Andean condor (Vultur gryphus), a species that has been the focus of worldwide conservation efforts. The condors can be seen at close range as they fly past the canyon walls, and are a popular attraction. The Andean Condor typically lives about 60–70 years, and has a wingspan of about 2.1–2.7 metres (7–9 ft). It is commonly referred to as the "Eternity Bird," as the bird is a symbol of long life and eternity. 'Cruz del Condor' is a popular tourist stop to view the condors. At this point the canyon floor is 1,200 metres (3,900 ft) below the rim of the canyon.

Other notable bird species present in the Colca include the giant hummingbird, the largest member of the hummingbird family, as well as the Andean goose, Chilean flamingo, and mountain caracara. Animals include vizcacha, a rabbit-sized relative of the chinchilla, zorrino, deer, fox, and vicuña, the wild ancestor of the alpaca.

The La Calera natural hot springs are located at Chivay, the biggest town in the Colca Canyon. Other hot springs, some developed for tourist use, are dotted throughout the valley and canyon. Archeological sites include the Caves of Mollepunko above Callalli where rock art (said to be 6,000 years old) depicts the domestication of the alpaca. The mummy of Paraqra, above Sibayo; the Fortaleza de Chimpa, a reconstructed mountaintop citadel that looks down on Madrigal; ruins of pre-Hispanic settlements throughout the valley; and many others.

The most distant source of the Amazon River is accessible from the Colca valley via Tuti, a one-day trip to a spring at 5,120 metres (16,800 ft), where snowmelt from the Mismi bursts from a rock face. Other attractions include the Infiernillo Geyser, on the flanks of the volcano Hualca Hualca, which is accessible on foot, horseback, or mountain bicycle, and a number of casas vivenciales where tourists can stay with a local family in their home and share in their daily activities.

Cultural attractions include the Wititi festival in Chivay, named as a "cultural heritage" of Peru. The Colca is also well known for crafts: goods knitted from baby alpaca fiber and a unique form of embroidery that adorns skirts (polleras), hats, vests, and other items of daily wear and use. Autocolca, the Autonomous Authority of Colca and Annexes, was created by law in 1986, and is responsible for tourism promotion and management in the Colca Valley.

== Gallery ==
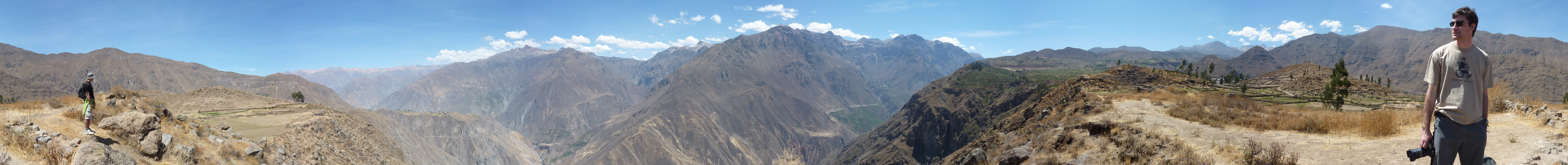
Panoramic view of the Colca Canyon from Achachiua Mirador, near Cabanaconde
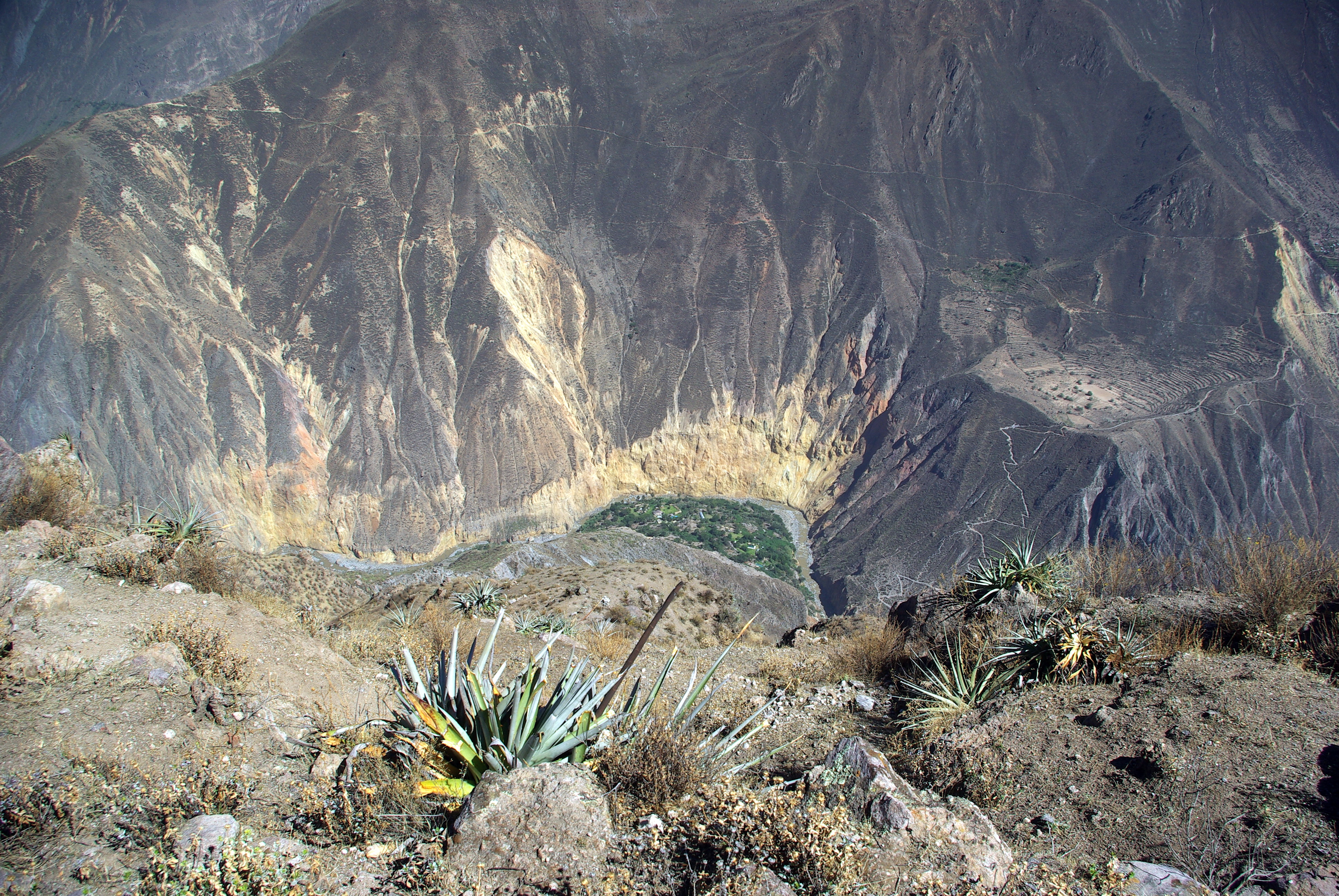
At the bottom of the canyon, near Cabanaconde, is an "Oasis" with several tourist resorts.

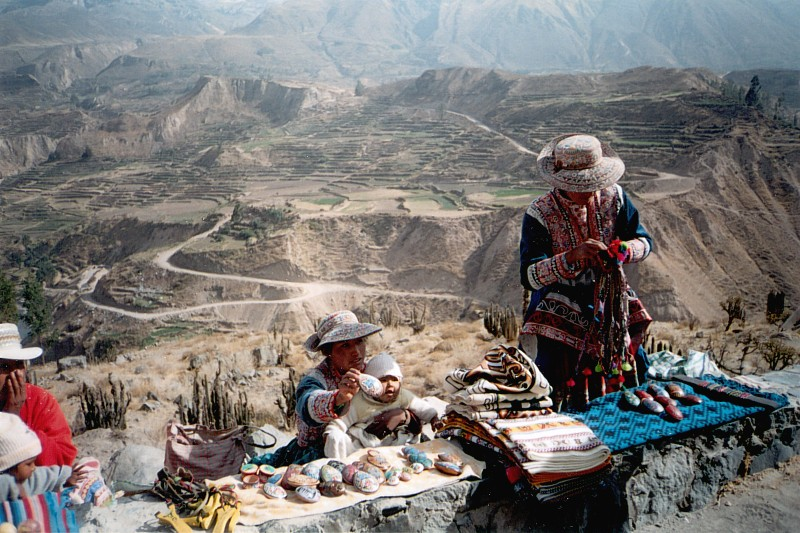
Souvenir sellers overlooking the canyon

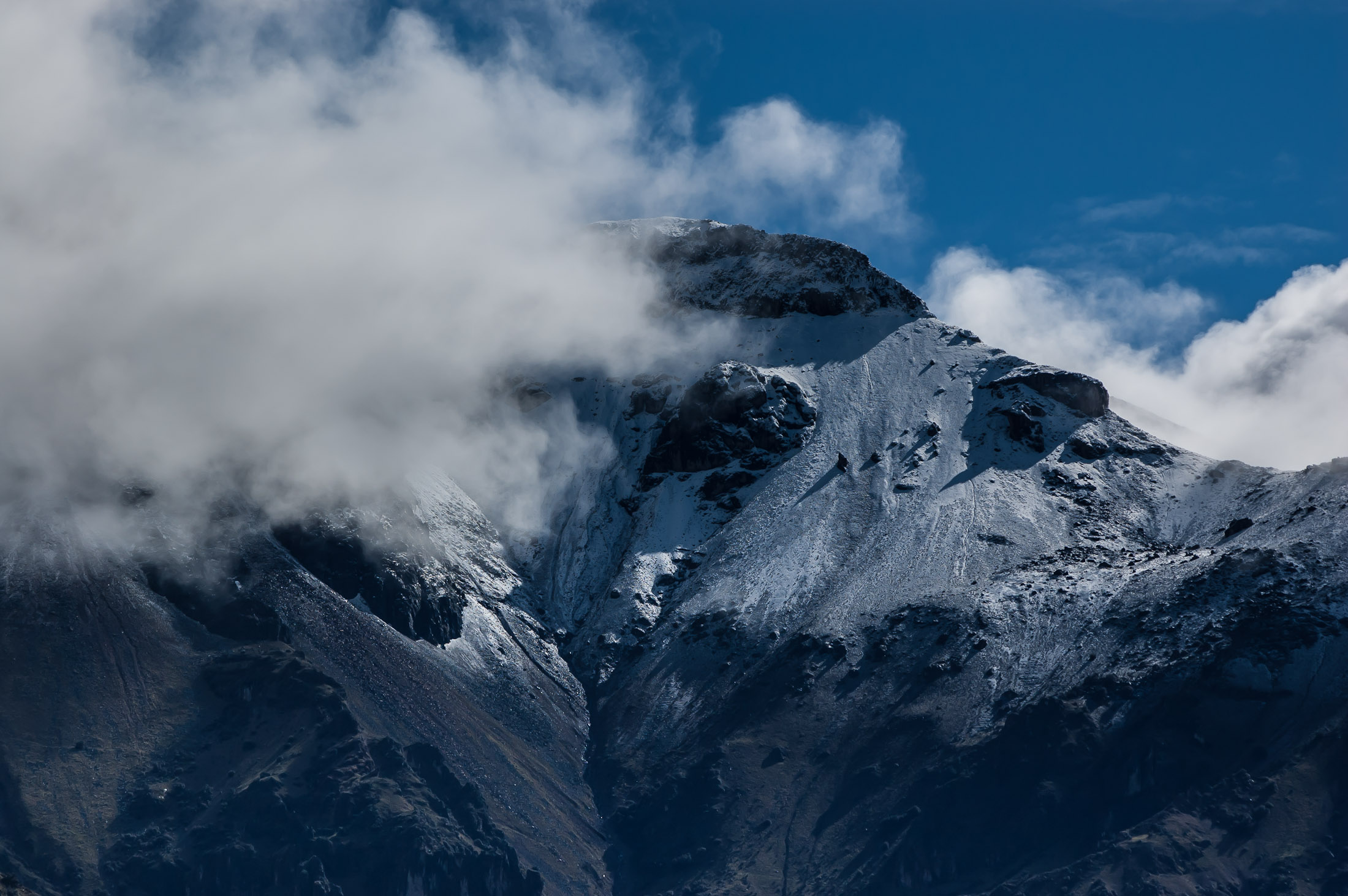
Colca Canyon in winter

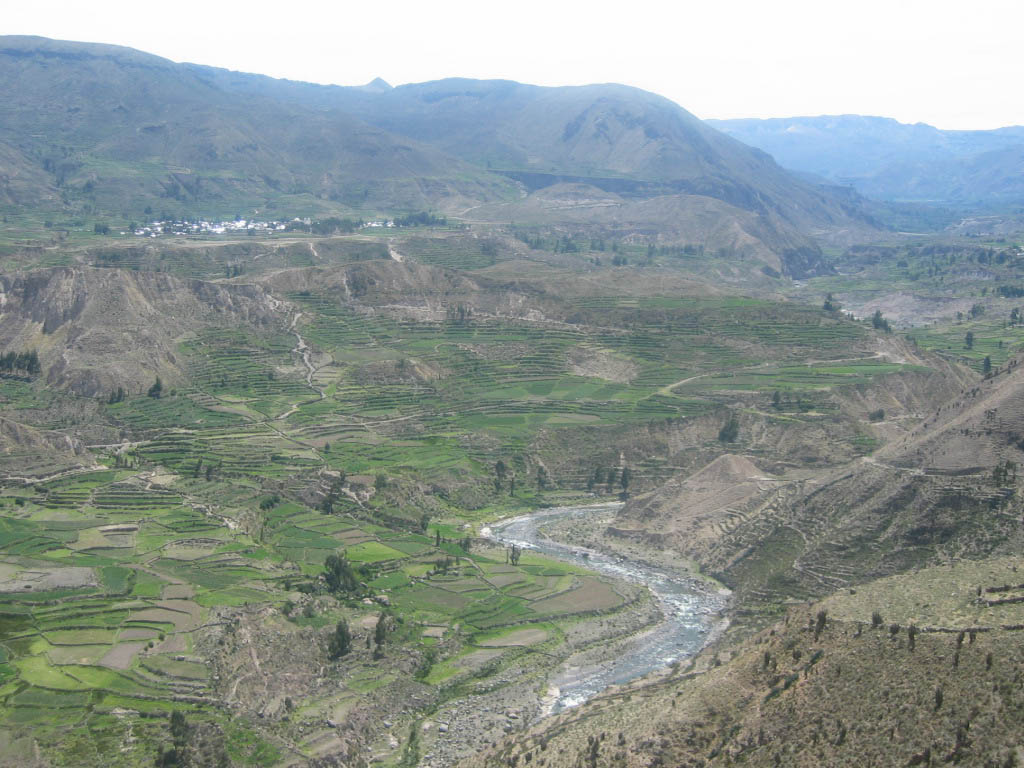
Colca Valley

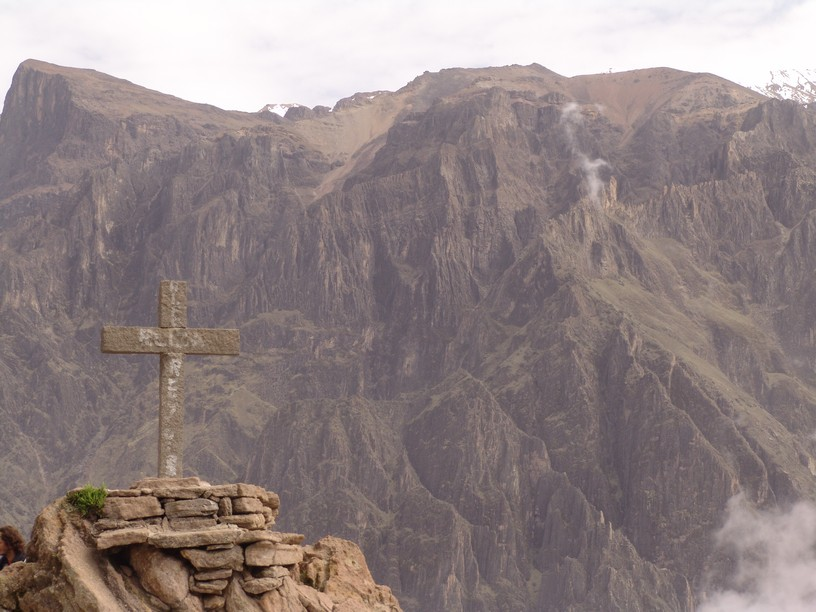
General view

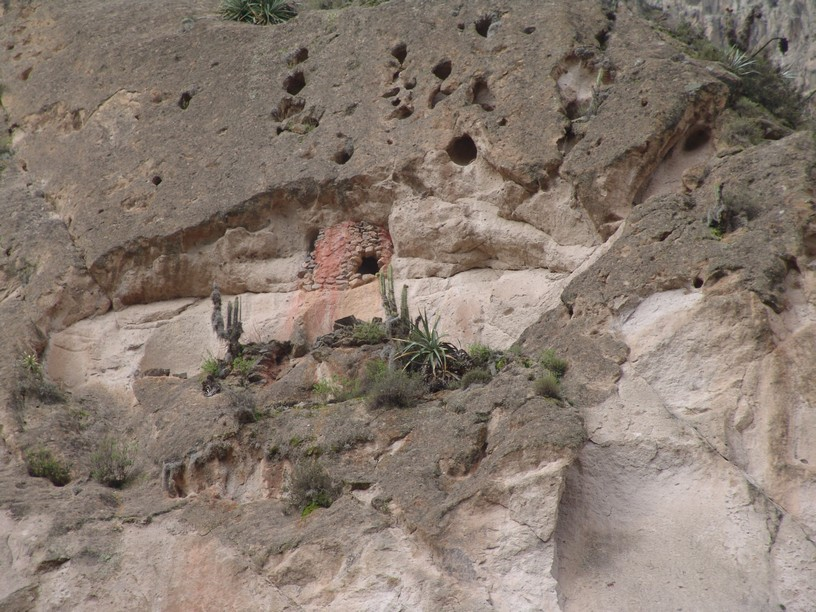
Inca tombs in the Colca Canyon

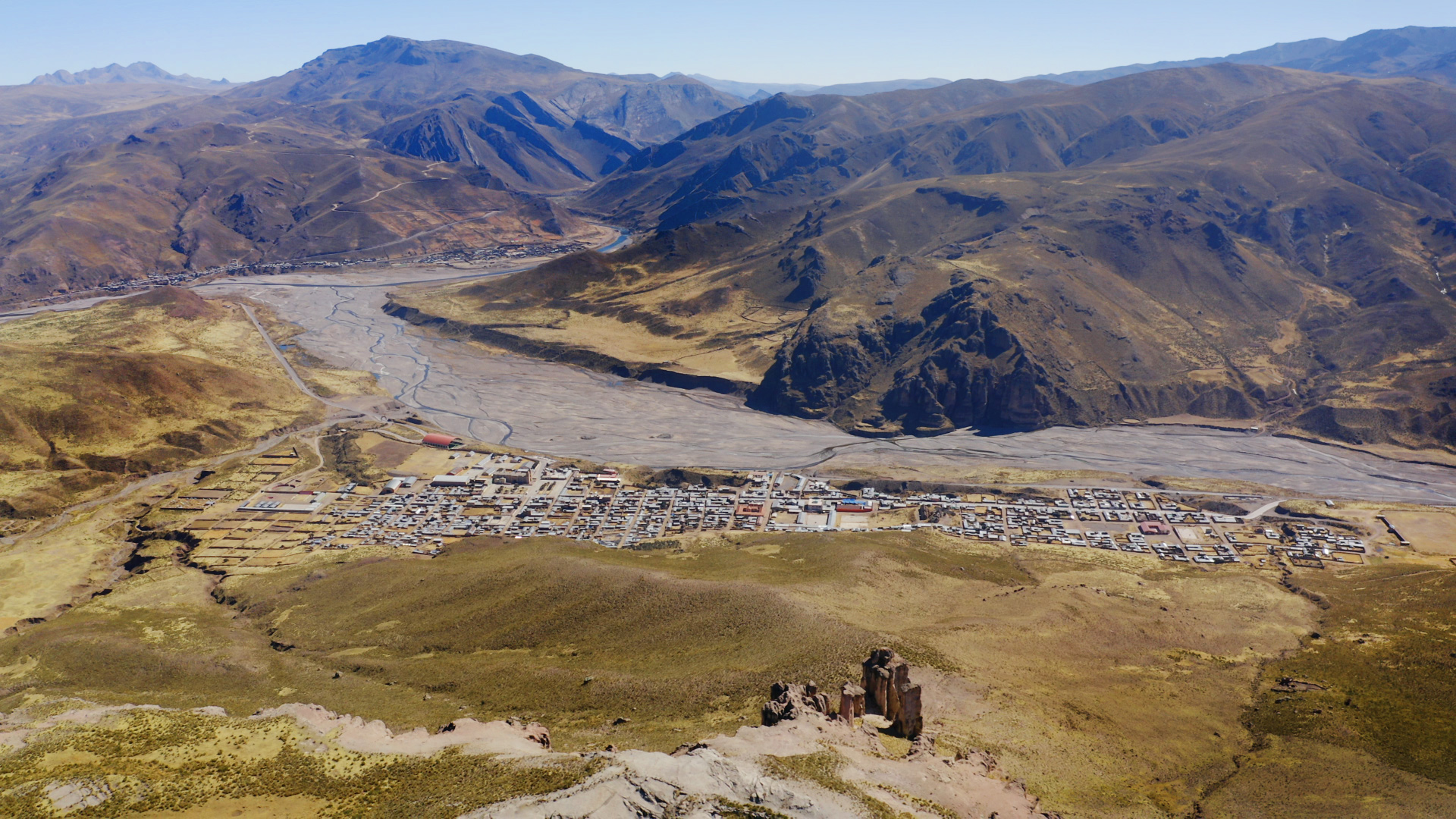
Callalli and the Callalli river as seen from the air

== See also ==
- Cotahuasi Canyon
