= Patapo District =

Coordinates: 6.7353°S 79.6345°W

Patapo Pátapo
- District
- Nickname: Spanish: "Tierra De Miel" English: "Land of the Honey"
- Interactive map of Patapo
- Country: Peru
- Region: Lambayeque
- Province: Chiclayo
- Founded: January 29, 1998
- Capital: Patapo

Government
  - Mayor: Juan Guevara Torres (2019-2022)

Area
  - Total: 182.81 km^{2} (70.58 sq mi)
- Elevation: 118 m (387 ft)

Population (2005 census)
  - Total: 20,874
  - Density: 114.18/km^{2} (295.74/sq mi)
- Time zone: UTC-5 (PET)
- UBIGEO: 140117

Patapo District is one of twenty districts of the province Chiclayo in Peru. It is west of the Chongoyape District, east of the Tuman District, north of the Pucala District, and south of the Mesones Muro District. Patapo District is the sixth largest district in the province of Chiclayo, only below Nueva Arica District, Saña District, Lagunas District, Oyotun District, and Chongoyape District. The district was founded on January 29, 1998. The district is home to the Cerro Patapo Ruins, a complex city on a mountainside with artifacts and numerous remnants of walls, staircases, and entrances, and was inhabited by the Wari peoples.

== Geography and Climate ==
=== Environment and Physical Features ===
Generally, the area is covered with somewhat steep slopes surrounded with flat patches of desert. Plains here tend to abruptly stop being flat and quickly turn into mountains. Despite these features, farmland is present in decent quantities with produce such as sugar cane. Patches of tropical plants are sparsely spread out and they usually are linked to one another.

=== Climate ===
On a typical day, the skies are clear and only partially cloudy, although it is not uncommon to have a sky void of clouds. Being
near the equator also results in blazing temperatures, especially during the summer. For similar reasons, the area tends to remain humid and the humidity level rarely dips below 50%. Officially the region is described to have a dry desert climate.

== Human Presence ==
=== Major Towns/Villages ===
The area mainly composes of small concentrations of houses throughout the connecting highway, but there are several locales with enough population to be considered a real town. Such places and their contents are briefly described below.

==== Patapo ====
The largest town in terms of population is Patapo (same name) and consists of the majority of the population in the district and is the most developed. Most paved roads and the few financial institutions are located here, for example. Major roads and thoroughfares includes Av. Trapiche, Av. Real, Av. San Martin, and La Florida, with the former being packed with vehicles throughout most of the day. At the intersection with Av. San Martin and Av. Trapiche, road congestion was such an issue that a traffic light was installed, however, it has seen been removed, possibly due to the lack of enforcement. Around the main park, clusters of inflated bouncy castles and slides and soccer stickman sets. There are several bakeries and restaurants, which are a common business throughout the country. Promotional murals painted on the exterior of houses and on billboards on top of buildings are common and help support a candidate.

===== Posope Alto =====
This town sits directly north of Patapo, and is considered to be part of the greater town. A dried up river separates the two towns geographically. There are unnamed bridges that can support vehicles, part of La Florida, Av. Trapiche, and the highway 6A from west to east. Additionally, a footbridge spans it in between the former two; the bridge is known locally to be unstable, it wobbles frequently and the structure collapsed at one point. The cemetery for both this town and the former is located here, and mass marches for the recently deceased is a common sight. Most roads are not paved and streets can get muddy as locals spill excess water to flatten out the streets. Similarly, a few restaurants and bakeries exist, but less than down south.

==== Conchucos ====
This is a small settlement which only comprises several blocks. The town is connected to a bridge which splits into two slightly different directions in order to ramp onto the highway. There is a soccer field on the outskirts of the town and the center is a medium-sized park. Most of the houses are packed one-story slums with the occasional two story building.

==== La Cria and El Progresso ====
Two towns which are known locally for the quality of their food. Small for the most part, and have little infrastructure besides power poles. La Cria has paved roads and is larger than El Progresso.

==== Others ====
Other populated centres within Patapo District include Las Canteras, Santa Lucía, Pósope Bajo, Tulipe, La Victoria, Desaguadero, La Aviación, Pampa La Victoria, La Planta, La Puntilla, Taymi, Concordia Alta and Cruz Tres de Mayo

=== Basic Infrastructure ===
Basic services provided to the population.

==== Plumbing ====
The majority of residents lack access to regular tap water. While the water is clean, due to the weakness of the pumps, water is only available at certain times of the day. Many residents take this time to stock up on water for the day. The households lucky enough to have regular water have installed a water tank, a massive tank usually installed on the roof of houses which fills up completely during the brief period water is available and stores it. This water tank connects with the home's plumbing system and allows for taps, toilets, and showers to have running water. Additionally, the sheer size of the tank ensures that the water won't run out before normal service is restored. Common tank brands are Rotoplas, Eternit, and Maestro. Most homes lack a boiler or another heating system, so the temperature of the water is usually cold unless it is sitting around on a tank (they heat up easily.) Bills are issued by the Municipality of Patapo.

==== Electricity ====
ENSA provides energy to the district and the towns. Service is decent although unexpected blackouts sometimes occur, although they aren't severe nor frequent as less developed areas. Sometimes electricity would be shut due to repairs or maintenance. Energy used to be provided by the government, and although the voltage was less, service was free. Due to lack of energy consumption and monetary value, the electrical bills rarely exceed US$2 (~6 PEN.)

== Archaeology ==
Cerro Patapo ruins site.

== See also ==
- Administrative divisions of Peru
- Chiclayo
