= Círculo Militar de Chorrillos shooting =

2025 mass shooting in Chorrillos, Peru

- Part of Peruvian security crisis
- Location: 12.161655°S 77.022727°W; Círculo Militar de Chorrillos, Chorrillos District, Lima, Peru
- Date: October 8, 2025
- Attack type: shooting
- Weapon: Pistol
- Deaths: 0
- Injuries: 6
- Victim: Members of Agua Marina
- Perpetrator: Under investigation
- Motive: extortion

A shooting occurred at a concert on the evening of 8 October 2025, in the Chorrillos district of Lima, the capital of Peru. The incident left six people injured, including four members of Agua Marina, a band performing during the shooting. Many media outlets attributed this event as one of the causes for the impeachment of President Dina Boluarte.

== Background ==
Towards the end of 2023, the security crisis in Peru began to impact Agua Marina directly. This included a series of extortion attacks, ranging from thefts of equipment to bomb threats at their concerts. In 2023, a shootout outside an Agua Marina concert in Chile left two security guards injured. Additionally, in 2024 there was a grenade attack in Villa María del Triunfo that caused Agua Marina and another band to cancel a show.

In March 2025, the band leader announced they had filed reports with the National Police of Peru, but nothing had come from these actions. That same month, the group Armonía 10 was affected by a shooting which left the's band singer Paul "El Ruso" Flores, dead of a gunshot wound. A leader of Agua Marina spoke openly about how this killing and the security crisis generally was affecting musicians. One of the criminal organizations that allegedly shook Agua Marina down for money was known as "Los Injertos del Cono Norte", and led by Erick Luis Moreno Hernández.

== Shooting ==
On the 8th of October, Agua Marina was playing a concert for the public holiday that commemorates the Battle of Angamos. At 11:30 PM, gunshots were heard from behind the stage where the band was playing. Four members of Agua Marina were shot, along with a bartender and an attendee. After the attack, the assailants fled on a motorcycle.

== Aftermath ==
Upon hearing the news of the attack, artists including Dina Páucar and Armonía 10 interrupted shows they were playing to announce news of the attack to their audiences. Other musicians such as Corazón Serrano, Grupo 5 and Hermanos Yaipén later publicly announced their concern about insecurity in Peru & its effects on the music industry. Other artists, including Gian Marco, Tony Succar, Jely Reátegui, Andrés Wiese, and Patricia Barreto also issued statements about the attack and in support of the band. The Ombudsman of Peru issued a statement lamenting the attack.

Multiple outlets, including Infobae and BBC Mundo, attributed this attack as "the final straw" that caused politicians to decide to impeach Dina Boluarte.

== See also ==
- Peruvian political crisis (2016–present)
