= 1974 FBC Melgar season =

FBC Melgar
1974 season
- Stadium: Estadio Mariano Melgar
- Torneo Descentralizado: First Stage: Twelfth (12°); Twelfth National (12°)
- Reclasificatorio Regional: Reclasificatorio 9: Second (2°); Triangular de Permanencia Second (2°)
Home colours	Away colours	Third colours

The 1974 FBC Melgar season was the Sixtieth (60.º) of the club since its foundation in 1915. Five (5) participations in the top-flight of Peruvian Primera División (of 58 Editions) with denomination Torneo Descentralizado. In Previous Season the club qualified as 6th Place of the 1973 Torneo Descentralizado.

Melgar were one of twenty-two (22) clubs in the Nineth edition (9.º) Torneo Descentralizado, the competition most important of the Peruvian football. The club played the Peruvian Primera División for Fifth (5th) Time.

== Torneo Descentralizado ==
=== First Stage ===
Pos	Team	Pld	W	D	L	GF	GA	GD	Pts
11	Alfonso Ugarte	42	13	16	13	72	60	+12	42
12	FBC Melgar	42	14	13	15	48	47	+1	41
13	Deportivo Municipal	42	15	10	17	56	65	-9	40

== See also ==
- FBC Melgar
- 1974 Torneo Descentralizado
- 1974 Reclasificatorio Regional
