= 1974 Reclasificatorio Regional =

Reclasificatorio Regional
- Season: 1974
- Promoted: Alfonso Ugarte; Atlético Barrio Frigorífico; Carlos A. Mannucci; Deportivo Junín; Piérola; Unión Pesquero; Unión Huaral; Walter Ormeño

The Reclasificatorio Regional, the second division of Peruvian football (soccer) in 1974, was divided into 13 Regions with the clubs of the First Division of the 1973 Torneo Descentralizado that had to Revalidate the category, with clubs that had been distrital, provincial and departmental champions in 1973 plus the runner-up of the Lima department. Thus forming a total of 42 clubs for 16 berths for the 1974 Primera División.

== Teams ==
The following list shows the teams that qualified for the Reclasificatorio Regional as Distrital, Provincial and Departamental champions.

Qualification method	Team	Location
1973 Torneo Descentralizado
1973 Torneo Descentralizado	Atlético Grau	Piura
1973 Torneo Descentralizado	Atlético Torino	Talara
1973 Torneo Descentralizado	Cienciano	Cusco
1973 Torneo Descentralizado	CNI	Iquitos
1973 Torneo Descentralizado	Juan Aurich	Chiclayo
1973 Torneo Descentralizado	León de Huánuco	Huánuco
1973 Torneo Descentralizado	Melgar	Arequipa
1973 Torneo Descentralizado	Sport Boys	Callao
1973 Torneo Descentralizado	Sportivo Huracán	Arequipa
1973 Torneo Descentralizado	Unión Tumán	Tumán
1973 Liga Departamental Amazonas	Deportivo Hospital	Chachapoyas
1973 Liga Departamental Áncash	Sider Perú	Chimbote
1973 Liga Departamental Apurímac	Unión Grauína	Abancay
1973 Liga Departamental Arequipa	Piérola	Arequipa
1973 Liga Departamental Ayacucho	Centenario	Ayacucho
1973 Liga Departamental Cajamarca	UTC	Cajamarca
1973 Liga Provincial del Callao	Atlético Barrio Frigorífico	Callao
1973 Liga Departamental Cusco	Salesiano	Cusco
1973 Liga Departamental Huancavelica	Estudiantes Unidos	Huancavelica
1973 Liga Departamental Huánuco	Juan Bielovucic	Huánuco
1973 Liga Departamental Ica	Octavio Espinosa	Ica

Qualification method	Team	Location
1973 Liga Departamental Junín	Deportivo Junín	Huancayo
1973 Liga Departamental La Libertad	Carlos A. Mannucci	Trujillo
1973 Liga Departamental Lambayeque	Cultural Pucalá	Pucalá
1973 Liga Departamental de Lima	Unión Huaral	Huaral
1973 Liga Departamental de Lima	Walter Ormeño	Cañete
1972 Hexagonal de Ascenso	CITSA	Barrios Altos
1973 Liga Provincial de Lima	Ciclista Lima	Cercado de Lima
1973 Liga Provincial de Lima	Mariscal Sucre	La Victoria
1973 Liga de los Balnearios del Sur	Santiago Barranco	Barranco
1973 Liga Distrital de Ate Vitarte	Sport Vitarte	Ate
1973 Liga Distrital de Puente Piedra	Deportivo Fabisa	Puente Píedra
1973 Liga Distrital de San Isidro	Deportivo Helvético	San Isidro
1973 Liga Departamental Loreto	Sport Loreto	Pucallpa
1973 Liga Departamental Madre de Dios	Colegio Nacional Billingurst	Puerto Maldonado
1973 Liga Departamental Moquegua	Unión Pesquero	Ilo
1973 Liga Departamental Pasco	Estudiantil Carrión	Cerro de Pasco
1973 Liga Departamental Piura	Sport Blondell	Talara
1973 Liga Departamental Puno	Alfonso Ugarte	Puno
1973 Liga Departamental San Martín	Sargento Tejada	Moyobamba
1973 Liga Departamental Tacna	Coronel Bolognesi	Tacna
1973 Liga Departamental Tumbes	Húsares de Junín	Tumbes

== Reclasificatorio Regional ==
=== Reclasificatorio 1 ===
==== Región Piura – Tumbes ====
Pos	Team	Pld	W	D	L	GF	GA	GD	Pts	Qualification	GRA	TOR	BLO	HUS
1	Atlético Grau	0	0	0	0	0	0	0	0	1974 Primera División		—	—	—
2	Atlético Torino	0	0	0	0	0	0	0	0	Triangular de Permanencia	—		—	—
3	Sport Blondell	0	0	0	0	0	0	0	0	Ligas Distritales	—	—		—
4	Húsares de Junín	0	0	0	0	0	0	0	0	Ligas Distritales	—	—	—	

Legend: Blue = home team win; Yellow = draw; Red = away team win.

=== Reclasificatorio 2 ===
==== Región Amazonas – Lambayeque ====
Pos	Team	Pld	W	D	L	GF	GA	GD	Pts	Qualification	TUM	AUR	PUC	HOS
1	Unión Tumán	0	0	0	0	0	0	0	0	1974 Primera División		—	—	—
2	Juan Aurich	0	0	0	0	0	0	0	0	Triangular de Permanencia	—		—	—
3	Cultural Pucalá	0	0	0	0	0	0	0	0	Ligas Distritales	—	—		—
4	Deportivo Hospital	0	0	0	0	0	0	0	0	Ligas Distritales	—	—	—	

Legend: Blue = home team win; Yellow = draw; Red = away team win.

=== Reclasificatorio 3 ===
==== Región Cajamarca – La Libertad ====
Pos	Team	Pld	W	D	L	GF	GA	GD	Pts	Qualification	CAM	UTC
1	Carlos A. Mannucci	2	1	1	0	3	1	+2	3	1974 Primera División		3–1
2	UTC	2	0	1	1	1	3	−2	1	Ligas Distritales	0–0	

Legend: Blue = home team win; Yellow = draw; Red = away team win.

=== Reclasificatorio 4 ===
==== Región Loreto – San Martín ====
Pos	Team	Pld	W	D	L	GF	GA	GD	Pts	Qualification	CNI	LOR	SAR
1	CNI	0	0	0	0	0	0	0	0	1974 Primera División		—	—
2	Sport Loreto	0	0	0	0	0	0	0	0	Ligas Distritales	—		—
3	Sargento Tejada	0	0	0	0	0	0	0	0	Ligas Distritales	—	—	

Legend: Blue = home team win; Yellow = draw; Red = away team win.

=== Reclasificatorio 5 ===
==== Región Huánuco – Pasco ====
Pos	Team	Pld	W	D	L	GF	GA	GD	Pts	Qualification	LEO	BIE	EST
1	León de Huánuco	0	0	0	0	0	0	0	0	1974 Primera División		—	—
2	Juan Bielovucic	0	0	0	0	0	0	0	0	Ligas Distritales	—		—
3	Estudiantil Carrión	0	0	0	0	0	0	0	0	Ligas Distritales	—	—	

Legend: Blue = home team win; Yellow = draw; Red = away team win.

=== Reclasificatorio 6 ===
==== Región Huancavelica – Junín ====
Pos	Team	Pld	W	D	L	GF	GA	GD	Pts	Qualification	JUN	EST
1	Deportivo Junín	2	2	0	0	6	1	+5	4	1974 Primera División		5–1
2	Estudiantes Unidos	2	0	0	2	1	6	−5	0	Ligas Distritales	0–1	

Legend: Blue = home team win; Yellow = draw; Red = away team win.

=== Reclasificatorio 7 ===
==== Región Áncash – Lima ====
Pos	Team	Pld	W	D	L	GF	GA	GD	Pts	Qualification	HUA	SID
1	Unión Huaral	2	0	2	0	1	1	0	2	1974 Primera División		1–1
2	Sider Perú	2	0	2	0	1	1	0	2	Ligas Distritales	0–0	

Legend: Blue = home team win; Yellow = draw; Red = away team win.

===== Tiebreaker =====
Team 1	Score	Team 2
Unión Huaral	2–0	Sider Perú

=== Reclasificatorio 8 ===
==== Región Ica ====
Pos	Team	Pld	W	D	L	GF	GA	GD	Pts	Qualification	ORM	OCT
1	Walter Ormeño	2	0	2	0	1	1	0	2	1974 Primera División		1–1
2	Octavio Espinosa	2	0	2	0	1	1	0	2	Ligas Distritales	0–0	

Legend: Blue = home team win; Yellow = draw; Red = away team win.

===== Tiebreaker =====
Team 1	Score	Team 2
Walter Ormeño	1–0	Octavio Espinosa

=== Reclasificatorio 9 ===
==== Región Arequipa – Apurímac ====
Pos	Team	Pld	W	D	L	GF	GA	GD	Pts	Qualification	PIE	MEL	UNI
1	Piérola	4	2	2	0	6	2	+4	6	1974 Primera División		3–1	2–0
2	Melgar	4	2	1	1	9	3	+6	5	Clasificación al Triangular de Permanencia	0–0		5–0
3	Unión Grauína	4	0	1	3	1	11	−10	1	Ligas Distritales	1–1	0–3	

Legend: Blue = home team win; Yellow = draw; Red = away team win.

===== Clasificación al Triangular de Permanencia =====
Team 1	Agg.	Team 2	1st leg	2nd leg
Melgar	2–1	Sportivo Huracán	0–1	2–0

===== Tiebreaker =====
Team 1	Score	Team 2
Melgar	2–0	Sportivo Huracán

=== Reclasificatorio 10 ===
==== Región Ayacucho – Cusco ====
Pos	Team	Pld	W	D	L	GF	GA	GD	Pts	Qualification	CIE	SAL	CEN
1	Cienciano	0	0	0	0	0	0	0	0	1974 Primera División		—	—
2	Salesiano	0	0	0	0	0	0	0	0	Ligas Distritales	—		—
3	Centenario	0	0	0	0	0	0	0	0	Ligas Distritales	—	—	

Legend: Blue = home team win; Yellow = draw; Red = away team win.

=== Reclasificatorio 11 ===
==== Región Moquegua – Tacna ====
Pos	Team	Pld	W	D	L	GF	GA	GD	Pts	Qualification	PES	BOL
1	Unión Pesquero	0	0	0	0	0	0	0	0	1974 Primera División		—
2	Coronel Bolognesi	0	0	0	0	0	0	0	0	Ligas Distritales	—	

Legend: Blue = home team win; Yellow = draw; Red = away team win.

=== Reclasificatorio 12 ===
==== Región Madre de Dios – Puno ====
Pos	Team	Pld	W	D	L	GF	GA	GD	Pts	Qualification	UGA	COL
1	Alfonso Ugarte	1	1	0	0	3	0	+3	2	1974 Primera División		3–0
2	Colegio Nacional Billingurst	1	0	0	1	0	3	−3	0	Ligas Distritales	—	

Legend: Blue = home team win; Yellow = draw; Red = away team win.

=== Reclasificatorio 13 ===
==== Región Metropolitana ====
Pos	Team	Pld	W	D	L	GF	GA	GD	Pts	Qualification	BAR	HEL	CIC	CIT	SAN	SUC	FAB	VIT
1	Atlético Barrio Frigorífico	7	4	3	0	11	3	+8	11	1974 Primera División		3–0	1–1	0–0		4–1		
2	Deportivo Helvético	7	5	1	1	10	3	+7	11	Revalidación Metropolitana			0–0	1–0	3–0		2–0	
3	Ciclista Lima	7	2	5	0	6	6	0	9	Ligas Distritales					0–0		2–0	2–1
4	CITSA	7	2	4	1	6	3	+3	8	Ligas Distritales			1–1			1–1	3–0	1–0
5	Santiago Barranco	7	2	3	2	9	7	+2	7	Ligas Distritales	1–2			0–0			4–2	5–0
6	Mariscal Sucre	7	2	3	2	11	9	+2	7	Ligas Distritales		0–2	1–1		0–0			
7	Deportivo FABISA	7	1	0	6	5	15	−10	2	Ligas Distritales	0–1					0–2		3–1
8	Sport Vitarte	7	0	1	6	3	15	−12	1	Ligas Distritales	0–0	0–2				1–6		

Legend: Blue = home team win; Yellow = draw; Red = away team win.

==== Title playoff ====
Team 1	Score	Team 2
Atlético Barrio Frigorífico	2–0	Deportivo Helvético

Atlético Barrio Frigorífico earned promotion to the 1974 Primera División.

==== Revalidación Metropolitana ====
Team 1	Agg.	Team 2	1st leg	2nd leg
Sport Boys	6–3	Deportivo Helvético	3–1	3–2

Sport Boys remain in the Primera División.

=== Triangular de Permanencia ===
Pos	Team	Pld	W	D	L	GF	GA	GD	Pts	Qualification	AUR	MEL	TOR
1	Juan Aurich	1	1	0	0	4	0	+4	2	1974 Primera División			4–0
2	Melgar	1	1	0	0	3	2	+1	2	1974 Primera División	n.p.		
3	Atlético Torino	2	0	0	2	2	7	−5	0	Ligas Distritales		2–3	

Legend: Blue = home team win; Yellow = draw; Red = away team win.

== See also ==
- 1973 Torneo Descentralizado
- 1974 Torneo Descentralizado
