= Grupo 5 =

- Also known as: El Grupo de Oro del Perú
- Origin: Monsefú, Chiclayo province, Peru
- Genre: Peruvian cumbia
- Years active: 1973–present
- Website: https://grupo5.pe/

Grupo 5 is a Peruvian cumbia group formed on 31 January 1973 in Monsefú, Chiclayo province, by brothers Elmer and Víctor Yaipén Uypán. Initially a group performing romantic ballads, it increasingly adopted cumbia during the 1980s and has become one of the prominent acts associated with the northern Peruvian form of the genre.

Following Elmer Yaipén Uypán's death in 1999, leadership of the group passed primarily to his sons Elmer, Andy and Christian Yaipén. The group experienced a major resurgence during the 2000s with songs including "Morir de amor", "Motor y motivo", "Te vas", "Adiós amor" and "Quién cura". In 2020, Billboard included Grupo 5 in its list of "15 Peruvian Artists to Have on Your Radar", describing it as one of Peru's most popular cumbia groups.

== History ==
=== Formation and early years ===
Grupo 5 was founded by brothers Elmer and Víctor Yaipén Uypán in Monsefú on 31 January 1973. The brothers, who helped their mother at a market in the Lambayeque Region, were interested in music and regularly encountered Mexican songbooks and magazines. According to accounts of the band's history, groups identified by numbers such as Grupo 1 and Grupo 3 appeared in these publications, inspiring the brothers to select the otherwise absent number five for their own group.

Grupo 5's original lineup consisted of five musicians and initially concentrated on romantic ballads. Its first recordings for the Peruvian label Infopesa included No pongas ese disco (1980) and Recuérdame (1981).

The group's third album, El show internacional del... Grupo 5 (1983), represented a transition toward cumbia while retaining elements of ballad and disco. Cumbia subsequently became the main basis of the group's sound. The period produced songs including "Pagarás", "Tormenta", "Sueño contigo" and "Amigo".

In 1995, Elmer Yaipén Quesquén and Andy Yaipén, sons of Elmer Yaipén Uypán, joined the group while still young.

=== Death of Elmer Yaipén and resurgence ===
On 9 November 1999, founder Elmer Yaipén Uypán died in a road accident while travelling from Chiclayo toward Monsefú. El Comercio later reported that approximately 28,000 people attended his farewell at the Estadio Elías Aguirre. His sons Elmer and Andy subsequently took responsibility for reorganizing and continuing the group.

A significant stage in Grupo 5's revival began in January 2004, when the group met composer Estanis Mogollón after a performance near Catacaos. Mogollón had written "Morir de amor" for the group; after the musicians rearranged and began performing it, the song became their first major hit in several years. Their collaboration subsequently produced songs including "Te vas", "Motor y motivo", "Adiós amor", "Quién cura", "Que levante la mano" and "Pa' fuera".

"Motor y motivo" became the title track of the group's 2005 album and one of its best-known recordings. The renewed popularity of these recordings helped the group expand beyond its traditional audience in northern Peru and undertake tours elsewhere in Latin America, the United States and Europe.

In 2008, Grupo 5 undertook its first tour of Japan, with performances planned in Gunma, Kanagawa and Nagoya. The same year the group also performed in the United States, including at a Peruvian festival in New Jersey.

The albums La amante (2007), Puro corazón (2009) and El ritmo de mi corazón (2012) followed during this period. The title song of El ritmo de mi corazón was written by Peruvian singer-songwriter Gian Marco.

=== Christian Yaipén and later popularity ===
Christian Yaipén, the youngest son of Elmer Yaipén Uypán, studied contemporary writing and production at Berklee College of Music and graduated in 2015. He became a full-time member of Grupo 5 around this period and subsequently emerged as its principal vocalist, while his brothers Elmer and Andy remained involved in musical direction and production.

During the COVID-19 pandemic in Peru, restrictions on live entertainment forced the group to suspend its normal concert activity. Grupo 5 instead organized online performances, including its annual Elmer Vive tribute. Its streaming concert was named best streaming concert at El Comercio's 2020 Premios Luces. The group also released Llorar Llorar in 2020.

In 2022, Grupo 5 staged its Noche de Oro concert series at the Parque de la Exposición in Lima. The production later won the 2022 Premio Luces for Peruvian concert of the year. The group also received the award for hit of the year for "Me vas a extrañar", a collaboration with Ezio Oliva and Rombai.

For its 50th anniversary in 2023, Grupo 5 performed three consecutive concerts at San Marcos Stadium in Lima on 31 March, 1 April and 2 April. The three shows filled the stadium and featured guest performers from Peru and other Latin American countries.

The following year, Grupo 5 marked its 51st anniversary with three concerts on 5–7 April 2024 at the National Stadium of Peru. RPP reported that the three concerts drew a combined audience of more than 150,000 people. Recordings from the anniversary concerts were later issued as the live albums 50 Aniversario desde el Estadio San Marcos (2024) and 3 Noches en el Estadio Nacional (2025).

In April 2026, Grupo 5 became a member of The Latin Recording Academy, the organization responsible for the annual Latin Grammy Awards. In July that year, the group and Colombian ensemble La Sonora Dinamita released the collaborative album Versus Internacional de la Cumbia.

== Musical style and legacy ==
Grupo 5 is principally associated with northern Peruvian cumbia. Other influences include Colombian and Caribbean music as well as brass arrangements influenced by salsa. The band's use of electronic instruments and their lyrical themes centered on love and disappointment are also central to their style.

The band's early recordings were considerably more stylistically varied. Before cumbia became its predominant style, Grupo 5 performed romantic ballads, while later recordings also incorporated elements of disco, pop, rock, salsa, merengue and other Latin popular genres.

The group is known in Peru by the nickname El Grupo de Oro del Perú ("The Golden Group of Peru"). Its multi-generational career and role in the development and popularization of northern Peruvian cumbia have been discussed alongside Agua Marina and Armonía 10.

== In other media ==
Grupo 5's rise in popularity inspired the 2009 musical comedy film Motor y motivo, written and directed by Enrique Chimoy. Members of the group appeared in the film alongside Peruvian actors and entertainers.

In January 2010, América Televisión premiered Puro Corazón, a biographical miniseries dramatizing the history of Grupo 5 and the Yaipén family. Its premiere received a reported television rating of 25 points.

== Discography ==
Published retrospectives and digital music catalogues differ somewhat in how Grupo 5's releases are classified, particularly compilations, re-recordings and concert releases. The following list separates the main studio chronology from later live albums where their classification can be verified.

=== Studio albums ===
- No pongas ese disco (1980)
- Recuérdame (1981)
- El show internacional del... Grupo 5 (1983)
- Sueño contigo (1984)
- Corazón herido (1992)
- Amarte hasta la muerte (1994)
- Viva el amor (1995)
- Quiero olvidarte (1999)
- Así se goza con... Grupo 5 (2000)
- El Fiestón del Grupo 5 (2002)
- Motor y motivo (2005)
- La amante (2007)
- Puro corazón (2009)
- El ritmo de mi corazón (2012)
- Llorar Llorar (2020)

=== Other albums ===
- El ritmo de mi corazón (2020 version)
- Amigo y Algo Más (2022)
- Versus Internacional de la Cumbia (with La Sonora Dinamita) (2026)

=== Live albums ===
- Elmer Vive! (2017)
- Teatro Gran Rex (2018)
- Live in Madrid (2019)
- Elmer Vive 2020 (2020)
- Fiestón de Año Nuevo (2022)
- Noche de Oro (2023)
- Noche de Oro, Vol. 2 (2023)
- 50 Aniversario desde el Estadio San Marcos (2024)
- 3 Noches en el Estadio Nacional (2025)
