= Impeachment of Dina Boluarte =

2025 removal of the president of Peru

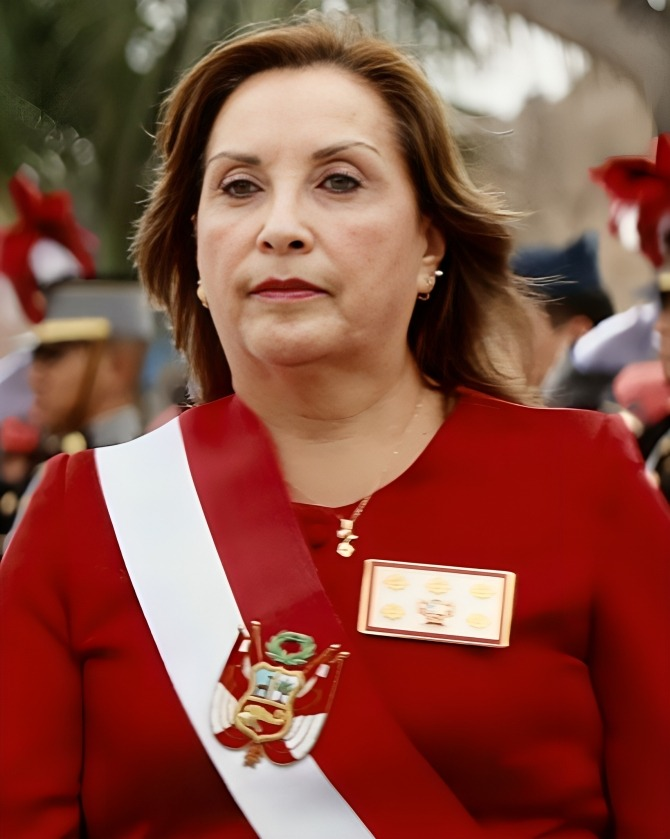
- Boluarte in 2024
- Accused: Dina Boluarte, president of Peru
- Proponents: Congress of Peru
- Date: 9 October 2025 to 10 October 2025
- Outcome: Impeachment successful: Boluarte removed from office; José Jerí assumes the presidency
- Charges: Adopted: "Moral incapacity" under Article 113 § 2 of the Constitution of Peru

On 10 October 2025, the Congress of the Republic of Peru voted unanimously to remove Dina Boluarte as President of Peru for "permanent moral incapacity" under Article 113 of the Constitution of Peru. The impeachment was declared after the vote surpassed the required threshold of 87 votes in favor. Boluarte thus became the fifth president removed via this mechanism, following Guillermo Billinghurst (1914), Alberto Fujimori (2000), Martín Vizcarra (2020), and Pedro Castillo (2022).

Boluarte's presidency was marked by historic unpopularity; she was frequently described as the "world's least popular leader," with an approval rating as low as 2% in early 2025 amid allegations of corruption, mismanagement, and repeated impeachment attempts. While previous efforts to oust her—spearheaded by left-wing parties—had failed, a broad coalition eventually formed. Right-wing parties joined the calls for her removal following a surge in violent crime, including the Círculo Militar de Chorrillos shooting. Boluarte declined to appear before Congress, with her lawyer citing alleged violations of due process. Shortly after midnight, Congress declared the presidency vacant, and José Jerí, the incumbent president of Congress, was sworn in as her successor.

== Background ==
Throughout her tenure, Boluarte was chronically unpopular, reaching a historic low of 2% approval as of March 2025. Consequently, she was labeled "the world's least popular leader" or the "most unpopular leader in the world". She faced multiple impeachment motions stemming from various scandals and allegations of corruption, criticism of her handling of security crises, and general disapproval of her governance. None of the initial motions succeeded, as they were primarily supported only by left and far-left parties. However, right-wing parties—including Popular Renewal, We Are Peru, Alliance for Progress, and even Popular Force—eventually lent their support to the final impeachment process.

== Impeachment ==
On 9 October 2025, several congressional blocs submitted multiple motions of impeachment against President Boluarte. At the time of filing, it was unclear whether the motions had the necessary support to be admitted for debate. The central arguments for impeachment were the ongoing security crisis—exacerbated by the Círculo Militar de Chorrillos shooting the previous day—and the government's eroding authority. At 5:00 p.m., a second motion (Agenda 19770) was introduced by Congresswoman Norma Yarrow and other legislators, citing the escalating security crisis, a lack of executive leadership, and an alleged inability to govern.

At least four motions were registered that day, all citing "permanent moral incapacity" as the grounds. The congressmen promoting impeachment argued that the security crisis had reached critical levels under Boluarte, that her policies were insufficient, and that governability was severely compromised. Concurrently, the Council of Ministers, led by Eduardo Arana Ysa, and the Minister of the Interior, Carlos Malaver, presented anti-crime measures to Congress. However, many parliamentarians deemed these responses unsatisfactory and untimely.

As rumors of a potential escape circulated, some legislators submitted documents to several embassies to preemptively deny Boluarte asylum upon her removal. Her lawyer, Juan Carlos Portugal, however, publicly ruled out any such intention. Meanwhile, demonstrators gathered outside the Ecuadorian embassy and the president's residence in Surquillo.

A brief debate on the impeachment motions was held at 9:00 p.m., followed by five votes to admit them. All five passed with a congressional majority, with Congressman Alfredo Azurín of We Are Peru as the sole dissenting vote on each occasion. A request to hold the final impeachment vote at 11:30 p.m. was then approved with 113 votes in favour. Boluarte did not appear in Congress at the scheduled time. Her lawyer issued a statement declaring that Boluarte would not attend, arguing that the limited time given to prepare violated her right to defense and that they would not legitimize the proceeding.

The impeachment process began at 11:50 p.m. The final vote commenced at 00:01 on 10 October 2025, and at 00:07, Boluarte's removal was announced with 122 votes in favour, 0 against, and 0 abstentions.

Following the removal, a motion of censure against the Board of Directors presided over by José Jerí was introduced for debate. While this motion was being voted on, Boluarte issued a recorded statement defending her administration. After the motion of censure was rejected, Jerí was sworn in as the new president.

== Voting results ==
The final vote on the presidential impeachment was held on 10 October 2025. The constitution grants the president the right to a defense, and the session was scheduled for this purpose; however, as noted, President Boluarte chose not to attend.

The motion to remove Boluarte for "permanent moral incapacity" was approved unanimously by the legislators present, with 121 votes in favor, 0 against, and 0 abstentions, resulting in the vacancy of the presidency.

President	Date	Vote	FP	APP	PP	JP	PL	RP	SP	AP	AvP	HD	Bancada Socialista	BDP	Ind.	Total
Dina Boluarte Ind.	10 October 2025 Motion approved Office vacated	✓ Yes	21	16	13	10	9	11	8	9	6	3	5	5	5	121 / 130
Dina Boluarte Ind.	10 October 2025 Motion approved Office vacated	✗ No														0 / 130
Dina Boluarte Ind.	10 October 2025 Motion approved Office vacated	Abstain														0 / 130
