= La Otra Banda =

Archaeological site in Lambayeque, Peru

- Los Paredones de La Otra Banda - Las Ánimas
- Lambayeque department of Peru

- Location within Peru
- Interactive map of La Otra Banda
- Type: temple and burial ground
- Periods: Archaic
- Location: Zaña Valley, northwest Peru
- Region: Lambayeque

History
- Built: 2000–3000 BCE

Site notes
- Excavation dates: 2024
- Archaeologists: Luis Muro Ynoñán

La Otra Banda is an archaeological site in northern coastal Peru where a 4,000-year-old temple and theater were discovered in June 2024 by a team of archaeologists from the Field Museum in Chicago. The site is located near the hamlet of La Otra Banda, south of the town of Zaña in the Zaña district of northwestern Peru's Lambayeque region. Excavations were led by Field Museum scientist Luis Muro Ynoñán.

The temple walls were decorated with intricate images of figures with human bodies, bird heads, and reptilian claws. Skeletal remains of three adults were found.

According to Muro Ynoñán, "This discovery tells us about the early origins of religion in Peru. We still know very little about how and under which circumstances complex belief systems emerged in the Andes, and now we have evidence about some of the earliest religious spaces that people were creating in this part of the world."

The Temple at La Otra Banda predates the Inca site at Machu Picchu by roughly 3,500 years, and was built long before the Incas or earlier peoples such as the Moche and Nazca cultures. As of July 2024 radio-carbon dating is pending to establish a more exact age of the construction.

== See also ==
- Ancient Peru
- Andean civilizations
- Andean preceramic
- Caral–Supe civilization
- Pre-Columbian Peru
- Prehistoric religion
- Úcupe

== Works cited ==
- "Ancient Temple and Theater Discovered in Peru" (press release). Chicago: Field Museum. 10 July 2024.
- Radley, Dario (9 July 2024). "5,000-year-old ceremonial temple discovered in northwestern Peru". Archaeology News.
- Cunningham, Mary (11 July 2024). "Archaeologists unearth 4,000-year-old temple and theater in Peru". CBS News.
