= Agua Marina =

Peruvian cumbia band

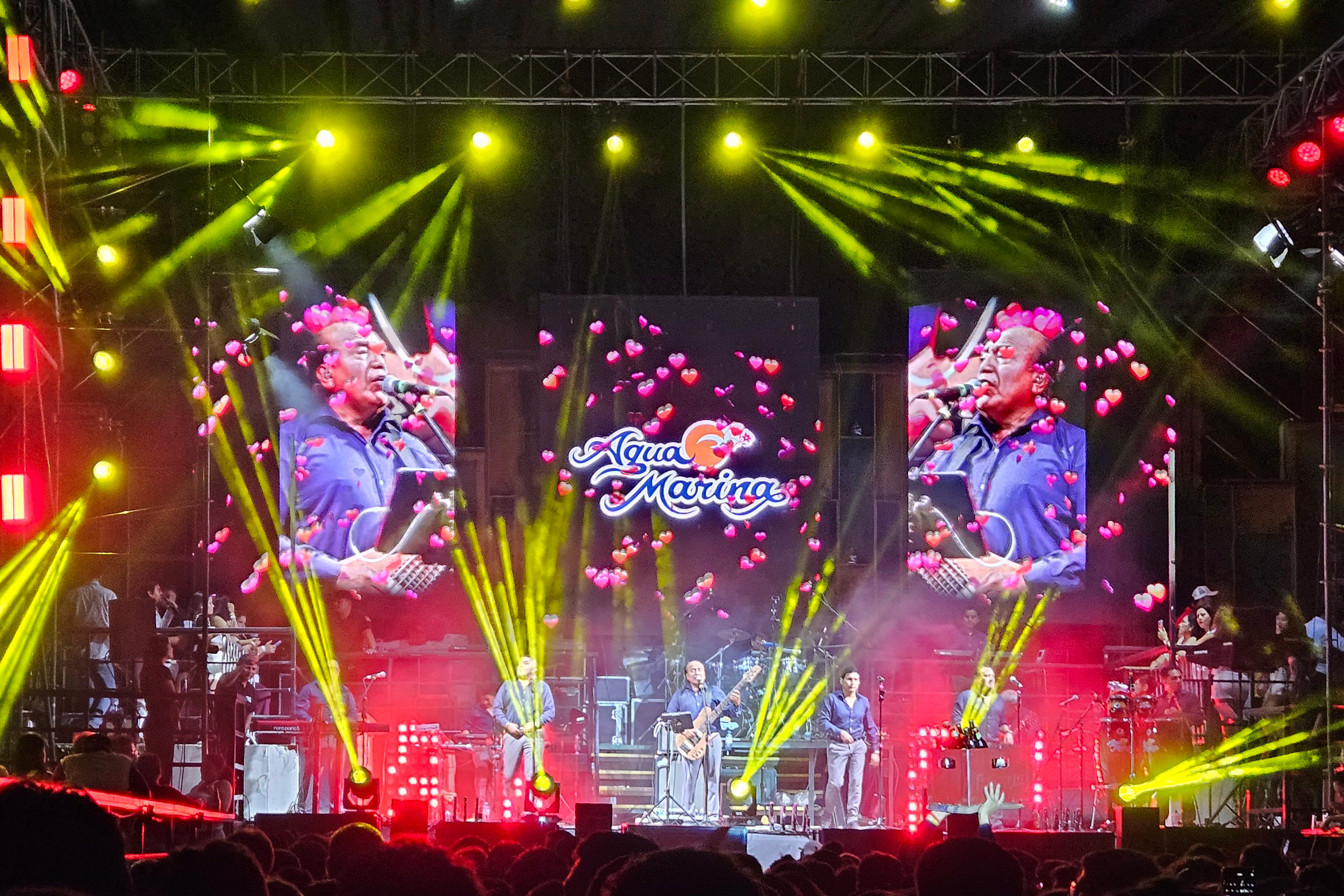
- Agua Marina performing in Piura in December 2024

Background information
- Origin: Sechura, Department of Piura, Peru
- Genres: Peruvian cumbia
- Years active: 1976–present
- Label: Infopesa
- Website: https://www.aguamarina.pe

Agua Marina is a Peruvian cumbia band formed in Sechura, Department of Piura, in 1976 by the brothers José and Manuel Quiroga Querevalú. The group has become one of the prominent representatives of northern Peruvian cumbia, alongside acts such as Grupo 5 and Armonía 10. Its national breakthrough came in the late 1990s with "Tu amor fue una mentira", which became one of the most widely played cumbia songs on Peruvian radio.

== History ==
=== Formation and early years ===
José and Manuel Quiroga Querevalú developed an interest in music while young. Their family had lived in Chimbote, but returned to Sechura after their home was damaged in the 1970 Ancash earthquake. Manuel subsequently played in a school rock group called Sangre Joven, and the brothers later joined the local group Mario y sus Estrellas.

In the mid-1970s, several musicians from Mario y sus Estrellas were recruited into military and police bands during the period of the Revolutionary Government of the Armed Forces of Peru, leaving the brothers without a group. They consequently decided to establish their own ensemble. Their parents supported the project financially, including by selling a fishing boat to purchase instruments and sound equipment.

The band's name was selected at a family meeting in 1976. After considering several alternatives, including Sabana and Frutos del desierto, a cousin proposed Agua Marina. José Quiroga later explained that the name evoked both the aquamarine gemstone and the changing nature of the sea, which the family compared to the group's varied musical repertoire.

Agua Marina made its first public appearance on 30 August 1976 at an event associated with the Civil Guard in Sechura. The original lineup consisted of José Quiroga on vocals and bass, Manuel Quiroga on lead guitar, Eduardo Zapata on second guitar and backing vocals, singers Alberto Paiva and Moisés Bustamante, timbal player Tomás Chapa and guitarist Hugo Querevalú. Their younger brothers Teófilo and Luis Quiroga later joined on keyboards and percussion, respectively.

The group initially performed a mixture of tropical music, rock, ballads and salsa before increasingly concentrating on the northern Peruvian style of cumbia. In 1986 it began recording for the Peruvian record label Infopesa, which released early recordings including "Baila, baila suavecito" and "Sirena del amor".

=== National success ===
Although Agua Marina had established a following in northern Peru, it did not achieve comparable exposure in Lima until the late 1990s. "Tu amor fue una mentira", recorded with singer Lucho Paz, became a major radio success around 1998–1999 and helped expand the audience for northern cumbia on Lima FM radio. RPP later described the 1990s, particularly the end of the decade, as the band's period of greatest popular success.

During the following years the group performed throughout Peru and abroad. The band's repertoire expanded to include songs such as "Paloma ajena", "Así es el amor", "Amor prohibido", "Pasitos para bailar" and "Tu traición se acabó".

In 2008 Agua Marina released Directo al corazón, a recording project that included interpretations of songs associated with Spanish singer-songwriter Alejandro Sanz.

=== 2020s ===
On 14 August 2020, Agua Marina singer Tomás Espejo died at the age of 46 from complications due to COVID-19. The group subsequently paid tribute to him through its social-media accounts.

In April 2021, Agua Marina collaborated with singer Mauricio Mesones on the song "Cuando callas", which was released as part of Mesones's album Viaje tropical.

In June 2023, Agua Marina appeared with Grupo 5 on a live recording of the song "El teléfono".

Teófilo Quiroga Rumiche, the father of the Quiroga brothers and an important figure in the establishment and development of Agua Marina, died in Sechura on 19 July 2025 at the age of 92. The band suspended its performances until mid-August while the family was in mourning.

=== 2025 shooting and hiatus ===
On 8 October 2025, four members of Agua Marina were wounded when gunmen opened fire during a concert at the Círculo Militar in Chorrillos District, Lima. The incident, subsequently known as the Círculo Militar de Chorrillos shooting, also injured members of the public.

Later that month, the band announced an indefinite pause from live performances while its members recovered and security concerns were addressed. The group made a limited return on 31 December with a virtual New Year's performance broadcast on YouTube.

In July 2026, Agua Marina announced that its first major in-person concert following the hiatus would be Gracias por todo, scheduled for 28 November 2026 at San Marcos Stadium in Lima as part of the band's 50th-anniversary celebrations. The announcement described the concert as the end of the extended pause that had followed the October 2025 attack.

== Discography ==
Agua Marina's early recordings for Infopesa were later collected on the four-disc, 57-track compilation Inicios: Primeros Volúmenes in 2016. The band's main discography consists of a numbered series of releases, alongside anniversary albums, compilations and live recordings. The band's official website identifies Vol. 23 as a discographic milestone following Volumes 20–22, although digital distributors classify the three-track release as a single rather than a full-length album.

=== Numbered albums ===
- Vol. 1 – Baila suavecito (1986)
- Vol. 2 – Sirena del amor (1987)
- Vol. 3 – Soy pescador (1988)
- Vol. 4 – Juguete de amor (1989)
- Vol. 5 – Muchacha (1990)
- Vol. 6 – Por que te quiero (1991)
- Vol. 7 – Siete noches (1992)
- Vol. 8 – Amanecer (1994)
- Vol. 9 – Quiero olvidarte (1995)
- Vol. 10 – Amor amor (1996)
- Vol. 11 – Tu amor fue una mentira (1997)
- Vol. 12 – La Nueva Era (2000)
- Vol. 13 – Así es el amor (2001)
- Vol. 14 – Original (2002)
- Vol. 15 – Evolución (2003)
- Vol. 16 – Vivencias (2005)
- Vol. 17 – Sin límites (2006)
- Vol. 18 – Directo al corazón (2008)
- Vol. 19 – 33... años en el camino (2009)
- Vol. 20 – Número 20 (2011)
- Vol. 21 – Baila conmigo (2013)
- Vol. 22 – Agua Marina (2017)

=== Other albums ===
- 41 Años (2018)
- Sesiones Kavipor (2021)

=== Compilations ===
- 25 Años (2001)
- Colección de Oro (2010)
- Inicios: Primeros Volúmenes (2016)

=== Live albums ===
- 42 años (Concierto En Vivo) (2018)
- Domingos de fiesta (En Vivo) (2019)

=== Selected singles and EPs ===
- Sinfónico (2019)
- "Mala hierba" (2019)
- "Locura de amor" (2020)
- "Cuando callas" (with Mauricio Mesones) (2021)
- "Falso amor" (with Antologia) (2021)
- "Veinte Primaveras" (2023)
- "Si Tu Dices Quererme (Remix)" (with Jhon & Demian and Alexander Blas) (2023)
- Agua Marina, Vol. 23 (2024)
- CARNAVAL (EP) (2026)
