= Monsefú =

City in Peru

Monsefú Mochica: Omænssefæc San Pedro de Monsefú
- City
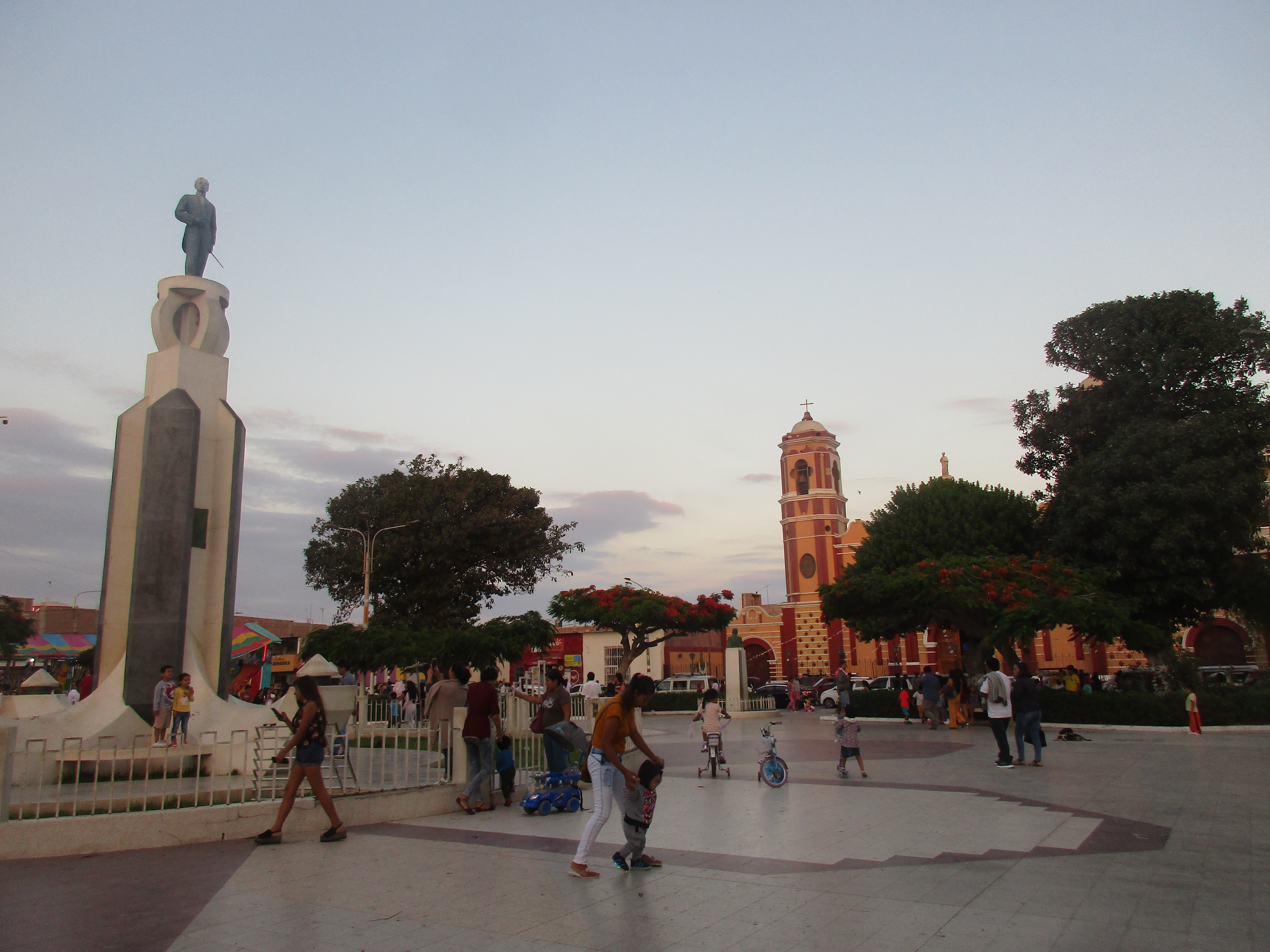
- Plaza de Armas of Monsefú

- Coat of arms
- Nickname: The Eternal City of Flowers
- Motto(s): Entrepreneurial and Laborious
- Location within Peru
- Coordinates: 6°52′40.21″S 79°52′18.72″W
- Country: Peru
- Department: Lambayeque
- Province: Chiclayo
- District: Monsefú
- Elevated to city: October 26, 1888

Government
  - Mayor: Erwin Huertas Uceda (2022-2026)

Area
  - Total: 44.94 km^{2} (17.35 sq mi)
- Elevation: 11 m (36 ft)

Population
  - Estimate (2015): 23,561
- Time zone: UTC-5 (PET)
- Website: www.munimonsefu.gob.pe

Monsefú (Colonial Mochica: Omænssefæc), founded as San Pedro de Monsefú, is a city in northern Peru, located in the Department of Lambayeque. It is the capital of the district of the same name in Chiclayo province.

Monsefú was elevated to the category of "city" on October 26, 1888, in the aftermath of the War of the Pacific—during which it was occupied—following a request of its deputy Manuel María Izaga. It is known today for its gastronomy and culture, being the birthplace of a number of cumbia musical groups.

== Etymology ==
Spanish priest Fernando de la Carrera, in his work Arte de la lengua yunga (1644), argues that the word "monsefu" comes from Omænssefæc, meaning "God punishes the one who offends the earth".

== History ==
Before the arrival of the Spanish, Monsefú would have been part of the chieftainship of Cinto, with the name of Chuspo, whose main center have been located in the vicinity of San Bartolo hill.

The town was founded by the Spanish under the name "San Pedro de Monsefú". In 1578, heavy rains and floods blighted the crops and in 1612, the area was ravaged by a disease. The population was reduced by the disease and survivors after a few years were located in what is now Monsefú.

The city's municipal government was established in the 1870s, replacing the Municipal Agency (Agencia Municipal) and establishing the office of mayor.

In the early 1880s, the Chilean Army, under the command of Patricio Lynch, occupied the area and its surroundings during the War of the Pacific, where infrastructure was built by the Chilean authorities for both the locals and the troops' use, with the latter residing in a barracks. After the war, the town was elevated to city level on October 26, 1888 at the request of deputy Manuel María Izaga, under the presidency of Andrés Avelino Cáceres.

== Government ==
Monsefú is administered by a municipal government that also governs Monsefú District. The Catholic Church in Peru administers both divisions as part of the Diocese of Chiclayo.

=== List of mayors ===
The following is a list of mayors since the establishment of a municipal government:

Mayor	Party	Term begin	Term end
José Ramos Llontop y Laines (Note: As head of the Agencia Municipal prior to the establishment of the Municipality.)			1870
José Tomás Escajadillo (Note: First mayor of the Council of Monsefú.)			1872
Eusebio Ferré Rodríguez		1888	1889
Dr. José Andrés Llontop C		1890	1892
José Llontop Farro		1892	1893
Juan Diez Llontop		1893	1894
Eusebio Ferré Rodríguez		1894	1897
José Leonardo Rojas			1898
Eusebio Ferré Rodríguez			1899
José Leonardo Rojas			1901
Manuel Barco			1903
Joaquín Llontop Rodríguez		1903	1906
Eusebio Bravo		1907	1908
Eulogio Burga Llontop		1909	1912
José Dolores Escajadillo		1913	1914
José Ramos Llontop Pisfil		1915	1916
Dr. Manuel Ríos		1917	1918
Pedro Manuel Alvarado		1919	1922
Abraham Rivera Carranzas		1922	1924
Pascual Mussilo Cilumbriello		1924	1927
Héctor Bravo Llontop		1927	1929
Héctor Boggio Aramburú		1929	1931
Dr. Manuel Senmache Sánchez		1931	1933
Francisco Esacajadillo S.		1933	1934
Carlos Diez Uceda		1934	1936
José Clodomiro Soto Ortíz		1936	1938
Mariano Pisfil		1938	1943
Dr. Miguel Custodio Pisfil		1943	1946
Cecilio Custodio Oliva			1947
Alfredo Delgado Llontop		1947	1948
José R. Vallejos U.		1948	1948
Elíseo Flores Castro		1948	1949
Francisco Escajadillo S.		1949	1949
Fernando Bullón S.		1950	1951
Alejandro Llontop M.		1951	1951
Tomás Garnique Llontop		1952	1954
José Leónidas Llontop		1954	1954
José Vallejo U.			1955
Dr. Ismael Bravo Arenas			1956
Bartolomé Burga González			1957
José Dolores Soto		1958	1960
Dr. Manuel Senmache Sánchez		1961	1962
Juan Manuel Yaipén Mechán			1963
Rev. Fr. Carlos O'Conroy		1963	1964
Juan Renato Custodio		1964	1966
Ángel Bartra Gonzales	AP-DC Alliance	1967	1972
Oscar Salazar Chafloque		1973	1974
Limber Chero Ballena		1975	1977
Ángel Fenco Lluen	Acción Popular	1981	1983
Víctor Custodio López	APRA	1984	1986
Víctor Custodio López	APRA	1987	1989
Miguel Ángel Bartra	FREDEMO	1990	1993
Miguel Ángel Bartra	Acción Popular	1993	1995
Teodoro Custodio Diez	L. I. № 9 Unidos	1996	1998
Boris Bartra Grosso	Adelante Chiclayo	1999	2002
Rita Ayasta de Díaz	Partido Reconstrucción Democrática	2003	2006
Lázaro Puicón Albino	Amistad Solidaria Independiente	2007	2010
Rita Ayasta Giles	M. I. Todos por Lambayeque	2011	2014
Miguel Ángel Bartra	APP	2015	2018
Manuel Pisfil Míñope	APRA	2019	2022
Erwin Huertas Uceda	Acción Popular	2023	Incumbent

== Geography ==
=== Climate ===
The city has a varied semitropical temperature, since part of its territory is on the shore of the sea, and another is located in the valley of the Reque River.

Climate data for Monsefú
Month	Jan	Feb	Mar	Apr	May	Jun	Jul	Aug	Sep	Oct	Nov	Dec	Year
Mean daily maximum °C (°F)	29.7 (85.5)	30.4 (86.7)	31 (88)	29.3 (84.7)	27.3 (81.1)	25.2 (77.4)	24.1 (75.4)	23.6 (74.5)	22.8 (73.0)	24.6 (76.3)	25.5 (77.9)	28.3 (82.9)	26.8 (80.3)
Daily mean °C (°F)	24.5 (76.1)	25.4 (77.7)	25.7 (78.3)	24.1 (75.4)	22.5 (72.5)	20.7 (69.3)	19.6 (67.3)	19.1 (66.4)	19 (66)	19.9 (67.8)	20.6 (69.1)	22.8 (73.0)	22.0 (71.6)
Mean daily minimum °C (°F)	19.4 (66.9)	20.4 (68.7)	20.4 (68.7)	19 (66)	17.7 (63.9)	16.2 (61.2)	15.2 (59.4)	14.7 (58.5)	15.2 (59.4)	15.2 (59.4)	15.8 (60.4)	17.3 (63.1)	17.2 (63.0)
Average precipitation mm (inches)	2.0 (0.08)	2.0 (0.08)	7.0 (0.28)	2.0 (0.08)	1.0 (0.04)	0.0 (0.0)	0.0 (0.0)	0.0 (0.0)	0.0 (0.0)	1.0 (0.04)	1.0 (0.04)	1.0 (0.04)	1.4 (0.06)
Source: climate-data.org

== Culture ==
The city is known for its food and handicrafts, both on display at its annual FEXTICUM festival, named in 1973 by Professor Limberg Chero Ballena and held in July during the Fiestas Patrias. It is also the home of cumbia groups Grupo 5 and Hermanos Yaipen.

== See also ==
- War of the Pacific
