= Zaña Valley (archaeology) =

Archaeological site in Peru

Coordinates: 6.9341°S 79.6145°W

Zaña Valley is a designated archaeological area in northern Peru. The valley is located southeast of the city of Chiclayo. The Zaña River is often dry in its lower course, but occasionally has torrential flows. The city of Zaña is the principal settlement in the valley. The valley contains the earliest known canals in South America. These engineering belongs to a preceramic period and consists of small stone-lined canals that drew water from uphill streams in the Andes Mountains. Accelerator Mass Spectrometer dating of aggregate flecks of charcoal from the oldest canal was to 6705 + 75 14C. Archaeologists believe that the canals were used as early as 6,700 and 4,500 years ago. A temple associated with more than one cultural period also has been discovered in the valley.

== Canals ==
Tom Dillehay and his archaeological team from Vanderbilt University discovered canals in 1989 that are confirmed to be approximately 5,400 years old, but the importance of the canals has been uncovered only in more recent field study. The placement and slope of the canals demonstrates engineering planning. The canals were more or less u-shaped, symmetrical, and shallow. Stones lining the sides of the canals are thought to have been used to protect against erosion. The canals range in size and are all built to rely on gravity to draw water downward, from an upper canal to crops below.

The upkeep for these canals also reveals social organization of labor. The construction and maintenance of these canals required a lot of work from the entire community. Dillehay states that the engineering of these canals compares to early canals in the Old World as they rely on gravity to draw water over short distances, where it could be easily managed much like the canals in Pharaonic Egypt or the kingdoms of Mesopotamia. This allowed for a connection and communication within the community, as the responsibilities were shared amongst everyone. Dillehay states that he does not believe there was a central leader directing the building of these canals as the building of these cananls was during the very early stages of the Andean Society when organization of the surrounding areas shows no signs of social hierarchy.

== 2019 excavations ==
In November 2019, Peruvian archaeologists led by Walter Alva discovered a 3,000-year-old, 130 feet long megalithic temple with 21 tombs in the Oyotún district of the valley. They initially interpreted the temple as an artifact of a 'water cult', abandoned around 250 BC. One of the tombs was associated with the Formative period. It contained an adult male and a ceramic bottle with two spouts and a bridge handle. Later, the site was used as a burial ground by the Chumy people and twenty tombs belonging to the people of Chumy were discovered.

Excavations revealed that as many as three construction phases took place in the building of the temple. The first phase was between 1500 BC-800 BC when people built the foundations of the building from cone-shaped clay. The second phase was between 800 BC-400 BC when the megalithic temple was built under the influence of the pre-Inca civilization known as the Chavín culture. Finally, a third phase was during 400 BC-100 BC when people added circular pillars used to hold up the roof of the temple.

== 2024 excavations ==
In June 2024, archaeologists from the Field Museum, Chicago under the leadership of Luis Muro Ynoñán discovered a 4,000-year-old temple at La Otra Banda site in the Saña district. The temple walls were decorated with intricate images of figures with human bodies, bird heads, and reptilian claws. Skeletal remains of three adults were found.

== See also ==
- Ancient Peru
- Andean preceramic
- Úcupe
