= Zaña =

Zaña Saña
- town
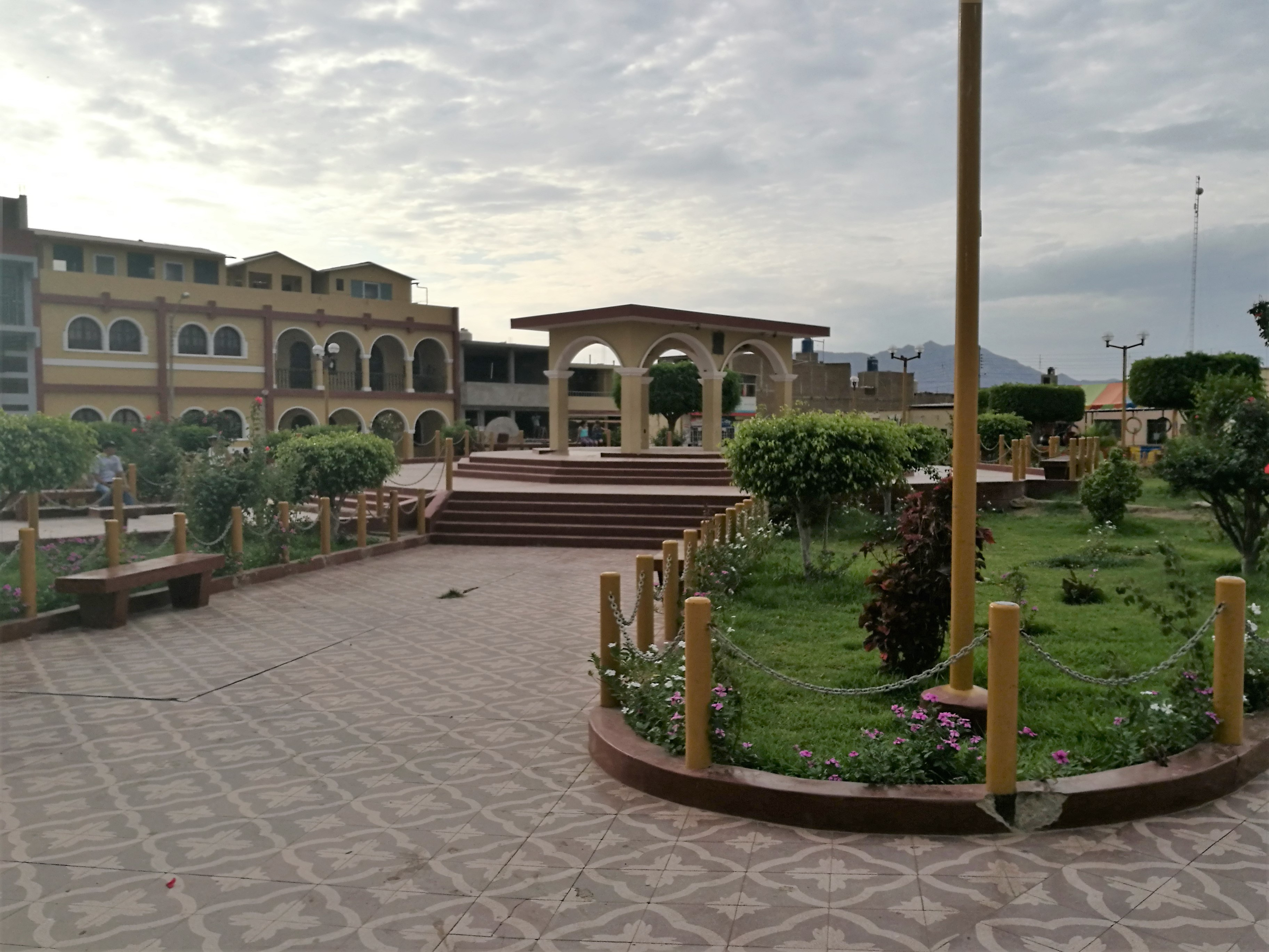
- The main plaza in Zaña.
- Interactive map of Zaña
- Location in Peru
- Coordinates: 6°55′14″S 79°35′06″W
- Country: Peru
- Region: Lambayeque
- Province: Chiclayo
- District: Zaña
- Elevation: 58 m (190 ft)

Population (2017)
  - Total: 4,510
- Postal code: 14711

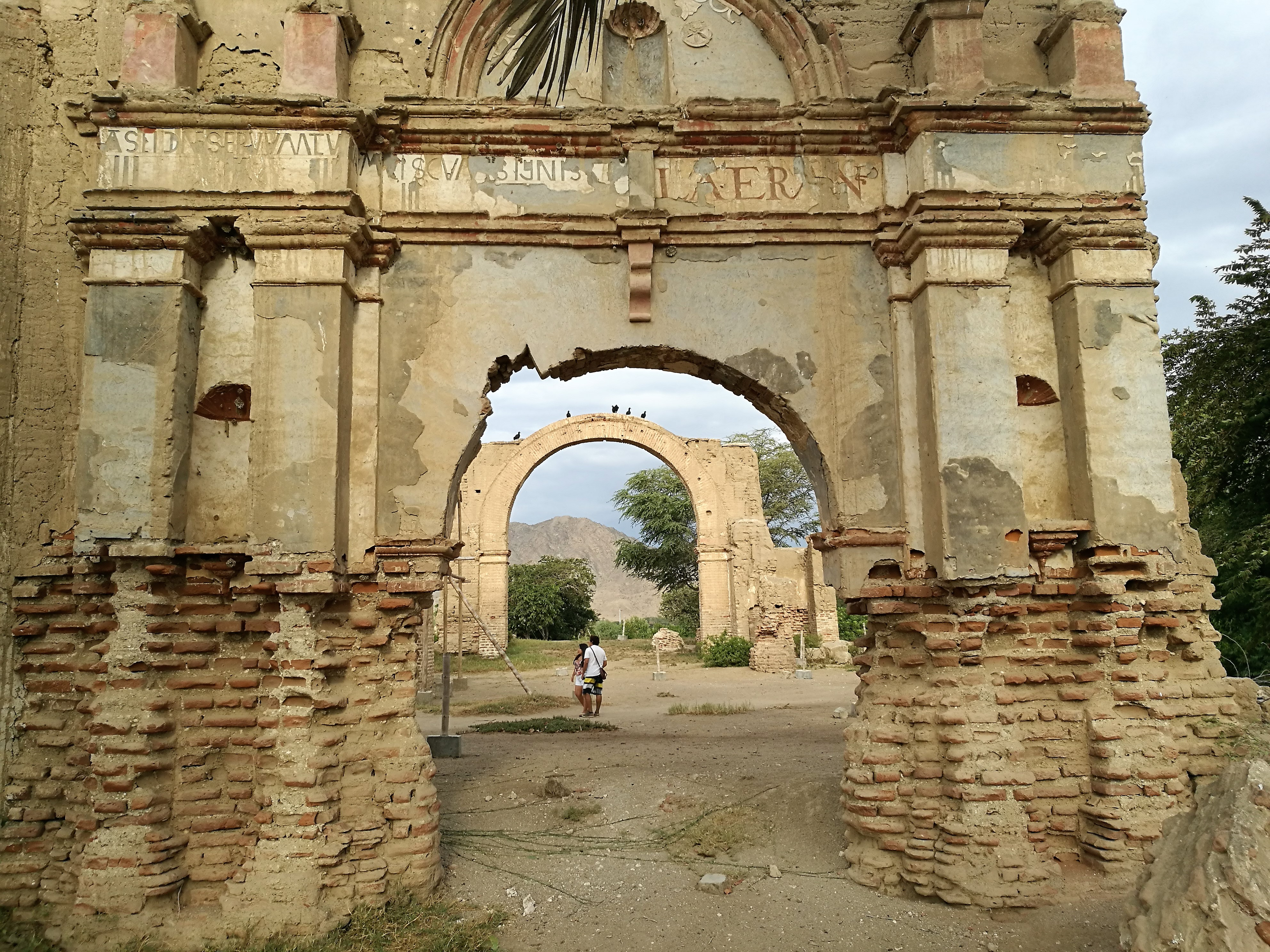
The ruins of a church destroyed by the flood of 1720.

Zaña or Saña (Mochica: Çañap ) is the capital of Zaña District in the Chiclayo Province of Lambayeque region in northern Peru. It is located 25 kilometres (16 miles) inland from the Pacific Ocean at an elevation of 58 metres (190 ft) in the valley of the Zaña River. Zaña had a population of 4,510 in 2017. The town was founded in 1563 by the Spanish conquerors of Peru. The Zaña Valley became a major area of sugar cane production and Zaña was one of the most important cities of colonial Peru. The wealth of Zaña attracted English pirates who raided the city in 1686. A flood destroyed Zaña in 1720 and it never recovered its previous importance. Ruins from the flood still exist at the edge of the 21st century town.

Imported African slaves made up a major part of the population of the city and its environs during its heyday. The Afro-Peruvian Museum is in Zaña and in 2017 the museum was declared by UNESCO to be a Site of Remembrance of Slavery and African Cultural Heritage.

== History ==
The city of Zaña (or Saña, as it was known in its early history) was founded in November 1563 by Baltasar Rodriguez with the name of Santiago de Miraflores de Zaña. Conceived as a way-station between the growing towns of Piura to its north and Trujillo to its south, Zaña was soon designated as a city and became the center of an irrigated valley producing sugar cane, wheat, vegetables, and algarrobo (Prosopis). Zaña prospered and attracted rich Spaniards who imported African slaves to work on their haciendas.

In March 1686, Edward Davis, an English pirate, raided Zaña, carrying off the portable wealth of the city and the daughter of a prominent citizen. On March 15, 1720 the city was completely destroyed by a flood in an El Niño year and the Spaniards largely abandoned the town, leaving behind the African slaves who re-created a much diminished community and town. At the end of the 18th century, Zaña had a population of little more than 500 people, of whom 90 were Africans ("negros") and 370 were mestizos of mixed African and indigenous ("indios") heritage. Not a single indigenous person was enumerated in the census.

Slavery was abolished in Peru in 1854, but many of the Afro-Peruvian residents of Zaña continued to work in the sugar industry, especially on the hacienda of the Aspillaga family in Cayalti, 5 kilometres (3.1 miles) from Zaña which was one of the largest sugar producers in Peru in the early 20th century.

In the 1950s Afro-Peruvian siblings Nicomedes and Victoria Santa Cruz initiated a re-discovery of Afro-Peruvian culture, including music and the décima, a style of poetry. Zaña became a symbol of the struggle of Afro-Peruvians to find a place in Peruvian culture. The décimas recount the history of the Afro-Peruvians and a popular song is titled Zaña. In 2005, the Afro-Peruvian Museum opened in Zaňa.

== Climate ==
The nearest climatic station to Zaña is in Cayalti, 3 km (1.9 miles) west. The Köppen Classification of Cayalti's climate is BWh (hot desert). Cayalti receives only 77.6 millimetres (3.06 in) of precipitation annually, most of it during the months of February and March. For much of the year, compared to many low-elevation tropical deserts, temperatures are mild due to the influence of the cold Humboldt Current that flows offshore in the Pacific Ocean. Average monthly temperatures range from 27.3 °C (81.1 °F) in February and March to 20.75 °C (69.35 °F) in August. The lower temperatures in the Austral winter are due to the influence of garua, a cold, misty fog that hangs over the land.

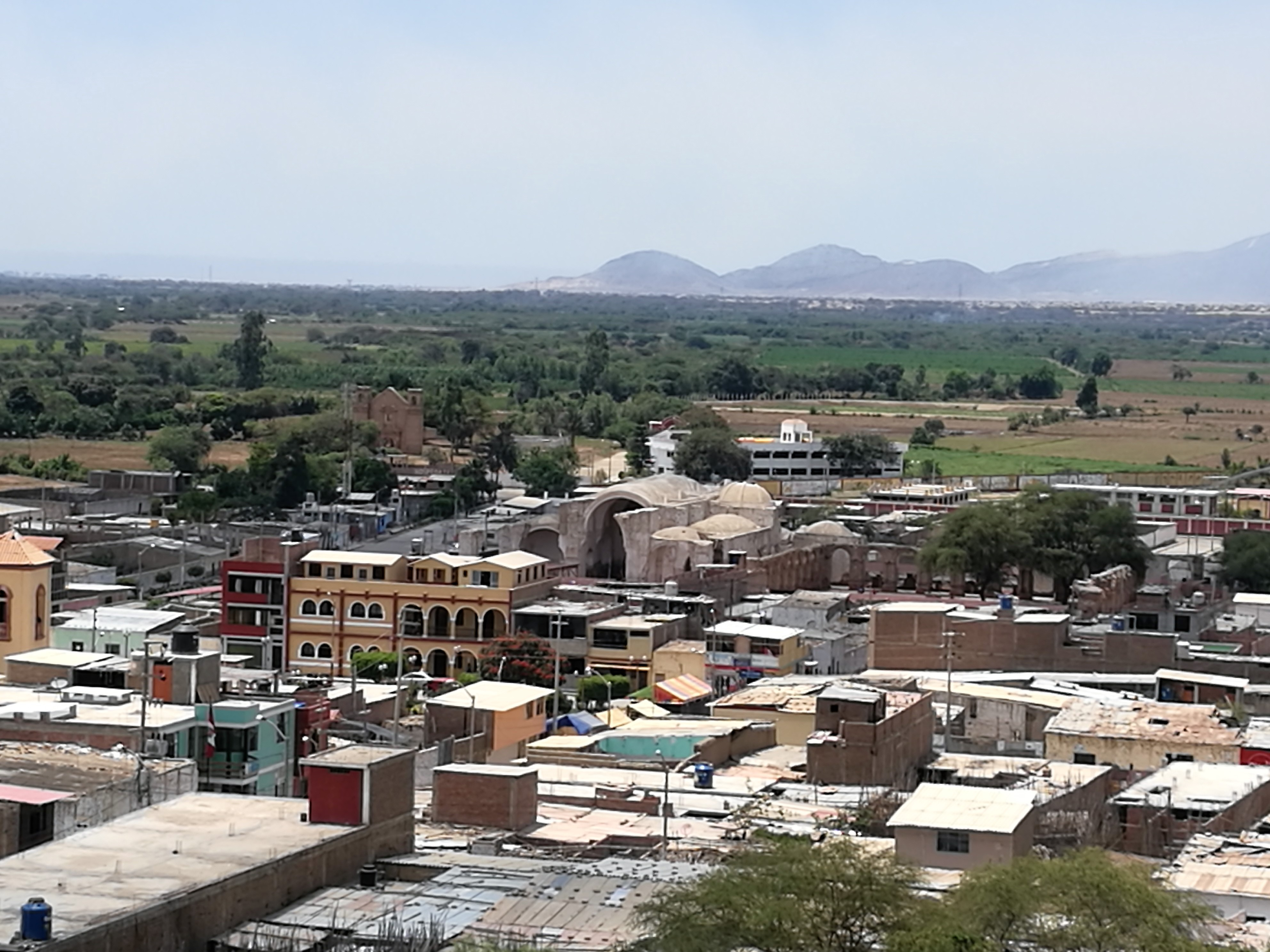
The town of Zaña.

Climate data for Cayalti (near Zaña), elevation 90 m (300 ft), (1991–2020)
Month	Jan	Feb	Mar	Apr	May	Jun	Jul	Aug	Sep	Oct	Nov	Dec	Year
Mean daily maximum °C (°F)	33.5 (92.3)	34.1 (93.4)	34.1 (93.4)	32.8 (91.0)	30.8 (87.4)	28.5 (83.3)	27.5 (81.5)	27.5 (81.5)	28.3 (82.9)	29.1 (84.4)	30.2 (86.4)	31.7 (89.1)	30.7 (87.2)
Mean daily minimum °C (°F)	19.3 (66.7)	20.5 (68.9)	20.5 (68.9)	18.9 (66.0)	17.1 (62.8)	15.4 (59.7)	14.1 (57.4)	14.0 (57.2)	14.6 (58.3)	15.2 (59.4)	15.6 (60.1)	17.6 (63.7)	16.9 (62.4)
Average precipitation mm (inches)	5.5 (0.22)	24.2 (0.95)	24.8 (0.98)	8.1 (0.32)	1.4 (0.06)	0.5 (0.02)	0.5 (0.02)	0.3 (0.01)	1.5 (0.06)	2.4 (0.09)	3.3 (0.13)	5.1 (0.20)	77.6 (3.06)
Source: National Meteorology and Hydrology Service of Peru
