= Monsefú District =

Coordinates: 6.8819°S 79.8696°W

Monsefú
- District
- Coat of arms
- Interactive map of Monsefú
- Country: Peru
- Region: Lambayeque
- Province: Chiclayo
- Capital: Monsefú

Government
  - Mayor: Manuel Pisfíl Míñope

Area
  - Total: 44.94 km^{2} (17.35 sq mi)
- Elevation: 11 m (36 ft)

Population (2017)
  - Total: 32,225
  - Density: 717.1/km^{2} (1,857/sq mi)
- Time zone: UTC-5 (PET)
- UBIGEO: 140108

Monsefú District is one of twenty districts of the province Chiclayo in Peru. The district belogs to the Catholic Diocese of Chiclayo.
