= Picsi District =

Coordinates: 6.7176°S 79.7709°W

Picsi
- District
- Coat of arms
- Interactive map of Picsi
- Country: Peru
- Region: Lambayeque
- Province: Chiclayo
- Capital: Picsi

Government
  - Mayor: Carlos Alberto Sánchez Medina

Area
  - Total: 56.92 km^{2} (21.98 sq mi)
- Elevation: 40 m (130 ft)

Population (2005 census)
  - Total: 8,346
  - Density: 146.6/km^{2} (379.8/sq mi)
- Time zone: UTC-5 (PET)
- UBIGEO: 140111
- Website: munipicsi.gob.pe

Picsi District is one of twenty districts of the province Chiclayo in Peru.
