= Atlético Barrio Frigorífico =

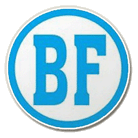
- Full name: Atlético Barrio Frigorífico
- Founded: June 19, 1939; 86 years ago
- Ground: Telmo Carbajo, Callao
- Capacity: 5,000
- League: Copa Perú
Home colours

Atlético Barrio Frigorífico is a Peruvian football club, playing in the city of Callao, Peru.

== History ==
The club was founded on June 19, 1939, in the Frigorífico neighborhood of the port of Callao.

In 1973, after winning the Liga Provincial del Callao, the club qualified for the Reclasificatorio 13, where it faced the district champions of Lima. In that competition, it finished in first place, tied on points with Deportivo Helvético. The tiebreaker match, played on February 20, 1974, under head coach Eloy Campos, ended in a 2–0 victory with goals from Roberto Zevallos and Orlando Córdova, securing promotion to the Peruvian Primera División for the 1974 season.

In the 1974 Torneo Descentralizado, the club finished in 20th place and was relegated, having the lowest position among the teams from Metropolitan Lima.

In the 2007 Copa Perú, the club reached the Regional Stage, competing in Region IV, where it was eliminated in the first round by Cooperativa Bolognesi de Barranco. In the following years, the club continued to participate in the Callao District League until 2018.

After a period of inactivity, the club returned to competition in 2024, starting in the Segunda División Distrital del Callao. That same year, it won the title and earned promotion back to the First District Division.

== Statistics and results in First Division ==
=== League history ===
Season	Div.	Pos.	Pl.	W	D	L	GF	GA	P	Notes
1974	1st	20	42	6	12	24	33	78	24	20/22 Regular season

== Honours ==
=== Senior titles ===
Keys

- Record
- ^{(s)} Shared record

Type	Competition	Titles	Runner-up	Winning years	Runner-up years
Regional (League)	Reclasificatorio Regional	1	—	1974 Región 13	—
Regional (League)	Primera División Amateur del Callao	3	5	1965, 1968, 1973	1952, 1954, 1966, 1967, 1969
Regional (League)	Liga Distrital del Callao	—	3	—	1994, 1999, 2006
Regional (League)	Segunda División Distrital del Callao	1	—	2024	—
Regional (League)	Segunda División Regional de Lima y Callao	—	1	—	1949 Serie B
Regional (League)	Segunda División Amateur del Callao	—	1	—	1961

== See also ==
- List of football clubs in Peru
- Peruvian football league system
