= Santa Rosa District, Chiclayo =

Coordinates: 6.8778°S 79.9235°W

Santa Rosa District Distrito de Santa Rosa
- District
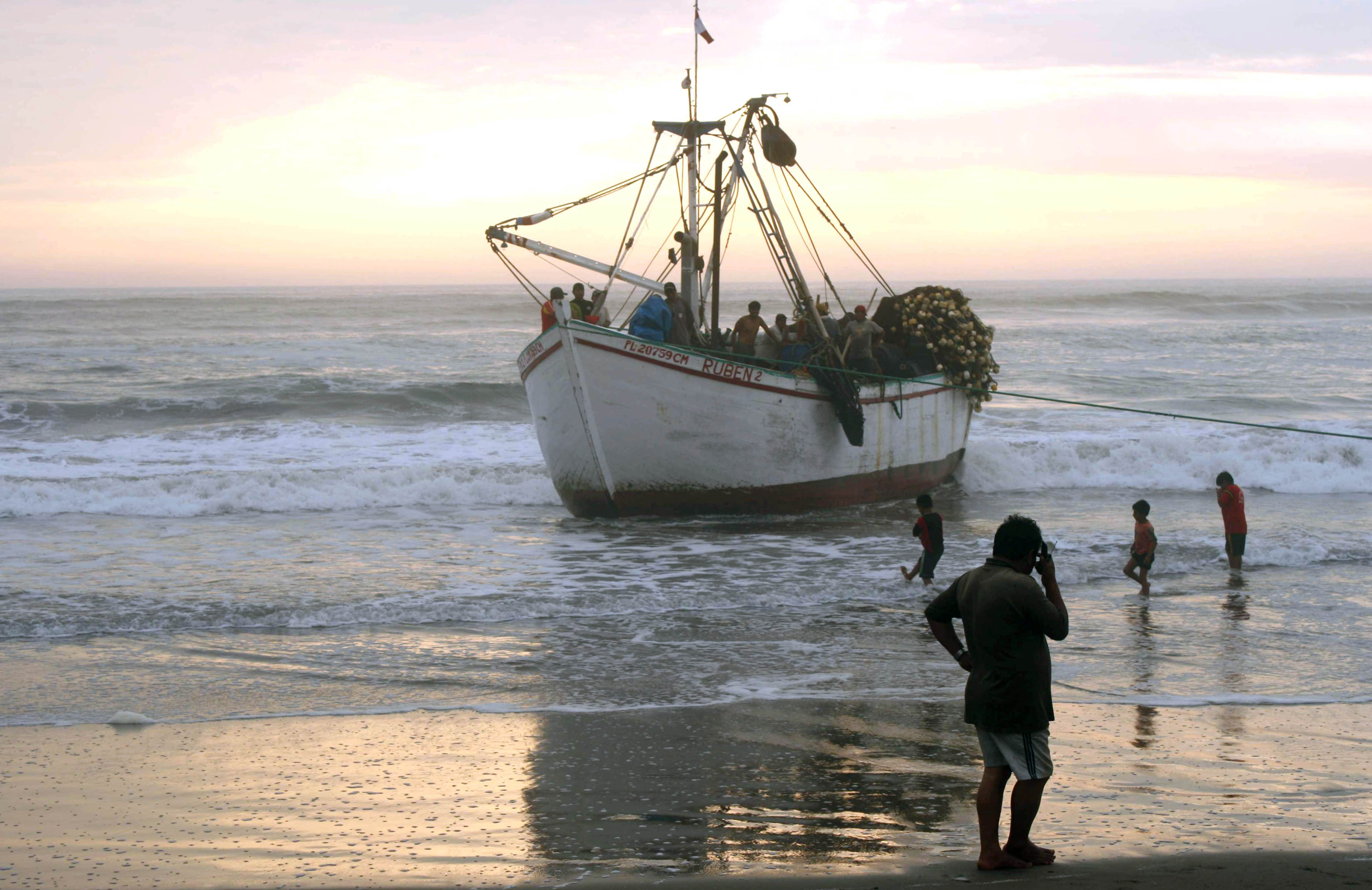
- Interactive map of Santa Rosa District
- Country: Peru
- Region: Lambayeque
- Province: Chiclayo
- Founded: August 2, 1920
- Capital: Santa Rosa

Government
  - Mayor: Andres Palma Gordillo

Area
  - Total: 14.09 km^{2} (5.44 sq mi)
- Elevation: 10 m (33 ft)

Population (2005 census)
  - Total: 10,935
  - Density: 776.1/km^{2} (2,010/sq mi)
- Time zone: UTC-5 (PET)
- UBIGEO: 140114

Santa Rosa District is one of twenty districts of the province Chiclayo in Peru.
