= Unión Pesquero =

- Full name: Club Unión Pesquero
- Founded: March 13, 1965 (as Deportivo Coishco)
- Dissolved: 1985
- Ground: Estadio Mariscal Nieto, Ilo
- League: Copa Perú
Home colours

Unión Pesquero was a Peruvian football club that played in the city of Ilo, Moquegua, Peru.

== History ==
Club Unión Pesquero was founded on March 13, 1965, under the name Club Deportivo Coishco.

The club was crowned back-to-back Liga Departamental de Moquegua champions in 1972 and 1973, earning qualification for the Reclasificatorio Regional. In the 1974 edition, Unión Pesquero competed in Reclassification Group 11, which featured representatives from Moquegua and Tacna. At this stage, the club eliminated Coronel Bolognesi, securing promotion to the 1974 Torneo Descentralizado.

In the 1974 Torneo Descentralizado, the club was relegated to the 1975 Copa Perú after finishing bottom of the table in 22nd place with just 22 points.

Back in the Copa Perú system, the club was crowned Liga Departamental de Moquegua champions once again in 1976; however, it failed to secure promotion to the Peruvian First Division. The club later dissolved in 1985 after failing to appear in that year’s Liga Distrital de Ilo.

== Statistics and results in First Division ==
=== League history ===
Season	Div.	Pos.	Pl.	W	D	L	GF	GA	P	Notes
1974	1st	22	42	4	14	24	27	79	22	22/22 Regular Season

== Coach ==
- (Peru) Mario Gonzales (1974)

== Honours ==
=== Senior titles ===
Keys

- Record
- ^{(s)} Shared record

Type	Competition	Titles	Runner-up	Winning years	Runner-up years
Regional (League)	Liga Departamental de Moquegua	3	—	1972, 1973, 1976	—

== See also ==
- List of football clubs in Peru
- Peruvian football league system
