= Pablo Muchotrigo =

Peruvian footballer (born 1953)

Hugo Lobatón
- Muchotrigo in 1977

Personal information
- Full name: Pablo Muchotrigo León
- Date of birth: 14 October 1953 (age 73)
- Place of birth: Ate District, Lima, Peru
- Position: Forward

Senior career*
Years	Team	Apps	(Gls)
1971	Defensor Lima		
1972	Deportivo CARSA		
1973	Atlético Chalaco		
1974	Cienciano		(36)
1975	Alianza Lima		
1976–1977	León de Huánuco		
1978–1979	Atlético Chalaco		
1980	Melgar		
1981	Deportivo Junín		
1982	ADT Tarma		
1983–1984	UTC de Cajamarca		
- * Club domestic league appearances and goals

Pablo Muchotrigo León (born 14 October 1953) is a Peruvian retired footballer. Nicknamed "Chacha", he played as a forward for a wide variety of different clubs throughout the 1970s and the early 1980s, notably being the top goalscorer of the 1974 Torneo Descentralizado for Cienciano.

== Club career ==
Muchotrigo began his career playing for local clubs within Vitarte following a series of moves. He enjoyed considerable success to the point of Sporting Cristal goalkeeper Luis Rubiños who had just returned from the 1970 FIFA World Cup took interest and tried to convince him to sign for the Celestes. However, Muchotrigo's father was friends with an assistant coach of Defensor Lima with Muchotrigo choosing to sign with the latter. His senior debut came during the Carasucias' tour of Ecuador, scoring two goals throughout. He left such an impression that by the time of the club's return to Peru, the press took great interest in him as he would be one of the main contributors toward the club's 3rd place finish at the 1971 Torneo Descentralizado. Despite this, Muchotrigo chose to play in the lower tiers of Peruvian football for Deportivo CARSA during the 1972 Copa Perú as despite initial success within the Región Sur, ultimately saw a dismal performance in the final stage as the club would only achieve a single draw against Ciencano. He later returned to the top-flight of Peruvian football with Atlético Chalaco for their 1973 season at an average 7th place. Muchotrigo would experience a career high in the following 1974 Torneo Descentralizado as following his signing with Cienciano, he became the top goalscorer of Peru with 34 registered goals alongside an additional 2 unofficial goals. This saw Muchotrigo being one of the top goalscorers for Melgar within a single season until Ysrael Zúñiga would later match his record in the 1999 Torneo Descentralizado.

Due to this success, Bolivian club The Strongest took an interest in Muchotrigo and the management of the Imperiales attempted to sign him over for the 1975 Primera División de Bolivia. However, club president Augusto Achahui Palomino had wanted to give him a piece of land in Cuzco as well as a blank check for Muchotrigo to write his desired sum for him to remain in the club. This led to complications to the point of Muchotrigo's bank account getting closed and in protest, returned to Lima. During the 1975 Torneo Descentralizado, Muchotrigo was watching a match between Sporting Cristal and Alianza Lima with the Blanquiazules finding themselves losing 1–0. After spotting Muchotrigo, the management convinced him to play throughout the remainder of the match with just five minutes remaining. Against all odds, Muchotrigo scored the equalizer with Muchotrigo being paid double his initial desired salary. Throughout his career within Alianza Lima, he became friends with César Cueto and the two shared an attacking chemistry with each other to score goals. However, by the end of the season, Muchotrigo found himself being a reserve for the club with inconsistent as they had preferred still using their main goalscorer Juan Rivero Arias. Even with Muchotrigo choosing to sign himself with León de Huánuco for the following 1976 season, the 1975 season would see Alianza Lima win their first title of the 1970s. The remainder of his career was spent within clubs outside of Lima due to Muchotrigo's personal preference as he would play for León de Huánuco, Atlético Chalaco where he was part of the runners-up squad for the 1979 Torneo Descentralizado, Melgar, Deportivo Junín, ADT Tarma. He spent his final two seasons with UTC de Cajamarca with his initial season with the club seeing him without pay for five months. He then retired during the 1984 Torneo Descentralizado as he retired due to being repeatedly injured.

== Later life ==
Following his retirement from football, Muchotrigo worked at his mother's funeral home at his old neighborhood at Vitarte. He continues to work there alongside his brother.
