= Lagunas District, Chiclayo =

Coordinates: 6.9901°S 79.6218°W

Lagunas District
- District
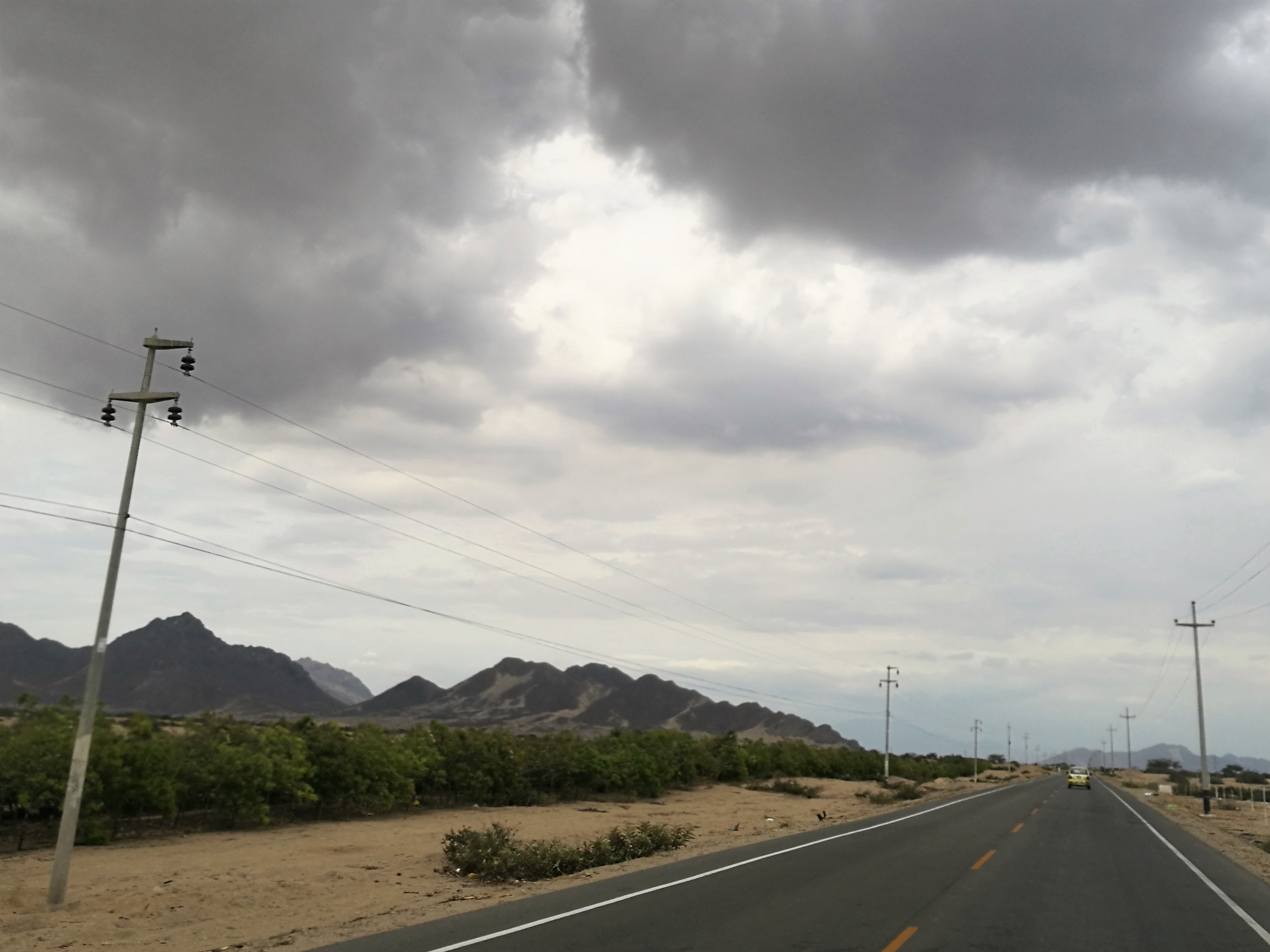
- Interactive map of Lagunas District
- Country: Peru
- Region: Lambayeque
- Province: Chiclayo
- Founded: February 2, 1857
- Capital: Mocupe

Government
  - Mayor: Pedro Milton Pejerrey Manzanares

Area
  - Total: 429.27 km^{2} (165.74 sq mi)
- Elevation: 33 m (108 ft)

Population (2005 census)
  - Total: 8,831
  - Density: 20.57/km^{2} (53.28/sq mi)
- Time zone: UTC-5 (PET)
- UBIGEO: 140107

Lagunas District is one of twenty districts of the province Chiclayo in Peru.
