= Bancada Socialista =

Peruvian parliamentary group

Socialist Caucus Bancada Socialista
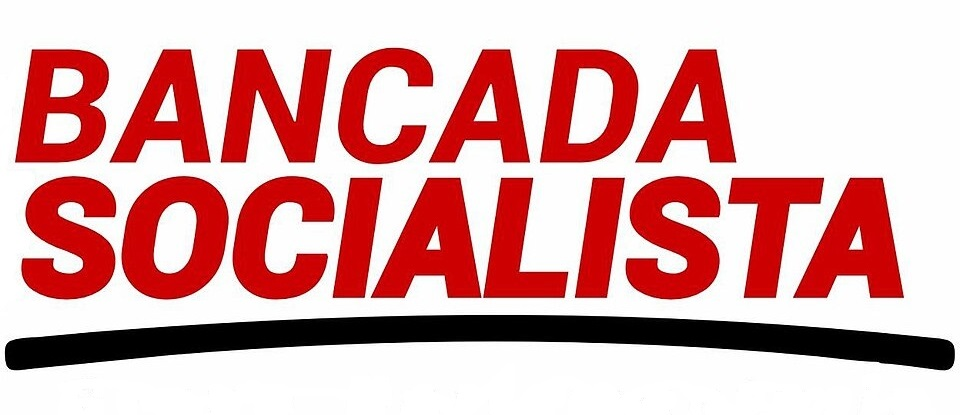
- Spokesperson: Álex Flores
- Founded: July 5, 2024
- Split from: Free Peru
- Headquarters: Lima
- Ideology: Democratic socialism Mariáteguism
- Political position: Left-wing politics
- Colors: Red
- Congress: 5 / 130

Website
- Bancada Socialista

The Socialist Caucus (Spanish:Bancada Socialista) is a left-wing parliamentary group in the Peruvian Congress. It was formed in July 2024.

== History ==
During the 2021-2026 parliamentary period, several congressmen elected under the Free Peru party resigned from the party or disengaged politically, forming a dissident bloc.

In July 2024, these congressmen formally formed the Bancada Socialista and submitted a list to the Congressional Board of Directors, with Silvana Robles as their candidate to preside over that body.

The motions in Impeachment of Dina Boluarte were promoted by the Bancada Socialista.

== Members ==
The congressmen who make it up are:

Congressman	District
Jaime Quito	Arequipa
Álex Flores	Ayacucho
Alfredo Pariona	Huancavelica
Silvana Robles	Junín
Pasión Dávila	Pasco
