= 1974 Torneo Descentralizado =

Torneo Descentralizado
- Season: 1974
- Dates: 24 March 1974 – 2 March 1975
- Champions: Universitario
- Relegated: Walter Ormeño; Piérola; Atlético Barrio Frigorífico; Unión Pesquero
- Copa Libertadores: Universitario; Unión Huaral
- Top goalscorer: Pablo Muchotrigo (32 goals)

The 1974 season of the Torneo Descentralizado, the top category of Peruvian football, was played by 22 teams. The top six qualified to the final group stage. The relegation system was as follows: The last-placed team was relegated, the worst Lima-based, Arequipa-based and Lima Province-based teams were relegated. The national champions were Universitario.

== Teams ==
=== Team changes ===
Promoted from 1974 Reclasificatorio Regional	Relegated from 1973 Primera División
▲ Alfonso Ugarte ▲ Atlético Barrio Frigorífico ▲ Carlos A. Mannucci ▲ Deportivo Junín ▲ Piérola ▲ Unión Pesquero ▲ Unión Huaral ▲ Walter Ormeño	▼ Sportivo Huracán (RR) ▼ Atlético Torino (RR) ▼ José Gálvez (17th) ▼ Deportivo SIMA (18th)

=== Stadia locations ===
Locations of the 1974 Primera División teams

Team	City	Stadium	Capacity	Field
Alfonso Ugarte	Puno	Enrique Torres Belón	20,000	Grass
Alianza Lima	La Victoria, Lima	Alejandro Villanueva	35,000	Grass
Atlético Barrio Frigorífico	Callao	Miguel Grau	15,000	Grass
Atlético Chalaco	Callao	Miguel Grau	15,000	Grass
Atlético Grau	Piura	Miguel Grau (Piura)	25,000	Grass
Carlos A. Mannucci	Trujillo	Mansiche	24,000	Grass
Cienciano	Cusco	Garcilaso	40,000	Grass
CNI	Iquitos	Max Augustín	24,000	Grass
Defensor Lima	Breña, Lima	Nacional	45,750	Grass
Deportivo Junín	Huancayo	Huancayo	20,000	Grass
Deportivo Municipal	Cercado de Lima	Nacional	45,750	Grass
Juan Aurich	Chiclayo	Elías Aguirre	24,500	Grass
León de Huánuco	Huánuco	Heraclio Tapia	15,000	Grass
Melgar	Arequipa	Mariano Melgar	20,000	Grass
Piérola	Arequipa	Mariano Melgar	20,000	Grass
Sport Boys	Callao	Miguel Grau	15,000	Grass
Sporting Cristal	Rímac, Lima	Nacional	45,750	Grass
Unión Huaral	Huaral	Julio Lores Colan	10,000	Grass
Unión Pesquero	Ilo	Mariscal Nieto	8,000	Grass
Unión Tumán	Tumán	Eugenio Zapata Mingoya	8,000	Grass
Universitario	Breña, Lima	Nacional	45,750	Grass
Walter Ormeño	Cañete	Oscar Ramos Cabieses	8,000	Grass

== First stage ==
=== Standings ===
Pos	Team	Pld	W	D	L	GF	GA	GD	Pts	Qualification or relegation
1	Universitario	42	25	15	2	96	41	+55	65	Liguilla Final
2	Unión Huaral	42	25	12	5	76	37	+39	62	Liguilla Final
3	Defensor Lima	42	21	14	7	77	37	+40	56	Liguilla Final
4	Alianza Lima	42	21	10	11	75	43	+32	52	Liguilla Final
5	Unión Tumán	42	20	12	10	63	43	+20	52	Liguilla Final
6	CNI	42	17	17	8	67	49	+18	51	Liguilla Final
7	Sporting Cristal	42	19	12	11	74	60	+14	50	
8	Atlético Chalaco	42	17	14	11	57	43	+14	48	
9	Juan Aurich (O)	42	16	14	12	68	55	+13	46	Triangular de Revalidación
10	Cienciano	42	16	13	13	63	49	+14	45	
11	Alfonso Ugarte	42	13	16	13	72	60	+12	42	
12	Melgar	42	14	13	15	48	47	+1	41	
13	Deportivo Municipal	42	15	10	17	56	65	−9	40	
14	León de Huánuco	42	14	11	17	48	68	−20	39	
15	Atlético Grau	42	12	14	16	69	78	−9	38	
16	Sport Boys	42	9	17	16	50	59	−9	35	
17	Walter Ormeño (R)	42	10	11	21	41	65	−24	31	Triangular de Revalidación
18	Deportivo Junín	42	10	11	21	53	79	−26	31	
19	Piérola (R)	42	9	12	21	45	77	−32	30	Triangular de Revalidación
20	Atlético Barrio Frigorífico (R)	42	6	12	24	33	78	−45	24	1975 Copa Perú
21	Carlos A. Mannucci	42	8	8	26	50	96	−46	24	
22	Unión Pesquero (R)	42	4	14	24	27	79	−52	22	1975 Copa Perú

(O) Play-off winners; (R) Relegated

=== Results ===
Home \ Away	UGA	ALI	BFR	CHA	GRA	CAM	CIE	CNI	DEF	JUN	MUN	AUR	LEO	MEL	PIE	SBA	CRI	HUA	PES	TUM	UNI	WOC
Alfonso Ugarte		3–0	—	—	—	—	—	—	—	—	—	—	—	—	—	2–0	1–2	—	—	—	0–0	—
Alianza Lima	3–1		3–1	4–2	5–1	4–0	0–0	0–1	1–3	2–1	2–1	1–1	3–0	4–0	4–0	4–1	1–0	2–3	2–0	1–3	0–3	0–0
Atlético Barrio Frigorífico	—	1–1		—	—	—	—	—	—	—	—	—	—	—	—	1–1	0–0	—	—	—	2–3	—
Atlético Chalaco	—	1–3	—		—	—	—	—	—	—	—	—	—	—	—	1–4	1–1	—	—	—	2–2	—
Atlético Grau	—	2–2	—	—		—	—	—	—	—	—	—	—	—	—	2–2	2–3	—	—	—	2–2	—
Carlos A. Mannucci	—	1–5	—	—	—		—	—	—	—	—	—	—	—	4–3	3–3	1–2	—	—	—	1–5	—
Cienciano	—	1–0	—	—	—	—		—	—	—	—	—	—	1–0	—	2–0	3–3	—	—	—	0–0	—
CNI	—	1–2	—	—	—	—	—		—	—	—	—	—	—	—	0–1	1–1	—	—	—	0–2	—
Defensor Lima	—	0–2	—	—	—	—	—	—		—	—	2–1	—	—	—	3–2	3–0	—	—	—	3–3	—
Deportivo Junín	—	1–2	—	—	—	2–0	—	—	—		—	—	—	—	—	0–2	1–3	—	—	—	0–4	—
Deportivo Municipal	—	1–0	—	—	—	—	—	—	—	—		—	—	—	—	1–0	2–2	—	—	—	2–3	2–2
Juan Aurich	—	1–1	—	—	—	—	—	—	—	—	—		—	—	—	1–1	2–2	—	—	—	3–3	—
León de Huánuco	—	1–1	—	—	—	—	—	—	—	—	—	—		—	—	1–1	1–1	—	—	—	1–2	—
Melgar	—	1–0	—	—	—	—	1–0	—	—	—	—	—	—		—	2–0	1–1	—	—	—	0–0	—
Piérola	—	2–2	—	—	—	—	—	—	—	1–0	—	2–1	—			2–2	2–3	—	—	—	0–3	—
Sport Boys	2–2	2–1	1–3	0–2	2–1	2–2	2–2	1–1	0–1	3–0	2–2	1–1	1–1	0–1	1–0		1–1	1–3	2–0	0–0	1–2	2–1
Sporting Cristal	3–1	0–1	4–0	2–1	1–1	4–1	3–2	0–1	2–1	3–1	2–0	2–3	3–0	2–0	2–4	1–0		1–4	1–1	0–2	1–2	3–2
Unión Huaral	—	0–0	—	—	—	—	—	—	—	—	—	—	—	—	—	3–2	2–1		—	—	0–3	—
Unión Pesquero	—	0–3	—	—	—	—	—	—	—	—	—	—	—	—	—	1–1	1–3	—		—	0–1	—
Unión Tumán	—	0–0	—	—	—	—	—	—	—	—	—	—	—	—	—	1–0	1–3	—	—		2–2	—
Universitario	4–0	2–0	4–0	2–0	2–3	4–0	3–0	3–3	1–1	2–2	5–1	3–2	3–1	2–2	1–1	1–0	2–2	1–2	3–0	1–0		1–0
Walter Ormeño	—	0–2	—	—	—	—	—	—	—	—	1–2	—	—	—	—	0–0	2–0	—	—	—	1–1	

Updated to match(es) played on 1974. Source: https://www.rsssf.org/tablesp/peru74.html
Legend: Blue = home team win; Yellow = draw; Red = away team win.

== Triangular de Revalidación ==
=== Standings ===
Pos	Team	Pld	W	D	L	GF	GA	GD	Pts	Qualification or relegation	AUR	PIE	WAL
1	Juan Aurich	2	2	0	0	4	2	+2	4			1–0	
2	Piérola (R)	2	1	0	1	2	1	+1	2	1975 Copa Perú			2–0
3	Walter Ormeño (R)	2	0	0	2	2	5	−3	0	1975 Copa Perú	2–3		

Legend: Blue = home team win; Yellow = draw; Red = away team win.
(R) Relegated

=== Results ===
5 May 1975
15:30

Piérola	2–0	Walter Ormeño
Flores 21'; Fuentes (pen.)

Estadio Alejandro Villanueva, Lima
Referee: (Chile) Juan Silvano
7 May 1975
15:30

Juan Aurich	1–0	Piérola
Bolívar 43'

Estadio Alejandro Villanueva, Lima
Referee: (Chile) Mario Lira
9 May 1975
15:00

Walter Ormeño	2–3	Juan Aurich
Candela 71' 85'		Arnáez 5'; Cadenillas 20' 76'

Estadio Alejandro Villanueva, Lima
Referee: (Chile) Carlos Robles

== Liguilla Final ==
=== Standings ===
Pos	Team	Pld	W	D	L	GF	GA	GD	Pts	Qualification	UNI	HUA	DEF	ALI	TUM	CNI
1	Universitario (C)	47	28	15	4	101	46	+55	71	1975 Copa Libertadores		1–0		1–3	1–0	
2	Unión Huaral	47	26	13	8	83	46	+37	65	1975 Copa Libertadores			—		—	—
3	Defensor Lima	47	23	14	10	88	47	+41	60		1–2				—	—
4	Alianza Lima	47	24	11	12	87	52	+35	59			3–2	2–0			
5	Unión Tumán	47	22	13	12	72	51	+21	57					3–1		—
6	CNI	47	19	18	10	76	61	+15	56		1–0			3–3		

Legend: Blue = home team win; Yellow = draw; Red = away team win.
(C) Champions

== Top scorers ==
Player	Nationality	Goals	Club
Pablo Muchotrigo	Peru	32	Cienciano
Francisco Gonzales	Peru	27	Defensor Lima
Oswaldo Ramírez	Peru	26	Universitario de Deportes
Juan Rivero Arias	Peru	20	Alianza Lima
Jorge Ramírez	Peru	18	Sport Boys
Juan José Ávalos	Peru	18	Alianza Lima
Juan José Oré	Peru	17	Universitario de Deportes
Andrés Zegarra	Peru	17	Alianza Lima
Oscar Pianetti	Argentina	16	Unión Tumán
César Arnáez	Peru	15	Juan Aurich
Manuel Mellán	Peru	15	Deportivo Municipal
Pedro Ruíz	Peru	14	Unión Huaral
Pedro Alexis González	Argentina	13	Defensor Lima
José del Castillo	Peru	13	Sporting Cristal
Moisés Chumpitaz	Peru	13	FBC Melgar
César Echeandía	Peru	13	Atlético Grau
Enrique Casaretto	Peru	12	Atlético Chalaco
Juan Carlos Oblitas	Peru	12	Universitario de Deportes

== Awards ==
Award	Winner
Best Team	Universitario de Deportes
Golden Boot	Oswaldo Ramírez (Universitario de Deportes)
Manager of the year	Juan Eduardo Hohberg (Universitario de Deportes)
Goalkeeper of the year	Néstor Rafael Verderi (Defensor Lima)
Foreign player of the year	Pedro Alexis González (Defensor Lima)
Young player of the year	Juan José Oré (Universitario de Deportes)
Veteran player of the year	Enrique Casaretto (Atlético Chalaco)
Breakout player	José Velásquez (Alianza Lima)

== See also ==
- 1974 Reclasificatorio Regional
