= FBC Piérola =

- Full name: FBC Piérola
- Nickname(s): Las ardillas
- Founded: 7 May 1922
- Ground: Estadio Mariano Melgar, Arequipa
- Capacity: 20,000
- Chairman: Oswaldo Cabrera
- Manager: Richard Meza
- League: Copa Perú
Home colours	Away colours

FBC Piérola is a Peruvian football club, playing in the city of Arequipa, Peru.

The club was founded in 1922 and plays in the Copa Perú which is the third division of the Peruvian league.

== History ==
The club was founded on 7 May 1922. They played at the highest level of Peruvian football on one occasion, in the 1974 Torneo Descentralizado, before being relegated.

== Rivalries ==
FBC Piérola has had a long-standing rivalry with Melgar, Aurora, Sportivo Huracán, and White Star.

== Honours ==
=== Regional ===
- Liga Departamental de Arequipa:

Winners (2): 1973, 1996
Runner-up (1): 1982

- Liga Provincial de Arequipa:

Winners (4): 1973, 1982, 1992, 1996

- Liga Distrital de Arequipa:

Winners (19): 1927, 1932, 1935, 1938, 1939, 1940, 1941, 1942, 1944, 1952, 1953, 1957, 1961, 1963, 1973, 1982, 1996, 2006, 2012
Runner-up (8): 1933, 1945, 1949, 1951, 1955, 1956, 1958, 1965

== See also ==
- List of football clubs in Peru
- Peruvian football league system
