= Oyotún District =

Coordinates: 6°50′S 79°18′W

Oyotún
- District
- Interactive map of Oyotún
- Country: Peru
- Region: Lambayeque
- Province: Chiclayo
- Founded: November 23, 1925
- Capital: Oyotún

Government
  - Mayor: Segundo Manuel Aguinaga Perez

Area
  - Total: 455.4 km^{2} (175.8 sq mi)
- Elevation: 209 m (686 ft)

Population (2005 census)
  - Total: 10,302
  - Density: 22.62/km^{2} (58.59/sq mi)
- Time zone: UTC-5 (PET)
- UBIGEO: 140110

Oyotún District is one of twenty districts of the province Chiclayo in Peru.

== Archaeology ==
In November 2019, Peruvian archaeologists led by Walter Alva discovered a 3,000-year-old, 130 feet long megalithic 'water cult' temple with 21 tombs in the Zana Valley. Archaeologists assumed that the temple was abandoned around 250 BC and later used as a burial ground by the Chumy people. Twenty of the tombs belonged to the people of Chumy, and one to an adult male buried during the Formative period with a ceramic bottle with two spouts and a bridge handle. According to the excavations, as many as three construction phases took place in the temple: the first was between 1500 BC-800 BC, when people built the foundations of the building from cone-shaped clay; second, between 800 BC-400 BC, when the megalithic temple was built under the influence of the pre-Inca civilization known as the Chavin; and finally 400 BC-100 BC, when people added circular pillars used to hold the roof of the temple.

== Climate ==
Climate data for Oyotún, elevation 187 m (614 ft), (1991−2020)
Month	Jan	Feb	Mar	Apr	May	Jun	Jul	Aug	Sep	Oct	Nov	Dec	Year
Mean daily maximum °C (°F)	31.6 (88.9)	31.6 (88.9)	31.5 (88.7)	31.1 (88.0)	29.9 (85.8)	28.1 (82.6)	27.4 (81.3)	27.3 (81.1)	28.1 (82.6)	28.6 (83.5)	29.6 (85.3)	30.9 (87.6)	29.6 (85.4)
Mean daily minimum °C (°F)	20.5 (68.9)	21.6 (70.9)	21.6 (70.9)	20.0 (68.0)	17.9 (64.2)	16.2 (61.2)	14.8 (58.6)	14.6 (58.3)	14.9 (58.8)	15.7 (60.3)	16.4 (61.5)	18.5 (65.3)	17.7 (63.9)
Average precipitation mm (inches)	39.3 (1.55)	86.7 (3.41)	109.3 (4.30)	36.3 (1.43)	7.2 (0.28)	2.9 (0.11)	1.5 (0.06)	0.7 (0.03)	4.2 (0.17)	6.3 (0.25)	7.2 (0.28)	14.1 (0.56)	315.7 (12.43)
Source: National Meteorology and Hydrology Service of Peru

Climate data for El Espinal, Oyotún, elevation 371 m (1,217 ft), (1991)
Month	Jan	Feb	Mar	Apr	May	Jun	Jul	Aug	Sep	Oct	Nov	Dec	Year
Mean daily maximum °C (°F)	30.1 (86.2)	29.9 (85.8)	30.0 (86.0)	29.4 (84.9)	28.5 (83.3)	27.6 (81.7)	27.5 (81.5)	27.4 (81.3)	27.9 (82.2)	28.2 (82.8)	28.6 (83.5)	29.6 (85.3)	28.7 (83.7)
Mean daily minimum °C (°F)	19.9 (67.8)	20.8 (69.4)	20.7 (69.3)	19.6 (67.3)	17.6 (63.7)	15.9 (60.6)	14.8 (58.6)	14.6 (58.3)	15.1 (59.2)	15.6 (60.1)	16.4 (61.5)	18.1 (64.6)	17.4 (63.4)
Average precipitation mm (inches)	34.6 (1.36)	93.5 (3.68)	120.8 (4.76)	59.8 (2.35)	17.3 (0.68)	5.1 (0.20)	3.4 (0.13)	2.2 (0.09)	7.2 (0.28)	13.0 (0.51)	11.7 (0.46)	17.7 (0.70)	386.3 (15.2)
Source: National Meteorology and Hydrology Service of Peru
