= Saña District =

Coordinates: 6.9043°S 79.5741°W

Saña Zaña
- District
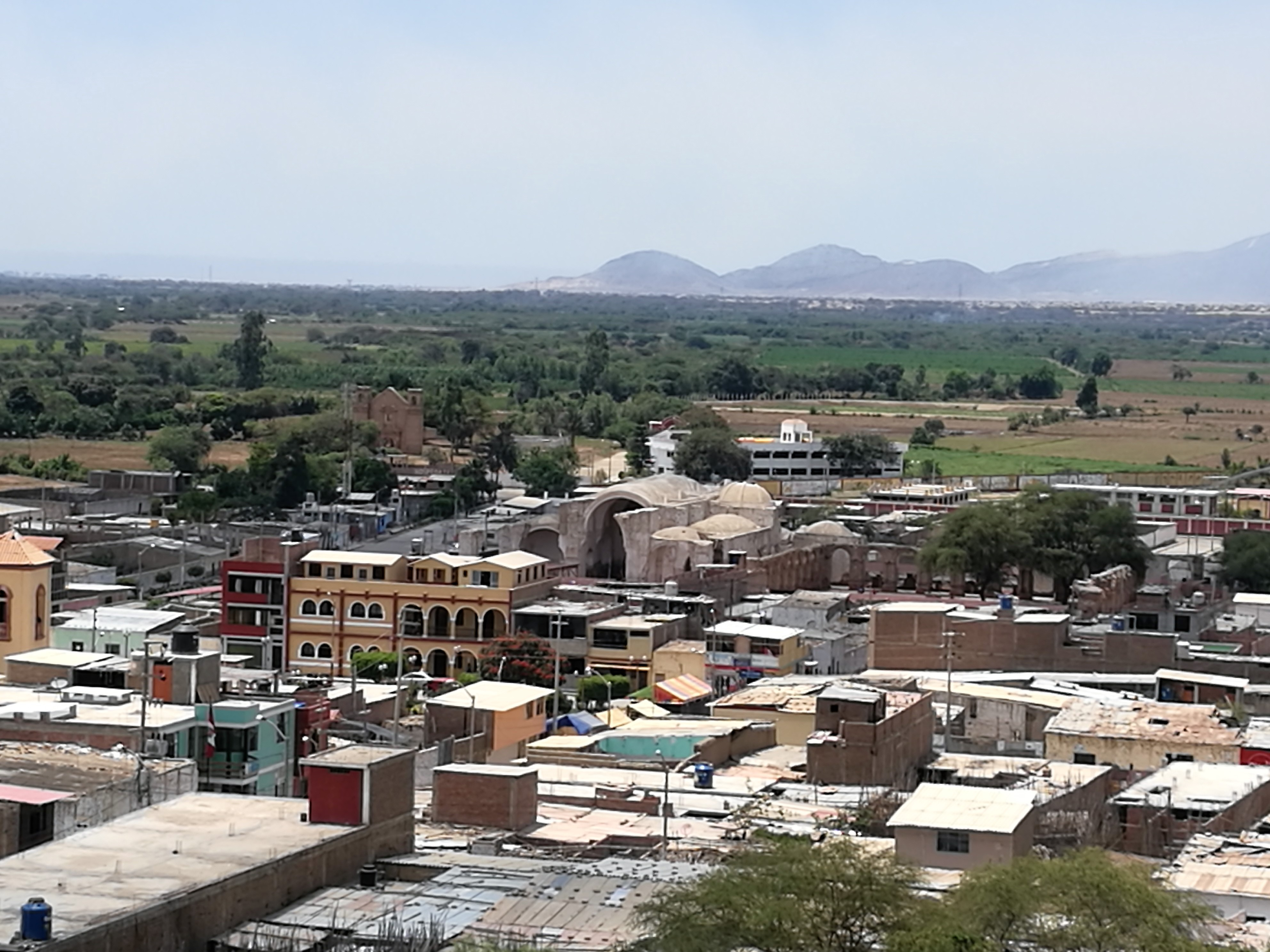
- the town of Zaña in the irrigated valley of the Zaña River.
- Interactive map of Saña
- Country: Peru
- Region: Lambayeque
- Province: Chiclayo
- Capital: Zaña

Government
  - Mayor: Luis Orlando Urbina Andonaire

Area
  - Total: 313.9 km^{2} (121.2 sq mi)
- Elevation: 46 m (151 ft)

Population (2017)
  - Total: 11,617
  - Density: 37.01/km^{2} (95.85/sq mi)
- Time zone: UTC-5 (PET)
- UBIGEO: 140115

Saña District, also Zaña District, is one of twenty districts of the province Chiclayo in Peru. The town of Zaña is the capital of the district.

== Climate ==
Climate data for Sipan, Saña, elevation 87 m (285 ft), (1991–2020)
Month	Jan	Feb	Mar	Apr	May	Jun	Jul	Aug	Sep	Oct	Nov	Dec	Year
Mean daily maximum °C (°F)	32.6 (90.7)	33.3 (91.9)	33.4 (92.1)	32.5 (90.5)	30.1 (86.2)	27.8 (82.0)	27.1 (80.8)	27.0 (80.6)	28.1 (82.6)	28.7 (83.7)	29.3 (84.7)	30.9 (87.6)	30.1 (86.1)
Mean daily minimum °C (°F)	20.4 (68.7)	21.8 (71.2)	21.5 (70.7)	20.0 (68.0)	18.1 (64.6)	16.5 (61.7)	15.3 (59.5)	14.9 (58.8)	15.3 (59.5)	15.9 (60.6)	16.4 (61.5)	18.5 (65.3)	17.9 (64.2)
Average precipitation mm (inches)	7.9 (0.31)	25.0 (0.98)	37.5 (1.48)	7.9 (0.31)	1.0 (0.04)	0.4 (0.02)	0.2 (0.01)	0.1 (0.00)	1.1 (0.04)	2.5 (0.10)	1.7 (0.07)	4.1 (0.16)	89.4 (3.52)
Source: National Meteorology and Hydrology Service of Peru
