= Nueva Arica District =

Coordinates: 6.8746°S 79.3421°W

Nueva Arica
- District
- Interactive map of Nueva Arica
- Country: Peru
- Region: Lambayeque
- Province: Chiclayo
- Founded: January 25, 1944
- Capital: Nueva Arica

Government
  - Mayor: José Teofilo Catedra Ramirez

Area
  - Total: 208.63 km^{2} (80.55 sq mi)
- Elevation: 205 m (673 ft)

Population (2005 census)
  - Total: 2,625
  - Density: 12.58/km^{2} (32.59/sq mi)
- Time zone: UTC-5 (PET)
- UBIGEO: 140109

Nueva Arica District is one of twenty districts of the province Chiclayo in Peru.
