= Pucalá District =

Coordinates: 6.7807°S 79.6143°W

Pucalá
- District
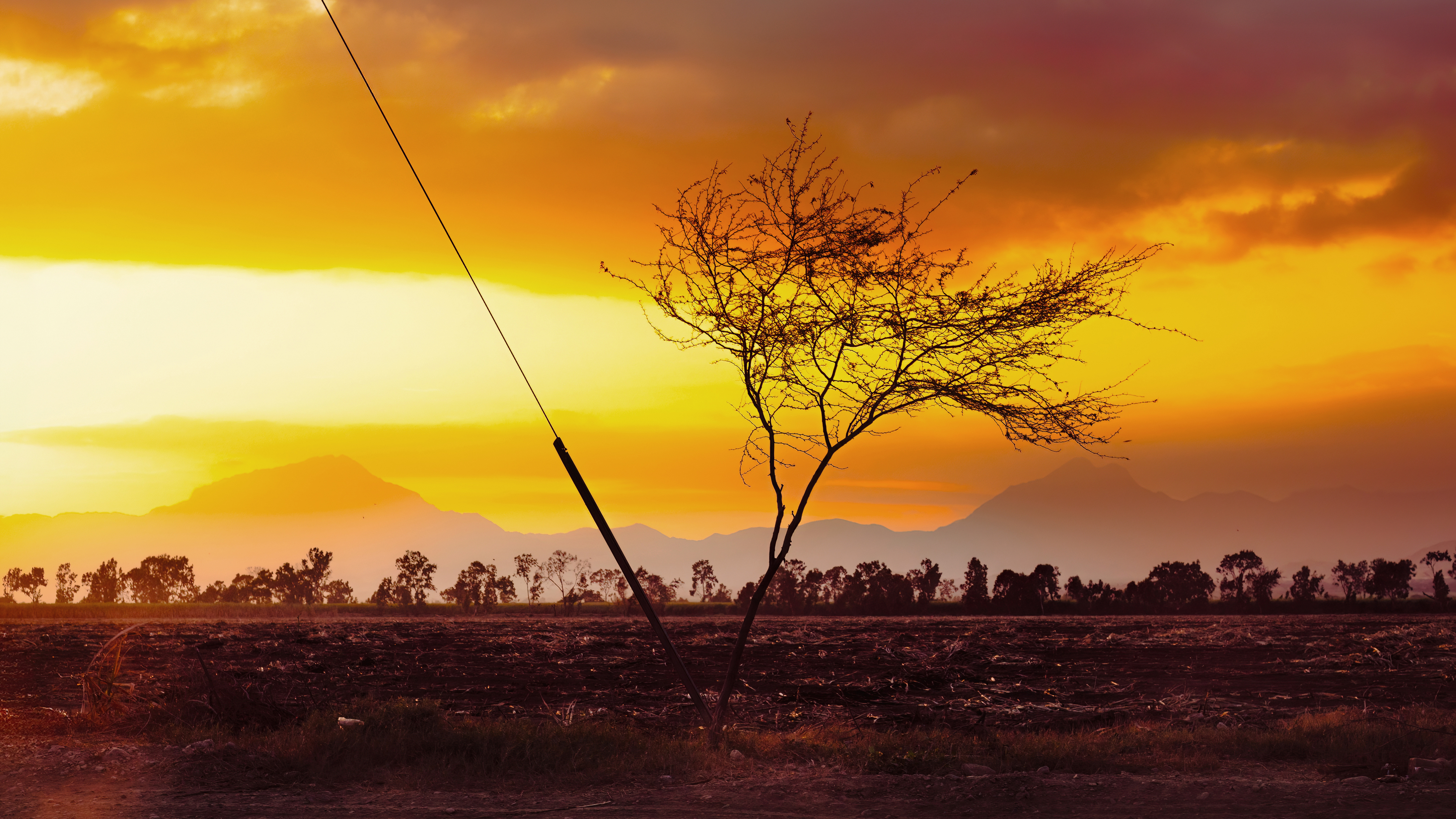
- Interactive map of Pucalá
- Country: Peru
- Region: Lambayeque
- Province: Chiclayo
- Founded: January 29, 1998
- Capital: Pucalá

Government
  - Mayor: Luis Alberto Gonzales Quintana

Area
  - Total: 175.81 km^{2} (67.88 sq mi)
- Elevation: 82 m (269 ft)

Population (2005 census)
  - Total: 10,113
  - Density: 57.522/km^{2} (148.98/sq mi)
- Time zone: UTC-5 (PET)
- UBIGEO: 140119

Pucalá District is one of twenty districts of the province Chiclayo in Peru.
