= Peruvian security crisis =

Increased criminality since 2021

- Part of the Peruvian political crisis (2016-present), spillover of the Colombian conflict and war on drugs (in Peru)
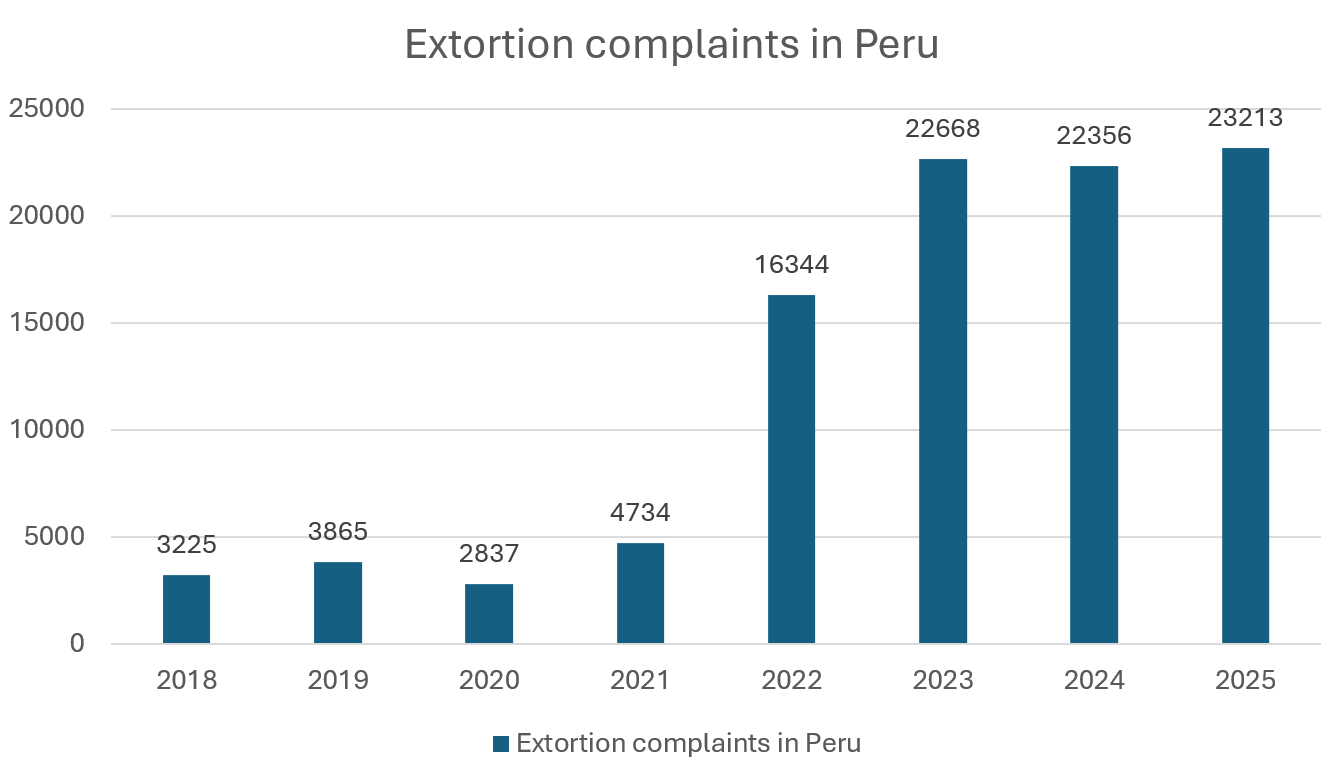
- Extortion complaints in Peru through October 2025
Date	2021 – present
Location	Peru
Result	State of emergency imposed in metro Lima (March 2025)

Belligerents
(Peru) Peruvian Government; Peruvian Armed Forces; Peruvian Army; Ministry of Interior; National Police	Organized crime; Tren de Aragua; Los Tiguerones; Militarized Communist Party of Peru; Comando Vermelho; Los Malditos de Bayovar; Illegal miners

Commanders and leaders
(Peru) Pedro Castillo (2021–2022) (Peru) Dina Boluarte (2022–2025) (Peru) José Jerí (2025–2026) (Peru) José María Balcázar (2026) (Peru) Keiko Fujimori (2026-present)	Various

Strength
130,000+	Unknown

Casualties and losses
Unknown	Unknown

The Peruvian security crisis is a period marked by a sustained increase of criminality, urban violence, transnational organized crime and a general perception of urban insecurity. The situation has affected several regions of the country, including Lima province, La Libertad, Piura, Loreto and Callao, and has affected diverse sectors such as mining, business, transport, music and education.

Between 2021 and 2025, indices of homicide, extortion, and violent crimes increased significantly. According to the Public Ministry of Peru, more than 22835 cases of extortion were reported in 2024, a 379.62% increase from 2021; and there was a doubling in homicides since before the pandemic. At the same time, criminal gangs, such as Tren de Aragua expanded their presence and operations in Peru.

== Events ==
Since 2021, there has been a steady increase in crime and drug trafficking rates, following the decrease in cases due to the COVID-19 pandemic. However, crime levels began to rise, and by 2022 the downward trend had reversed, with crime rates beginning to exceed pre-pandemic levels. It was reported that reported criminal acts increased by 18% in 2021 compared to 2020. The rise in crime prompted then-President Pedro Castillo to decree the deployment of the military to the streets of Lima and Callao in support of the police in November 2021. That month, cases of extortion against transport workers were reported, with drivers being forced to pay 5 soles daily. The following month, he announced a 20% increase in police personnel to strengthen public safety. In response to the extortion cases, Interior Minister Avelino Guillén announced that demanding protection money would be classified as a crime, "extortion terrorism".

In February 2022, Supreme Decree 012-2022-PCM declared a 45-day state of emergency in Lima and Callao to combat crime. Castillo announced the deployment of the military to combat common crime, asserting that the police had the capacity to fight it. However, Prime Minister Aníbal Torres declared that "the police have been vastly outmatched by crime." Furthermore, the executive branch sent a bill to Congress prohibiting two people from riding on a motorcycle. At that time, an increase in the number of extortion cases was reported nationwide, with Lima, Callao, and Trujillo being the areas where these crimes were most prevalent. In addition, the murder of transport workers and attacks on those who did not pay were reported, as well as the murder and extortion of sex workers.

In December 2024, it was reported that 19,432 cases of extortion was reported throughout Peru. Peruvian extortion rates have increased severely since 2017, with more than 2000 cases per month reported in 2025.

In March 2025, President Dina Boluarte declared a state of emergency in Lima and Callao, after the murder of singer Paul Flores.

In May 2025, 13 gold miners were killed in Pataz province, leading to the government imposing a temporary ban on mining in the region.
