= Armonía 10 =

Peruvian cumbia group

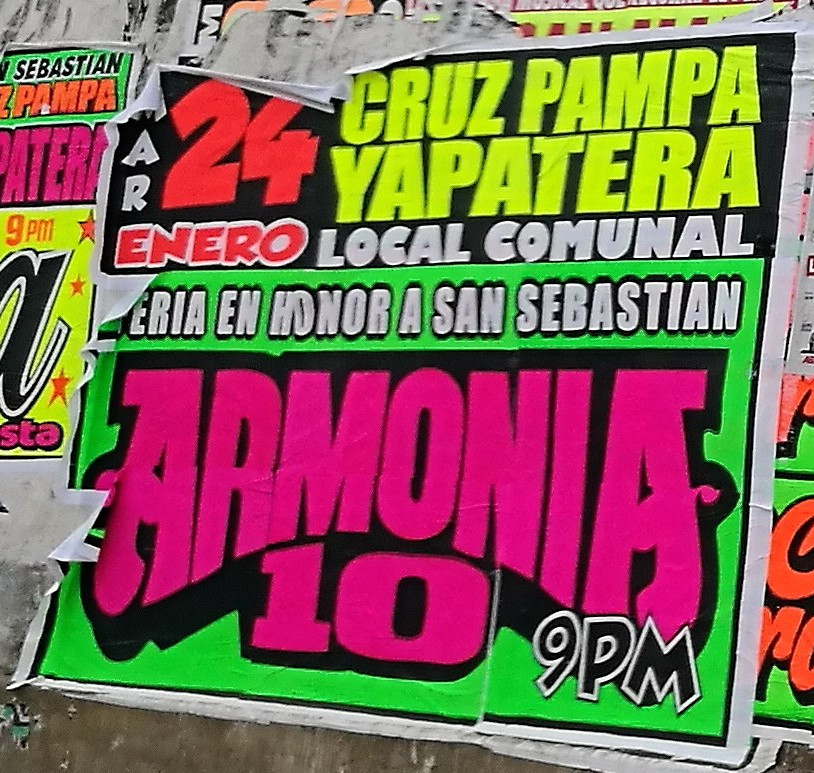
- Armonía 10 in promotional material for the San Sebastián festivities in Cruzpampa, Yapatera, Chulucanas, January 2017

Background information
- Origin: Piura, Peru
- Genres: Peruvian cumbia
- Years active: 1972–present
- Label: Infopesa

Armonía 10 is a Peruvian cumbia group formed on 27 May 1972 in Piura, Peru, by Juan de Dios Lozada Naquiche. Originally known by names including Golden Star and Los Blanders, the ensemble adopted the name Armonía 10 after its membership expanded to ten musicians.

Under the direction of Juan de Dios's son Walther Lozada Floriano, Armonía 10 became one of the best-known representatives of northern Peruvian cumbia and developed a reputation for introducing prominent singers into the genre. In 2022, the Peruvian Ministry of Culture designated Armonía 10 a Personalidad Meritoria de la Cultura in recognition of its contribution to the dissemination of cumbia as part of the country's musical culture.

== History ==
=== Formation and early recordings ===
Armonía 10 was founded in the San Martín neighborhood of Piura by Juan de Dios Lozada Naquiche on 27 May 1972. Walther Lozada, one of Juan de Dios's sons, gradually transitioned to the role of musical director and principal creative figure of the ensemble.

Early names of the group included Golden Star, followed by Los Blanders. Walther Lozada later recalled that the name Armonía 10 was adopted when the group had ten members. During its first years, the ensemble primarily performed at local events in and around Piura before expanding its audience across northern Peru.

In the early 1980's, record producer Alberto Maraví brought Armonía 10 to the Infopesa label, where the group made its first commercial recordings. The 1982 releases of "Enfermera", "Café con ron" and "Un cigarrillo, una guitarra y una pena". helped expand Armonía 10's audience beyond Piura, strengthening its presence throughout northern Peru and in parts of Ecuador.

In 1985, Armonía 10 recorded its first full-length album, El Chinchorro, for Infopesa. The album contained songs including "Ladrón de amor", "Solo estoy tomando", "Llorando se fue" and "El cervecero". Other recordings from this period included "Pagarás", "Dónde estás amor", "Gracias", "Cantinero de Piura" and "Por dinero o por amor".

The group's 1980s lineup included singers Alberto "Makuko" Gallardo, Percy Chapoñay, César Saavedra and Tony Rosado, among others. These successive vocalists contributed to the group's practice of featuring multiple lead singers with distinctive vocal styles rather than centering its identity on a single frontman.

=== 1990s and national prominence ===
Armonía 10 experienced financial difficulties at the beginning of the 1990s. Its 1991 album Pacto de amor was commercially unsuccessful, and Walther Lozada briefly considered dissolving the orchestra. The musicians persuaded him to continue, and in 1992 the group recorded A que volviste mujer. The album became successful in northern Peru and Lima and helped restore the group's commercial position.

The group continued to renew its roster of singers during the decade. Carlos Soraluz became one of its prominent voices, recording songs including "Siempre pierdo en el amor", "Herido corazón", "Solo" and "Juraré no amarte más". Tony Rosado left Armonía 10 in 1996 and subsequently established his own cumbia ensemble, Internacional Pacífico.

The 1998 album La Primerísima included recordings such as "Jugadora", "Herido corazón" and "Borracho por amor".

=== 2000s and 2010s ===
During the 2000s, Armonía 10 expanded its touring outside Peru while continuing to record new versions of its repertoire and new material. In 2005, RPP reported that the group was experimenting with elements of reggaeton alongside its established cumbia style.

The group released Renovación Total in 2007. During this period its repertoire included songs such as "Hasta las 6 de la mañana", "Me emborracho por tu amor", "Lágrima por lágrima", "Amor de estudiante" and "La duda".

The long succession of singers associated with Armonía 10 became a significant part of the group's identity. Walther Lozada stated that one of his strengths as director was identifying the appropriate vocal timbre for individual compositions, and former members frequently described the orchestra as a training ground for cumbia singers.

=== Death of Walther Lozada and ownership dispute ===
Walther Lozada died in Lima on 25 July 2022, aged 61, after suffering from liver disease while awaiting a transplant. His death occurred during Armonía 10's 50th-anniversary year, shortly after the group received its Personalidad Meritoria de la Cultura distinction.

Following his death, disagreements developed between members of the Lozada family over the management of the orchestra and the rights associated with the Armonía 10 name. Walther's widow and children subsequently established a separate project initially called Walther Lozada & Orquesta... el legado continúa, while Armonía 10 continued under the administration associated with Walther's brother Javier Lozada.

The disagreement later developed into legal proceedings involving ownership, corporate control and use of the registered Armonía 10 mark. The original mark Armonía 10 de Piura was registered to Consorcio Lozada & Asociados S.A.C., while Walther Lozada's heirs sought recognition of their inherited interest in the company and mark. As a result, by 2025 two similarly named ensembles were operating: the continuing Armonía 10 of Piura and the group associated with Walther's widow and children, commonly styled Armonía 10 de Walther Lozada.

=== Murder of Paul Flores and later activity ===
On 16 March 2025, Armonía 10 vocalist Paul Flores García, known as "Ruso", was killed when gunmen opened fire on the group's bus while it was travelling through Lima toward a performance in Santa Clara. The killing occurred amid a broader wave of extortion and violence targeting transport companies, musicians and entertainment businesses in Peru.

The group suspended performances during a period of mourning and announced its return later that month. Later in 2025, Armonía 10 held a large anniversary performance and released the album Cumbia Desde el Teatro, a 17-track collection of newly recorded versions of songs from its repertoire.

On 4 July 2026, the group staged Una Sola Armonía at the Parque de la Exposición in Lima. The concert reunited the contemporary lineup with former singers Carlos Soraluz, César "Chechi" Saavedra, Roberto Moreno, Marcos Yacila and Martín Pérez, as well as descendants of deceased former vocalists Makuko Gallardo and Percy Chapoñay.

== Musical style and legacy ==
Armonía 10 is associated primarily with northern Peruvian cumbia. Its arrangements have traditionally emphasized percussion, keyboards and brass instruments, with multiple lead singers sharing vocal duties. The group has also periodically incorporated influences from salsa, merengue and, during the 2000s, urban styles.

The group's reputation as a source of prominent cumbia singers has led to the nickname La Universidad de la Cumbia. Among the vocalists associated with Armonía 10 at different stages of its history are Makuko Gallardo, Percy Chapoñay, César Saavedra, Tony Rosado and Carlos Soraluz.

In its 2022 resolution granting the group the Personalidad Meritoria de la Cultura distinction, the Peruvian Ministry of Culture described Armonía 10 as one of the musical organizations with the greatest popular recognition in Peru and cited its role in disseminating cumbia as part of the country's musical tradition.

== Discography ==
=== Albums and major releases ===
- Enfermera (early recording, 1982)
- El Chinchorro (1985)
- Se quema, se quemó (1985)
- Tonto amor (1986)
- Gracias (1987)
- Pacto de amor (1991)
- A que volviste mujer (1992)
- La Primerísima (1998)
- Historia de Mi Vida (2001)
- Amargo y Dulce Amor (2001)
- Renovación Total (2007)
- La Nueva Era (2023)
- Cumbia Desde el Teatro (2025)

=== Compilations and live releases ===
- Armonía 10 en Vivo (2015)
- Primerísimos Éxitos (2017)
- Viejitos Pero Bonitos (2019)
- Edición de Lujo: Disco 1 (2019)

=== Selected singles and EPs ===
- "La duda" (2012)
- "Pendejerete (Cumbia)" (with Leslie Shaw) (2024)
- Parranda 9 – Una Sola Armonía (EP) (2026)
- "Parranda 10 – Una Sola Armonía" (2026)
- "Sidi Mansour – Una Sola Armonía" (2026)
