= Tumán District =

Coordinates: 6.7465°S 79.7185°W

Tuman
- District
- Interactive map of Tuman
- Country: Peru
- Region: Lambayeque
- Province: Chiclayo
- Founded: January 29, 1998
- Capital: Tuman

Government
  - Mayor: Juan Romero Zeña

Area
  - Total: 130.34 km^{2} (50.32 sq mi)
- Elevation: 99 m (325 ft)

Population (2005 census)
  - Total: 28,918
  - Density: 221.87/km^{2} (574.63/sq mi)
- Time zone: UTC-5 (PET)
- UBIGEO: 140120

Tuman District is one of twenty districts of the province Chiclayo in Peru.
