= Chiclayo province =

Coordinates: 6°45′50″S 79°50′15″W

Chiclayo Provincia de Chiclayo
- Province
- Chiclayo Province
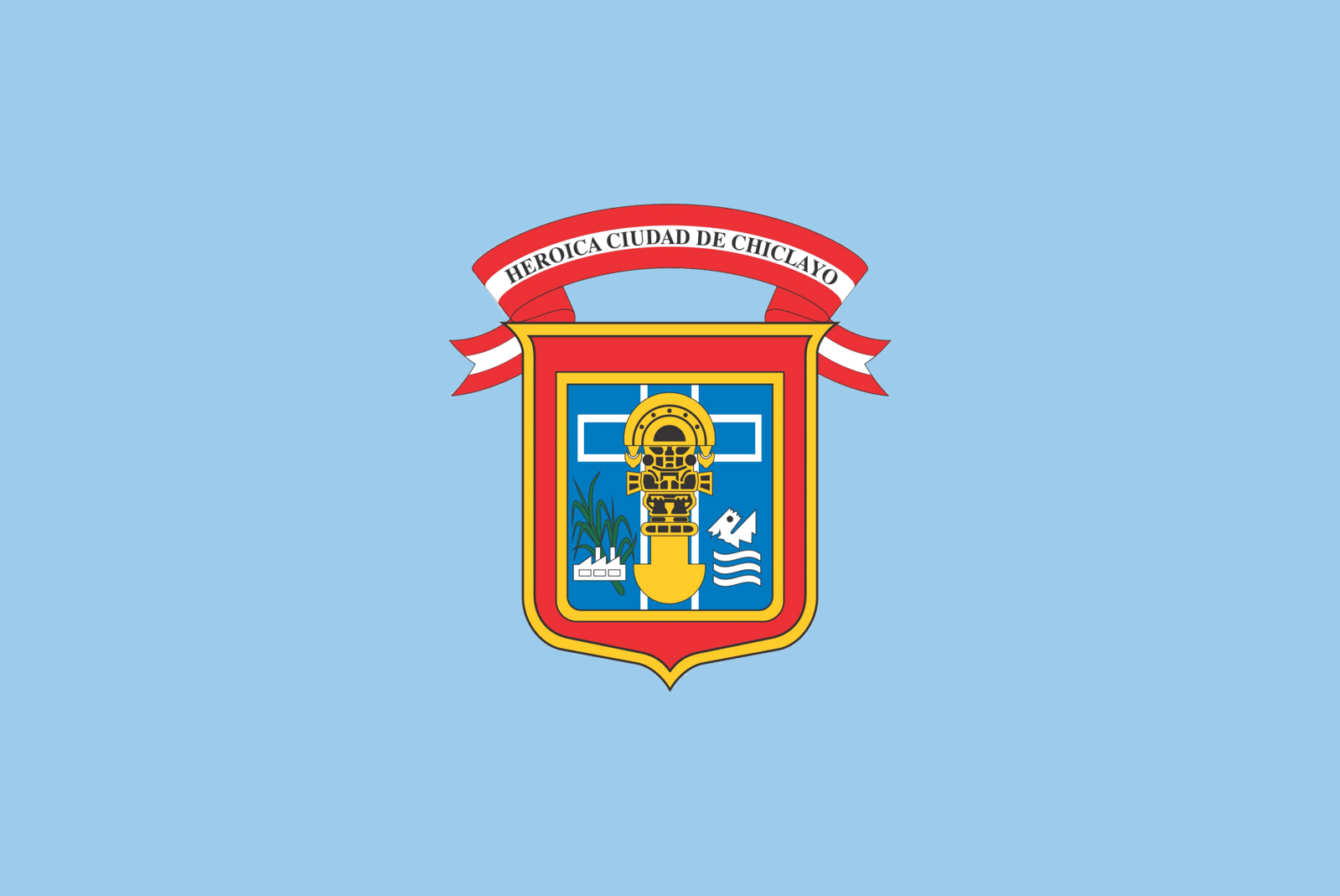
- Flag

- Location of Chiclayo in the Lambayeque Region
- Interactive map of Chiclayo
- Country: Peru
- Region: Lambayeque
- Founded: April 18, 1835 (nullified); March 22, 1839
- Founder: Felipe Santiago Salaverry (nullified); Agustín Gamarra
- Capital: Chiclayo

Government
  - Mayor: Janet Cubas Carranza (2023-2026)

Area
  - Total: 3,288.07 km^{2} (1,269.53 sq mi)

Population (2005 census)
  - Total: 738,057
  - Density: 224.465/km^{2} (581.362/sq mi)
- UBIGEO: 1401

Chiclayo Province is one of three provinces of the Lambayeque Region in Peru. The province was established on April 18, 1835 by President Felipe Salaverry, partitioning the southern region of Lambayeque Province. Following the fall and execution of Salaverry for his coup during the Peruvian Civil War of 1835-1836, the province's status was reverted back to Lambayeque. This lasted until a new decree issued by President Agustín Gamarra on March 22, 1839, which definitively confirmed the creation of the province. At the time, its jurisdiction also encompassed what are now the provinces of Pacasmayo and Chepén.

== Boundaries ==
- North: provinces of Lambayeque and Ferreñafe
- East: Cajamarca Region
- South: La Libertad Region
- West: Pacific Ocean

== Political division ==
The province is divided into twenty districts.

- Chiclayo
- Chongoyape
- Etén
- Etén Puerto
- José Leonardo Ortíz
- La Victoria
- Lagunas
- Monsefú
- Nueva Arica
- Oyotún
- Picsi
- Pimentel
- Reque
- Santa Rosa
- Saña
- Cayalti
- Patapo
- Pomalca
- Pucalá
- Tumán

== Population ==
The province has an estimated province of 729,433 inhabitants.

== Capital ==
The capital of this province is the city of Chiclayo, which is the fourth largest in Peru.

== Relief ==
The terrain of the province is mainly flat, with smooth slopes which rise from west to east. Here can be observed slight undulations and uneven elevations formed by continuous alluvial actions, both natural and man-made. The cultive lands have been object of an intense work of leveling to facilitate the irrigation.

== See also ==
- Lambayeque Region
- Administrative divisions of Peru
