= Chiclayo metropolitan area =

Chiclayo Metropolitan Area Área metropolitana de Chiclayo-Lambayeque
- Chiclayo-Lambayeque Metropolitan Area
- Interactive map of Chiclayo Metropolitan Area
- Country: Peru
- Region: Lambayeque
- Province: Chiclayo & Lambayeque
- Largest city: Chiclayo

Population (2007 Census)
  - Total: 697.871(year 2,007); 810.783(year 2,015)
- Time zone: UTC-5 (PET)

The Chiclayo Metropolitan Area is the name used to refer to the metropolitan area whose principal city is Chiclayo, according to Municipality of Chiclayo. According to population statistics of INEI It is the fourth most populous metropolitan area of Peru in year 2015.

== Population ==
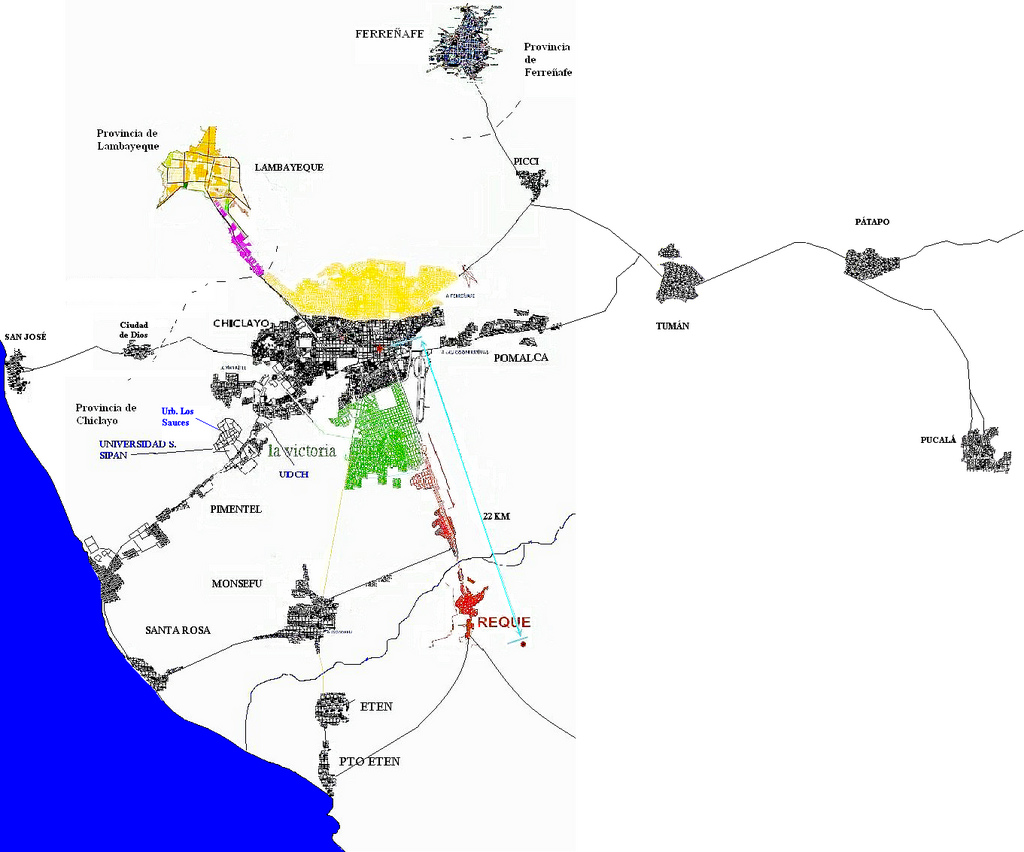
Map of Chiclayo metropolitan area

According to studies of municipality of Chiclayo the population of Chiclayo metropolitan in the year 2017 was of 697.871 people distributed in its metropolitan districts.

| Metropolitan Districts | Area km² | Elevation media msl* | Distance to Chiclayo (km) | Population Census 2017 |
|---|---|---|---|---|
| Chiclayo | 5.182,68 | 30 | 0 | 270.496 |
| Eten | 125,89 | 5 | 22 | 11.993 |
| Lambayeque | 190,5 | 20 | 10 | 71.425 |
| La Victoria | 2.646,42 | 25 | 3 | 90.912 |
| Leonardo Ortiz | 5.730,58 | 50 | 4 | 156.498 |
| Monsefú | 14,82 | 11 | 18 | 32.225 |
| Pimentel | 486,19 | 4 | 20 | 44.602 |
| Pomalca | 287,39 | 55 | 6 | 25.267 |
| Puerto Eten | 154,56 | 3 | 25 | 2.342 |
| Reque | 268,04 | 22 | 10 | 15.744 |
| Santa Rosa | 778,21 | 4 | 20 | 12.350 |
| San José | 315,52 | 4 | 20 | 15.846 |
| Total | - | – | – | 738.585 |

== Graphics of evolution of the population ==
In the following Graphics the evolution of the population of Chiclayo metropolitan area.

Graphics of the evolution of the population of Chiclayo metropolitan area between 1981 y 2014

Fuentes:
Population 1981, 1993, 2007, 2017

== See also ==
- Chiclayo Province
- List of metropolitan areas of Peru
- Peru
