= Chiclayo =

Chiclayo Santa María de los Valles de Chiclayo
- City
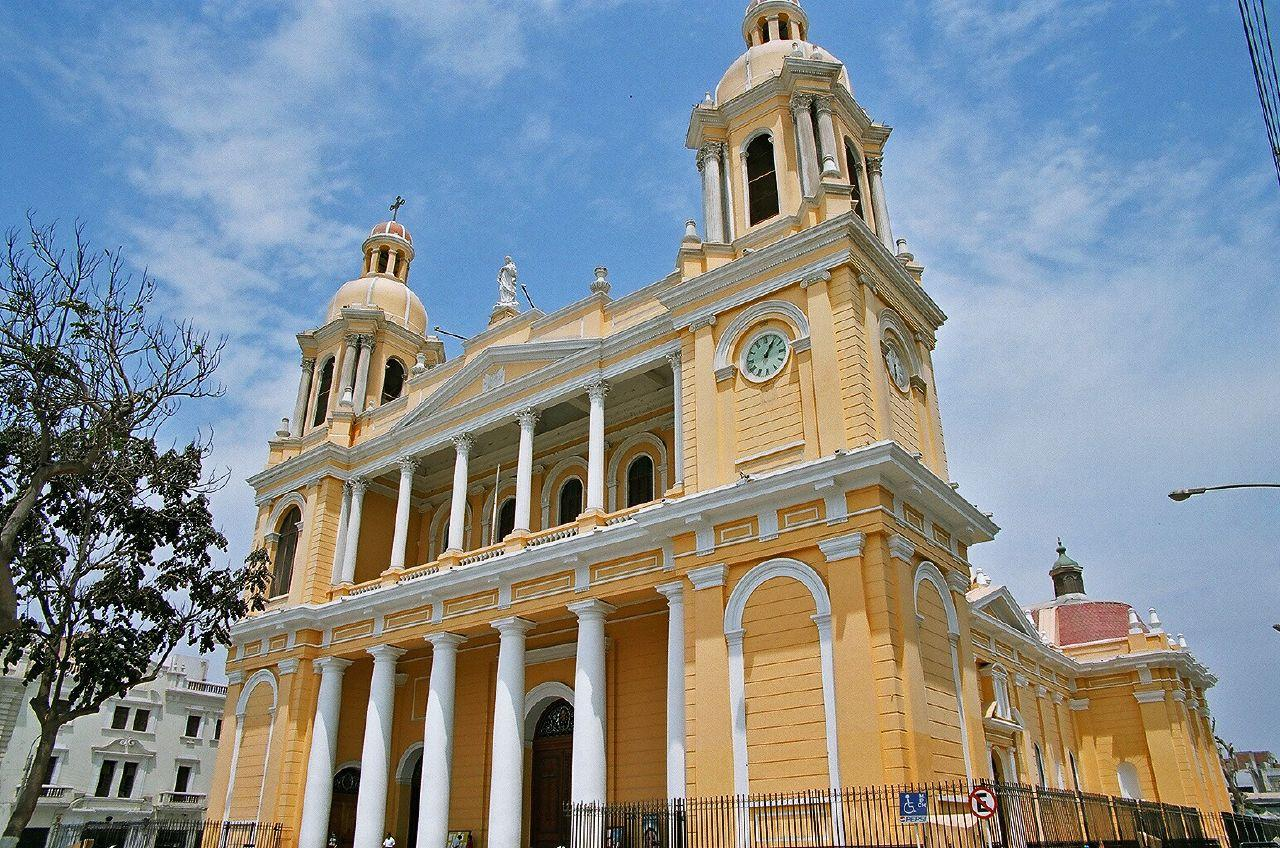
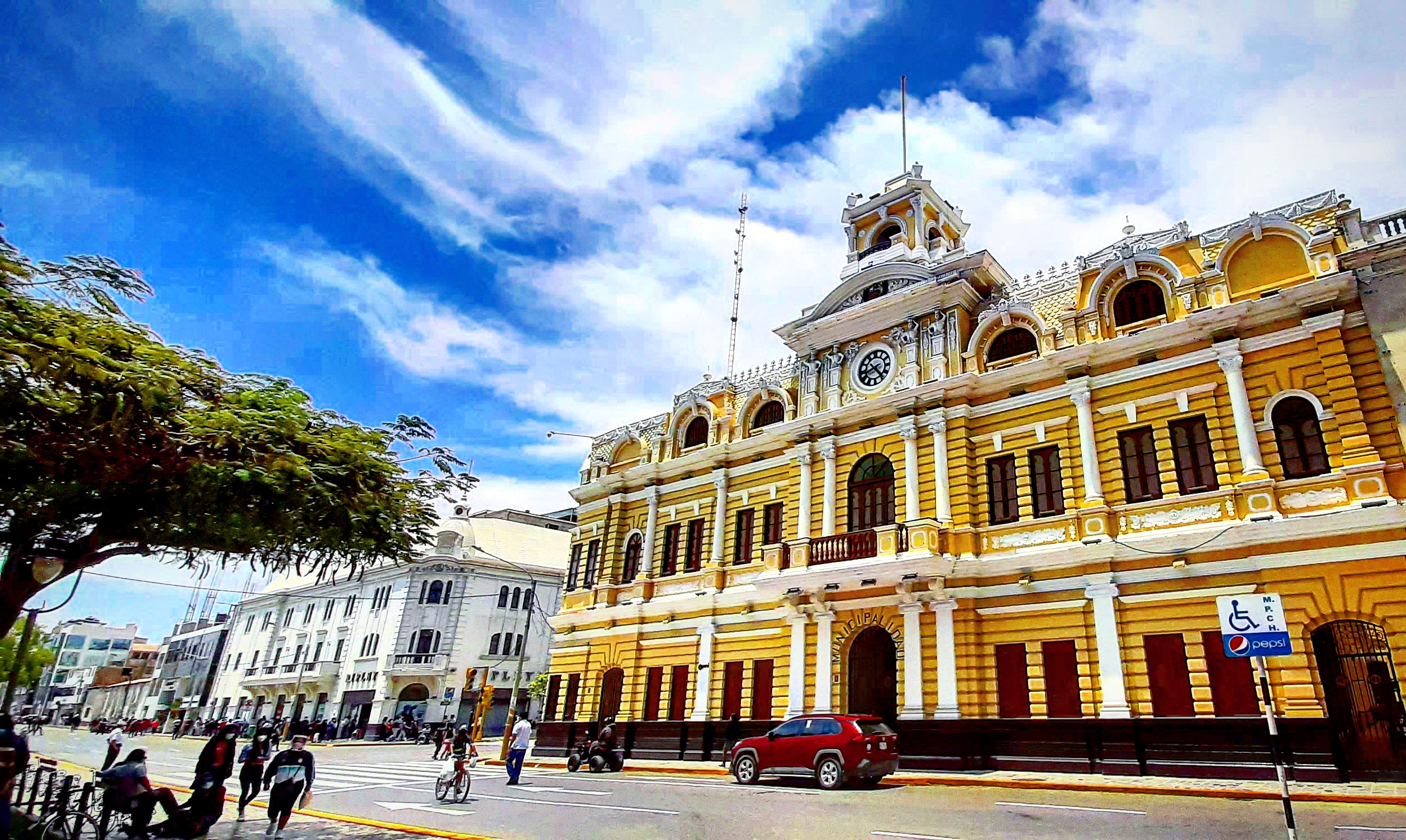
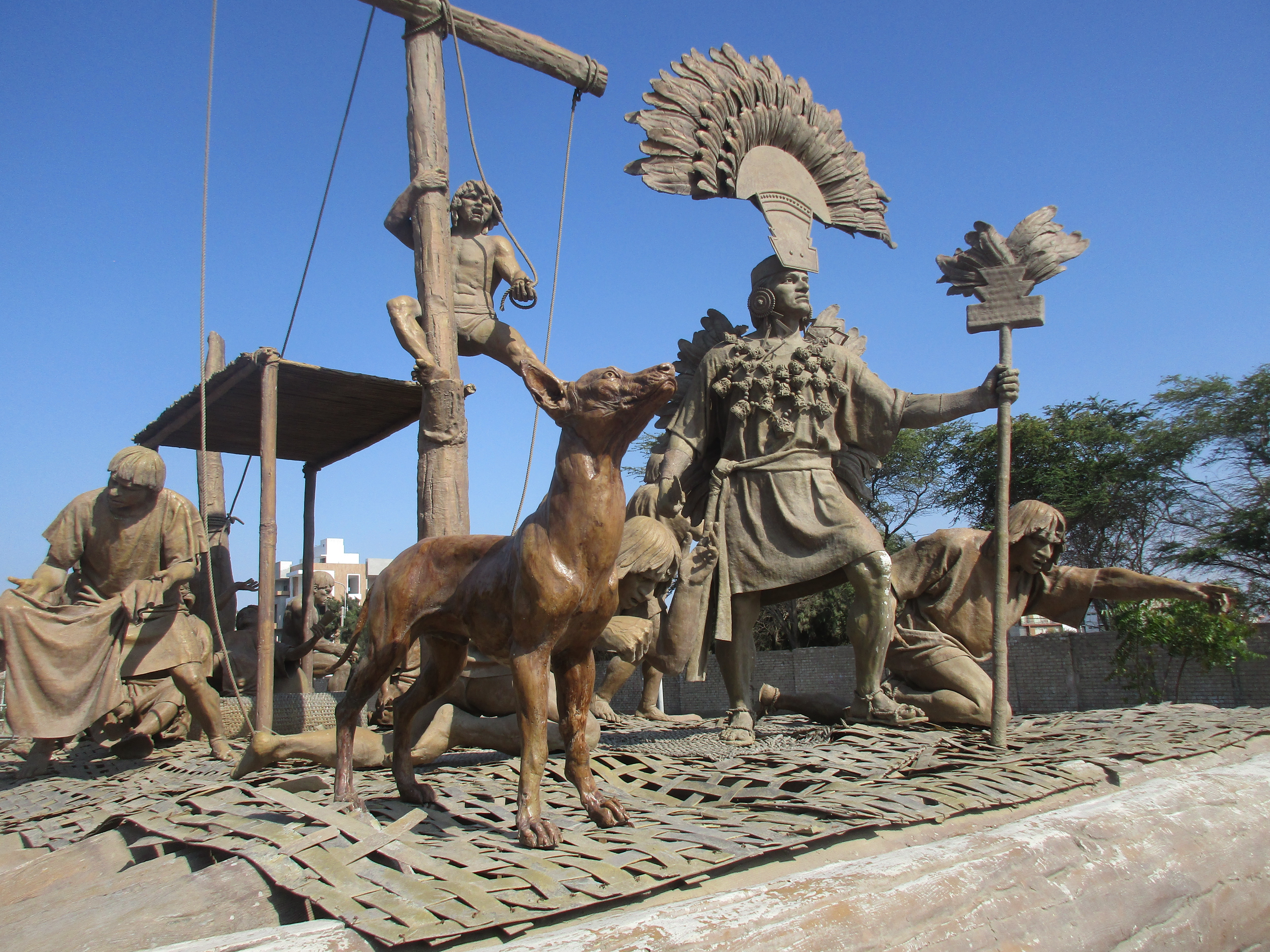
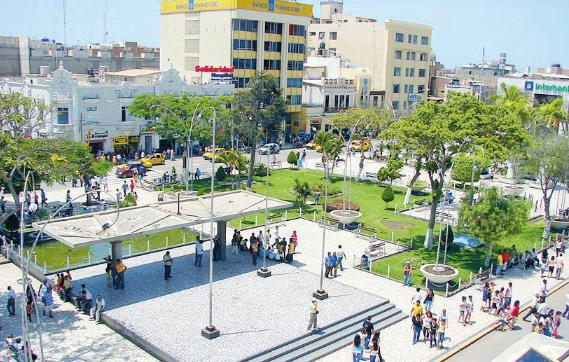
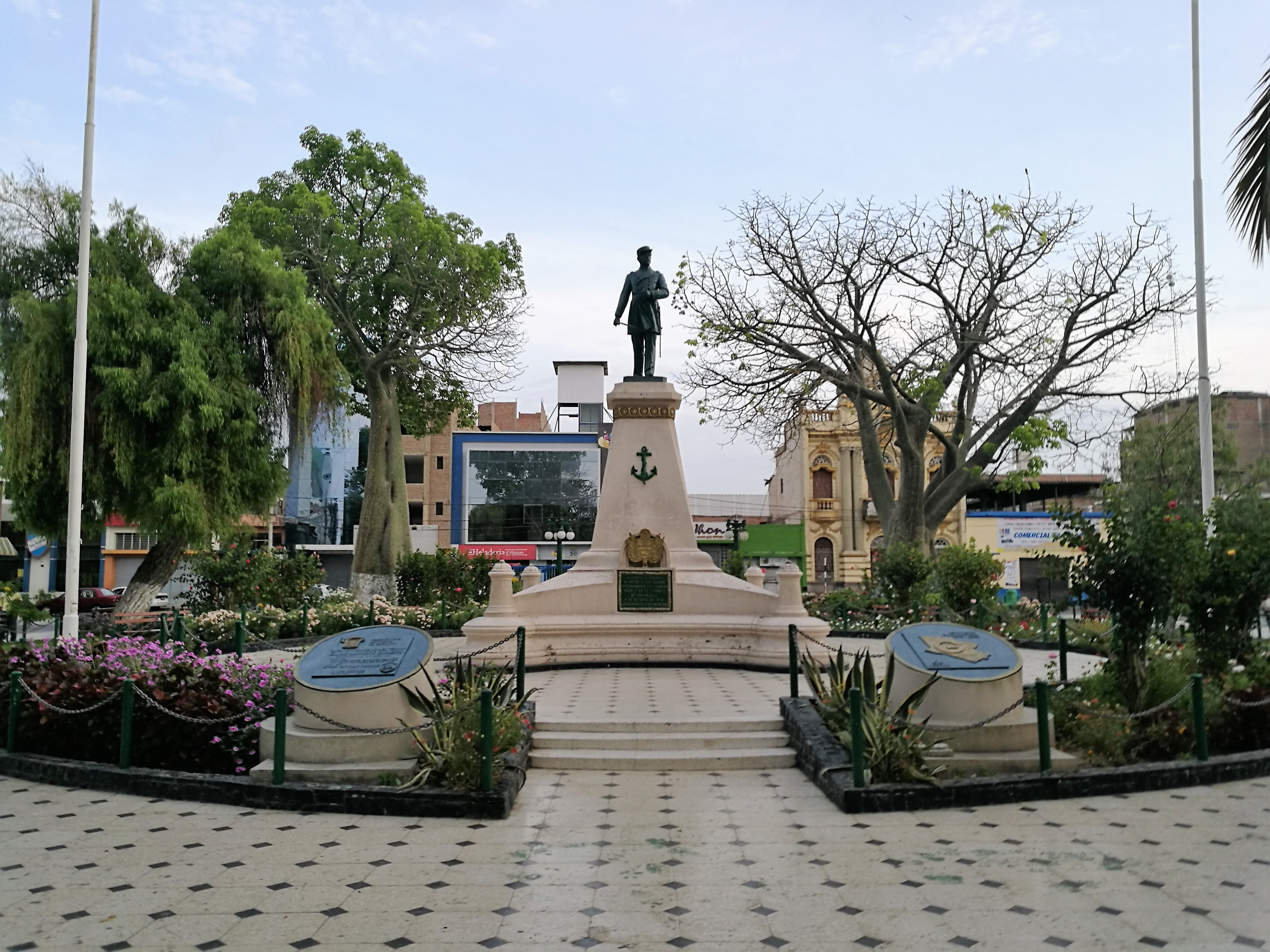
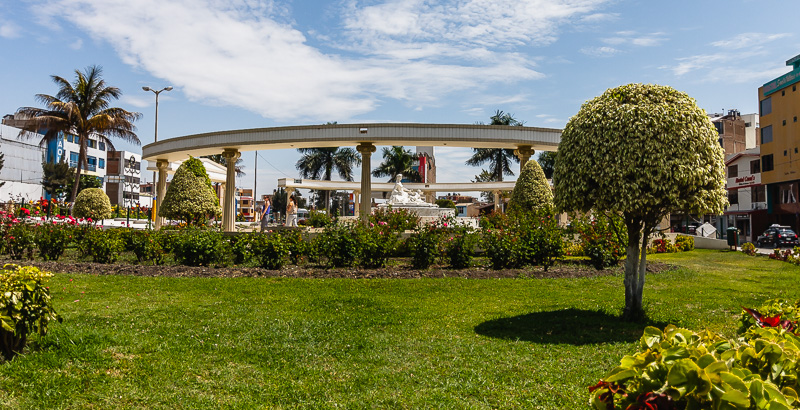
- Santa María Cathedral Municipal Palace Paseo Yortuque Plaza de Armas Statue dedicated to Elías Aguirre Paseo de Las Musas

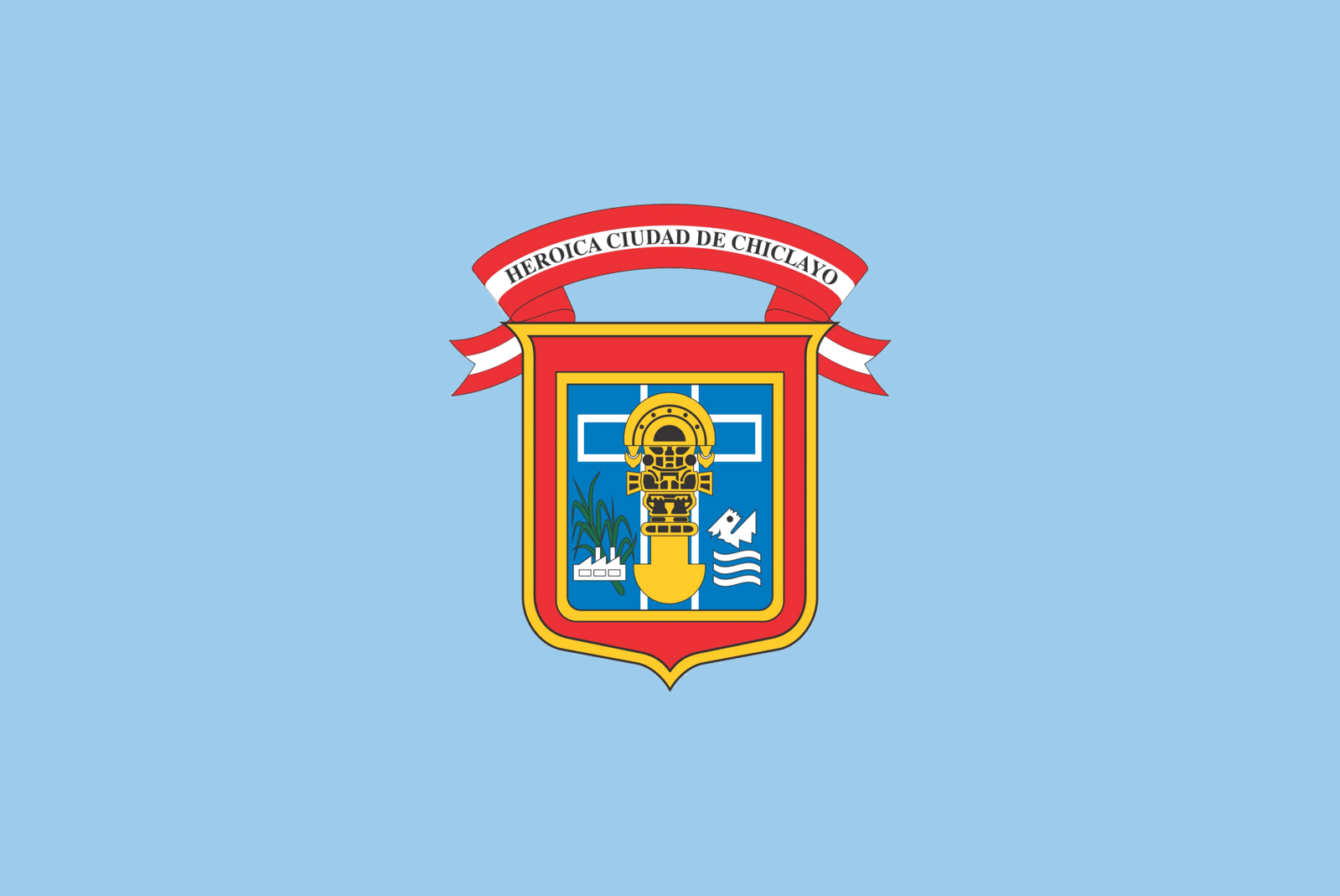
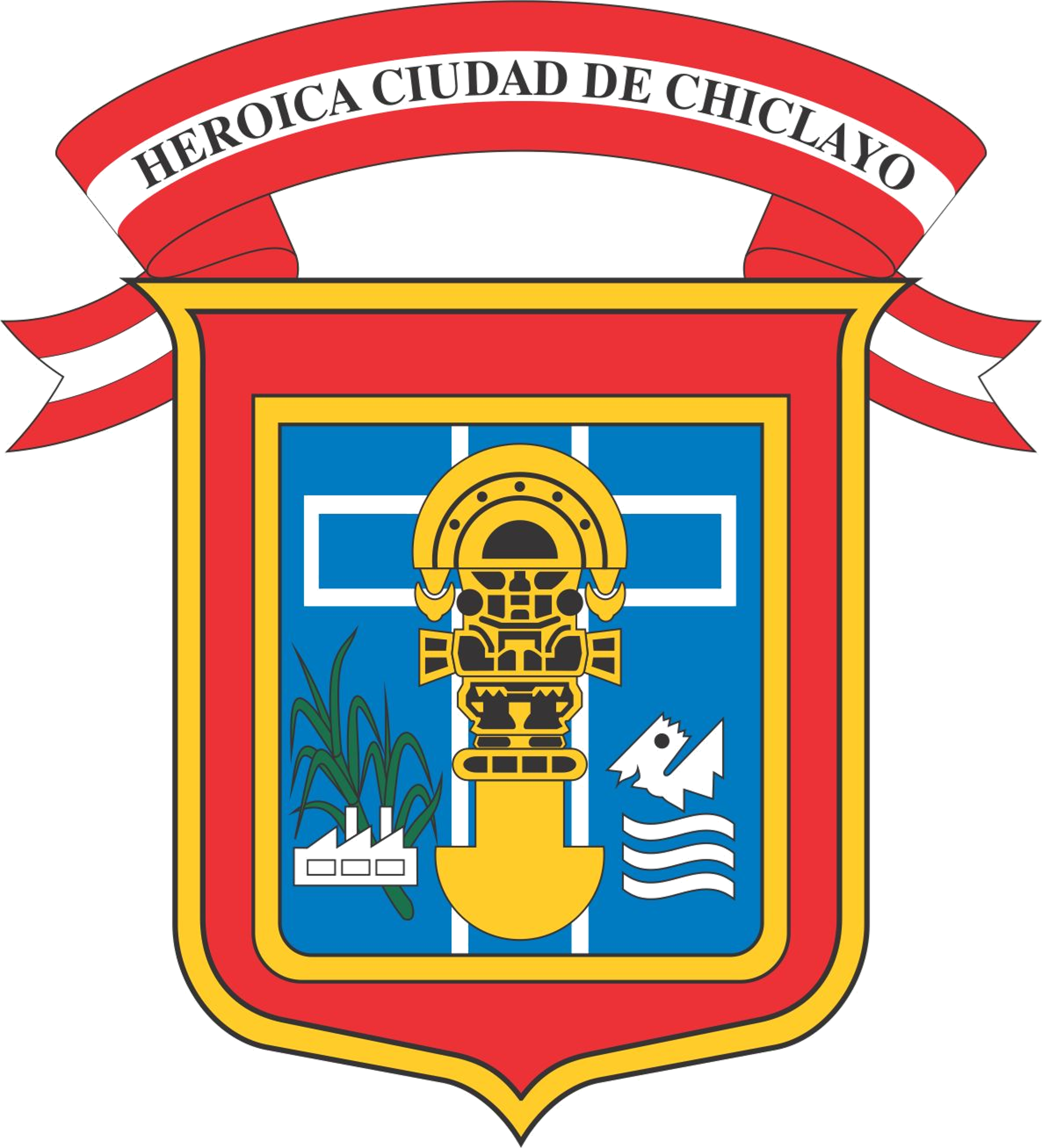
- Flag Seal
- Nickname: La Ciudad de la Amistad (City of Friendship)
- Interactive map of Chiclayo
- Location in Peru Location within South America Location within Earth
- Coordinates: 06°46′18″S 79°50′18″W
- Country: Peru
- Region: Lambayeque
- Province: Chiclayo
- District: Chiclayo
- First settled as an Indian reduction: c. 16th century
- Independence: 31 December 1820
- Declared as a town: 12 November 1827
- Declared as a city: 18 April 1835
- Declared as the department capital: 1 December 1874
- Founder: Spanish Franciscans

Government
  - Type: Mayor–council government
  - Mayor: Janet Cubas Carranza (2023–2026)

Area
  - City: 174.46 km^{2} (67.36 sq mi)
- Elevation: 27 m (89 ft)

Population (2022)
  - City: 609,400
  - Estimate (2015): 600,440
  - Rank: 4th
  - Urban density: 5,192/km^{2} (13,450/sq mi)
  - Metro: 812,548
- Demonym: chiclayano/a
- Time zone: UTC-5 (PET)
- UBIGEO: 14000-14013
- Area code: 74
- Website: www.gobiernochiclayo.gob.pe

Chiclayo (Spanish pronunciation: [tʃiˈklaʝo]; Mochica: Cɥiclaiæp) is the principal city and capital of the Lambayeque region and Chiclayo Province in northern Peru. It is located 13 km (8.1 mi) from the Pacific coast, 208 km (129 mi) from the city of Trujillo, and 770 km (480 mi) from the country's capital, Lima.

The city was originally founded by Spanish Franciscan priests as "Santa María de los Valles de Chiclayo" in the 16th century, acting as a small town of passage and rest of travelers. It was declared an official city on 15 April 1835 by president Felipe Santiago Salaverry. He named Chiclayo "the Heroic City" to recognize the courage of its citizens in the fight for independence, a title it still holds. Other nicknames for Chiclayo include "The Capital of Friendship" and the "Pearl of the North", due to its kind and friendly nature of its people.

Chiclayo is Peru's fourth-largest city, after Lima, Arequipa, and Trujillo, with a population of 738,000 as of 2011. The Lambayeque region is the fourth most populous metropolitan area of Peru, with a population of 972,713 in 2009. The city is divided into three urban districts, Chiclayo, La Victoria, and José Leonardo Ortiz. The Chiclayo metropolitan area comprises 12 districts. It is the second most populous city in Northwestern Peru, after its city rival, Trujillo. The city was founded near an important prehistoric archaeological site, the Northern Wari ruins, which constitute the remains of a city from the 7th to 12th century of the Wari Empire. The city was also once part of the Moche culture, which dominated Northern Peru 100 to 700 AD. The Lord of Sipán was the ruler of the Moche and the Sipán mummies are the most popular tourist attraction of city of Lambayeque and Chiclayo, with most tourists arriving from Chiclayo. The Royal Tombs of Sipán Museum in Lambayeque houses thousands of Moche artifacts.

== Etymology and toponymy ==
The record of the name already appears documented as a toponym in the descriptive grammar of the Mochica language, entitled "Arte de la lengua yunga" [en: Art of the Yunga Language] (1644), prepared by the parish vicar of Reque, Fernando de la Carrera Daza, in the mid-17th, written there in the orthography developed by the author as "Cɥiclaiæp", where it is mentioned three times. First, in a prologue listing the towns and localities where Mochica language was still spoken. This spelling reflects how the toponym was pronounced in Mochica in the region during the colonial period of the Viceroyalty; however, the reconstruction of the exact sounds represented by Carrera's orthography remains a matter of debate among specialists, including the digraph ⟨cɥ⟩ and the vowel represented by ⟨æ⟩. For example, José Antonio Salas reconstructs *[tʲiklajɘ͡ʊp], and Rita Eloranta reconstructs *[ciklajɨp].

Many different historical accounts tell of the naming of Chiclayo. Some attribute it to an indigenous man known as "chiclayoc" or "chiclayep" who transported plaster between the ancient cities of Zaña, Lambayeque and Morrope.

Another version claims that around the time that the city was founded, the area was home to a green-colored fruit called chiclayep or chiclayop, which in the Mochican language means "green that hangs". In some towns in the highlands of Cajamarca, squashes are known as chiclayos, evidence that this fruit is the origin of the city's name.

Another source indicates that the word is a translation from the extinct Moche language and is derived from the word Cheqta which means "half" and yoc which means "property of".

Others say the Mochican language had words similar to the name, such as Chiclayap or Chekliayok, which means "place where there are green branches".

== Symbols ==
=== Shield ===
The coat of arms summarizes important features of the province, such as the one dedicated to the Virgin of the Immaculate Conception, represented in light blue background, which is a Catholic town, represented on the cross, but, also see other items related to the history, geography and landscape.

==== Description ====
- 'Tumi' the tumi is a ceremonial knife used by the Lambayeque culture, represents Naylamp.
- 'Sea' the sea was always very important for its marine resources and legends that are told of it.
- 'Huerequeque' is the typical bird of the region, is so called because in his song seems to say Huere-que-que-que.

== History ==
=== Pre-Columbian cultures ===
==== Mochica culture ====
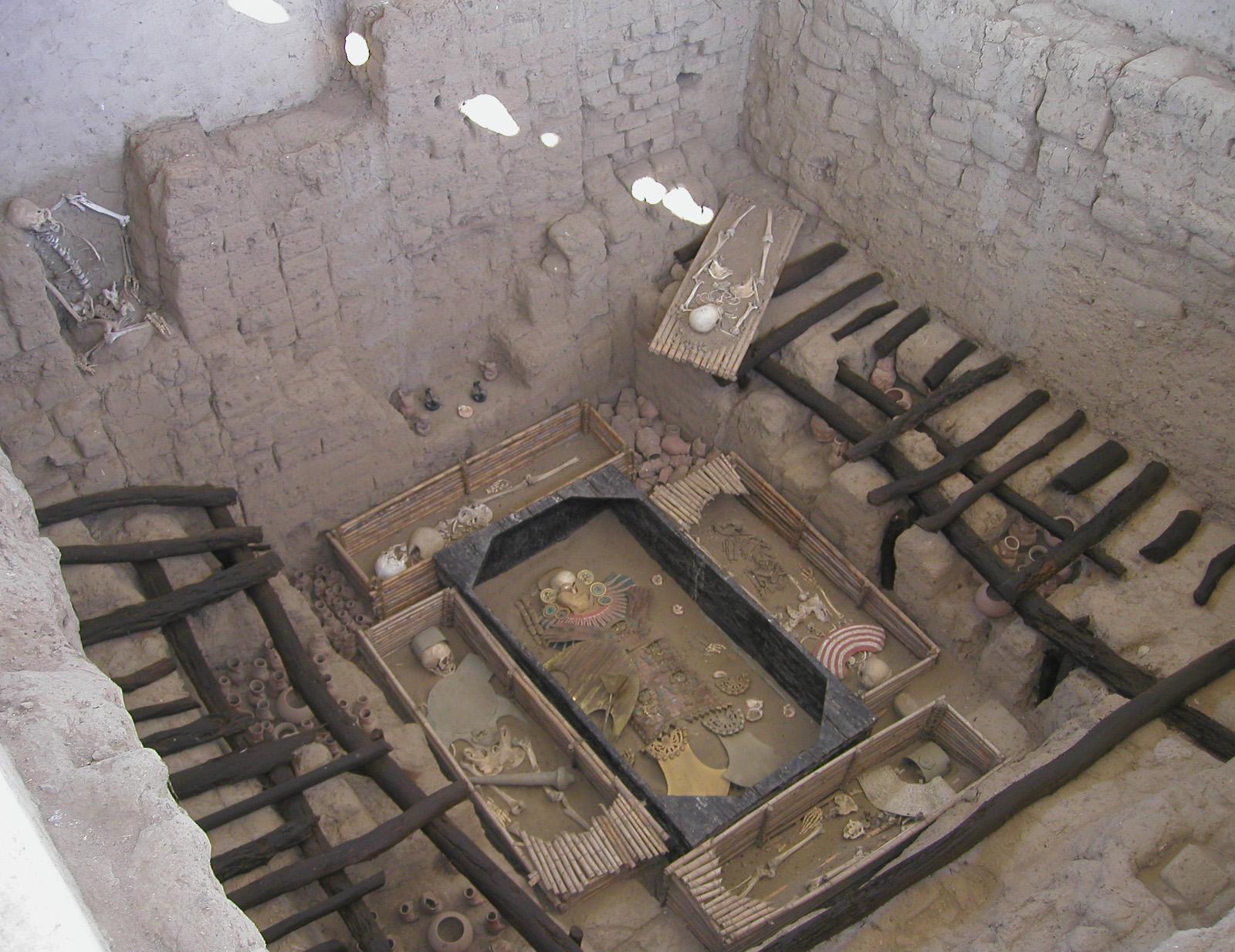
The Lord of Sipán tomb

The Moche civilization began between the 1st and 7th centuries AD, occupying a territory that spanned much of what is now the northern coast of Peru, encompassing what is today the coastal area of the departments of Ancash, Lambayeque and La Libertad. This civilization developed a broad knowledge of hydraulic engineering: its people constructed canals to create an irrigation system in order to support agriculture. They produced surpluses, which supported population density and a strong economy for development. The culture was characterized by intensive use of copper in the manufacture of ornamental objects, tools and weapons. The Moche civilization was one of the largest and most influential in Peru, and ruins and archeological sites of the Moche, especially the Lord of Sipán, became large tourist destinations.

During the Moche times, Pampa Grande, near Chiclayo, was a major regional capital.

The Mochicans produced ceramics with elaborate designs, representing religious themes, humans, animals, and scenes of ceremonies and myths reflecting their perception of the world. They were famous for huaco-portraits, which are preserved in museums around the country, highlighting amazing expressiveness, perfection, and realism. The civilization disappeared as a result of disasters caused by El Niño.

==== Sican culture ====
The Sican culture (or Lambayeque culture) existed between 700 and 1375AD and occupied the territory that is now the department of Lambayeque, including present-day Chiclayo.

This culture formed towards the end of the Moche civilization and assimilated much of the Moche knowledge and cultural traditions. At its peak, (900–1100), it extended over almost the entire Peruvian coast. The Sican excelled in architecture, jewelry and navigation. A thirty-year drought around the year 1020 hastened the fall of this civilization, along with multiple El Niño disasters.

Soon after, the territories of the Sican Culture were controlled by the Chimu Empire, which would absorb the goldsmithing techniques of the Sicán in the handling of gold and silver, integrating its population into this kingdom. Finally, the Chimu would be conquered by the Inca Pachacutec, in the Inca expansion to the north, integrating the region into the Chinchaysuyo of the Inca empire until the Spanish conquest by Francisco Pizarro.

=== Colonial period ===
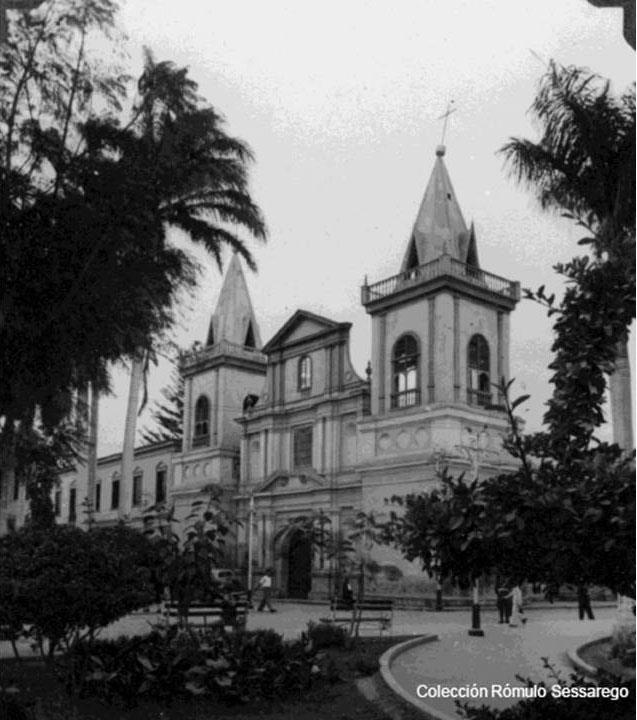
Iglesia Matriz during the 20th century

In the early 16th century, Chiclayo was inhabited by two ethnic groups; the Cinto and Collique. The chieftains of these ethnic groups donated part of their land for the construction of a Franciscan convent. This section of land was approved by the royal decree of 17 September 1585. Thus, with the advocation of Saint Maria of Chiclayo and under the direction of Father Fray Antonio of the Concepción, a church and a Franciscan convent were erected at Chiclayo. At the time of construction of these Spanish-built edifices, the city of Chiclayo was founded. Unlike other major Peruvian colonial cities such as Lima, Piura, Trujillo, or Arequipa, Chiclayo was inhabited by a largely indigenous population rather than Spanish colonizers.

During his expedition, Francisco Pizarro passed through the region of Chiclayo, on his last expedition on his way to Cajamarca, reaching Zaña. At this place the road forked in two, one to the south and the other to Cajamarca, taking the latter to meet Incan emperor, Atahualpa, despite the fact that some members of the expedition to Peru suggested that he continue south to what is now Arequipa.

The town was part of the Intendancy of Trujillo that came to have nine districts that were Trujillo, Lambayeque, Piura, Cajamarca, Huamachuco, Chota, Moyobamba, Chachapoyas, Jaén and Maynas, the latter party previously made up the departments of what is now known as (Department of San Martín, Ucayali, Loreto) being the Intendancy of Trujillo the largest in the Viceroyalty of Peru, that is, almost all of the north of present-day Peru; its first intendant was Fernando Saavedra from 1784 to 1791. He was followed by Vicente Gil de Taboada (1791–1805 and 1810–1820), Felice del Risco y Torres (provisional) (1805–1810) and the Marquis of Torre Tagle (1820), who led the independence of the Intendancy.

==== War of Independence ====
During the Peruvian War of Independence, Chiclayo supported General José de San Martín's liberating army with soldiers, weapons, horses, and other resources, under the supervision of the most progressive creole, José Leonardo Ortiz, and Juan Manuel Iturregui, Pascual Saco Oliveros and other Lambayecan patriots.

=== Republican era ===
After independence, Chiclayo was still a small village. On 15 April 1835, Chiclayo was proclaimed a city by then-president Felipe Santiago Salaverry, who declared it a "Heroic City" in recognition of the services its people rendered in the War of Independence. The next day, the Chiclayo Province was organized, with Chiclayo designated as its capital and then, capital of the Department of Lambayeque. In 1827, Chiclayo was elevated to the level of villa.

Chiclayo's progress began primarily during the Republican era, when it was granted the title of city, naming it "Heroic City" in recognition of the services rendered by the people of Chiclayo to the independence cause.

=== Modern Chiclayo ===
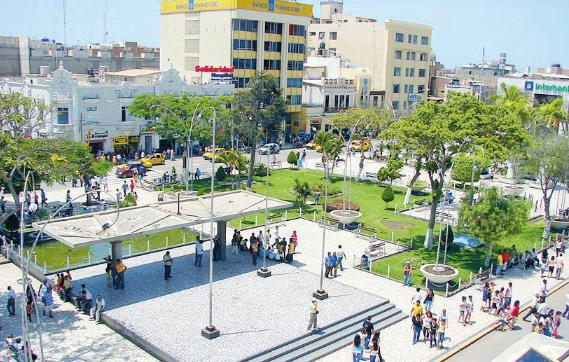
Parque Central of Chiclayo

In the 21st century, Chiclayo is one of the financial and commercial capitals of Northern Peru, along with neighboring cities Piura and Trujillo. Its strategic geographic location makes it a rail, communications, and automotive hub. Modern touches include large supermarkets, banking chains, warehouses, hospitals, clinics, and galleries. It has also been a popular tourist destination for its beautiful beaches, architecture and historic sites. The project, Tren de la Costa, is planned to connect the cities of Sullana, Lima, and Ica, including Chiclayo as a station. Chiclayo is also known as the "Ciudad de la Amistad" ("City of Friendship") and Perla del Norte ("Pearl of the North") of Peru, for the kindness of its people.

On 8 May 2025, former Bishop of Chiclayo Robert Francis Prevost was chosen as Pope Leo XIV. Born in the United States, he served as bishop from 2015 to 2023, and has been a naturalized Peruvian citizen since 2015.

== Geography ==
=== Location ===
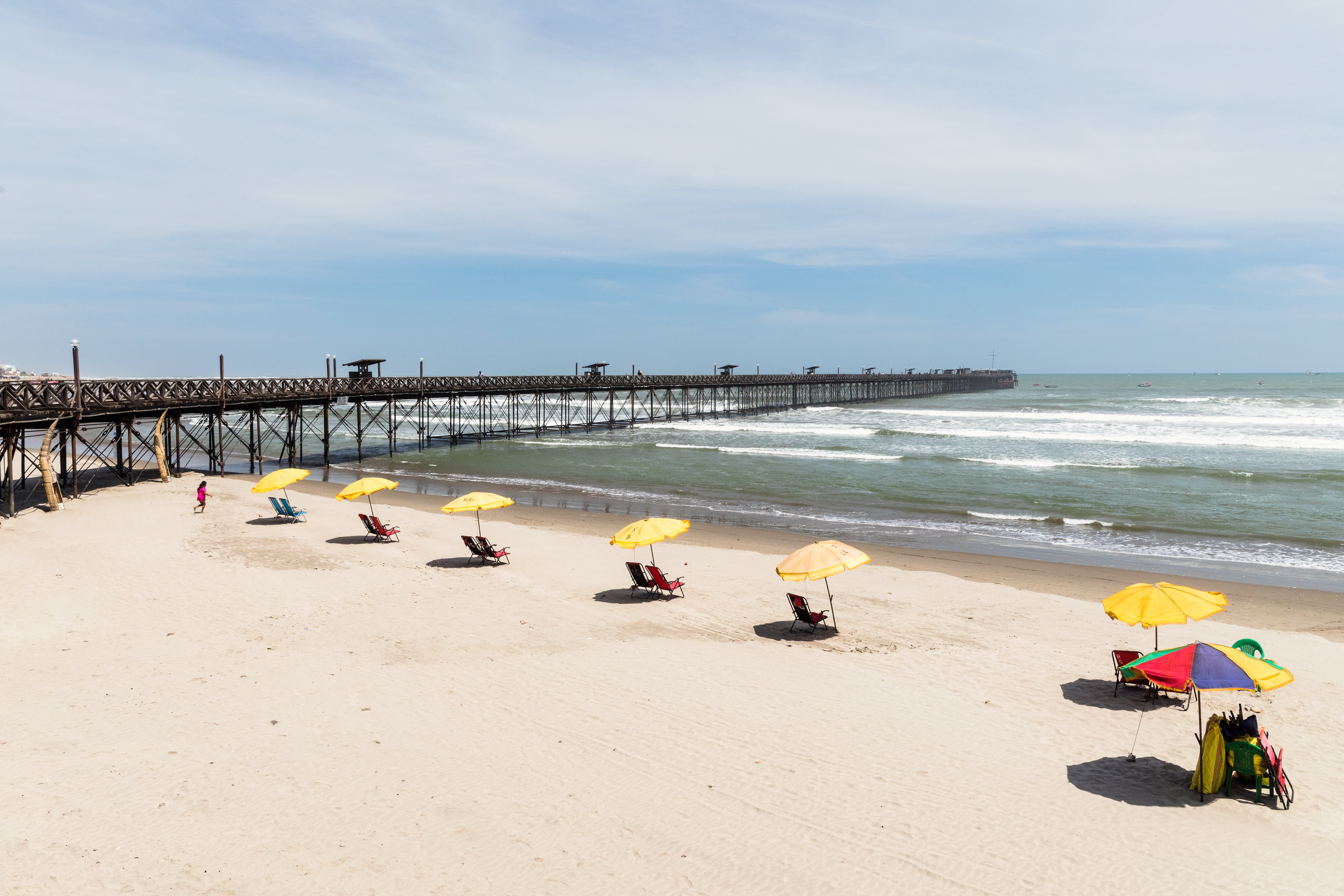
Pimentel beach

Chiclayo is located 13 km (8.1 mi) from the Pacific Ocean, 208 km (129 mi) from the city of Trujillo and 770 km (480 mi) from the capital and largest city of Peru, Lima. It is located at an altitude of 27 m (89 ft) above sea level. Much like Trujillo, Chiclayo has great surfing conditions, with Pimentel being the city's most popular beach.

=== Climate ===
Chiclayo has a warm and very dry desert climate with the sun shining all year around. Since the city of Chiclayo is located in a tropical zone near the Equator, the weather should be hot, humid, and rainy. However, it mostly resembles a subtropical climate, being comfortable and dry. This is due to the strong winds called "cyclones" that lower temperature to a moderate climate for most of the year except in the summer months where the temperature rises, so summer is often spent in nearby resorts like Puerto Eten and Pimentel. In the summer months (December to May) the temperature is hot from 27 °C to 30 °C during the day and between 19 °C to 21 °C at night, reaching peaks of 31 °C to 33 °C during the day and between 22 °C to 23 °C at night between February and March, which makes it different from the rest of the central coast of Peru since it has a longer (6 months) and hotter summer with muggy tropical nights and making beach days more pleasant by counteracting the daytime heat the cold water typical of the Peruvian sea. The winter from July to September, therefore, is much cooler and milder than the central coast of the country, with more sunny days and higher daytime temperatures between 21 °C to 24 °C and windy but less humid nights, with almost the complete absence of the typical drizzle or garúa of Trujillo, Chimbote or Lima. Periodically, every 7, 10 or 15 years, there are high temperatures during the summer that can exceed 35 °C due to the El Niño phenomenon, registering regular rains and extreme increase in river water. During the El Niño phenomenon of 1998, in the month of February, 100 mm of rain per day were recorded, caused by the most powerful storms ever recorded in this city.

Climate data for Chiclayo (1991–2020 normals, extremes 1943–present)
Month	Jan	Feb	Mar	Apr	May	Jun	Jul	Aug	Sep	Oct	Nov	Dec	Year
Record high °C (°F)	36.2 (97.2)	38.0 (100.4)	36.0 (96.8)	39.2 (102.6)	34.9 (94.8)	34.7 (94.5)	35.4 (95.7)	31.4 (88.5)	30.5 (86.9)	31.9 (89.4)	32.2 (90.0)	34.0 (93.2)	39.2 (102.6)
Mean daily maximum °C (°F)	30.0 (86.0)	31.4 (88.5)	31.2 (88.2)	29.5 (85.1)	27.3 (81.1)	25.3 (77.5)	24.5 (76.1)	24.0 (75.2)	24.4 (75.9)	24.9 (76.8)	25.8 (78.4)	27.8 (82.0)	27.2 (80.9)
Daily mean °C (°F)	24.3 (75.7)	25.5 (77.9)	25.4 (77.7)	23.7 (74.7)	21.9 (71.4)	20.6 (69.1)	19.4 (66.9)	19.0 (66.2)	19.1 (66.4)	19.5 (67.1)	20.6 (69.1)	22.1 (71.8)	21.8 (71.2)
Mean daily minimum °C (°F)	20.7 (69.3)	22.0 (71.6)	21.8 (71.2)	19.8 (67.6)	18.5 (65.3)	17.5 (63.5)	16.6 (61.9)	16.2 (61.2)	16.1 (61.0)	16.3 (61.3)	17.1 (62.8)	18.7 (65.7)	18.4 (65.2)
Record low °C (°F)	15.0 (59.0)	16.0 (60.8)	10.5 (50.9)	12.8 (55.0)	11.0 (51.8)	12.8 (55.0)	12.0 (53.6)	11.0 (51.8)	12.0 (53.6)	12.0 (53.6)	10.0 (50.0)	10.0 (50.0)	10.0 (50.0)
Average precipitation mm (inches)	5.9 (0.23)	2.4 (0.09)	8.8 (0.35)	4.0 (0.16)	1.3 (0.05)	0.4 (0.02)	0.0 (0.0)	0.3 (0.01)	0.6 (0.02)	0.8 (0.03)	1.9 (0.07)	0.5 (0.02)	26.9 (1.06)
Average precipitation days (≥ 1.0 mm)	1.2	1.3	3.6	1.9	0.7	0.3	0.0	0.2	0.2	0.4	0.3	0.6	10.6
Average relative humidity (%)	73	72	74	75	76	78	79	80	79	79	78	76	77
Mean monthly sunshine hours	192.2	188.1	195.3	201.0	201.5	168.0	161.2	167.4	189.0	182.9	198.0	195.3	2,239.9
Mean daily sunshine hours	6.2	6.6	6.3	6.7	6.5	5.6	5.2	5.4	6.3	5.9	6.6	6.3	6.1
Source 1: NOAA (precipitation 1961–1990), Meteo Climat (record highs and lows)
Source 2: Deutscher Wetterdienst (precipitation days 1970–1990 and humidity 1954–1969)FAO (sun 1971–2000)

== Government ==
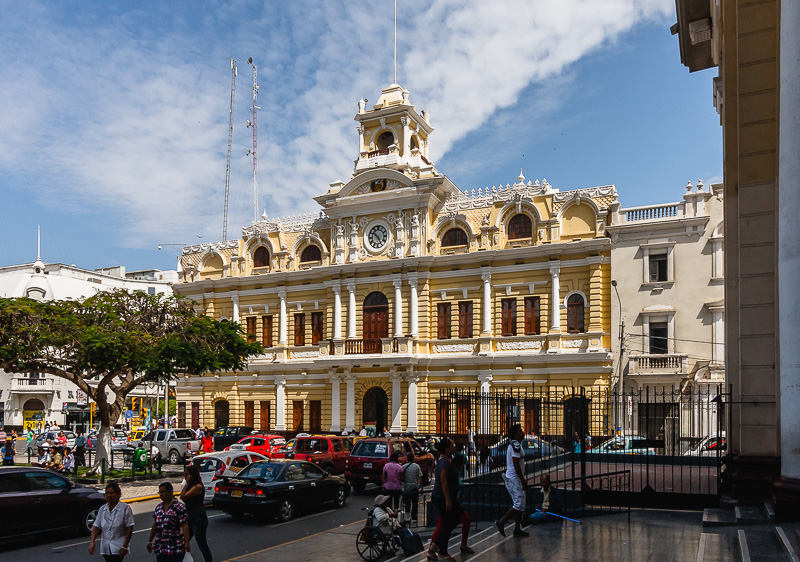
Municipal Palace of Chiclayo

In Chiclayo, the mayor is the head of government. The mayor is democratically elected for a period of four years. Each district also has a mayor, under the supervision of the mayor of Chiclayo. They are responsible for coordinating government administrative action in their district. the current mayor of Chiclayo is Janet Cubas Carranza, who was elected in 2023 and replaced Marco Gasco Arrobas.

Recent mayors of Chiclayo
Period	Mayor	Political party
1993–1995	Arturo Castillo Chirinos	AP-FREDEMO
1996–1998	Miguel Angel Bartra Grosso	AP-FREDEMO
1999–2002	Miguel Angel Bartra Grosso	Adelante Chiclayo
2003–2006	Arturo Castillo Chirinos	AP-FREDEMO
2007–2011	Roberto Torres Gonzáles	Todos por Lambayeque-Manos Limpias
2011–2015	Roberto Torres Gonzáles	Movimiento Regional de las Manos Limpias
2015–2018	David Cornejo Chinguel	Alianza para el progreso
2019–2022	Marco Gasco Arrobas	Podemos Perú

=== Districts ===
Central Chiclayo comprises three districts: Chiclayo, José Leonardo Ortiz, and La Victoria. Peripheral to the central city are three other districts: Pimentel, Pomalca, and Reque. Districts are subdivided into housing developments. The total land mass is 252.39 km^{2}.

Adding Pimentel, Pomalca, and Reque to the City of Chiclayo was proposed by a 1992 urban development plan called "Chiclayo 2020". The program was superseded in 2016 by the Plan de Acondicionamiento Territorial (PAT) and Plan de Desarrollo Urbano (PDU).

=== Metropolitan area ===
Chiclayo is part of the metropolitan area of Chiclayo-Lambayeque. The metropolitan area comprises the six districts of Chiclayo listed above, and six others: Lambayeque, Santa Rosa, Puerto Eten, Eten City, Monsefú, and Reque. Sixty percent of the metropolitan area's population is concentrated in the six districts of Chiclayo. The metropolitan area comprises central Chiclayo and adjacent areas, including the provincial capital of Lambayeque, some of which serve as bedroom communities and supply goods to Chiclayo.

== Demographics ==
According to the Census of Population and Housing undertaken in 2007, 574,408 people inhabit the area within Chiclayo's city limits or the six municipalities. The metropolitan area has a population of 930,824; it includes other nearby cities like Monsefú and Lambayeque in a ten-minute radius by paved highway. Under the thirty-minute range are, in order of hierarchy, Ferreñafe, Santa Rosa, Eten, Illimo and Tuman. Chiclayo is at the center of the Chancay River delta, in a fertile valley. The city is the fourth largest in Peru, after Lima, Arequipa, and Trujillo.

Municipalities of the city	Area km^{2}	Population (census 2007)	Households (2007)	Density (hab/km^{2})	Elevation masl	Distance from main square (km)
Chiclayo center	50.35	260,948*	60,325	5,182.7	27	0 km
José Leonardo Ortiz	28.22	167,717*	34,641	5,943.2	28	1.5 km
La Victoria	29.36	77,699*	16,447	2,646.4	23	2.4 km
Pomalca	80.35	23,092*	5,802	287.39	29	7 km
Reque	47.03	12,606*	3,664	268.04	21	8 km
Pimentel	66.53	32,346*	9,301	486.2	4	11.9 km
Total	301.84 km^{2}	574,408*	130,180	1,903.02	—	—
*Data from the census taken by the INEI

According to the planning director of Chiclayo, by 2020 the San Jose district belonging to the Lambayeque Province will be completely integrated with the city of Chiclayo. The district has a population 12,156 inhabitants. Most of the district is conurbanized with the rest of Chiclayo.

== Education and culture ==
=== University education ===
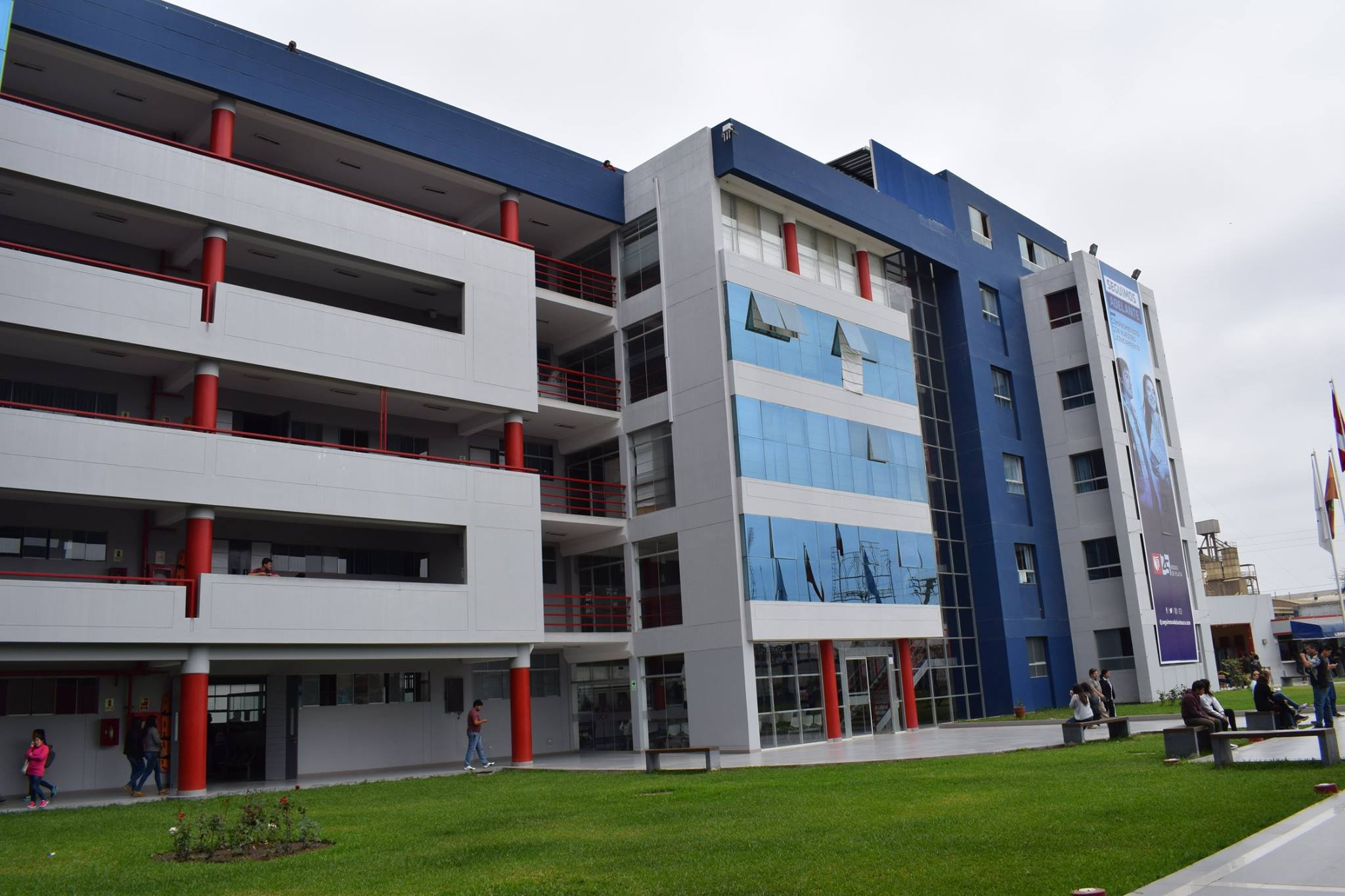
Universidad César Vallejo Chiclayo

The following is a list of the universities located in Chiclayo:

- Catholic University of Santo Toribio de Mogrovejo
- Private University of Juan Mejia Baca
- Señor de Sipan University
- Private University of Chiclayo
- University of Lambayeque
- San Martín de Porres University
- César Vallejo University
- Alas Peruanas University
- Federal Republic of Germany Institute
- Senati, National Industrial Training Service

=== Museums ===
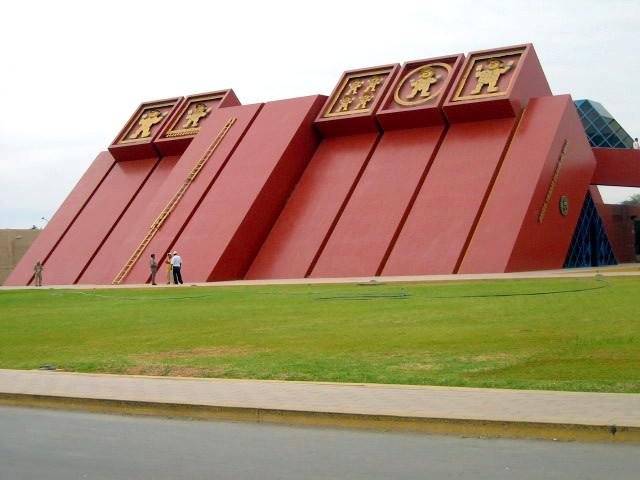
Royal Tombs of Sipan Museum located in Lambayeque

Chiclayo is known for having one of the best museums in Peru, with its most famous being the Royal Tombs of Sipán Museum, which is located in the city of Lambayeque, which is part of the Chiclayo metropolitan area. Other museums in Chiclayo are the Huaca Rajada, similar to the Royal Tombs of Sipan Museum, and the Hans Heinrich Bruning National Museum.

The following is a list of museums in the area:

- Huaca Rajada – Sipan Museum
- Royal Tombs of Sipan Museum
- Sican National Museum
- Hans Heinrich Bruning National Museum
- Museum of Valley of the Pyramids of Tucume
- On Site Museum in Sipán is the newest and the smallest museum.

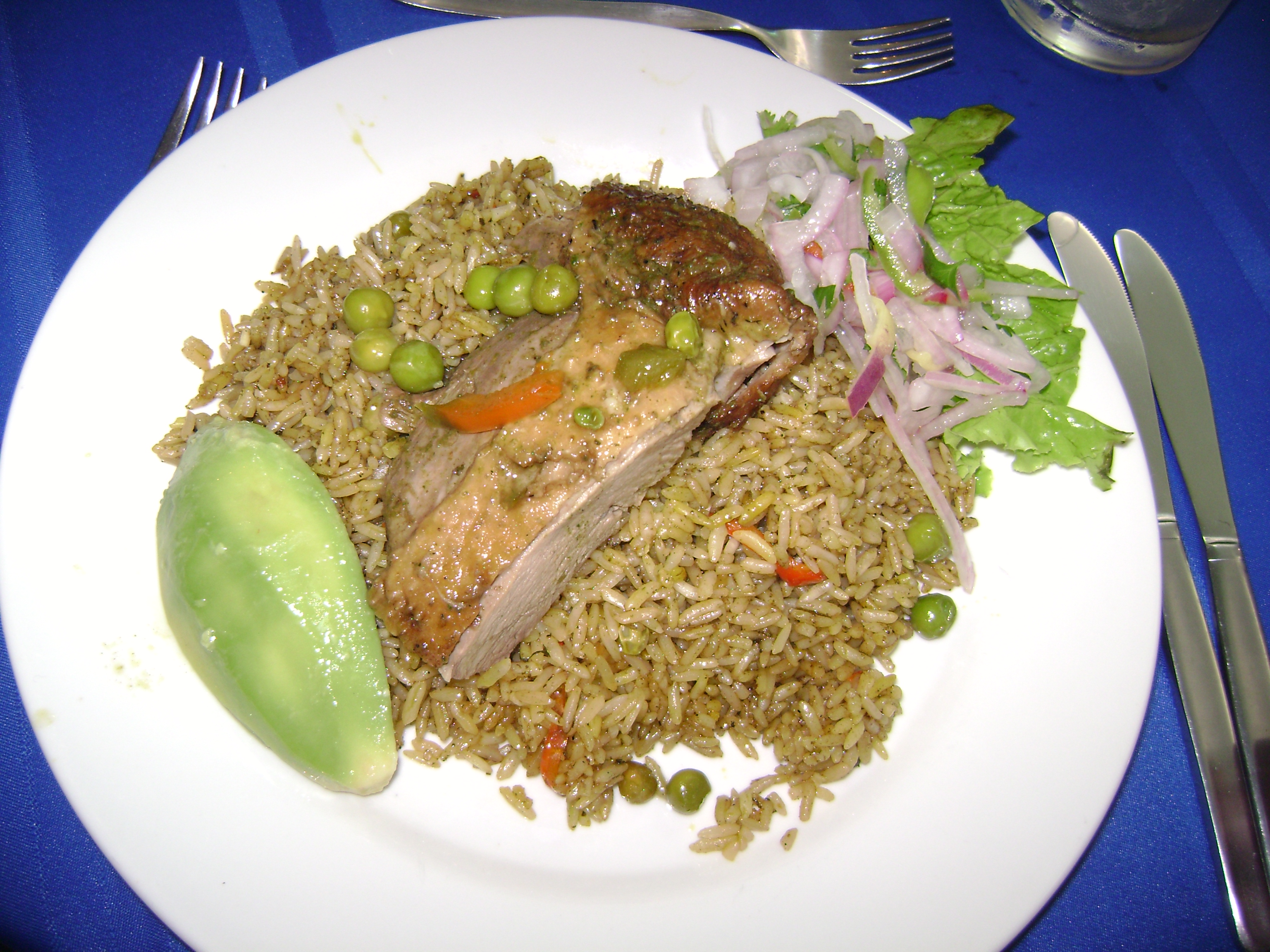
Arroz con pato

=== Cuisine ===
Chiclayo and the Department of Lambayeque's most popular dishes are the Chiclayo Arroz con pato (rice and duck), and Cabrito a la norteña. Arroz con pato is spicy and acidic, containing duck macerated in garlic and vinegar, and peppers. Cabrito a la norteña is served with cooked Yucca, lamb, rice and beans, with a variant from Piura containing tamale instead of yucca. Loche de Lambayque, also known as pumpkin loche, is a type of fruit common in Chiclayo, dating back to pre-Hispanic times.

=== Sport ===
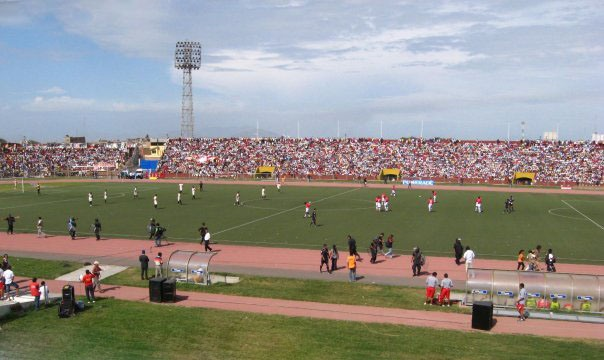
Estadio Elías Aguirre

Association football, or soccer, is the most popular sport in Chiclayo. Chiclayos most popular football club is Juan Aurich of the Peruvian Segunda División, who were champions of the Peruvian Primera División in 2011. Other football clubs in Chiclayo are FC Carlos Stein and Pirata FC. Chiclayos main and largest stadium is Estadio Elías Aguirre, which has a capacity of 24,500 and hosted the 2004 Copa América and 2005 FIFA U-17 World Championship, which was hosted in Peru.

Other popular sports in Chiclayo is Volleyball, basketball, swimming, surfing, athletics and rugby. All are organized by the Peruvian Institute of Sport (IPD).

== Sights and attractions ==
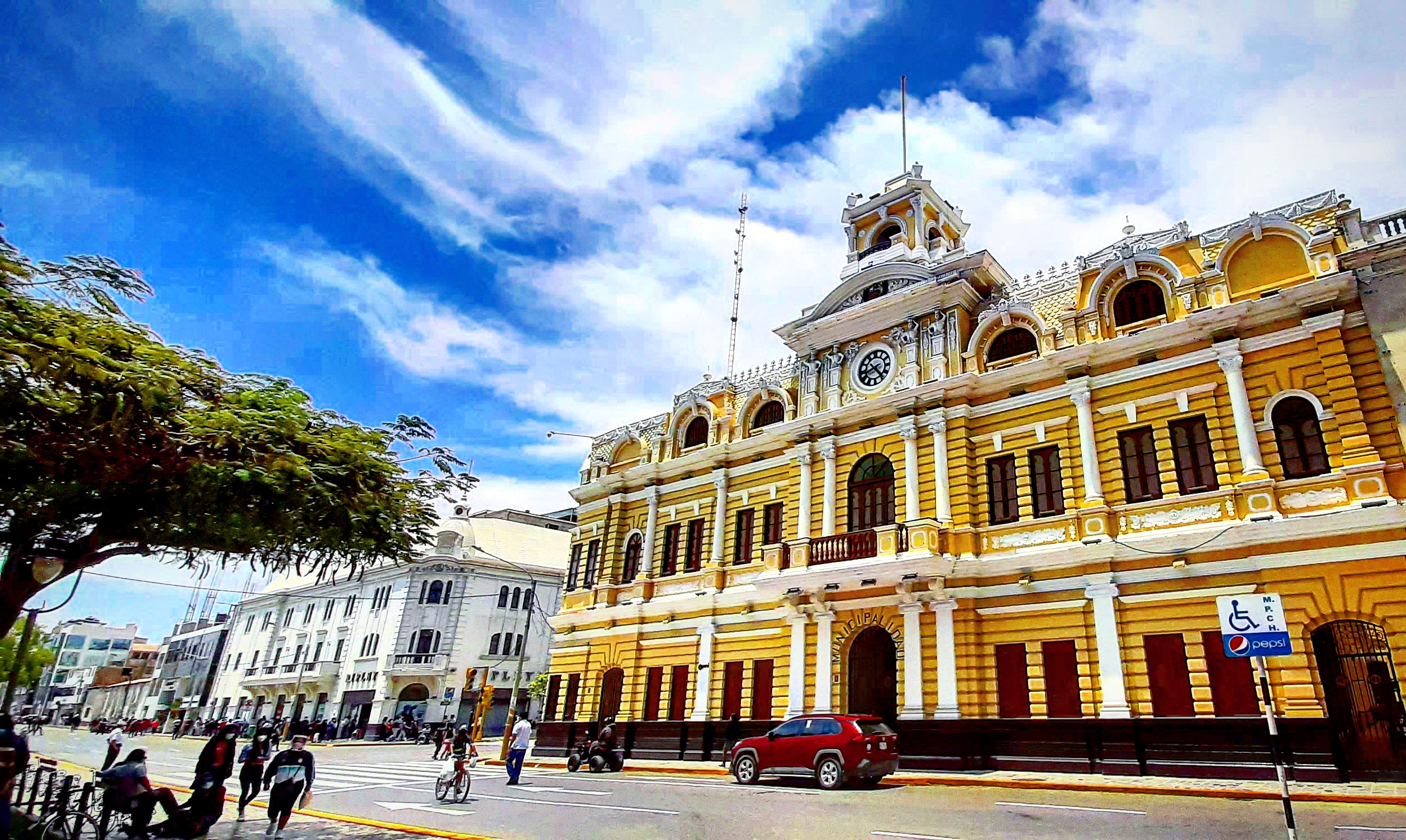
Municipal Palace

The department of Lambayeque is one of the most touristic in the country. It was home to the ancient civilization of the Moche who created some of the most ingenious monuments and works of art known to ancient Peru. In 1987, royal tombs of ancient Moche rulers were excavated. The artifacts found in the tomb were transferred to the Royal Tomb of Sipan Museum in the city of Lambayeque. Also there are the Brunning Museum and the Sicán Museum in Ferreñafe. These museums display the magnificent ancient artwork produced by the ancient Moche. The pyramids of Túcume are also in this area. In 2007, more than 306,000 tourists visited the museums of Lambayeque. There are more than 20 adobe pyramids all of which are 40 m (130 ft) in height and are in an abundance of vegetation and wildlife. Also in the area is the Chaparrí Ecological Reserve which has abundant biodiversity. The department of Lambayeque boasts some of the best cuisine in Peru. The most popular dish in this area is Arroz con Pato (marinated duck with green rice). The city of Chiclayo, the capital of the department, is the second largest in the Peruvian north and has a vibrant nightlife.

- Main Park – Located in the heart of Chiclayo, was built in two sections, it has a pool equipped with three water valves which give rise to three jets of water that form the flag of Peru. Around her are shopping centers, the RENIEC, its cathedral, Hotel Royal, the Old Cinema Tropical and Colonial Theatre and republican buildings and many places where any tourist or citizen might enjoy. Its actual design, with little modification, was built in 1969, a bronze plate still in place attributes the design to Architect Carlos Garrido Lecca.
- Santa María Cathedral – Located in the main square of the city is built in neoclassical style and dates from 1869 by design and drawings of Gustave Eiffel. The cover is two bodies, supported by Doric columns first is in front of three archways. The second presents Corinthian capitals whose intercolumpios appreciate balconies or bay windows. On both sides of the facade stand steeples topped with cupolas. Inside, three bodies, highlights the sculpture of Christ poor and the home of Antonio. The cathedral building was finished near 1945; however, the bells were mounted in 1961.
- Municipal Palace – It stood on the north side of the main park, located on Calle San Jose 823. Elegant building construction (1919), cost more than 30,000 pounds of gold; finished in 1924. It has Republican style with large windows and wrought iron gates. It was destroyed partially by a fire caused by a deplorable political brawl between the Deputy Mayor Jose Barreto Sanchez and his opponent then reinstated Mayor Arturo Castillo Chirinos, who tried to recover the position relying on a ruling of the Constitutional Court, just two months of completing the period for which he was elected in October 2006. It has been restored and is operated as a museum. The Consistorial Room is used several times a year at special ceremonies and events.
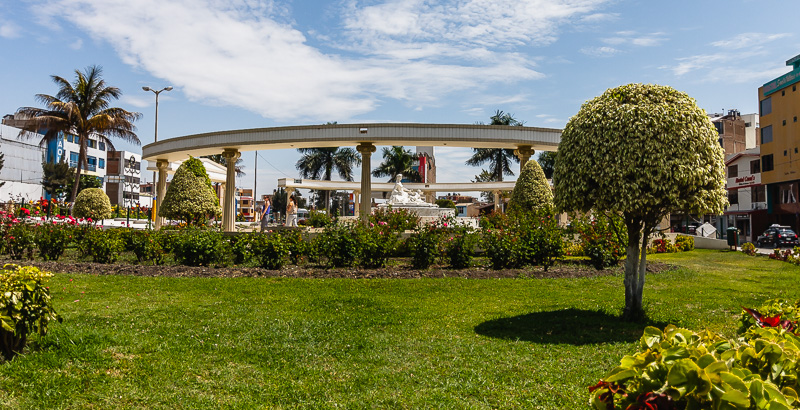
- Pase de las Musas
  La Verónica's Chapel – Situated at Torres Paz 294. Built at the end of the nineteenth century. Declared National Historical Monument in 1987. The altars are covered with gold plate and silver.
- Basilica San Antonio – It is situated in the intersection of streets Torres Paz and Luis Gonzales. San Antonio is home of the Discalced Fathers of Chiclayo, with modern and simple architecture (1949). The main hall is quite large, has arches and in the altar stands the crucifix articulated in polychrome wood sculpture.
- Elías Aguirre Square – Located between Calle Elias Aguirre and San Jose. This was the first place that the travelers could see when getting off the train at the Éten railway station. The statue was made by Peruvian sculptor David Lozano, its construction dates from 1924, and was erected in honor of Commander Elias Aguirre, Chiclayo hero in the Battle of Angamos of 1879.
- Municipal Library José Eufemio Lora y Lora – It has one of the largest facilities of its kind in Peru. Due to bad administration and lack of investment of any kind, its collection is extremely poor and outdated meagerly. It has no services such as a Catalog, Internet and multimedia and also lacks professional management with a year budget of under US$18,000. It has no branches (it would take four or five only in the district capital) and should be given priority and a serious investment plan. The collection is under 10,000 mostly old items, when it should be of 50.000 to 90.000 titles, organized and constantly renewed.
- Centro Cívico – Civic Center – When the Éten Railway Station was closed, the land was assigned to the Civic Center. The first building was for the Chiclayo Central Mail (now SERPOST), next was the Banco de la Nación, then the Municipal Library JELyL, followed by the SUNAT building, the new Lambayeque Judicial Superior Courts, and finally, the Ministerio Público (Attorneys) of Lambayeque. It is only eight blocks West of the Main Park, near the new location of the operational Provincial Municipality of Chiclayo, now working at the Mutual Chiclayo building.
- Parque Infantil – Children Park – It is the largest and one of the oldest parks in the city with many recreational areas, it also has a large stage for outdoor spectacles, as well as a collection of plant species from around the world distributed along the roads of the park with a greenhouse at the end, all in an area of 1.8 hectares (4.4 acres). It is also home for one of the many Boy Scouts groups distributed along the city.

== Transportation ==
=== Air ===
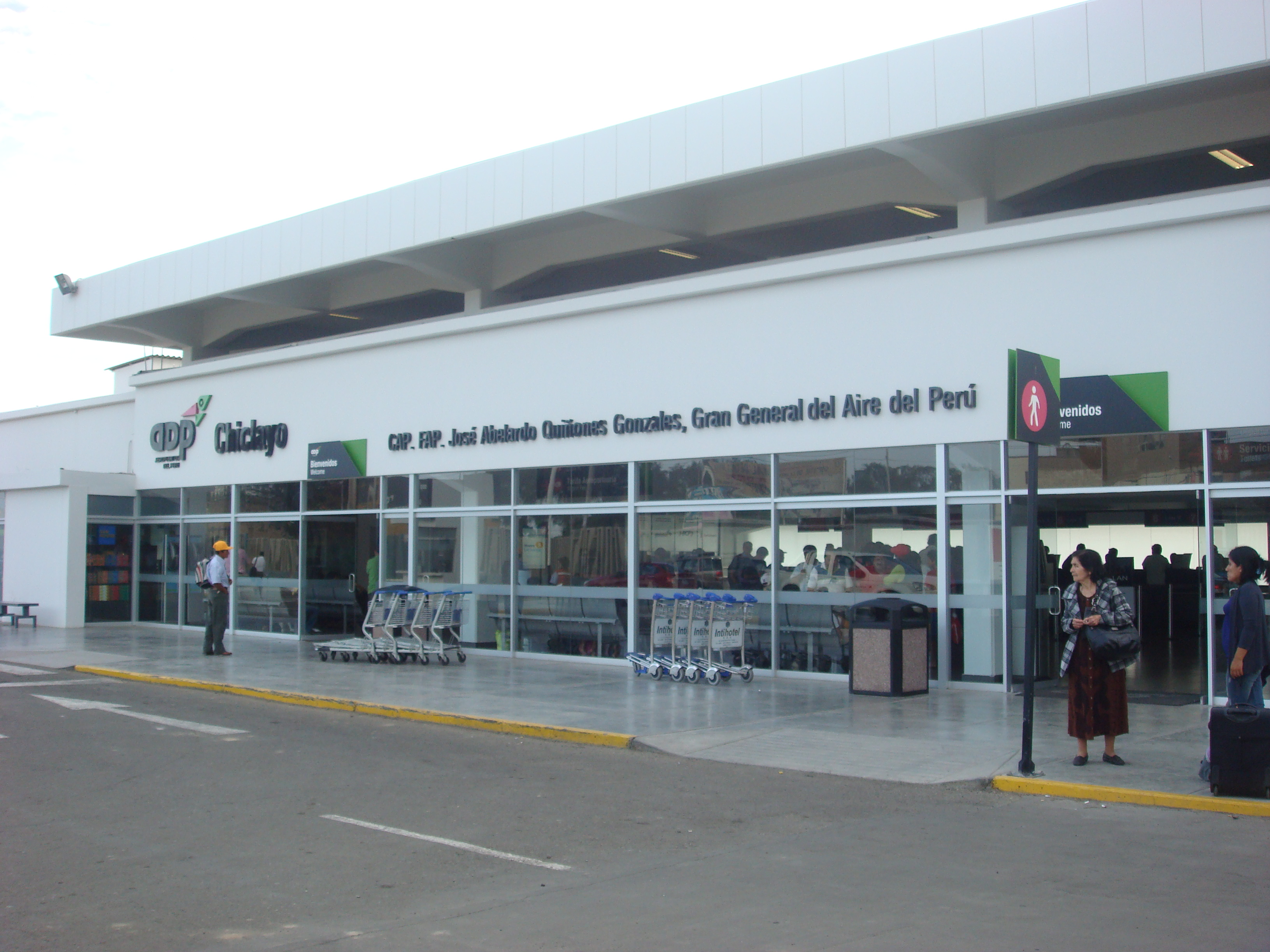
The entrance to the passenger terminal

FAP Captain José Abelardo Quiñones González International Airport (IATA: CIX, ICAO: SPHI) is the main airport serving Chiclayo and the surrounding metropolitan area. It is run by ADP, a private airport operator that operates various airports in northern Peru. The airport hosts domestic airlines, international airlines flights, and fuel supply services. The terminal has a runway of 2,520 by 45 m (8,268 by 148 ft).

Many airlines serve Chiclayo's international airport, including JetSmart Perú, LATAM Perú and Star Perú offering domestic service to Lima. In July 2016, Copa Airlines began direct flights between Chiclayo and its hub in Panama, making it the first ever international flight to arrive to the city. US-based Spirit Airlines has expressed interest in serving Chiclayo from its hub in Fort Lauderdale, Florida, United States. Star Perú opened destinations to Tarapoto and Iquitos in December of 2023.

=== Land ===
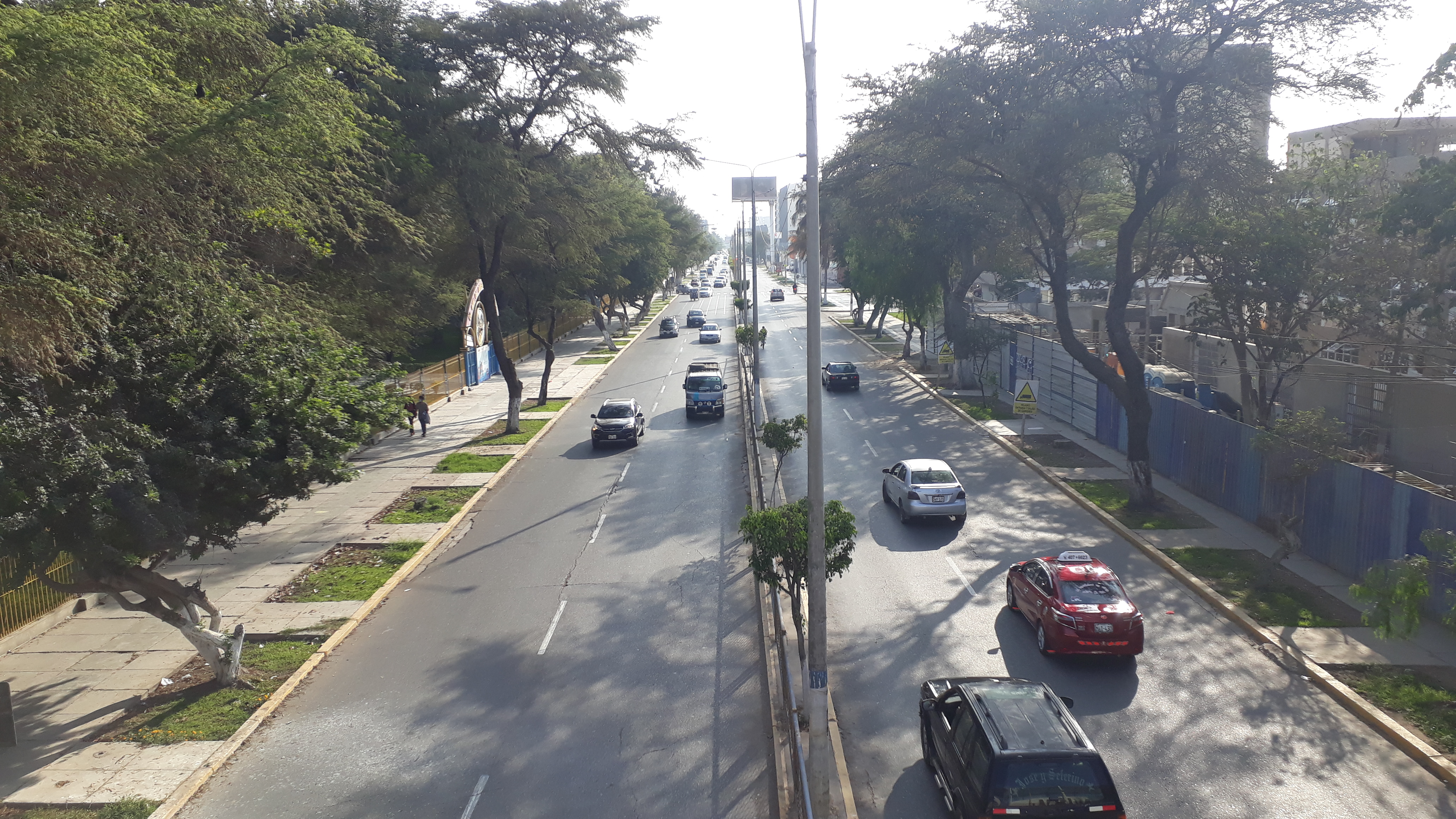
Avenida Salaverry

Chiclayo, because of its location, serves as a point of interconnection for various cities of the Northeast of the country and has various bus companies which service cities such as Lima, Trujillo, Piura, Cajamarca, Chota, Cutervo, Bagua, Jaén, Chachapoyas, and Tumbes.

To adequately accommodate the transportation demand, the city is served by two different land terminals, one located towards the southern end of the city and another at the northern end on the Panamerican Highway. A substantial number of bus companies have their own terminals, many of them located near the downtown of the city and in nearby areas. These interprovincial buses contribute to the congestion experienced in downtown Chiclayo. To try to solve the problem the city government has proposed a plan to build a central station in the city.

Regionally, there are various different public services such as combis, cousters, colectivos, which provide services within the districts and provinces of the department of Lambayeque. There are also an overwhelming number of private taxis which incessantly honk their horns throughout the downtown area of the city, causing a great deal of unwanted noise pollution.

== Notable people ==
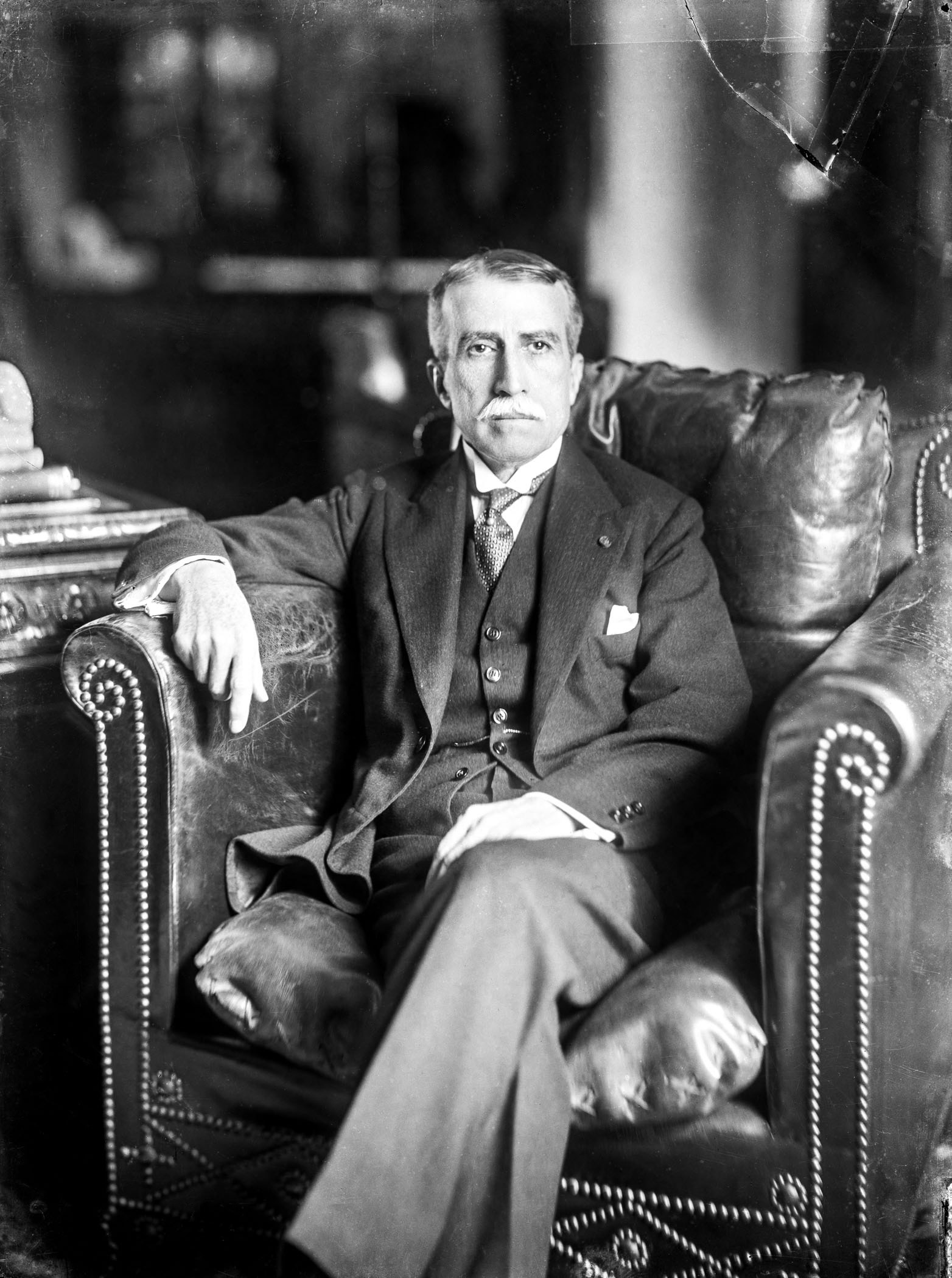
Augusto B. Leguia was president of Peru in three periods.

- José Quiñones Gonzales, national hero and aviator
- Elías Aguirre Romero, national hero and navy officer
- Diego Ferré Sosa, national hero and navy officer
- Augusto B. Leguía, President of Peru (1908–1912, 1919–1930)
- Enrique López Albújar, writer
- Luis Castañeda, Mayor of Lima (2005–2010, 2015–2018)
- Federico Kauffman Doig; historian, archaeologist and anthropologist.
- Pope Leo XIV (born Robert Francis Prevost), formerly Bishop of Chiclayo (2015–2023).
- Eduardo Orrego Villacorta, architect
- Tania Libertad, singer

== Twin towns – sister cities ==
Chiclayo is twinned with:

- Banfield, Argentina
- Bocono, Venezuela
- Cuenca, Ecuador
- Loja, Ecuador

== See also ==
- Metropolitan areas of Peru
- Lambayeque Region

== Bibliography ==
- Guía metropolitana, comercial, industrial y estadística de la ciudad de Chiclayo. Ciudad Comercial del Norte peruano. Chiclayo, 2002, incluye un croquis de la ciudad de Chiclayo.
- Diario la industria de Chiclayo.suplemento dominical.-Comentarios de la actualización del plan regulador "Chiclayo 2020".
- "Ponencia: "Hacia una ciudad sostenible", Ex alcalde de Chiclayo Dr. Arturo Castillo Chirinos.
- "Ciudad Heroica" Columna del diario El correo de Chiclayo. Dr. Fernando Bartra Grosso.
- " Modernización de Chiclayo ha comenzado" Jorge Incháustegui Samamé. Enlace del catatro Sach.
- "Historia de la ciudad de Reque" Ministerio evangelistico nueva vida. Dante Samillán Rodriguez.
- "Planificacion y desarrollo de la ciudad de Chiclayo metropolitano". prolongación al sur de la ciudad, -historia de Reque en la ciudad de Chiclayo-, -creación del distrito de la victoria. Dante Samillán Rodriguez.
- "Futuro de Chiclayo, encuentro económico APEC, mejoramiento de la ciudad de chiclayo". diario la industria.
- ALCALDE, Nélida. Los tugurios en el centro urbano de Chiclayo, 1940–1970. TLS/UNPRG, Lambayeque, 1984.
- BAZÁN, Inés y José GÓMEZ. Capitalismo y región en Lambayeque. Instituto de Estudios Sociales Naymlap, Chiclayo, 1983, 125 pp.
- CARDOSO, César. "El poder económico en Lambayeque". En: Dominical, Suplemento de La Industria, Chiclayo, domingo 5 de marzo de 1995, pp. 4–5.
- BACHMANN, Carlos J. Departamento de Lambayeque. Monografía Histórico – Geográfica.
- ASENJO MUNDACA, Clara; SANTA CRUZ ROJAS, Hilda R. Educación y crisis en el distrito de La Victoria 1987–1994. TLS/UNPRG, Lambayeque, 1994.
- ALVARADO, D. y F. EFFIO. Desarrollo urbano de la ciudad de Chiclayo 1875–1981. TLS, UNPRG, Lambayeque, 1984.
- Plan director 2020 y catastro urbano de la ciudad de Chiclayo.
