= Chiclayo (disambiguation) =

Chiclayo may refer to:

- Chiclayo, a city in Peru.
- Chiclayo District, a district in the Chiclayo Province.
- Chiclayo Province, a province in the Lambayeque Region in Peru.
