= Pomalca District =

Coordinates: 6.7695°S 79.7915°W

Pomalca
- District
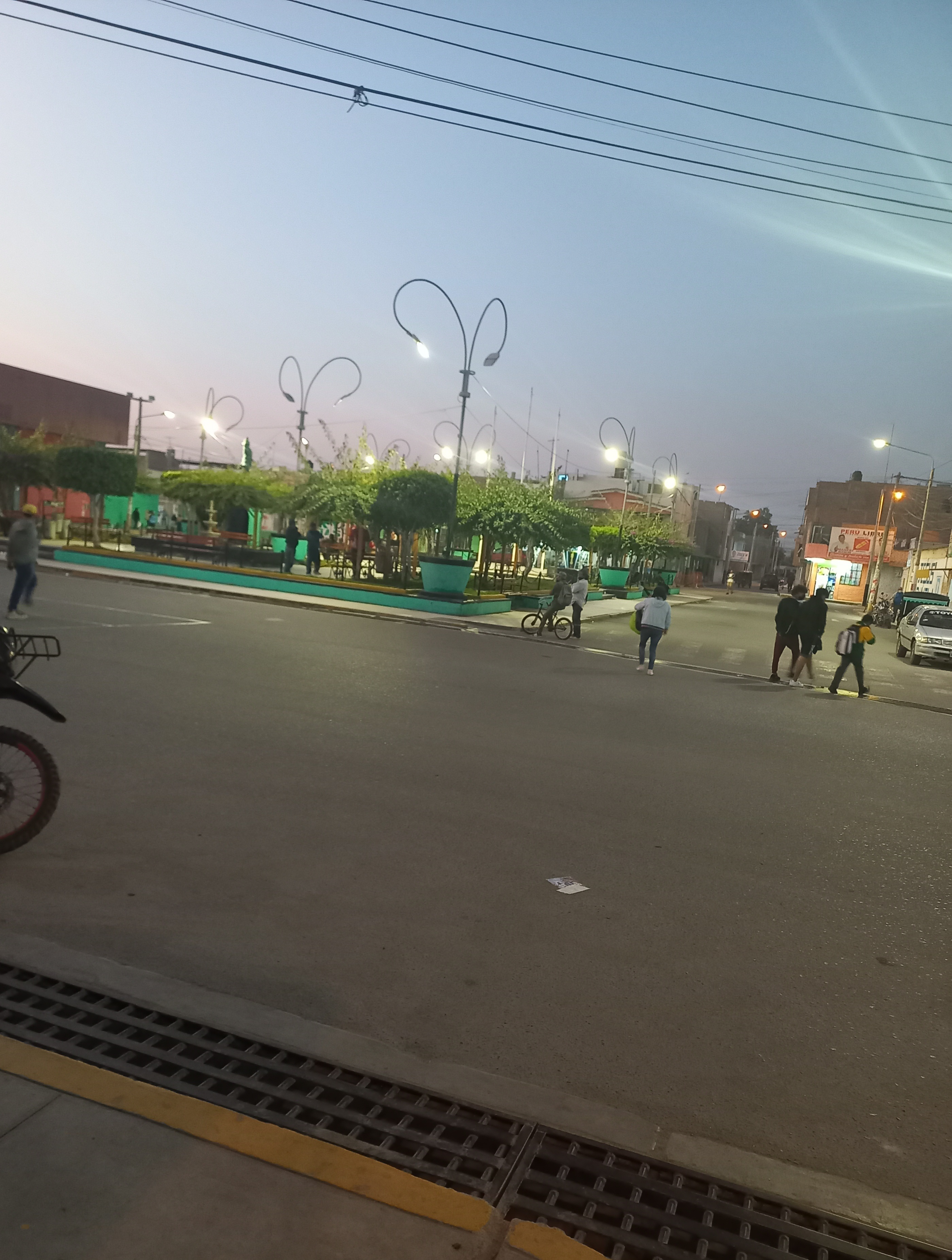
- Túpac Amaru park

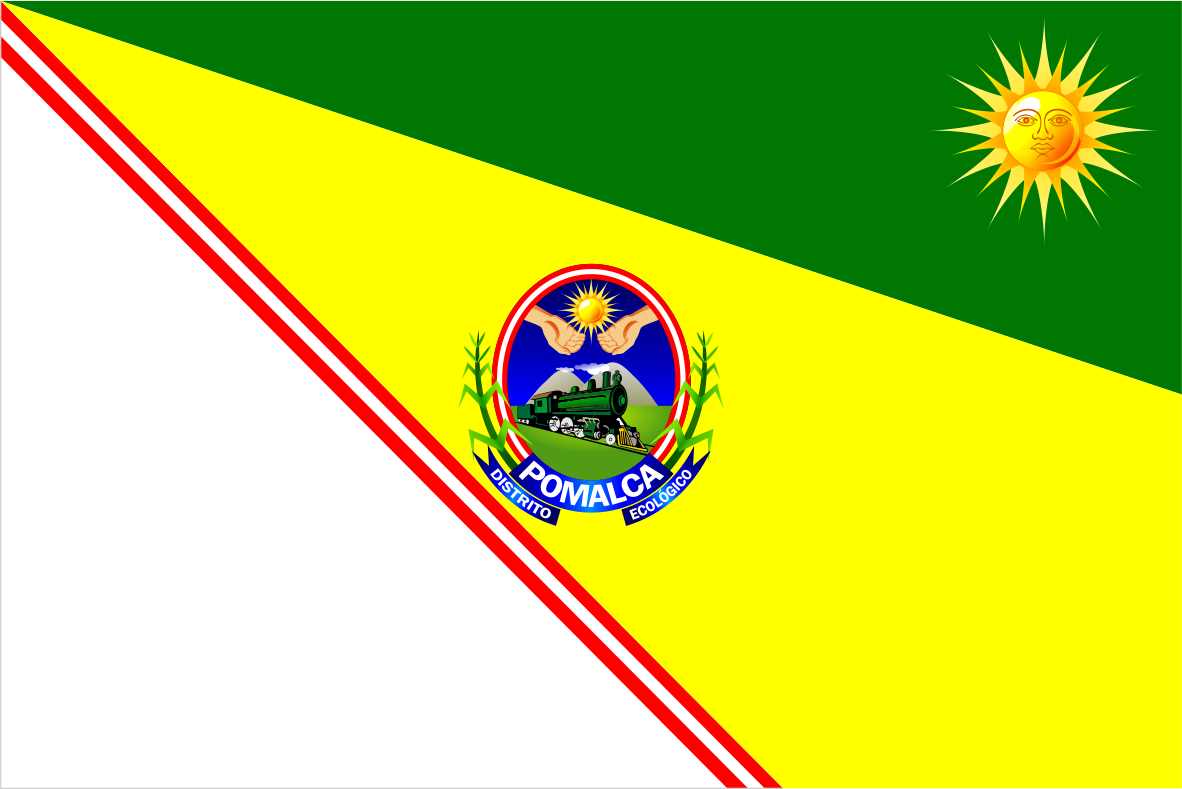
- Flag
- Interactive map of Pomalca
- Country: Peru
- Region: Lambayeque
- Province: Chiclayo
- Founded: January 29, 1998
- Capital: Pomalca

Government
  - Mayor: Manfri Bernal Yovera

Area
  - Total: 80.35 km^{2} (31.02 sq mi)
- Elevation: 88 m (289 ft)

Population (2005 census)
  - Total: 23,134
  - Density: 287.9/km^{2} (745.7/sq mi)
- Time zone: UTC-5 (PET)
- UBIGEO: 140118

Pomalca District is one of twenty districts of the province Chiclayo in Peru. It limits by the North with the District of Picsi; by the East with the district of Tumán; to the south with the districts of Reque and Monsefú; and to the west with the districts of Chiclayo and José Leonardo Ortiz.

== Population centers ==
- Casa de Madera
- Collud
- El Combo
- El Chorro
- El Invernillo
- San Juan
- La Union
- Las Palmeras
- 20 de Enero
- El Lino
- Ventarrón
- Collud
- Miraflores
- San Borja

== History ==
=== Origin and foundation ===
Pomalca is one of the Lambayecan districts with a great mixture of traditions and customs of different human groups, between regional and foreign, that for more than four centuries of existence brought their own culture to this land to intertwine, formed by descendants of Ventarrón and Collús.

=== Stage of encomienda ===
Pomalca at the beginning was an encomienda that the Spanish Crown would create with the aim of controlling its new possessions in this part of the continent, and it began to entrust these lands and their inhabitants to those who participated in this conquest. Francisco Luís de Alcántara is entrusted with the lands occupied by the callancanos to make them produce wealth for him and the Spanish crown.
