= Pimentel District =

Coordinates: 6.8359°S 79.9356°W

Pimentel
- District
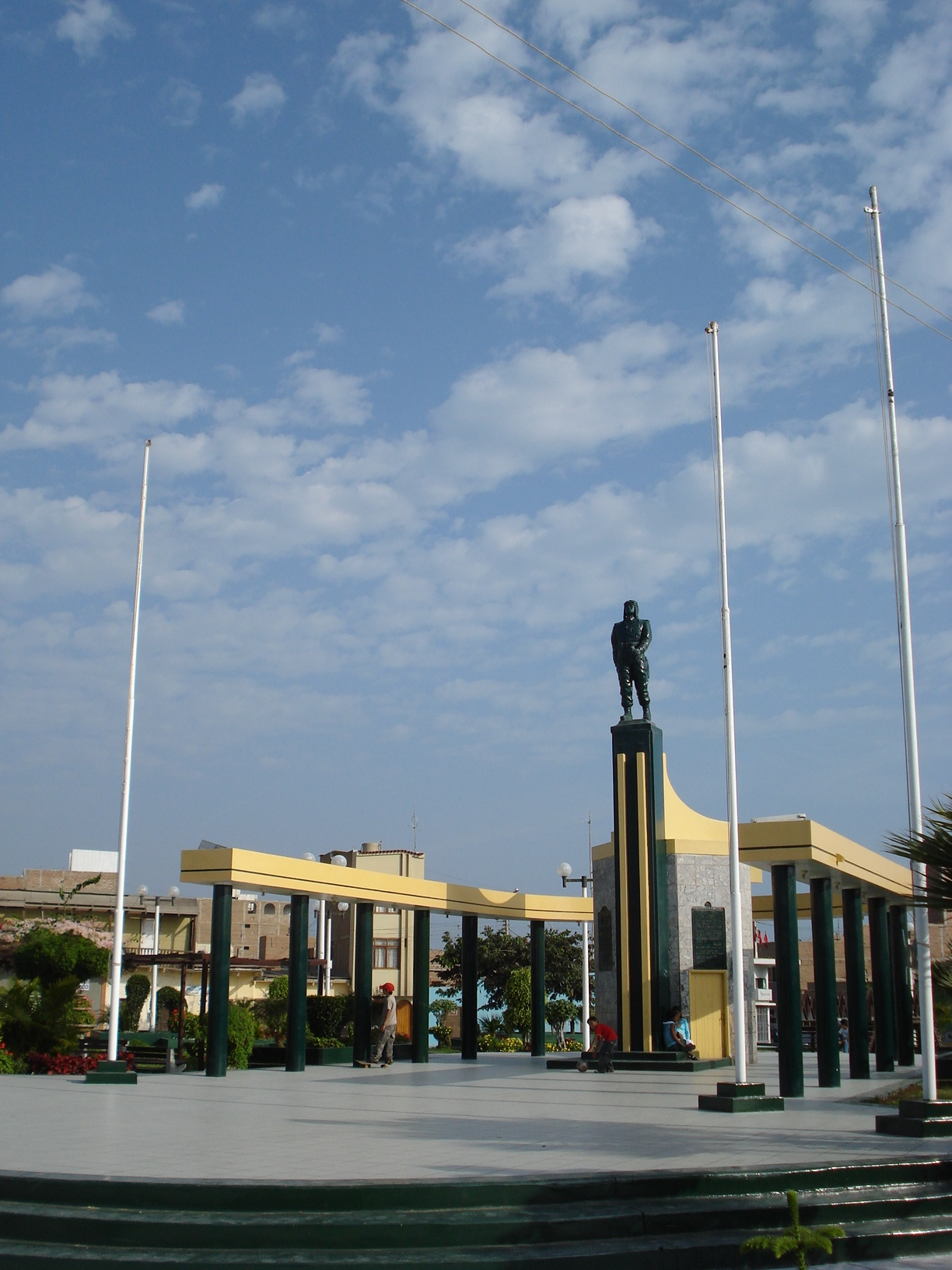
- Monument in memory of José Quiñones Gonzales
- Interactive map of Pimentel
- Country: Peru
- Region: Lambayeque
- Province: Chiclayo
- Founded: October 18, 1920
- Capital: Pimentel

Government
  - Mayor: Cesar Roberto Jacinto Purizaca

Area
  - Total: 66.53 km^{2} (25.69 sq mi)
- Elevation: 4 m (13 ft)

Population (2017 census)
  - Total: 44,602
  - Density: 670.4/km^{2} (1,736/sq mi)
- Time zone: UTC-5 (PET)
- UBIGEO: 140112

Pimentel District is one of twenty districts of the Chiclayo province in Peru. The beach (Playa Pimentel) and reed watercraft caballitos de totora are among its most popular attractions.

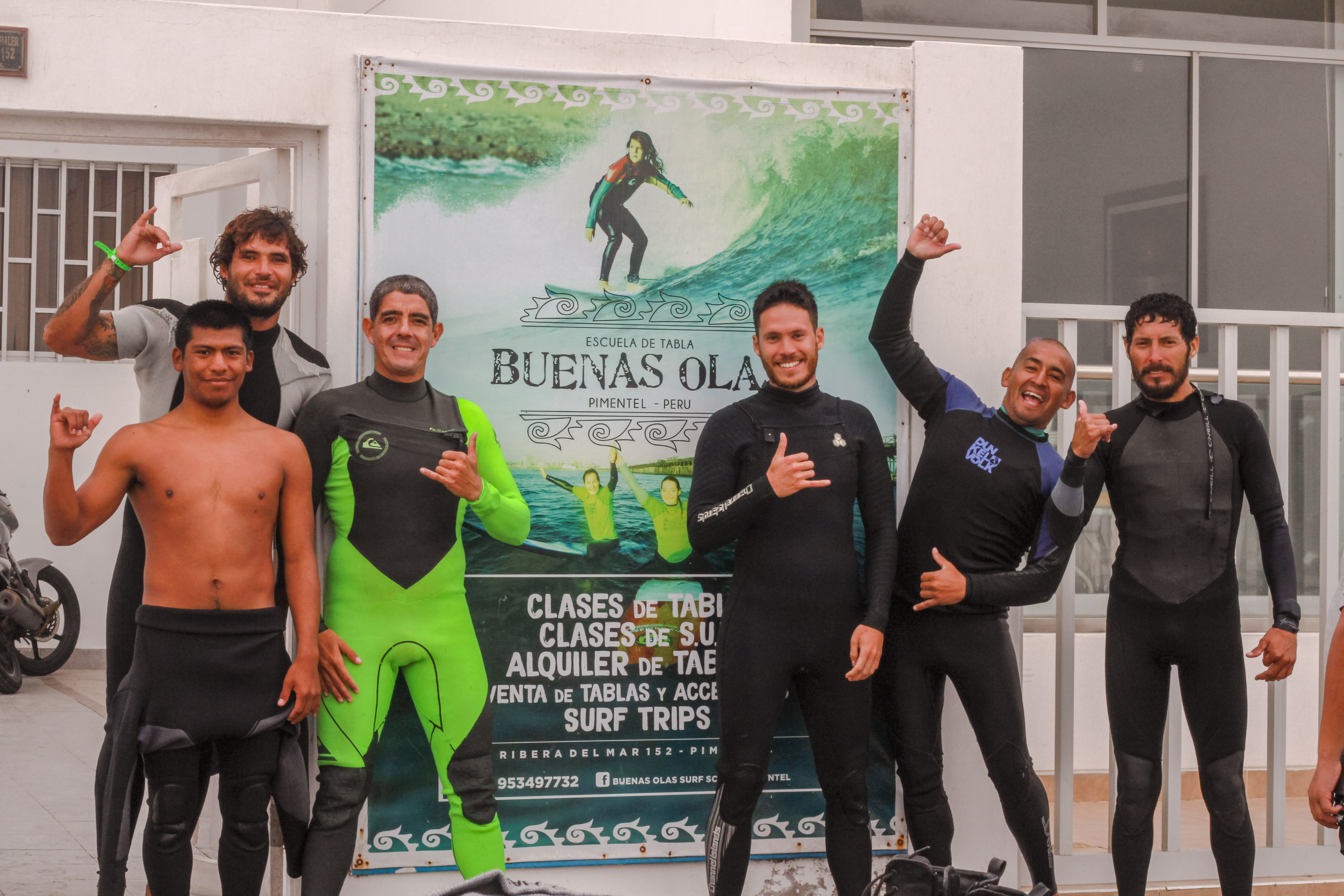

== Gallery ==
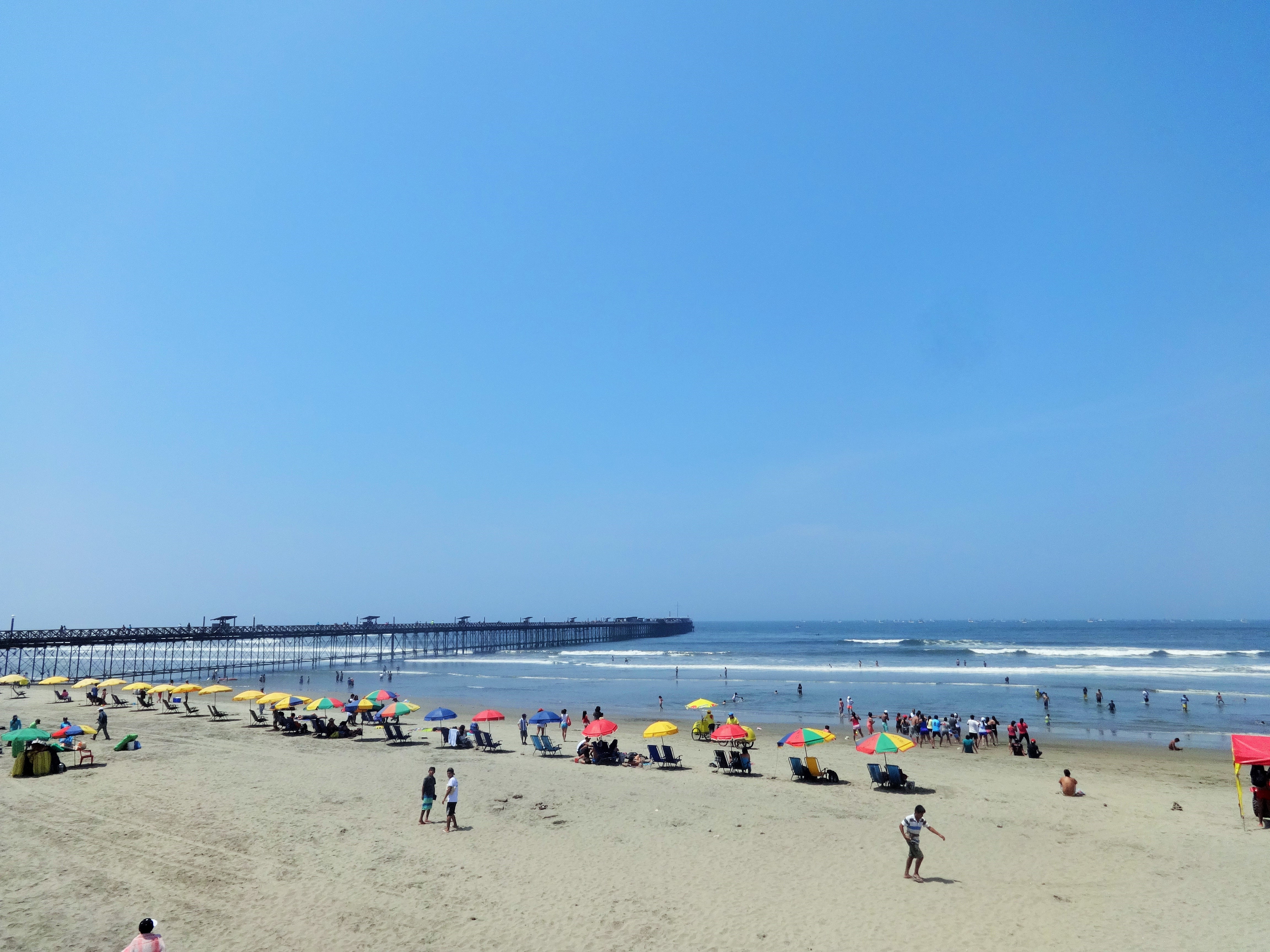
Playa Pimentel, along the Pacific coast.

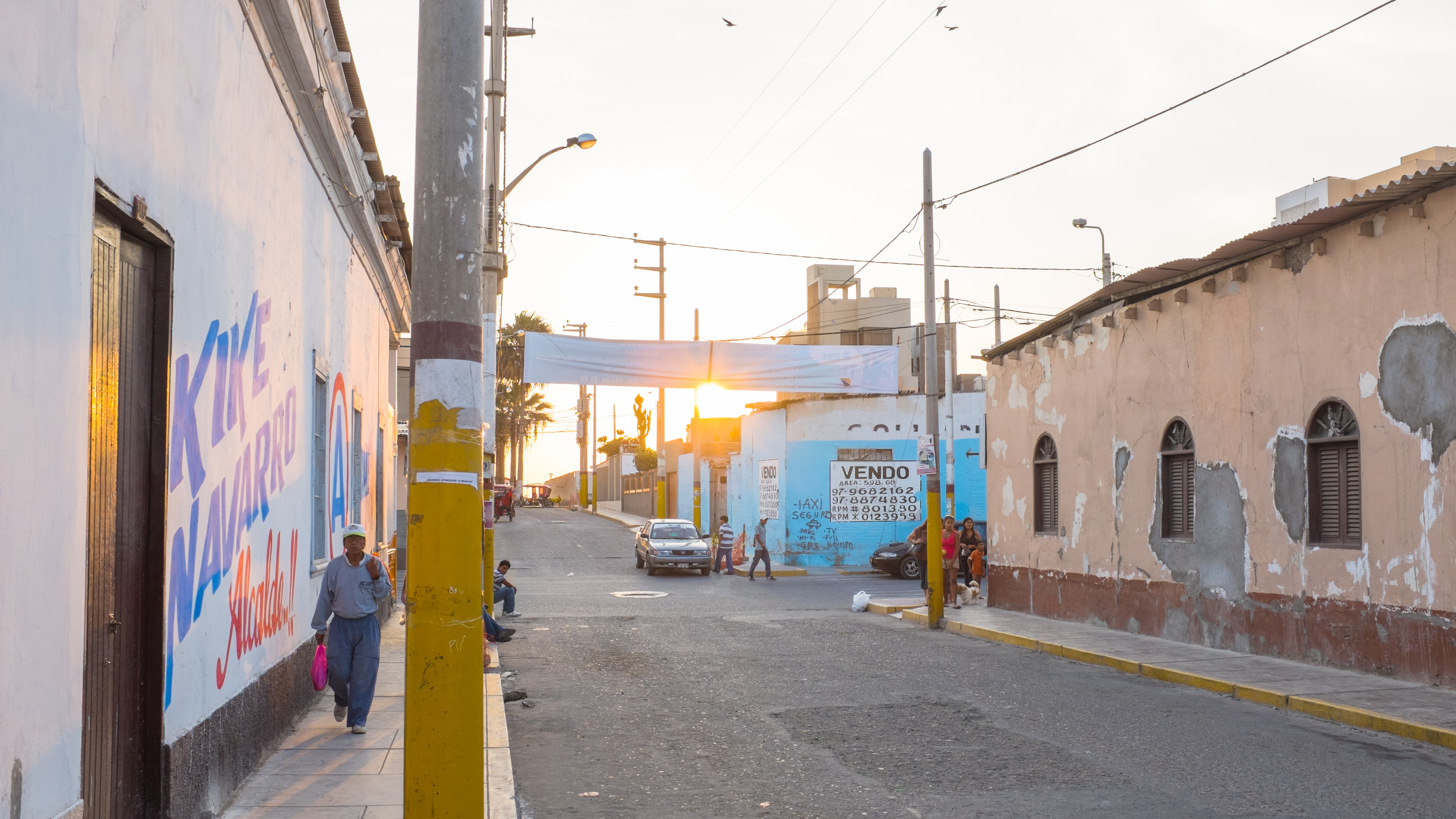
Sun setting over Chiclayo Street, Pimentel.

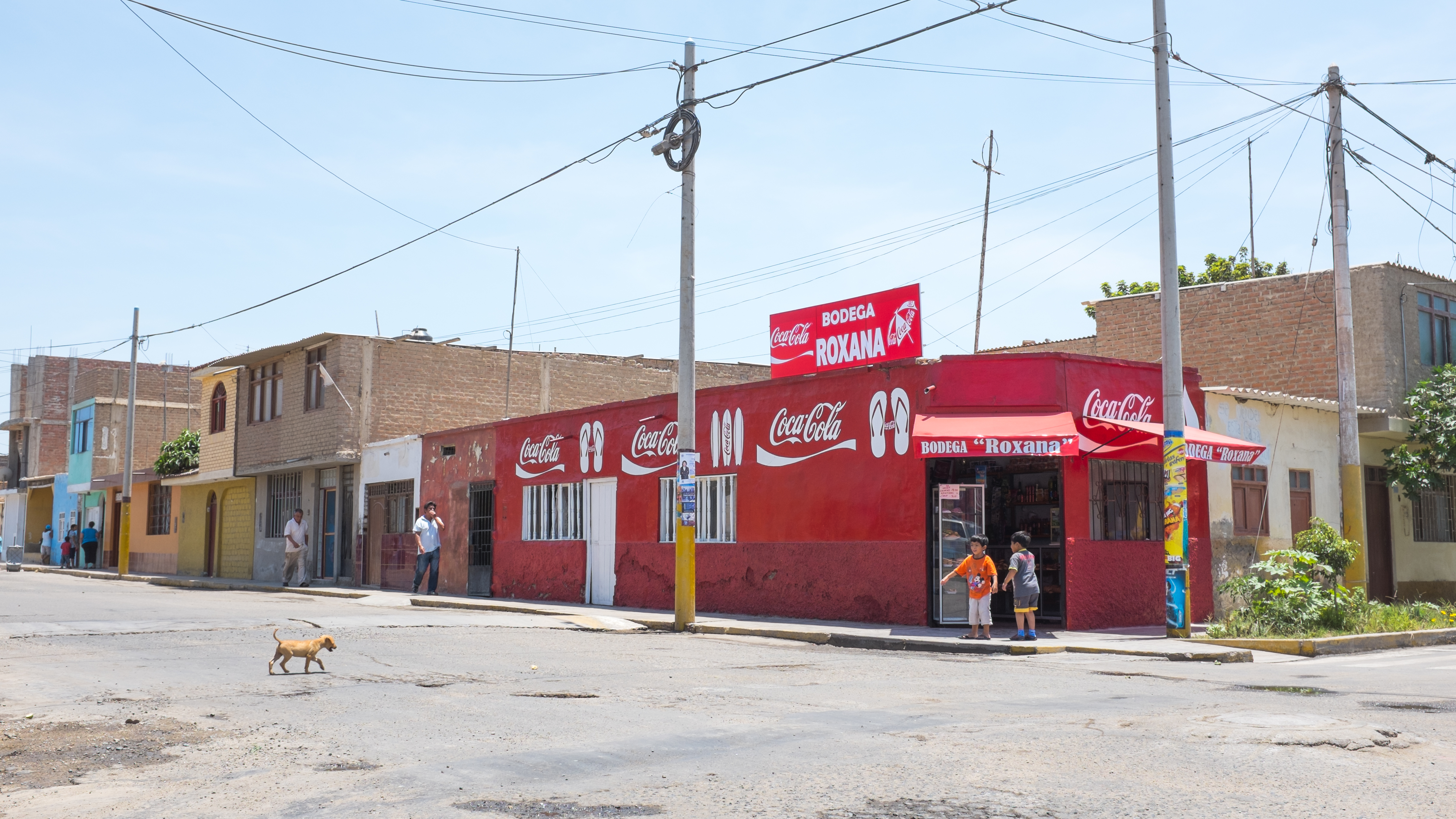
Not far from the central market in Pimentel.

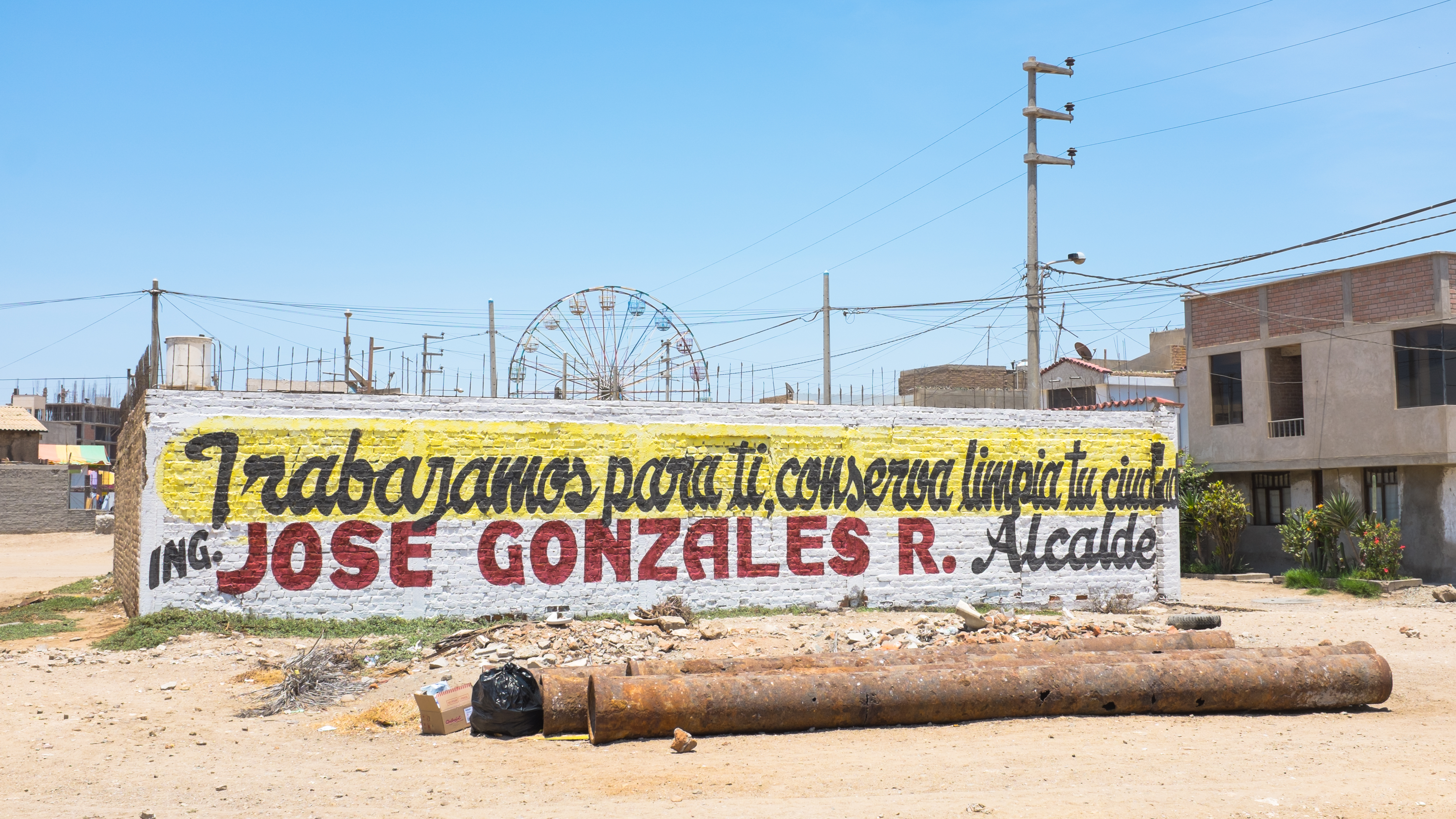
The usual slogans for the municipal elections, Pimentel.
