= La Victoria District, Chiclayo =

Coordinates: 6.7975°S 79.8441°W

La Victoria District
- District
- Interactive map of La Victoria District
- Country: Peru
- Region: Lambayeque
- Province: Chiclayo
- Founded: September 13, 1984
- Capital: La Victoria

Government
  - Mayor: Anselmo Lozano Centurion

Area
  - Total: 29.36 km^{2} (11.34 sq mi)
- Elevation: 30 m (98 ft)

Population (2005 census)
  - Total: 75,729
  - Density: 2,579/km^{2} (6,680/sq mi)
- Time zone: UTC-5 (PET)
- UBIGEO: 140106

La Victoria District is one of twenty districts of the province Chiclayo in Peru.
