= San José District, Lambayeque =

Coordinates: 6.7654°S 79.9780°W

San José District Distrito de San José
- District
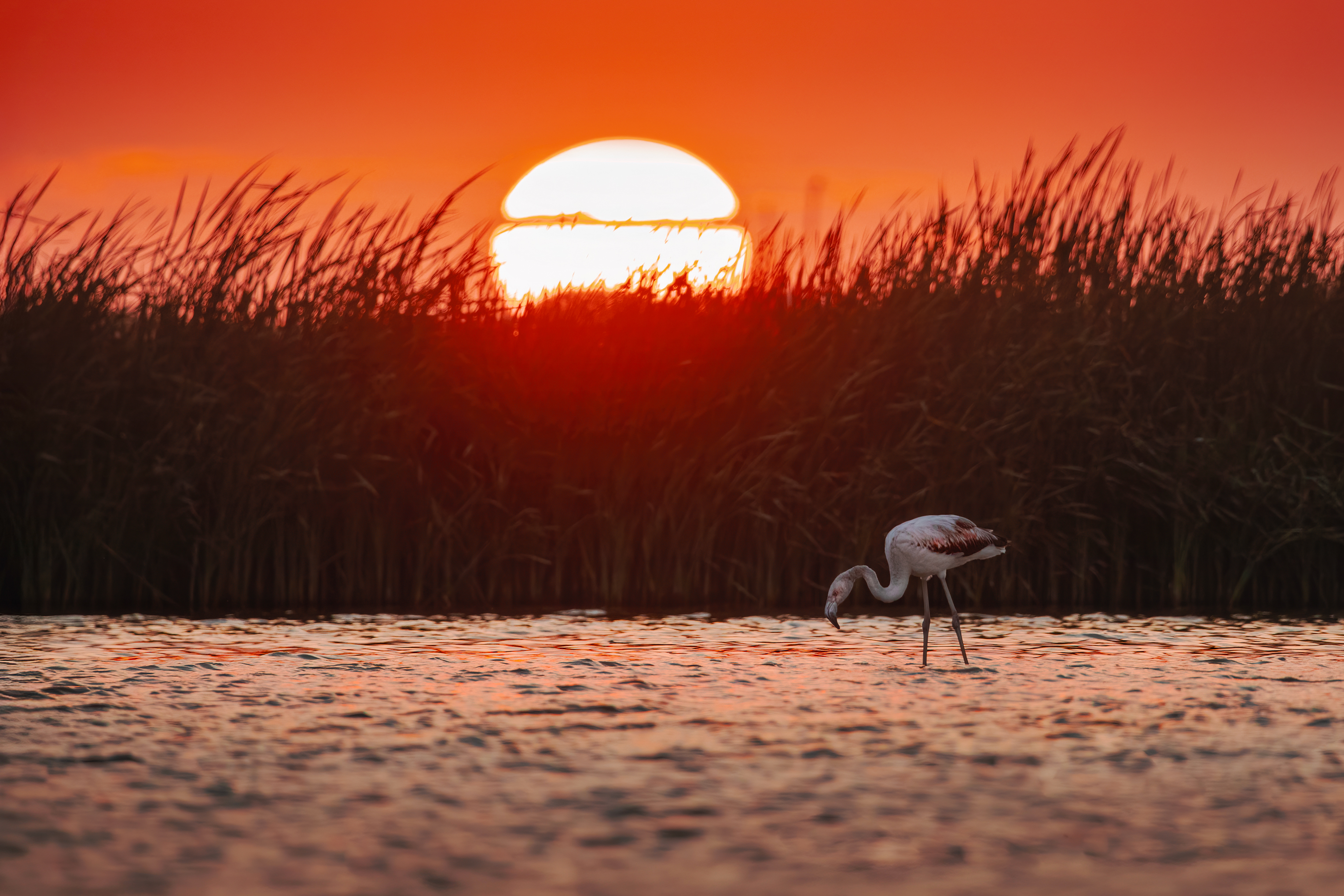
- flamingo in San José wetlands
- Interactive map of San José District
- Country: Peru
- Region: Lambayeque
- Province: Lambayeque
- Founded: November 17, 1894
- Capital: San José

Government
  - Mayor: Percy Willy Llenque Curo

Area
  - Total: 46.73 km^{2} (18.04 sq mi)
- Elevation: 8 m (26 ft)

Population (2005 census)
  - Total: 12,156
  - Density: 260.1/km^{2} (673.7/sq mi)
- Time zone: UTC-5 (PET)
- UBIGEO: 140311

San José District is one of twelve districts of the province Lambayeque in Peru.

== Climate ==
Climate data for Lambayeque, San José, elevation 8 m (26 ft), (1991–2020)
Month	Jan	Feb	Mar	Apr	May	Jun	Jul	Aug	Sep	Oct	Nov	Dec	Year
Mean daily maximum °C (°F)	28.5 (83.3)	29.5 (85.1)	29.2 (84.6)	27.8 (82.0)	25.8 (78.4)	24.1 (75.4)	23.1 (73.6)	22.8 (73.0)	23.2 (73.8)	23.8 (74.8)	24.7 (76.5)	26.5 (79.7)	25.8 (78.4)
Mean daily minimum °C (°F)	20.3 (68.5)	21.6 (70.9)	21.4 (70.5)	19.9 (67.8)	18.5 (65.3)	17.4 (63.3)	16.3 (61.3)	15.9 (60.6)	16.0 (60.8)	16.3 (61.3)	16.9 (62.4)	18.4 (65.1)	18.2 (64.8)
Average precipitation mm (inches)	2.7 (0.11)	11.4 (0.45)	17.6 (0.69)	3.5 (0.14)	0.6 (0.02)	0.4 (0.02)	0.1 (0.00)	0.0 (0.0)	0.5 (0.02)	0.8 (0.03)	1.2 (0.05)	2.4 (0.09)	41.2 (1.62)
Source: National Meteorology and Hydrology Service of Peru
