= José Leonardo Ortiz District =

Coordinates: 6.7457°S 79.8455°W

José Leonardo Ortiz
- District
- Interactive map of José Leonardo Ortiz
- Country: Peru
- Region: Lambayeque
- Province: Chiclayo
- Founded: November 28, 1961
- Capital: San Carlos

Government
  - Mayor: Javier Alejandro Castro Cruz

Area
  - Total: 28.22 km^{2} (10.90 sq mi)
- Elevation: 40 m (130 ft)

Population (2005 census)
  - Total: 153,472
  - Density: 5,438/km^{2} (14,090/sq mi)
- Time zone: UTC-5 (PET)
- UBIGEO: 140105

José Leonardo Ortiz District is one of twenty districts of the province Chiclayo in Peru.
