= Reque District =

Coordinates: 6.8650°S 79.8116°W

Reque
- District
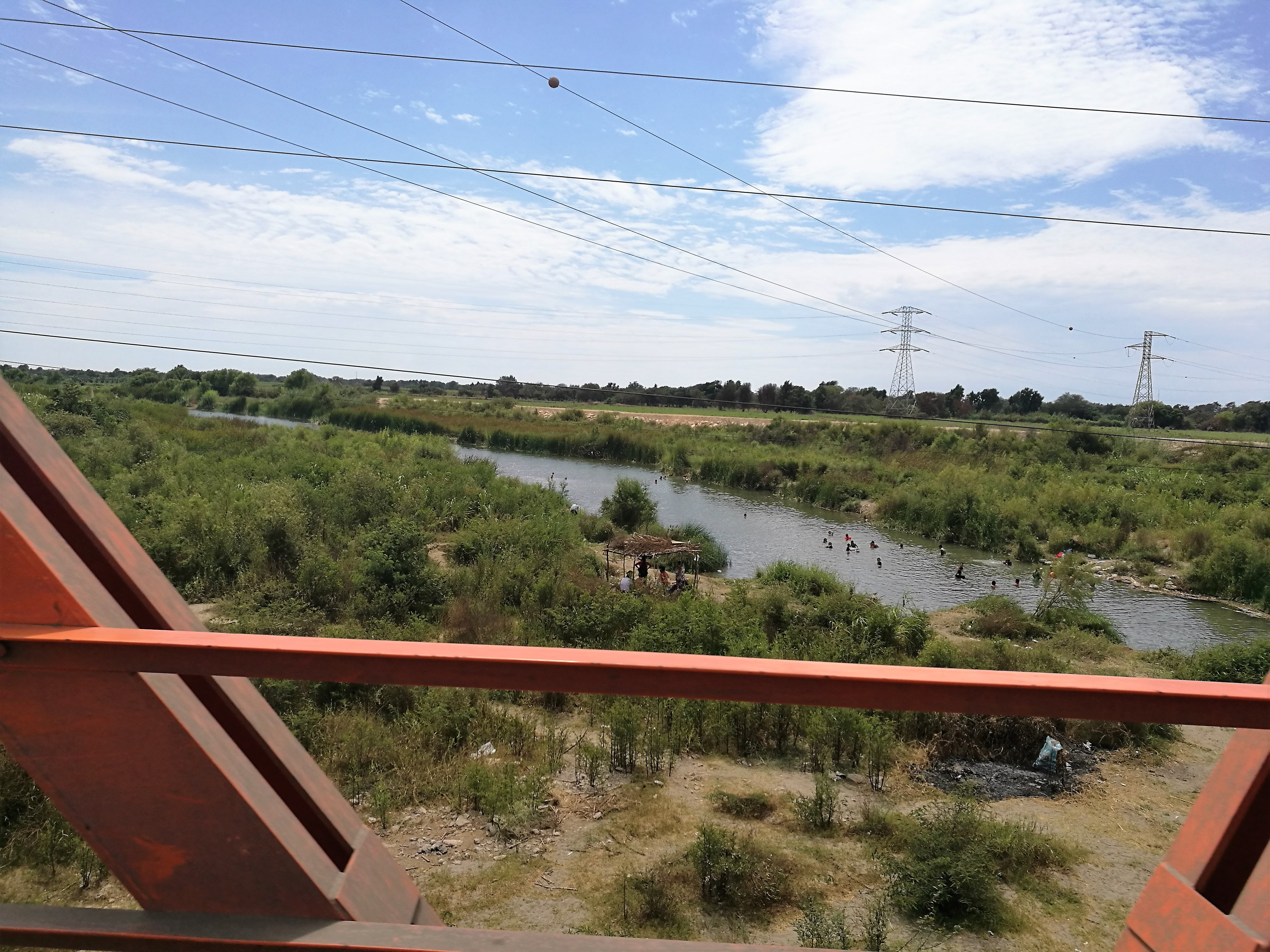
- Interactive map of Reque
- Country: Peru
- Region: Lambayeque
- Province: Chiclayo
- Capital: Reque

Government
  - Mayor: Junior Vasquez Torres

Area
  - Total: 47.03 km^{2} (18.16 sq mi)
- Elevation: 22 m (72 ft)

Population (2005 census)
  - Total: 12,690
  - Density: 269.8/km^{2} (698.9/sq mi)
- Time zone: UTC-5 (PET)
- UBIGEO: 140113

Reque District is one of twenty districts of the province Chiclayo in Peru.
