= Chiclayo District =

Coordinates: 6.7718°S 79.8393°W

Chiclayo Distrito de Chiclayo
- District
- Chiclayo District
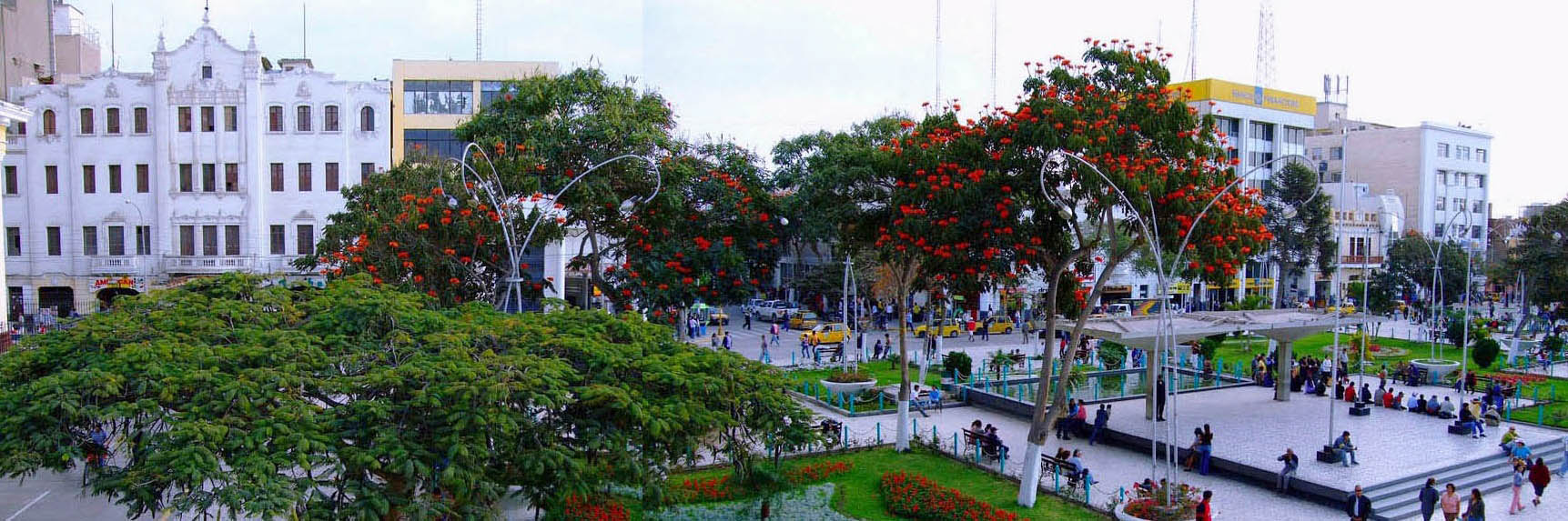
- Interactive map of Chiclayo
- Country: Peru
- Region: Lambayeque
- Province: Chiclayo
- Capital: Chiclayo

Government
  - Mayor: Janet Cubas Carranza (2023-2026)

Area
  - Total: 50.35 km^{2} (19.44 sq mi)
- Elevation: 29 m (95 ft)

Population (2017)
  - Total: 270,496
  - Density: 5,372/km^{2} (13,910/sq mi)
- Time zone: UTC-5 (PET)
- UBIGEO: 140101
- Website: www.munichiclayo.gob.pe

Chiclayo District is one of twenty districts of the Chiclayo province in Peru. The district is home to the principal city of Chiclayo.

== See also ==
- Administrative divisions of Peru
