= List of metropolitan areas of Peru =

The following is a list of the most populous Peruvian metropolitan areas with over 300,000 inhabitants.

Note that the populations of metropolitan areas are not city populations but rather a combination of a main large city and many other smaller satellite cities. In Peru, cities with a population of more than 500,000 and with a metropolitan development plan are considered metropolises. As of the 2007 census, these cities are Lima, Arequipa, and Trujillo.

Metropolitan areas of Peru
Rank	Image	Coat of arms	Metropolitan area	Region	1993 population	2007 population	2017 population
1	Lima		Lima Metropolitana Area	Lima	6,321,173	8,472,935	9,569,468
2	Arequipa	Arequipa	Arequipa metropolitan area	Arequipa	640,275	822,479	1,034,736
3	Trujillo		Trujillo metropolitan area	La Libertad	589,314	804,296	962,369
4	Chiclayo		Chiclayo metropolitan area	Lambayeque	550,179	697,861	810,783
5	Piura		Piura metropolitan area	Piura	-	450,363	517,293
6	Iquitos		Iquitos metropolitan area	Loreto	-	-	471,993
7	Cusco		Cusco metropolitan area	Cusco	-	-	434,654
8	Chimbote		Chimbote metropolitan area	Ancash	-	-	381,742
9	Huancayo		Huancayo metropolitan area	Junin	-	-	364,010
Sources: Law of Territorial Demarcation; 1993 population: Lima metropolitan area, Arequipa metropolitan area, Trujillo metropolitan area, - 1993 census (INEI); 2007 population: Lima metropolitan area, Arequipa metropolitan area, Trujillo metropolitan area, Chiclayo metropolitan area - Censo 2007 (INEI); Estimated 2015 population (INEI)

== Composition ==
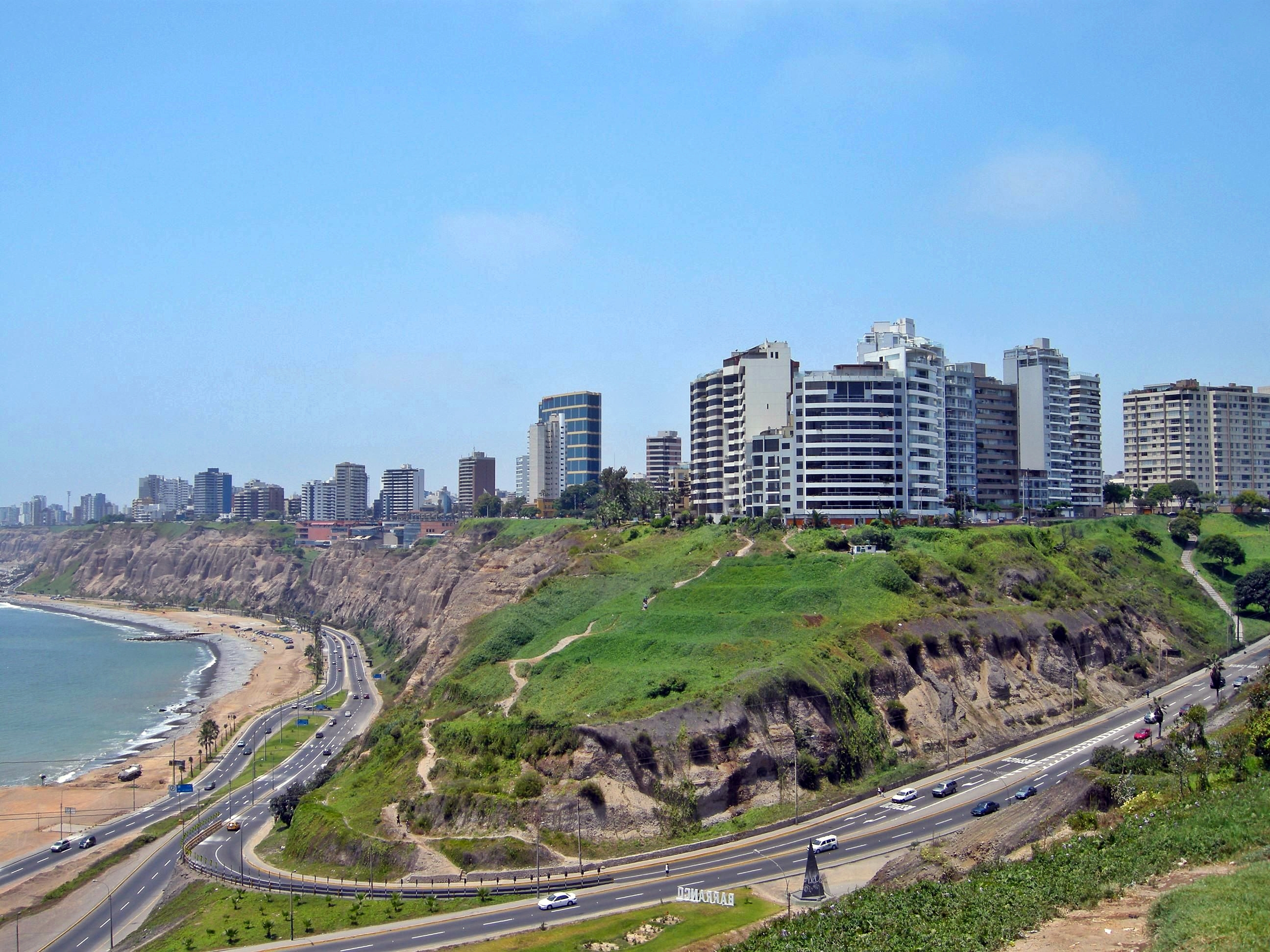
Lima (Peru)

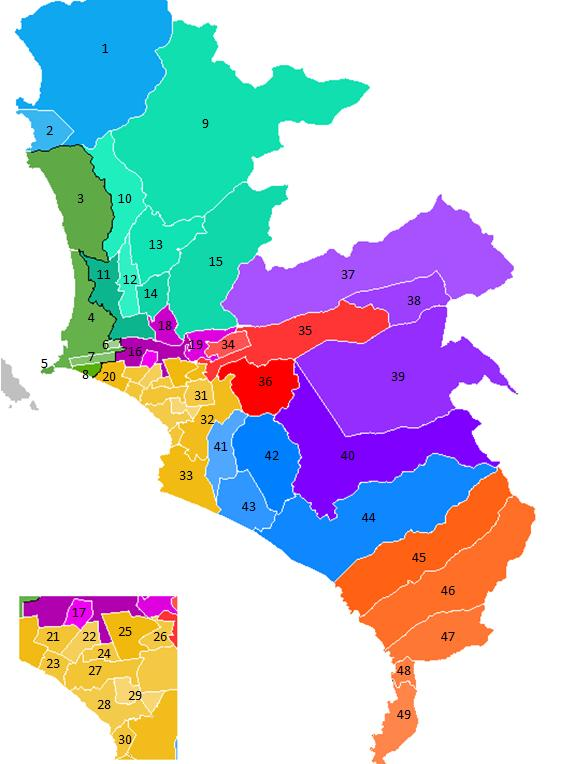
Map of Lima Metropolitan Area

- Lima metropolitan area

Lima metropolitan area is composed of 5 sub regions that group 43 urban districts of Lima Province and 6 districts of Callao Province. These sub regions are the Lima Norte, Lima Sur, Lima Este, Central Lima, and Callao with a total estimated population in 2015 of 9.886.647 people.

- Arequipa Metropolitan Area

Composition	Estimated population 2016	Subdivision
Arequipa	54.905	District
Paucarpata	284.755	District
Cerro Colorado	248.164	District
Cayma	91.802	District
Alto Selva alegre	82.412	District
Socabaya	78.135	District
José Luís Bustamante y Rivero	76.711	District
Mariano Melgar	52.667	District
Miraflores	48.677	District
Jacobo Hunter	48.326	District
Yanahuara	25.483	District
Yura	25.367	District
Sachaca	19.581	District
Tiabaya	14.768	District
Uchumayo	12.436	District
Characato	9.288	District
Sabandia	4.136	District
Mollebaya	1.868	District
Quequeña	1.376	District
Total	1.121.500	--

- Trujillo Metropolitan Area

Composition	Estimated population 2016	Subdivision
Trujillo	314,939	District
El Porvenir	190,461	District
La Esperanza	189,206	District
Víctor Larco Herrera	68,506	District
Huanchaco	68,409	District
Moche	37,436	District
Florencia de Mora	37,262	District
Laredo	37,206	District
Salaverry	18,944	District
Total	962,369	--

- Chiclayo Metropolitan Area

Composition	Estimated population 2016	Subdivision
Chiclayo	291.777	District
Leonardo Ortiz	193.232	District
La Victoria	90.546	District
Lambayeque	77.234	District
Pimentel	44.285	District
Monsefú	31.847	District
Pomalca	25.323	District
San José	16.172	District
Reque	14.942	District
Santa Rosa	12.687	District
Eten	10.571	District
Puerto Eten	2.167	District
Total	810.783	--

- Piura: Piura, Castilla, Catacaos.

Composition	Estimated population 2016	Subdivision
Piura and Veintiséis de Octubre District	301.311	District
Castilla	143.203	District
Catacaos	72.779	District
Total	517.293	--

- Iquitos: Iquitos, Punchana, San Juan Bautista, Belén.

Composition	Estimated population 2016	Subdivision
Iquitos	150.484	District
Belén	75.685	District
Punchana	91.128	District
San Juan Bautista	154.696	District
Total	471.993	--

- Cusco: San Jerónimo, Cusco, Santiago, Wanchaq, San Sebastián.

Composition	Estimated population 2016	Subdivision
Cusco	118.316	District
San Jerónimo	47.101	District
Santiago	90.154	District
Wanchaq	63.778	District
San Sebastián	115.305	District
Total	434.654	--

- Chimbote: Chimbote, Nuevo Chimbote y Coishco.

Composition	Estimated population 2016	Subdivision
Chimbote	214.804	District
Nuevo Chimbote	151.127	District
Coishco	15.811	District
Total	381.742	--

- Huancayo: Huancayo, El Tambo, Chilca.

Composition	Estimated population 2016	Subdivision
Huancayo	116.953	District
El Tambo	161.429	District
Chilca	85.628	District
Total	364.010	--

== See also ==
- List of cities in Peru
- List of regions by population of Peru
- Peru
