= Arequipa metropolitan area =

Arequipa Metropolitan Area
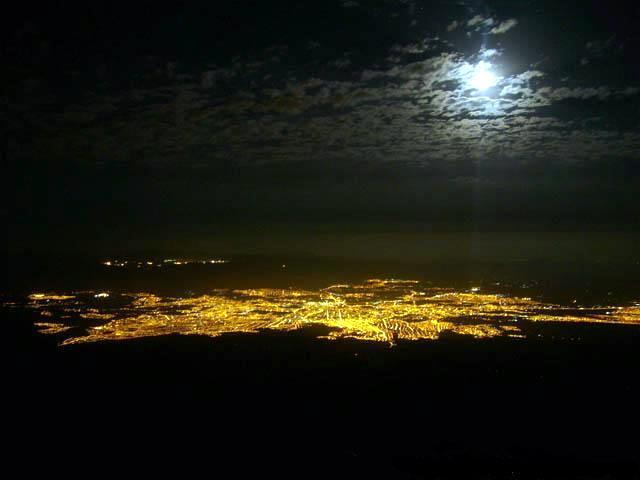
- Aerial view of metropolitan area of Arequipa.
- Country: Peru
- Region: Arequipa
- Province: Arequipa Province

Population (2007 Census)
  - Total: 1,034,736 (2,017)
- Time zone: UTC-5 (PET)

The Arequipa Metropolitan Area is the metropolitan area whose principal city is Arequipa, according to Metropolitan Development Plan of Arequipa According to population statistics of INEI It is the second most populous metropolitan area of Peru in year 2017.

== Population ==
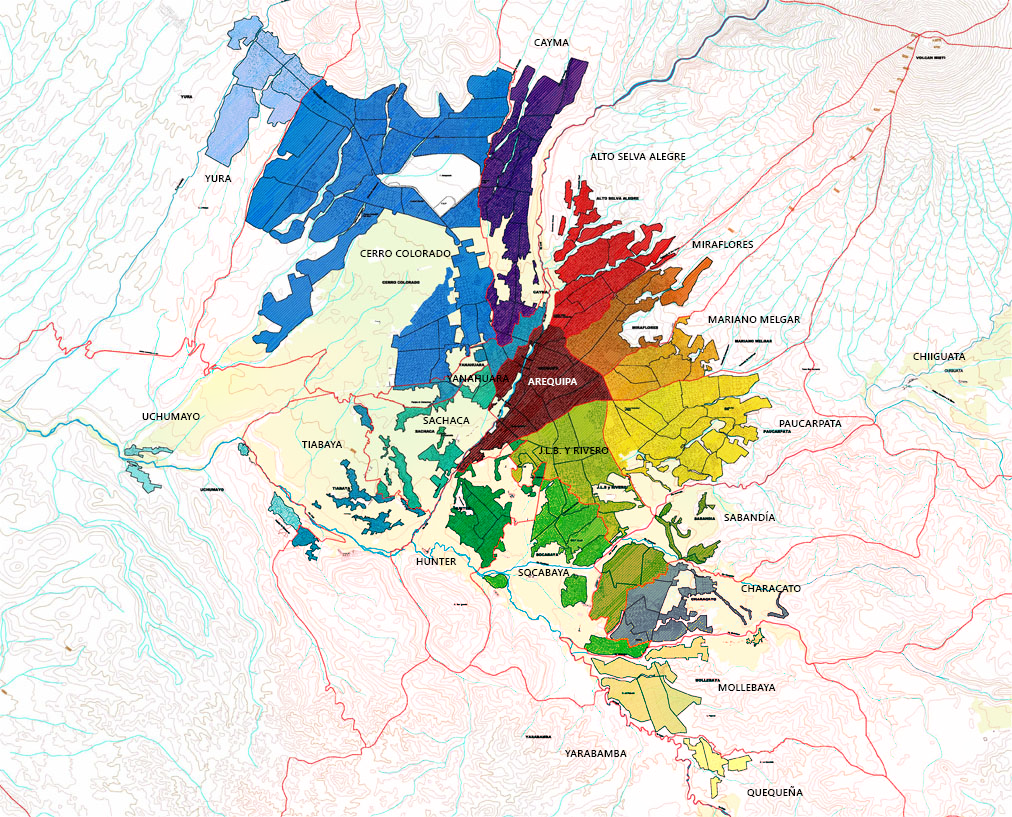
Map of Arequipa metropolitan area

According to INEI the population of Arequipa metropolitan in the year 2007 was of 899.291 people and according to Metropolitan Development Plan of Arequipa for year 2007 this had 822,479 people distributed in its metropolitan districts. According to the census 2007 and estimated population of INEI In the table is shown the population of Arequipa Metropolitan by districts:

Metropolitan districts	Area km²	Dwelling (Census 2007)	Population minor to 1 year	Density (pop./km²)*	Elevation media msl*	Distance to Arequipa (km)	Population Census 2007*	Estimated Population 2015
Alto Selva Alegre	6.98	18,638	1,135	10,414.9	2,500	5	72,696	82,412
Arequipa	12.80	17,062	699	4,811.8	2,335	0	61,591	54,905
Cayma **	246.31	20,267	1,227	303.6	2,403	2	74,776	91,802
Cerro Colorado	174.9	35,805	1,978	647.1	2,406	4	113,171	148,164
Characato	86.0	3,286	96	78.2	2.480	10	6,726	9,288
Jacobo Hunter	20.37	10,543	724	2,262.7	2,268	7	46,092	48,326
José Bustamante	10.83	18,806	1,070	7,055.4	2,310	2	76,410	76,711
Mariano Melgar	29.83	12,843	872	1,748.0	2,385	3	52,144	52,667
Miraflores	28.68	13,133	742	1,767.9	2,430	1	50,704	48,677
Mollebaya	36.6	588	25	38.5	2,483	7	1,410	1,868
Paucarpata	31.7	29,351	1,982	5061.4	2,405	3	160,446	124,755
Quequeña	34.93	-	-	34.9	2,536	-	1,219	1,376
Sabandía	537	1,178	56	6.9	2,220	8	3,699	4,136
Sachaca	36.63	4,806	273	478.8	2,390	4	17,537	19,581
Socabaya	18.64	16,069	853	3,201.2	2,300	3	59,671	78,135
Tiabaya	31.62	3,761	247	464.2	2,178	8	14,677	14,768
Uchumayo	22.14	3,280	175	482.0	1,950	16	10,672	12,436
Yanahuara	2.2	6,626	217	10,404.5	2,390	3	22,890	25,483
Yura	1,942.9	6,179	273	8.1	2,590	28	16,020	25,367
Total	3,311.1	218,938	12,644	260.5	2,335	0	822,479	920,857
*Census 2007 - INEI

=== 2017 Census ===
Metropolitan districts	Surface km²	Altitude msnm	Distance to the Historical Center (km)	Población 2017
Arequipa	12,8	2335	0	55 437
Alto Selva Alegre	6,98	2500	5	85 870
Cayma	246,31	2403	2	91 935
Cerro Colorado	174,9	2406	4	197 954
Characato	86,0	2480	10	12 949
Chiguata	460,81	2946	30	2939
Jacobo Hunter	20,37	2268	7	50 164
José Bustamante	10,83	2310	2	81 829
Mariano Melgar	29,83	2385	3	59 918
Miraflores	28,68	2430	1	60 589
Mollebaya	36,6	2483	7	4756
Paucarpata	31,7	2405	3	131 346
Quequeña	34,93	2536	-	4784
Sabandía	537	2220	8	4368
Sachaca	36,63	2390	4	24 225
Socabaya	18,64	2300	3	75 351
Tiabaya	31,62	2178	8	16 191
Uchumayo	22,14	1950	16	14 054
Yanahuara	2,2	2390	3	25 417
Yarabamba	492,2	2474	-	1314
Yura	1942,9	2590	28	33 346
Total	4264,07	-	-	1 034 736
Datos del XII Censo de Población, VII de Vivienda y III de Comunidades Indígenas 2017

== Graphics of evolution of the population ==
In the following Graphics the evolution of the population of Arequipa metropolitan area.

evolution of the population of Arequipa metropolitan area

Population 1940, 1961, 1972, 1981, 1993, 2007 Population 2015

== See also ==
- Arequipa province
- List of metropolitan areas of Peru
- Peru
