= List of cities in South America =

Map of South America

This is a list of cities in South America.

== Largest cities ==
This list includes the fifty largest cities in South America by population within city limits, based on the most recent official census results, estimates, or short-term projections available for all of these cities, which refer to mid-2020 populations, except for those of Venezuelan cities (2015). The figures do not reflect the populations of urban agglomeration or metropolitan area, which typically do not coincide with the administrative boundaries of the city.

Bold represents largest city in country, Italic represents national capital city.

	Name	Image	Country	Population	Year
1	**São Paulo**		Brazil	11,904,961	2025
2	**Lima**		Peru	10,092,000 (Note: While there is no official administrative definition of the city, it is generally considered to consist of the central 30 of the 43 districts of Lima Province, corresponding to the urban area centered around the historic Cercado de Lima district.)	2023
3	**Bogotá**		Colombia	7,862,277 (Note: Population projections for Colombian cities are that of the cabecera municipal (municipal seat).)	2024
4	Rio de Janeiro		Brazil	6,730,729	2025
5	**Santiago**		Chile	6,657,428	2024
6	**Caracas**		Venezuela	3,289,886 (Note: Population projection is that of the Metropolitan District of Caracas, which comprises the municipalities of Libertador, Chacao, Baruta, Sucre and El Hatillo.)	2015
7	**Buenos Aires**		Argentina	3,121,707	2022
8	Brasília		Brazil	2,996,899	2025
9	Medellín		Colombia	2,657,772	2024
10	**Guayaquil**		Ecuador	2,650,288	2022
11	Fortaleza		Brazil	2,578,483	2025
12	Salvador		Brazil	2,564,204	2025
13	Belo Horizonte		Brazil	2,415,872	2025
14	Manaus		Brazil	2,303,732	2025
15	Cali		Colombia	2,270,293	2024
16	Curitiba		Brazil	1,830,795	2025
17	Quito		Ecuador	1,763,275	2022
18	Maracaibo		Venezuela	1,653,211	2015
19	**Santa Cruz de la Sierra**		Bolivia	1,606,671	2024
20	Recife		Brazil	1,588,376	2025
21	Córdoba		Argentina	1,505,250	2022
22	Goiânia		Brazil	1,503,256	2025
23	Belém		Brazil	1,397,315	2025
24	Porto Alegre		Brazil	1,388,794	2025
25	Guarulhos		Brazil	1,349,100	2025
26	Rosario		Argentina	1,348,725	2022
27	Barranquilla		Colombia	1,341,160	2024
28	**Montevideo**		Uruguay	1,302,954	2023
29	Campinas		Brazil	1,187,974	2025
30	Callao		Peru	1,171,400	2023
31	Arequipa		Peru	1,157,500 (Note: INEI defines the city of Arequipa as comprising the districts of Arequipa, Alto Selva Alegre, Cayma, Cerro Colorado, Jacobo Hunter, Mariano Melgar, Miraflores, Paucarpata, Sabandía, Sachaca, Socabaya, Tiabaya, Yanahuara and José Luis Bustamante y Rivero.)	2023
32	Barquisimeto		Venezuela	1,116,182	2015
33	São Luís		Brazil	1,089,215	2025
34	Trujillo		Peru	1,034,300 (Note: INEI defines the city of Trujillo as comprising the districts of Trujillo, El Porvenir, Florencia de Mora, La Esperanza and Víctor Larco Herrera.)	2023
35	Maceió		Brazil	994,952	2025
36	Campo Grande		Brazil	962,883	2025
37	São Gonçalo		Brazil	960,196	2025
38	Cartagena		Colombia	950,011	2024
39	Teresina		Brazil	905,692	2025
40	Valencia		Venezuela	901,900	2015
41	João Pessoa		Brazil	897,633	2025
42	El Alto		Bolivia	885,035	2024
43	Ciudad Guayana		Venezuela	877,547	2015
44	Duque de Caxias		Brazil	866,225	2025
45	Nova Iguaçu		Brazil	843,220	2025
46	São Bernardo do Campo		Brazil	841,154	2025
47	Natal	Natal, capital do Rio Grande do Norte, Brasil	Brazil	784,249	2025
48	Santo André		Brazil	782,048	2025
49	La Plata		Argentina	768,547	2022
50	La Paz		Bolivia	755,732	2024

== Countries ==
- List of cities in Argentina
- List of cities in Bolivia
- List of cities in Brazil
- List of cities in Chile
- List of cities in Colombia
- List of cities in Ecuador
- List of cities in Guyana
- List of cities in Paraguay
- List of cities in Peru
- List of cities in Suriname
- List of cities in Uruguay
- List of cities in Venezuela

== Territories ==
- List of cities in the Falkland Islands
- List of cities in French Guiana

== See also ==
- List of Latin American cities by population
- Demographics of South America
- Lists of cities
- Cities of present-day nations and states
