= Arequipa (disambiguation) =

Arequipa is a major city in Peru.

Arequipa may also refer to:

Places:

- Arequipa Region, Peru
  - Arequipa Province
    - Arequipa District
- Roman Catholic Archdiocese of Arequipa
- 737 Arequipa, an asteroid

Other uses:

- Arequipa turbatella, a species of moth in the monotypic genus Arequipa
- Arequipa Pottery, California, an Arts and Crafts pottery
- USS Arequipa (AF-31), a stores ship of the United States Navy
- Boyden Observatory, which was located at Arequipa and often referred to as Arequipa
