= Virgin of Chapi =

Marian devotion and pilgrimage site in Polobaya District, Arequipa region, Peru

Blessed Virgin of Chapi: Mamita de Chapi; Our Lady of Candelaria of Chapi; Our Lady of Candlemas of Chapi; Our Lady of Purification of Chapi; Patroness of Arequipa
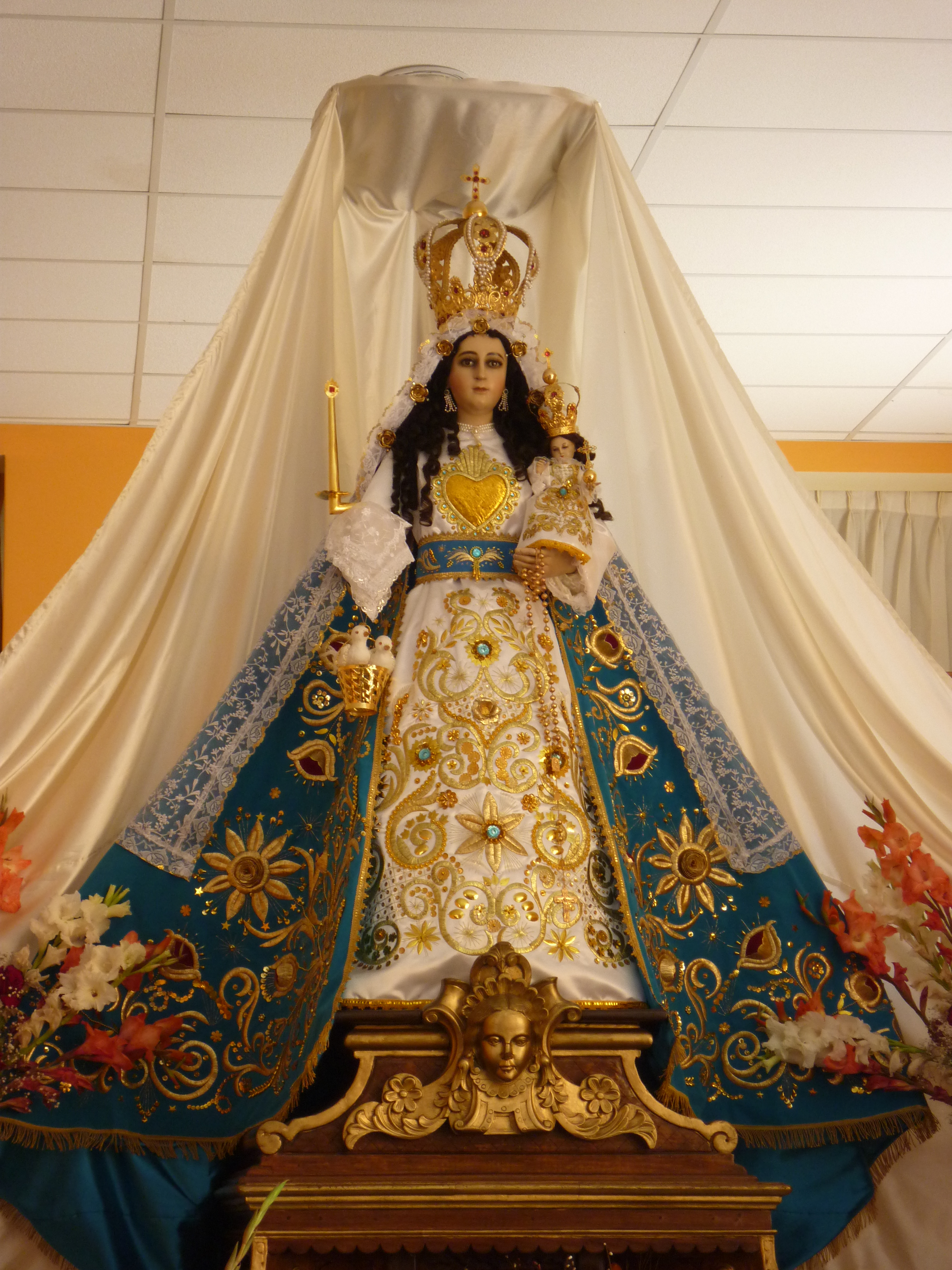
- Type: Marian devotion
- Approval: 2 February 1985 (canonical coronation granted by Pope John Paul II)
- Venerated in: Catholic Church
- Shrine: Sanctuary of Chapi, Polobaya District, Department of Arequipa, Peru
- Patronage: Arequipa (city); Department of Arequipa
- Attributes: Carved wooden head, bust, and hands on a jointed body, standing 1.30 m (4.3 ft) tall; dark chestnut ("trigueño") complexion and dark brown eyes; dressed in an elaborately embroidered tunic set with precious stones and gold thread, and covered with one of some 400 ornamental mantles kept in rotation, one of which bears the coat of arms of Arequipa; crowned with a gold crown and wearing a gold rosary donated by Pope John Paul II in 1985; in some depictions carries the crowned Christ Child on one hand and a small basket with two white dove chicks on the other
- Feast day: 1 May

The Blessed Virgin of Chapi (Spanish: Santísima Virgen de Chapi), formally Our Lady of the Candlemas of Chapi (Spanish: Nuestra Señora de la Candelaria de Chapi) and popularly called "Mamita de Chapi", is a Catholic devotion to the Blessed Virgin Mary as the patron saint of both the city and region of Arequipa, in southern Peru. Her sanctuary stands in the Chapi Valley in Polobaya District, roughly 60 kilometres south of the city of Arequipa, and is one of the most visited Marian shrines in Peru.

== History ==
According to devotional and archival accounts, an image of the Blessed Virgin Mary under the invocation of the Virgin of Candelaria was venerated in the area of Chapi by the 17th or 18th centuries depending on the source, with records of the valley appearing in the repartimiento of Pocsi District by 1655.

Tradition holds that the image was originally kept near Churajón or in the settlement of Accahua before a catastrophic earthquake, associated with the 1600 eruption of Huaynaputina, destroyed the settlement and forced surviving residents to relocate, carrying the image with them. Around 1743, a royal order requiring residents to abandon land needed for irrigation works prompted further relocation of the image into the Chapi valley. Popular accounts from this period also describe a devotee locating a water source near the settlement after praying to the image, an event still cited in local retellings of the shrine's founding.

In 1793, a parish priest reportedly ordered the image moved to the nearby town of Sogay. According to tradition, a sudden storm halted the procession before it could proceed, an event popularly interpreted as the Virgin's wish to remain at Chapi; this episode is commonly cited as the origin of the shrine's name, said to derive from Quechua phrases such as "Ch'aypi, Ch'aypi" ("There, in that place").

An 1868 earthquake buried the original thatched-roof chapel, though the image itself was reportedly undamaged. The sanctuary suffered further damage from a fire on 3 May 1921 and an earthquake eight days later. In 1876, the Archdiocese of Arequipa formally established 1 May as the central feast day for the devotion to the Virgin of Chapi.

On 2 February 1985, Pope John Paul II visited the city of Arequipa to canonically crown the Virgin of Chapi. The field where the coronation took place would eventually become the site of the Estadio Monumental Virgen de Chapi.

The Archbishop of Arequipa, Fernando Vargas Ruiz de Somocurcio issued a decree declaring the shrine an Archdiocesan Sanctuary on 28 April 1986.

The temple built during the 20th century was seriously damaged by the 2001 southern Peru earthquake on 23 June 2001 and subsequently demolished in early 2002; a reconstruction commission was formed by the Archdiocese in 2003.

On 4 October 2012, the Peruvian Ministry of Culture designated "the Festivity of the Blessed Virgin of the Candelaria of Chapi, Arequipa" (la Festividad de la Santísima Virgen de la Candelaria de Chapi, Arequipa) as Cultural Heritage of the Nation.

== Sanctuary and pilgrimage ==
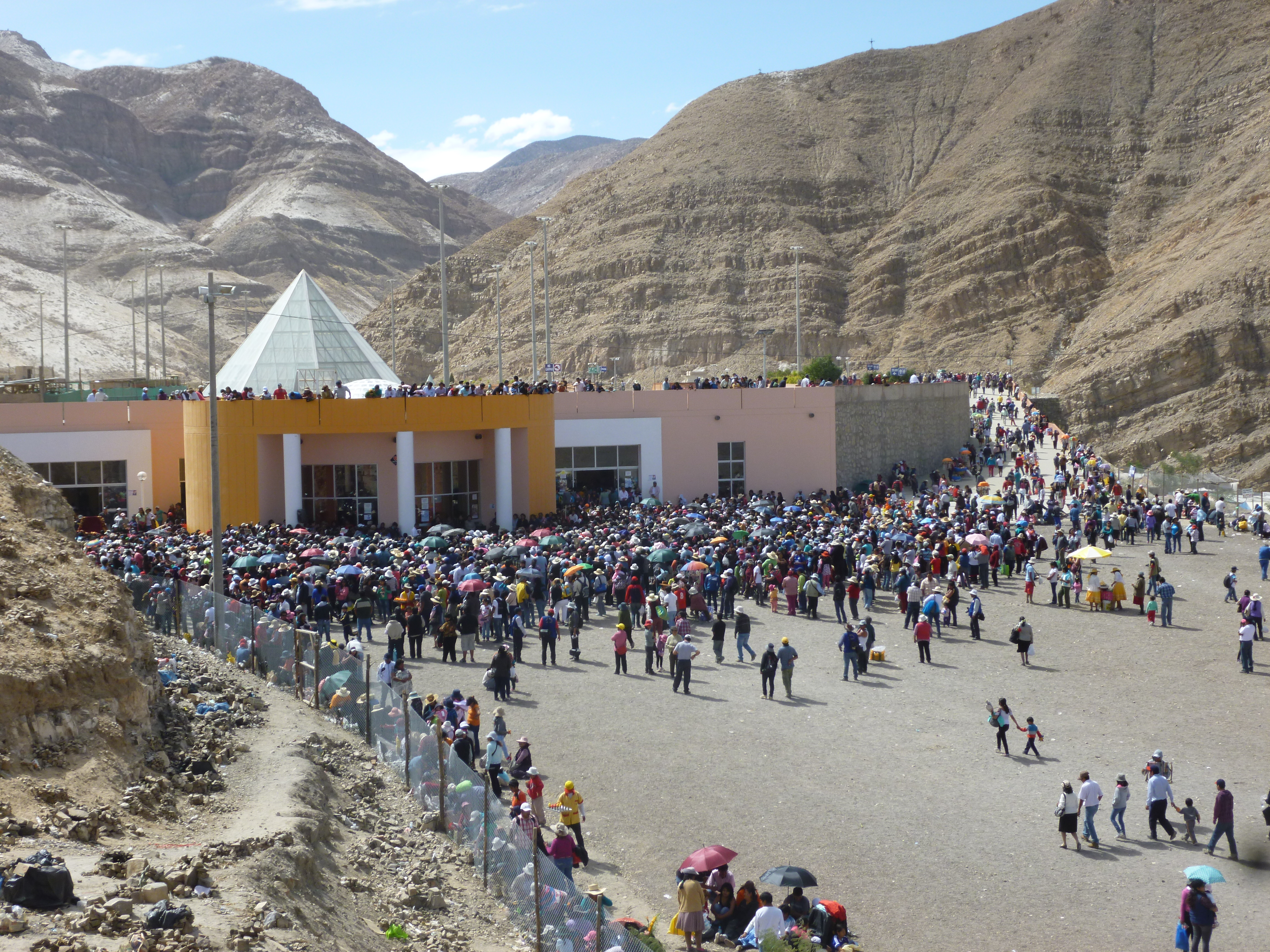
Exterior view of the Sanctuary of Chapi

The Sanctuary of Chapi sits at approximately 2,420 metres above sea level in a desert setting in Polobaya District. Each year between 29 April and 2 May, the sanctuary draws an estimated 250,000 pilgrims, with many walking through the night to reach the shrine. On the central feast day of 1 May, the statue is carried in a procession lasting about ninety minutes following Mass, and pilgrims traditionally leave ex-votos in gratitude for favours attributed to the Virgin.

== See also ==
- Estadio Monumental Virgen de Chapi
- List of canonically crowned images
- Catholic Church in Peru
  - Lord of Miracles, Lima
- Virgin of Candelaria

== Bibliography ==
- Love, Thomas F. (2017). The Independent Republic of Arequipa: making regional culture in the Andes (1st ed.). Austin (Texas): University of Texas Press. ISBN 9781477314616.
- Málaga Núñez-Zeballos, Alejandro (2011). La Virgen de Arequipa. Historia de la milagrosa Virgen de Chapi [The Virgin of Arequipa: History of the Miraculous Virgin of Chapi] (in Spanish). Arequipa: Universidad Católica de Santa María.
- Santoro, Nicholas Joseph (2011). Mary in Our Life: Atlas of the Names and Titles of Mary, the Mother of Jesus, and Their Place in Marian Devotion. Kansas City: iUniverse. ISBN 9781462040223.
