= Melgar =

Melgar may refer to:

== Places and locations ==
=== Colombia ===
- Melgar, Tolima

=== Peru ===
- Melgar Province
- Mariano Melgar District

=== Spain ===
- Melgar de Abajo
- Melgar de Fernamental

== People ==
- Mariano Melgar (1791–1815), Peruvian poet
- Francisco Melgar (1849–1926), Spanish politician
- John Melgar Smith (1872–1947), American businessman and politician
- Rafael Lapesa Melgar (1908–2001), Spanish philologist
- José Milton Melgar (born 1959), retired professional Bolivian football player
- Fernand Melgar (born 1961), Swiss film director and actor

== Sports ==
- FBC Melgar
