= Añaswayq'u =

Coordinates: 16°24′45″S 71°39′21″W

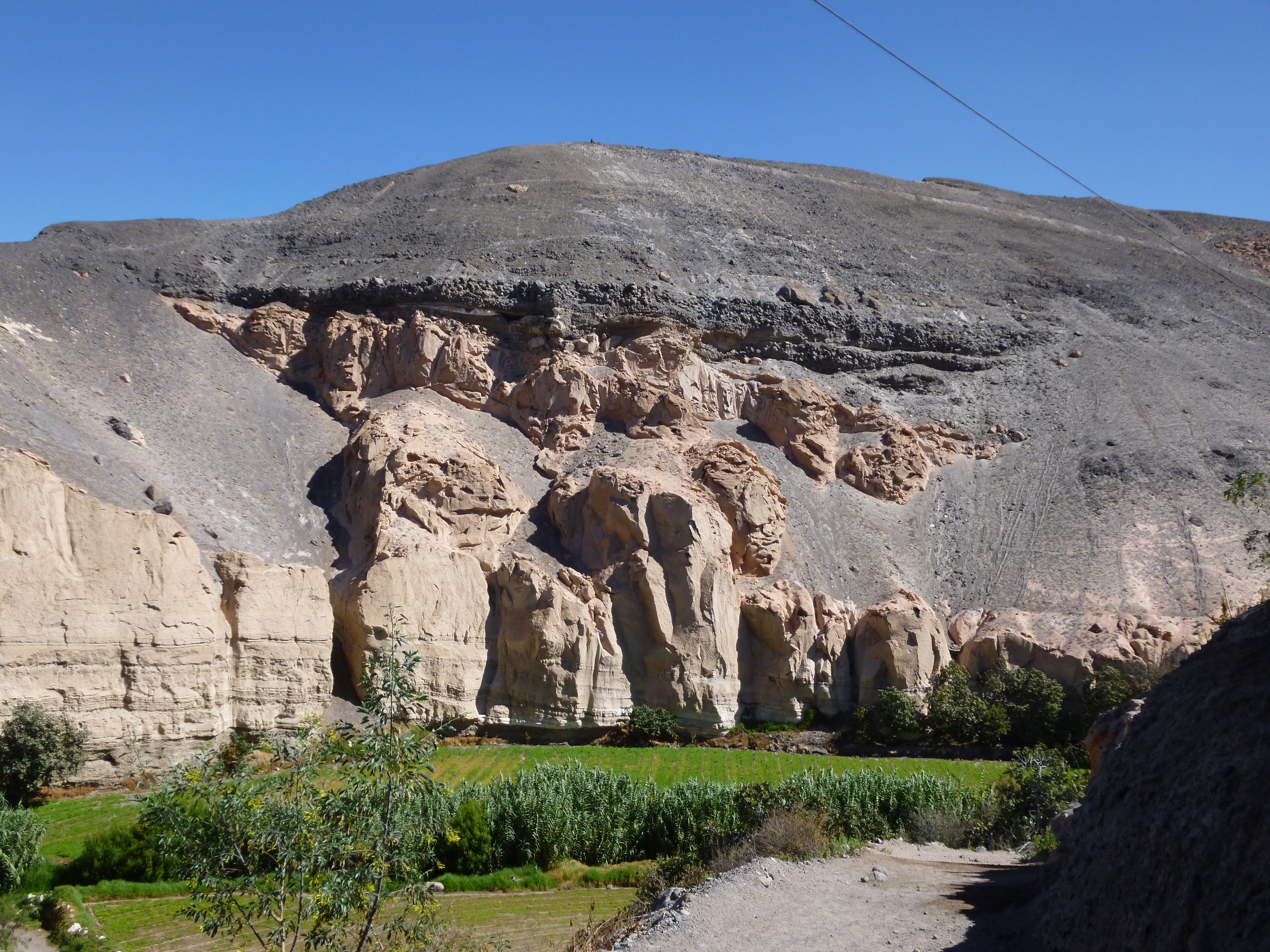
Añaswayq'u

Añaswayq'u (Quechua añas skunk, wayq'u valley, "skunk valley", hispanicized spelling Añashuayco) is a valley in the Arequipa Region in Peru, northwest of the city of Arequipa. It lies in the districts Cerro Colorado and Uchumayo of the Arequipa Province, northeast of Uchumayo. The valley contains volcanic stone, white ignimbrite (sillar), which has been used for religious and civil buildings of Arequipa since colonial times.

Añaswayq'u is also the name of a village in the valley and the name of the stream which flows through the gorge. It originates at the confluence of three streams near the bridge of Añaswayq'u and near Rodríguez Ballón International Airport. The stream is a tributary of the Chili River. It meets the river at the toll post near Uchumayo.

== IUGS geological heritage site ==
In respect of it being 'the global type locality for 'Sillar' vapor phase ignimbrite, formed by a large explosive eruption 1.65Ma ago', the International Union of Geological Sciences (IUGS) included 'The vapor phase ignimbrites of Sillar in the Añashuayco Quarries of Arequipa' in its assemblage of 100 'geological heritage sites' around the world in a listing published in October 2022. The organisation defines an IUGS Geological Heritage Site as 'a key place with geological elements and/or processes of international scientific relevance, used as a reference, and/or with a substantial contribution to the development of geological sciences through history.'
