= Santa Rita de Siguas District =

Coordinates: 16°29′35″S 72°11′20″W

Santa Rita de Siguas Santa Rita Siwas
- District
- Coat of arms
- Interactive map of Santa Rita de Siguas
- Country: Peru
- Region: Arequipa
- Province: Arequipa
- Capital: Santa Rita de Siguas

Government
  - Mayor: Rufo Demetrio Minaya Contreras

Area
  - Total: 370.16 km^{2} (142.92 sq mi)
- Elevation: 1,268 m (4,160 ft)

Population (2005 census)
  - Total: 4,393
  - Density: 11.87/km^{2} (30.74/sq mi)
- Time zone: UTC-5 (PET)
- UBIGEO: 040121
- Website: munisantarita.gob.pe

Santa Rita de Siguas District is one of the twenty-nine districts of the Arequipa Province in Peru.
