= Yarabamba District =

Coordinates: 16°32′49″S 71°28′37″W

Yarabamba Yarapampa
- District
- Interactive map of Yarabamba
- Country: Peru
- Region: Arequipa
- Province: Arequipa
- Founded: January 25, 1943
- Capital: Yarabamba

Government
  - Mayor: Celia Fredesminda Torres Valdivia

Area
  - Total: 492.2 km^{2} (190.0 sq mi)
- Elevation: 2,460 m (8,070 ft)

Population (2005 census)
  - Total: 1,245
  - Density: 2.529/km^{2} (6.551/sq mi)
- Time zone: UTC-5 (PET)
- UBIGEO: 040127

Yarabamba District is one of twenty-nine districts of the province Arequipa in Peru.
