= Polobaya District =

Coordinates: 16°33′54″S 71°22′08″W

Polobaya Puluwaya
- District
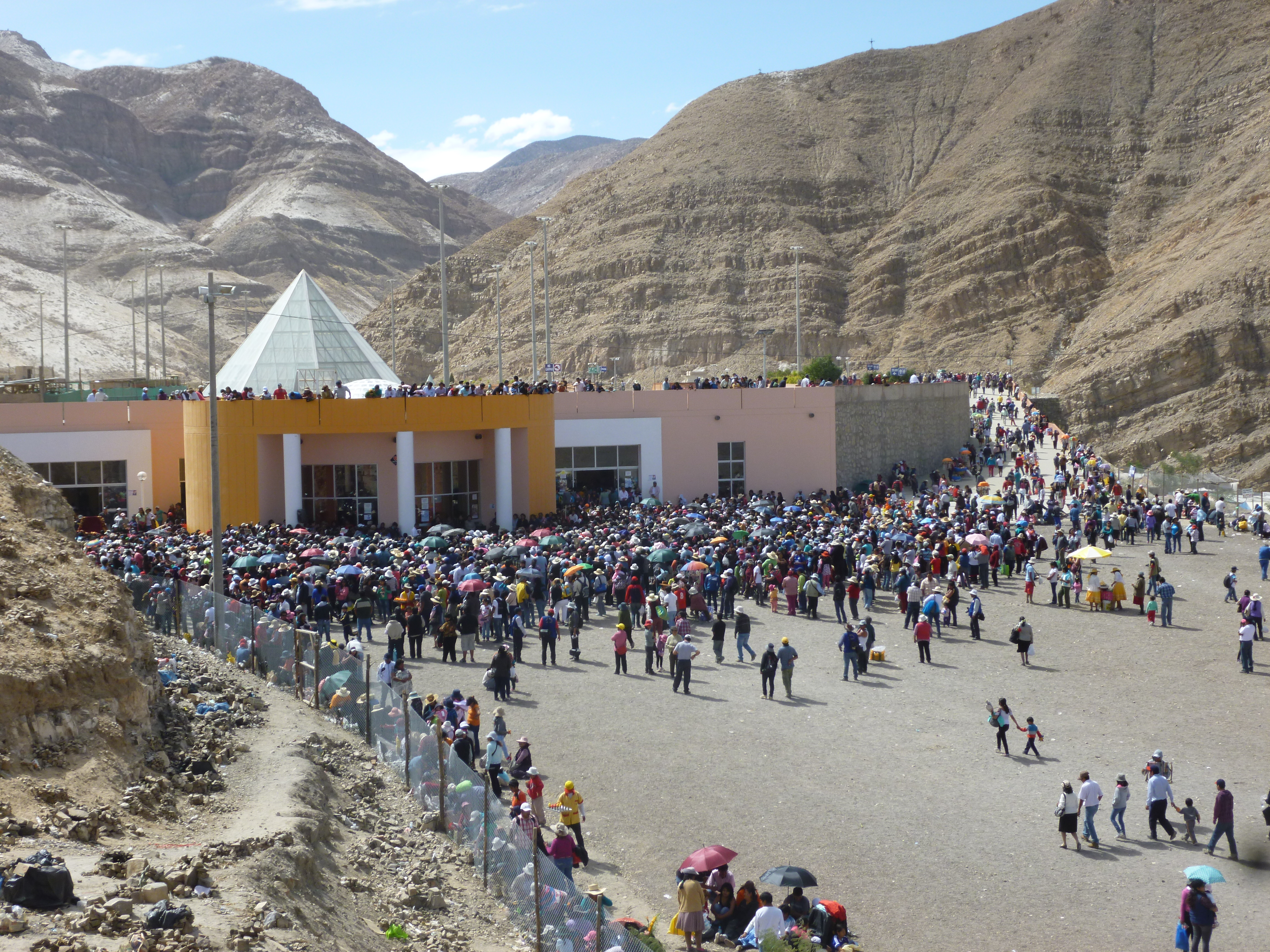
- Sanctuary of Chapi in the Polobaya District
- Interactive map of Polobaya
- Country: Peru
- Region: Arequipa
- Province: Arequipa
- Founded: May 27, 1952
- Capital: Polobaya Grande

Government
  - Mayor: Luis Gonzalo Gonzales Adrian

Area
  - Total: 441.61 km^{2} (170.51 sq mi)
- Elevation: 3,091 m (10,141 ft)

Population (2005 census)
  - Total: 1,285
  - Density: 2.910/km^{2} (7.536/sq mi)
- Time zone: UTC-5 (PET)
- UBIGEO: 040114

Polobaya District is one of twenty-nine districts of the province Arequipa in Peru. The village of Chapi with the sanctuary of Our Lady of Chapi is located in this district.
