= Yurac Apacheta (Arequipa) =

Mountain in Peru

- Location within Peru

Highest point
- Elevation: 4,200 m (13,800 ft)
- Coordinates: 15°59′20″S 71°43′29″W

Geography
- Location: Peru, Arequipa Region, Arequipa Province, Caylloma Province
- Parent range: Andes

Yurac Apacheta (possibly from Quechua yuraq white, Aymara apachita the place of transit of an important pass in the principal routes of the Andes; name for a stone cairn in the Andes, a little pile of rocks built along the trail in the high mountains) is a mountain in the Andes of Peru, about 4,200 metres (13,780 ft) high. It is situated in the Arequipa Region, Arequipa Province, Yura District, and in the Caylloma Province, Huanca District.
