= Santa Isabel de Siguas District =

Coordinates: 16°19′16″S 72°06′04″W

Santa Isabel de Siguas
- District
- Interactive map of Santa Isabel de Siguas
- Country: Peru
- Region: Arequipa
- Province: Arequipa
- Capital: Santa Isabel de Siguas

Government
  - Mayor: Herminio Pacheco Mena

Area
  - Total: 187.98 km^{2} (72.58 sq mi)
- Elevation: 1,360 m (4,460 ft)

Population (2005 census)
  - Total: 990
  - Density: 5.3/km^{2} (14/sq mi)
- Time zone: UTC-5 (PET)
- UBIGEO: 040120

Santa Isabel de Siguas District is one of twenty-nine districts of the province Arequipa in Peru.
