= San Juan de Siguas District =

Coordinates: 16°24′25″S 72°09′58″W

San Juan de Siguas San Juan Siwas
- District
- Interactive map of San Juan de Siguas
- Country: Peru
- Region: Arequipa
- Province: Arequipa
- Founded: January 2, 1857
- Capital: San Juan de Siguas

Government
  - Mayor: Jesús Alberto Giraldo Del Pratt

Area
  - Total: 93.31 km^{2} (36.03 sq mi)
- Elevation: 1,152 m (3,780 ft)

Population (2005 census)
  - Total: 1,633
  - Density: 17.50/km^{2} (45.33/sq mi)
- Time zone: UTC-5 (PET)
- UBIGEO: 040118

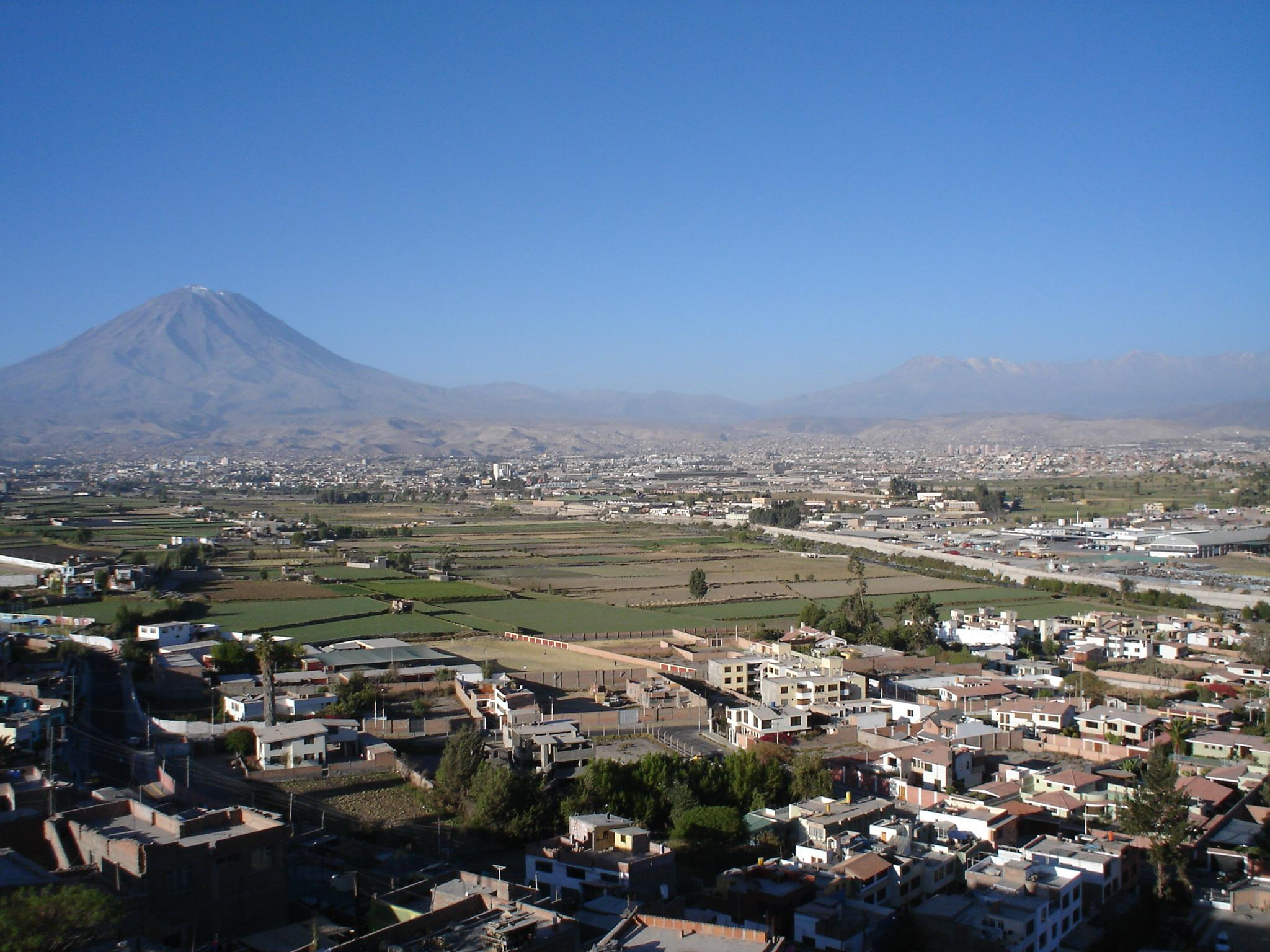

San Juan de Siguas District is one of twenty-nine districts of the province Arequipa in Peru.
