= Waqullani =

Mountain in Peru

- Location within Peru

Highest point
- Elevation: 5,290.1 m (17,356 ft)
- Coordinates: 15°56′3″S 71°30′53″W

Geography
- Location: Peru, Arequipa Region, Arequipa Province
- Parent range: Andes

Waqullani (Aymara waqulla pitcher, jug, -ni a suffix to indicate ownership, "the one with a jug", Hispanicized spelling Huacullani) is a mountain in the Andes of Peru, about 5,290.1 metres (17,356 ft) high. It is situated in the Arequipa Region, Arequipa Province, Yura District, at the border with the Caylloma Province, Yanque District.
