= Arequipa province =

Coordinates: 16.398822°S 71.536883°W

Arequipa
- Province
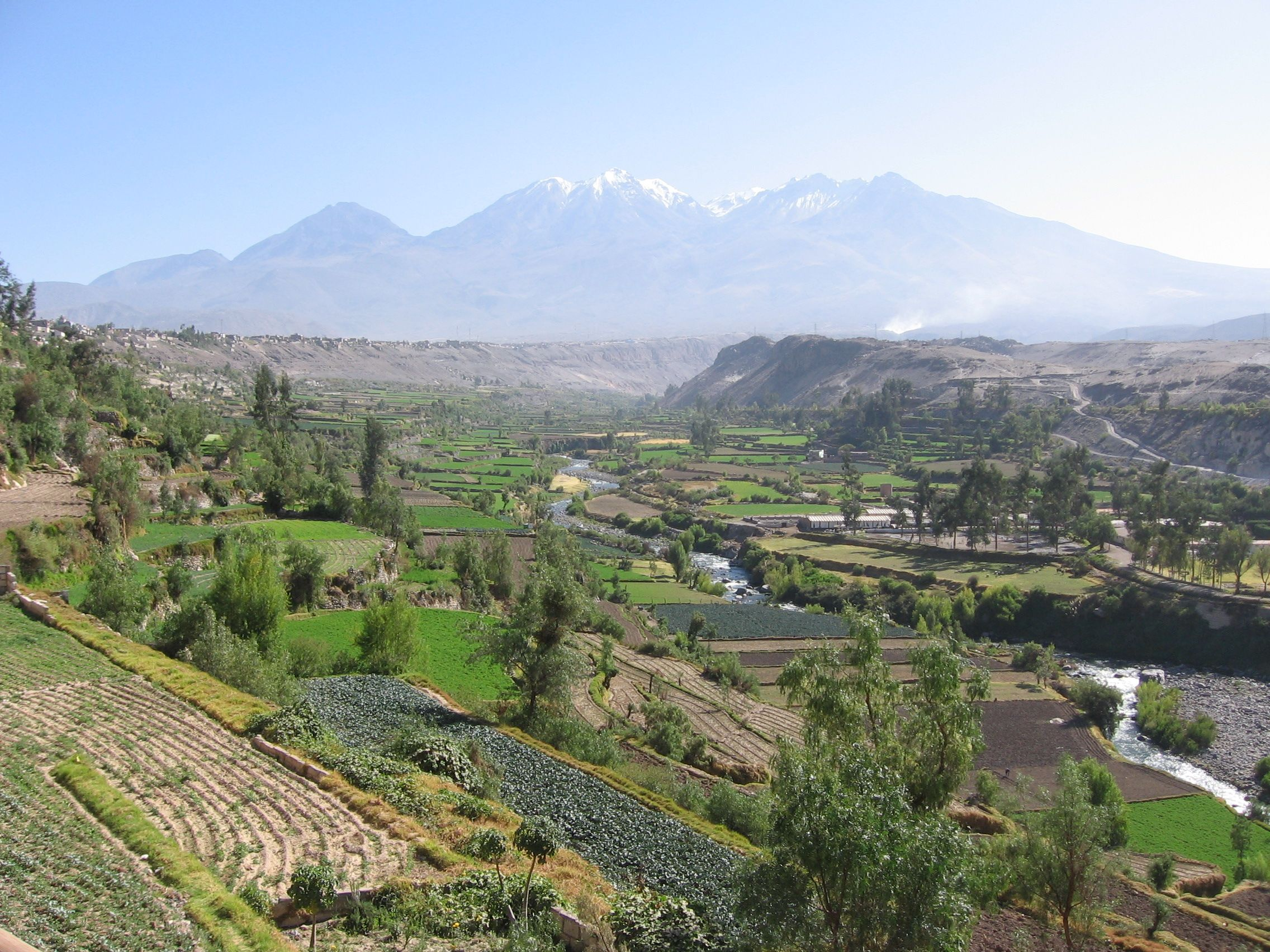
- Chachani as seen from Carmen Alto, province of Arequipa

- Flag Coat of arms

- Location of Arequipa in the Arequipa Region
- Country: Peru
- Region: Arequipa
- Founded: 1540
- Capital: Arequipa

Government
  - Mayor: Ruccy Judith Oscco Polar

Area
  - Total: 9,682.02 km^{2} (3,738.25 sq mi)

Population (Census 2017)
  - Total: 1,080,635
  - Density: 111.613/km^{2} (289.075/sq mi)
- UBIGEO: 0401
- Website: www.muniarequipa.gob.pe

Arequipa is a province in the Arequipa Region, Peru. Its capital, Arequipa, is Peru's second most populous city. It borders the provinces of Islay, Camaná, and Caylloma. According to INEI, in the year 2017 it had a population of 1,080,635 people.

== Geography ==
Some of the highest peaks of the province are Chachani, the Misti volcano and Pichu Pichu. Other mountains are listed below:

- Anta Q'awa
- Anta Saya
- Chachakumani
- Iru Qullu
- Janq'u Apachita
- Jayuni
- Jichu Qullu
- Kunturi
- Kunturini
- Llallawi
- Llallawani
- Misa Misani
- Misa Pilluni
- Ñuñu Muqu
- Pachakutiq
- Parwayuni
- Pilluni
- Pirwani
- Puka Muqu
- Puka Pukayuq
- Pukara
- Puka Saya
- Phichunchäni
- Qillqata
- Qiñwani
- Qiwlla Pununa
- Qullpani
- Qullqirani
- Saywa
- Saywani
- Sinqa
- Sura Wañusqa
- Suri Wasi
- Takuni
- Turini
- Wankarani
- Wanq'uni
- Waqullani
- Wayllani
- Wila Muqu
- Wila Wila
- Wilani
- Yuraq Pilluni
- Yuraq Apachita
- Yuraq Urqu

The Sambay caves are located in the district of Arequipa, in mountains on the route connecting Arequipa city with the Colca Canyon.

== Political division ==
The province is divided into twenty-nine districts (Spanish: distritos, singular: distrito).

- Alto Selva Alegre
- Arequipa
- Cayma
- Cerro Colorado
- Characato
- Chiguata
- Jacobo Hunter
- José Luis Bustamante
- La Joya
- Mariano Melgar
- Miraflores
- Mollebaya
- Paucarpata
- Pocsi
- Polobaya
- Quequeña
- Sabandía
- Sachaca
- San Juan de Siguas
- San Juan de Tarucani
- Santa Isabel de Siguas
- Santa Rita de Siguas
- Socobaya
- Tiabaya
- Uchumayo
- Vitor
- Yanahuara
- Yarabamba
- Yura

== Ethnic groups ==
The province is mainly inhabited by Mestizos of Spanish and Indigenous American ancestry. Spanish, is the language which the majority of the population (85.67%) learnt to speak in childhood, 12.35% of the residents started speaking using the Quechua language and 1.64% using the Aymara language (2007 Peru Census). <refinei.gob.pe INEI, Peru, Censos Nacionales 2007</ref>

== See also ==
- Añaswayq'u
- Arequipa metropolitan area
- Chinaqucha
- History of Peru
- Spanish conquest of Peru
- Urququcha
