= Pocsi District =

Coordinates: 16°30′58″S 71°23′17″W

Pocsi
- District
- Interactive map of Pocsi
- Country: Peru
- Region: Arequipa
- Province: Arequipa
- Capital: Pocsi

Government
  - Mayor: Diego Avila

Area
  - Total: 172.48 km^{2} (66.59 sq mi)
- Elevation: 3,047 m (9,997 ft)

Population (2005 census)
  - Total: 588
  - Density: 3.41/km^{2} (8.83/sq mi)
- Time zone: UTC-5 (PET)
- UBIGEO: 040113

Pocsi District is one of twenty-nine districts of the province of Arequipa in Peru.
