= Arequipa turbatella =

Scientific classification
- Domain: Eukaryota
- Kingdom: Animalia
- Phylum: Arthropoda
- Class: Insecta
- Order: Lepidoptera
- Family: Crambidae
- Subfamily: Crambinae
- Tribe: Crambini
- Genus: Arequipa; Walker, 1863
- Species: A. turbatella

Binomial name
- Arequipa turbatella Walker, 1863

Synonyms
- Crambus bipunctellus Zeller, 1863

Genus of moths

Arequipa is a genus of moths of the family Crambidae. It contains only one species, Arequipa turbatella, which is found in North America, where it has been recorded from Alabama, Illinois, Maine, Maryland, North Carolina, Ohio, Ontario, Pennsylvania, Quebec and West Virginia.

The wingspan is 22–25 mm. The forewings are snow white with two dark brown dots at the end of the cell and one or two dots below the outer fourth of the cell. The hindwings are snow white. Adults are on wing from June to August.
