= Uchumayo District =

Coordinates: 16°24′55″S 71°39′49″W

Uchumayo Uchumayu
- District
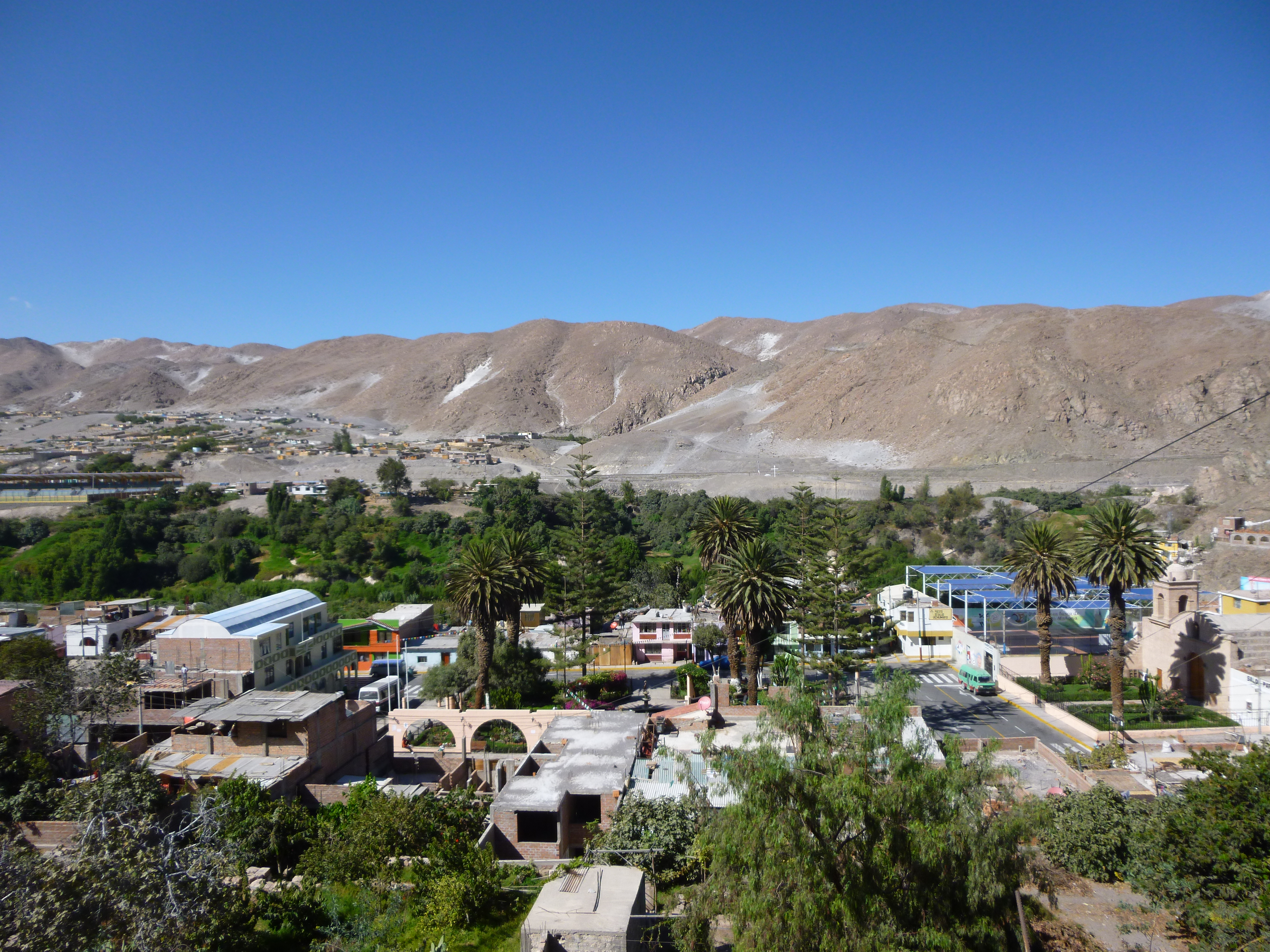
- Uchumayo
- Interactive map of Uchumayo
- Country: Peru
- Region: Arequipa
- Province: Arequipa
- Capital: Uchumayo

Government
  - Mayor: Antonio Hernan Alegre Manrique

Area
  - Total: 227.14 km^{2} (87.70 sq mi)
- Elevation: 1,950 m (6,400 ft)

Population (2005 census)
  - Total: 10,255
  - Density: 45.148/km^{2} (116.93/sq mi)
- Time zone: UTC-5 (PET)
- UBIGEO: 040124

Uchumayo or Uchumayu (Quechua uchu capsicum, mayu river) is one of twenty-nine districts of the province Arequipa in Peru.

== See also ==
- Añaswayq'u
