= Quequeña District =

Coordinates: 16°33′29″S 71°27′04″W

Quequeña Qiqiña
- District
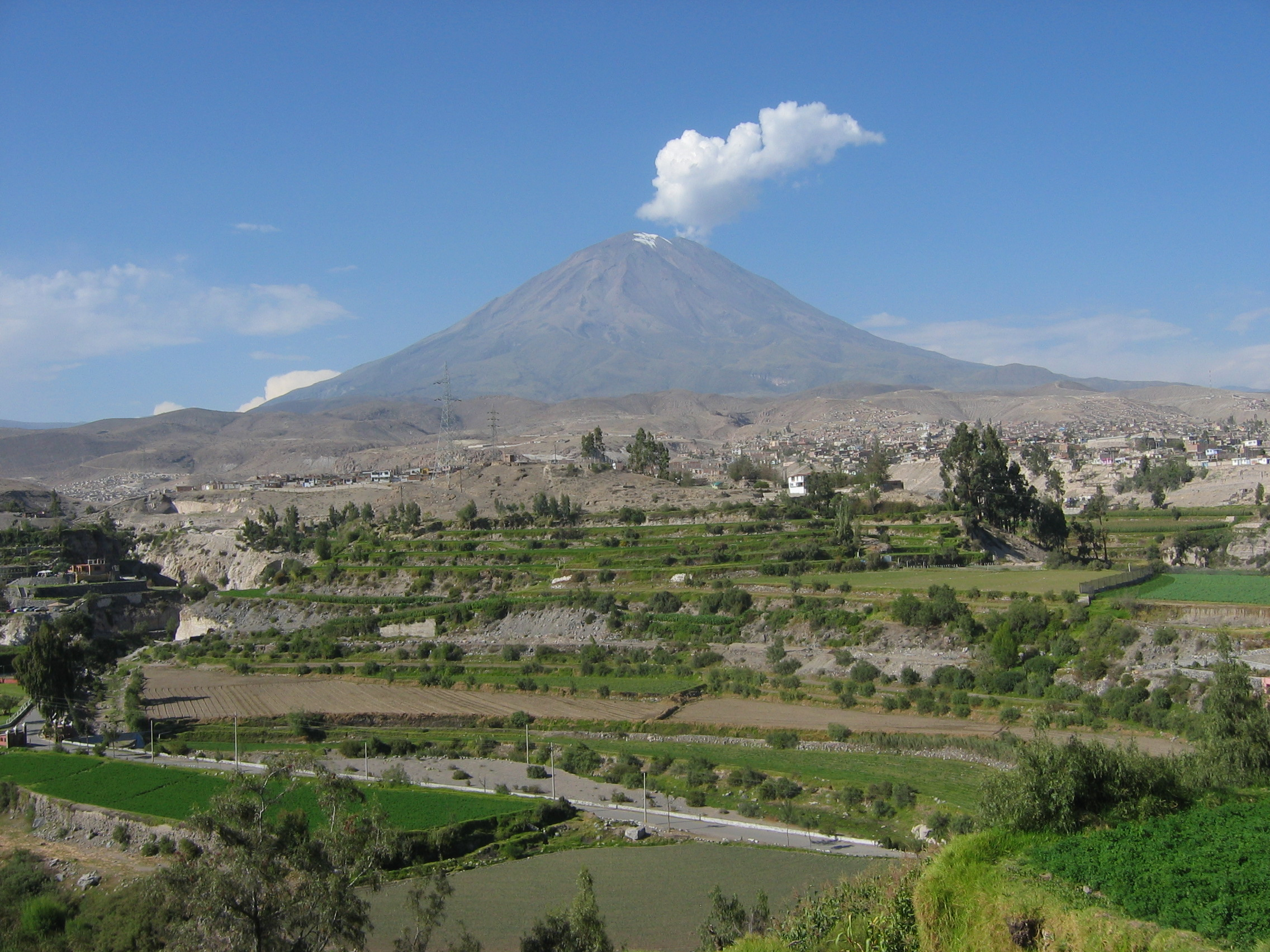
- Quequeña District
- Interactive map of Quequeña
- Country: Peru
- Region: Arequipa
- Province: Arequipa
- Capital: Quequeña

Government
  - Mayor: Julio Leonidas Rodriguez Castillo

Area
  - Total: 34.93 km^{2} (13.49 sq mi)
- Elevation: 2,550 m (8,370 ft)

Population (2005 census)
  - Total: 774
  - Density: 22.2/km^{2} (57.4/sq mi)
- Time zone: UTC-5 (PET)
- UBIGEO: 040115

Quequeña District is one of twenty-nine districts of the province of Arequipa in Peru.
