= Mollebaya District =

Coordinates: 16°28′59″S 71°27′00″W

Mollebaya Mulliwaya
- District
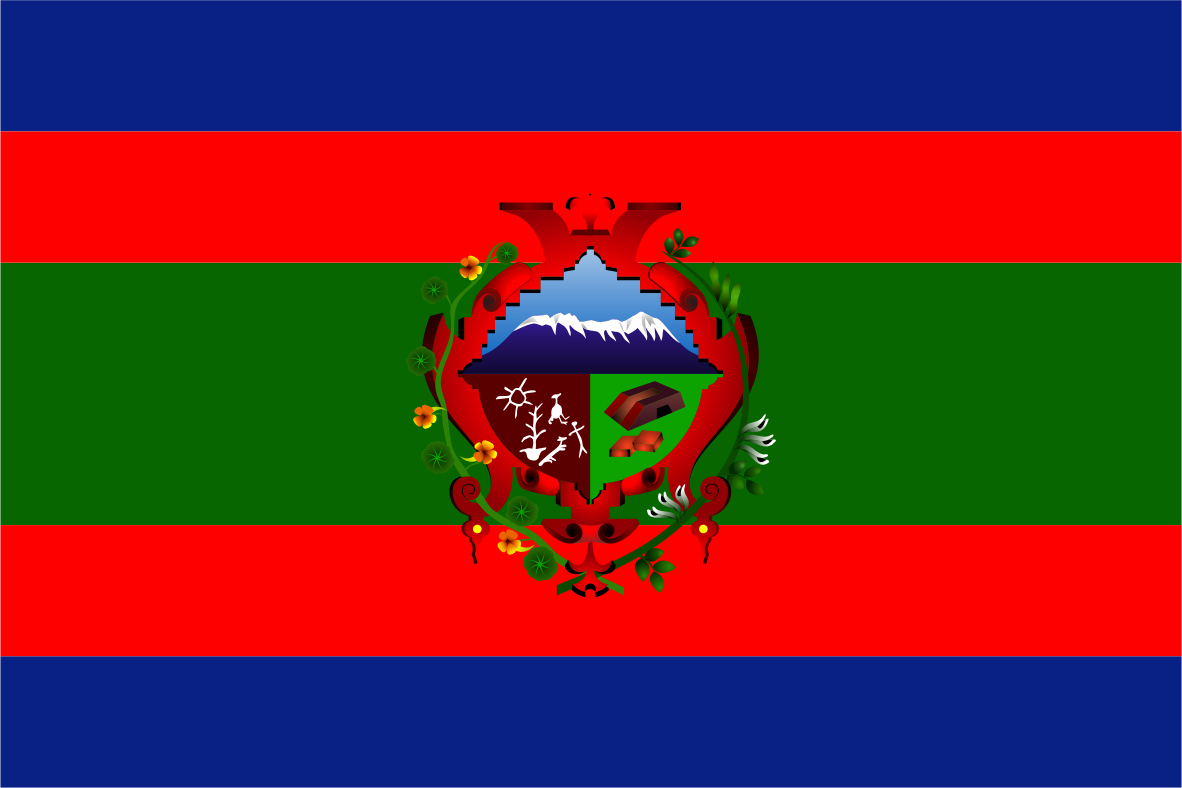
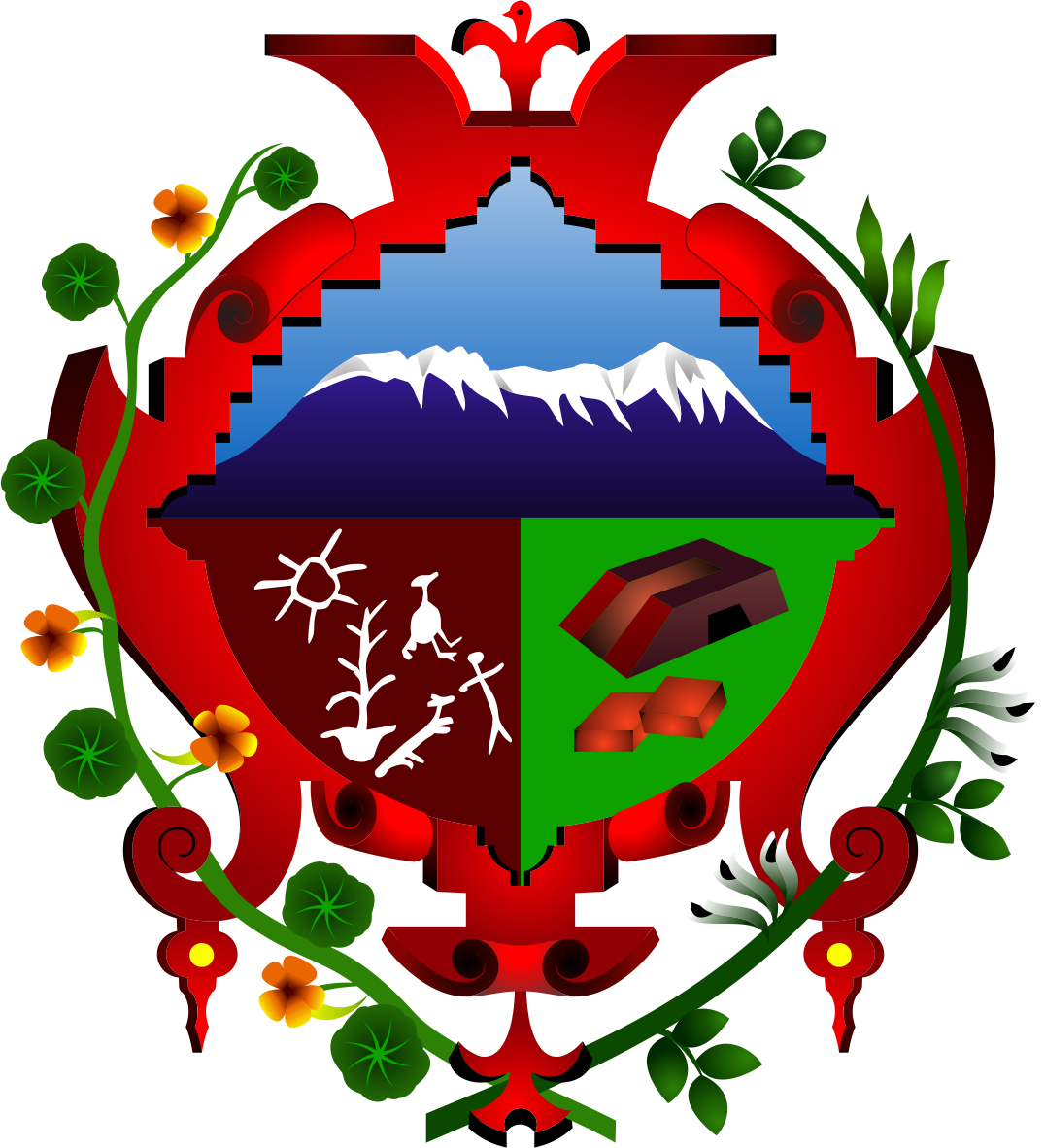
- Flag Coat of arms
- Interactive map of Mollebaya
- Country: Peru
- Region: Arequipa
- Province: Arequipa
- Founded: May 27, 1952
- Capital: Mollebaya

Government
  - Mayor: Tito Edilberto Zegarra Lajo

Area
  - Total: 26.7 km^{2} (10.3 sq mi)
- Elevation: 2,483 m (8,146 ft)

Population (2005 census)
  - Total: 978
  - Density: 36.6/km^{2} (94.9/sq mi)
- Time zone: UTC-5 (PET)
- UBIGEO: 040111

Mollebaya District is one of twenty-nine districts of the province Arequipa in Peru.
