= Yura District =

District of Peru

Coordinates: 16°15′04″S 71°40′52″W

Yura
- District
- Interactive map of Yura
- Country: Peru
- Region: Arequipa
- Province: Arequipa
- Capital: Yura

Government
  - Mayor: Eleuterio León Sergio Ordoñez Yucra

Area
  - Total: 1,942.9 km^{2} (750.2 sq mi)
- Elevation: 2,590 m (8,500 ft)

Population (2005 census)
  - Total: 15,659
  - Density: 8.0596/km^{2} (20.874/sq mi)
- Time zone: UTC-5 (PET)
- UBIGEO: 040128

Yura District is one of twenty-nine districts of the Arequipa Province in Peru.

== History ==
The district's church, San Andrés de Yura Viejo, dates back to before 1746. It is named after Saint Andrew, the district's patron saint.

== Geography ==
The highest peaks of the district is Ampato (Jamp'atu) at 5,290 m (17,360 ft). Other mountains are listed below:

- Anqas
- Hatun P'ukru
- Janq'u Apachita
- Jichu Qullu
- Khunurani
- Misa Misani
- Pata Qucha
- Pilluni
- P'isaq
- Q'iwiri
- Q'ulini
- Sillani
- T'akra
- Urquña
- Wallwani
- Waqullani
- Wayllas
- Wilawi
- Yana Qutu
- Yana Urqu
- Yuraq Apachita
