= Characato District =

District of Arequipa, Peru

Characato
- District
- Location within Peru
- Coordinates: 16°29′36″S 71°29′34″W
- Country: Peru
- Department: Arequipa
- Provinces: Arequipa

Area
  - Total: 86.11 km^{2} (33.25 sq mi)
- Elevation: 3,505 m (11,499 ft)

Population (2022)
  - Total: 17,706
  - Density: 205.6/km^{2} (532.6/sq mi)
- Time zone: UTC-5 (PET)

Characato is a district of Arequipa Province, Peru. It is located to the southeast of Arequipa, at an average elevation of 3,505 meters above the sea level. As of the year 2022, it had a population of 17,706.

== See also ==
- Arequipa
- Peru
