= Alto Selva Alegre District =

Alto Selva Alegre Hanan Kusisach'a
- District
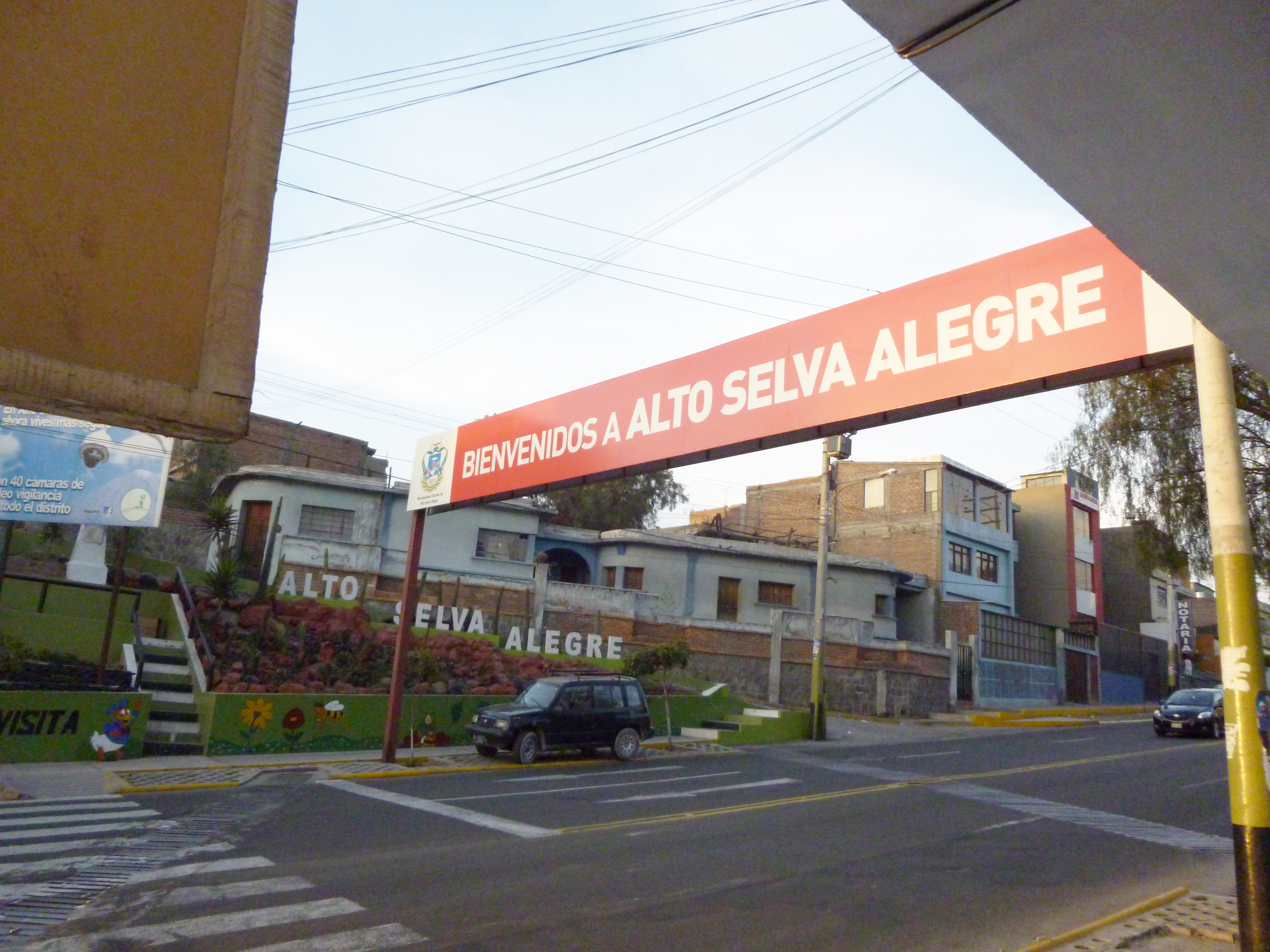
- Alto Selva Alegre District
- Interactive map of Alto Selva Alegre
- Coordinates: 16°22′44.05″S 71°31′14.29″W
- Country: Peru
- Region: Arequipa
- Province: Arequipa
- Founded: November 16, 1992
- Capital: Selva Alegre

Government
  - Mayor: Jesús Antonio Gamero Marquez

Area
  - Total: 6.98 km^{2} (2.69 sq mi)
- Elevation: 2,500 m (8,200 ft)

Population (2005 census)
  - Total: 72,818
  - Density: 10,400/km^{2} (27,000/sq mi)
- Time zone: UTC-5 (PET)
- UBIGEO: 040102

Alto Selva Alegre District is one of twenty-nine districts of the province Arequipa in Peru.
