= José Luis Bustamante District =

José Luis Bustamante y Rivero
- District
- Coat of arms
- Interactive map of José Luis Bustamante y Rivero
- Coordinates: 16°25′35.58″S 71°31′26.14″W
- Country: Peru
- Region: Arequipa
- Province: Arequipa
- Capital: Ciudad Satélite
- Subdivisions: 1 populated center

Government
  - Mayor: Oscar Zuñiga Rosas

Area
  - Total: 10.83 km^{2} (4.18 sq mi)
- Elevation: 2,310 m (7,580 ft)

Population (2005 census)
  - Total: 76,270
  - Density: 7,042/km^{2} (18,240/sq mi)
- Time zone: UTC-5 (PET)
- UBIGEO: 040129
- Website: http://www.munibustamante.gob.pe/

José Luis Bustamante y Rivero District is one of the twenty-nine districts of the Arequipa Province in Peru.
