= Jacobo Hunter District =

Coordinates: 16°27′00″S 71°33′00″W

Jacobo Hunter
- District
- Coat of arms
- Interactive map of Jacobo Hunter
- Country: Peru
- Region: Arequipa
- Province: Arequipa
- Founded: June 2, 1990
- Capital: Jacobo Hunter
- Subdivisions: 1 populated center

Government
  - Mayor: Aurelia Lupe Pila Barreda

Area
  - Total: 20.37 km^{2} (7.86 sq mi)
- Elevation: 2,250 m (7,380 ft)

Population (2005 census)
  - Total: 46,216
  - Density: 2,269/km^{2} (5,876/sq mi)
- Time zone: UTC-5 (PET)
- UBIGEO: 040107
- Website: munihunter.gob.pe

Jacobo Hunter District is one of the 29 districts of the Arequipa Province in Peru.

The district is named after Jacob Dixon Hunter (Jacobo Dixon Hunter) who was a Scottish doctor (born in Madison, Indiana (USA) on 8 September 1837. His father was working there as a Presbyterian pastor. His parents returned to Scotland and he grew up in Dollar, Clackmannanshire (his father's home town) and obtained an MD from University of Edinburgh in 1858. His MD thesis was on psoriasis and lepra. In 1859 he took a position as a ship's doctor and went to South America. He arrived in Callao on the first steam-powered ship to arrive there from Europe and decided to remain in South America. In 1861 he moved to Arequipa in Peru where he practiced medicine until his death in 1926.

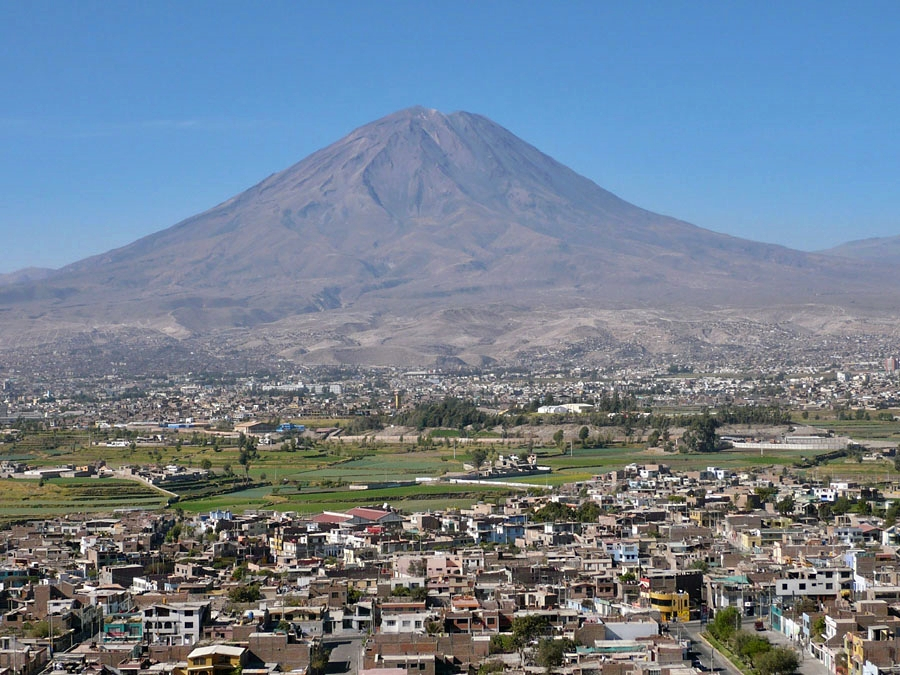
Panoramic view of Arequipa from Hunter District below.
