= Paucarpata District =

Paucarpata Pawqarpata
- District
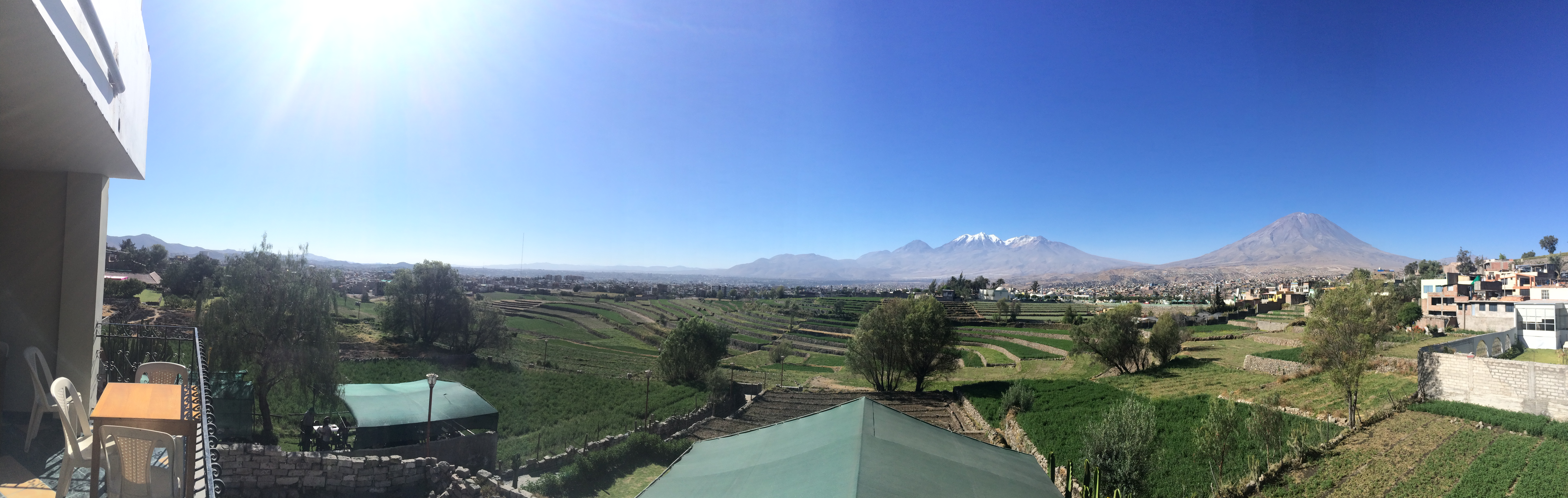
- The pata pata or andenes of Paucarpata with the city of Arequipa in the background
- Interactive map of Paucarpata
- Coordinates: 16°24′28.01″S 71°39′47.25″W
- Country: Peru
- Region: Arequipa
- Province: Arequipa
- Capital: Paucarpata

Government
  - Mayor: Marcio Soto Rivera

Area
  - Total: 31.07 km^{2} (12.00 sq mi)
- Elevation: 2,405 m (7,890 ft)

Population (2005 census)
  - Total: 125,255
  - Density: 4,031/km^{2} (10,440/sq mi)
- Time zone: UTC-5 (PET)
- UBIGEO: 040112
- Website: munipaucarpata.gob.pe

Paucarpata District is one of the twenty-nine districts of the Arequipa Province in Peru. It is noted for its terraced agricultural hills, called andenes in Spanish.
