= Cayma District =

Cayma Qayma
- District
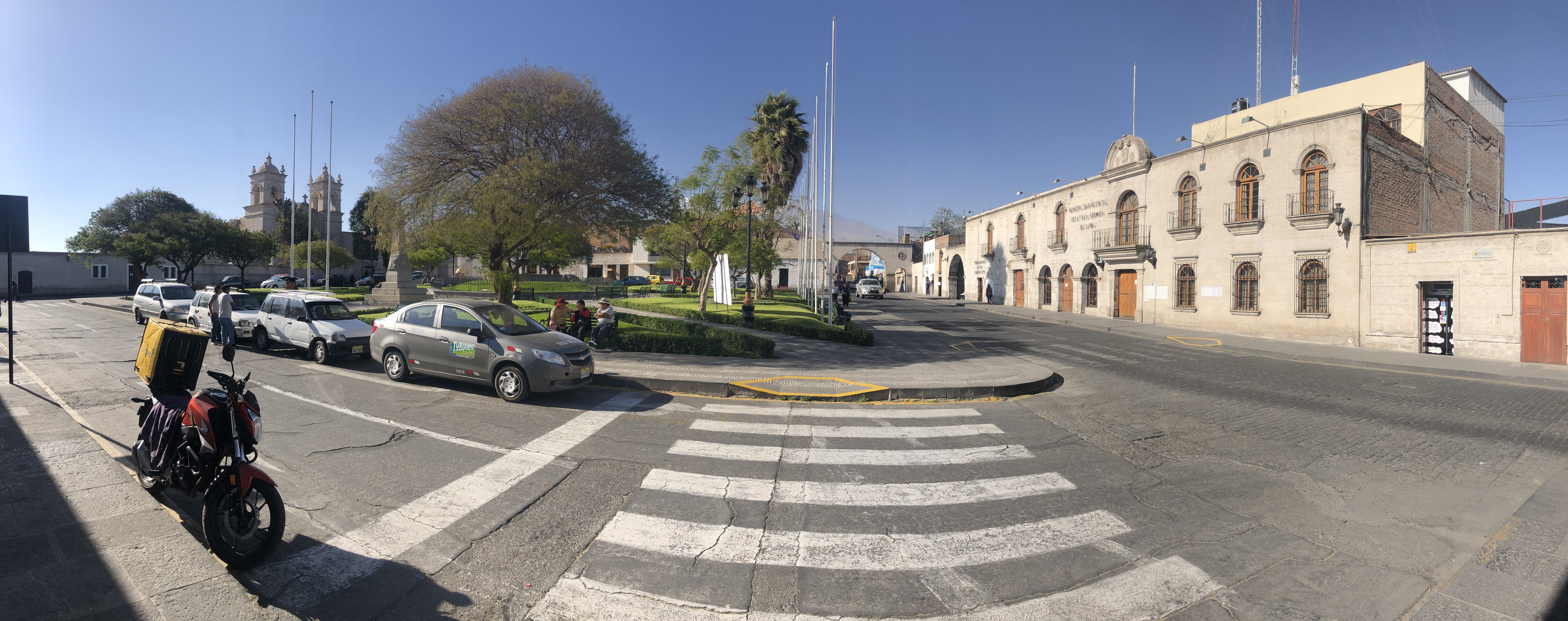
- Main Square of Cayma

- Coat of arms
- Interactive map of Cayma
- Coordinates: 16°22′53.50″S 71°32′44.02″W
- Country: Peru
- Region: Arequipa
- Province: Arequipa
- Capital: Cayma, Peru

Government
  - Mayor: Santiago Ulises Torres Montes Revilla

Area
  - Total: 246.31 km^{2} (95.10 sq mi)
- Elevation: 2,403 m (7,884 ft)

Population (2025)
  - Total: 111,606
  - Density: 453.11/km^{2} (1,173.6/sq mi)
- Time zone: UTC-5 (PET)
- UBIGEO: 040103
- Website: municayma.gob.pe

Cayma District is one of the twenty-nine districts of the Arequipa Province in Peru.

Cayma is known as the birthplace of Adobo, the city's official dish. It also houses 17th century churches. It is the place where the Lozada family, one of Arequipa's most prestigious families and founders of the Arequipa Clinic, have lived since their arrival from Spain in the 1600s.
