= Sachaca District =

Coordinates: 16°25′30″S 71°33′58″W

Sachaca Sach'aka
- District
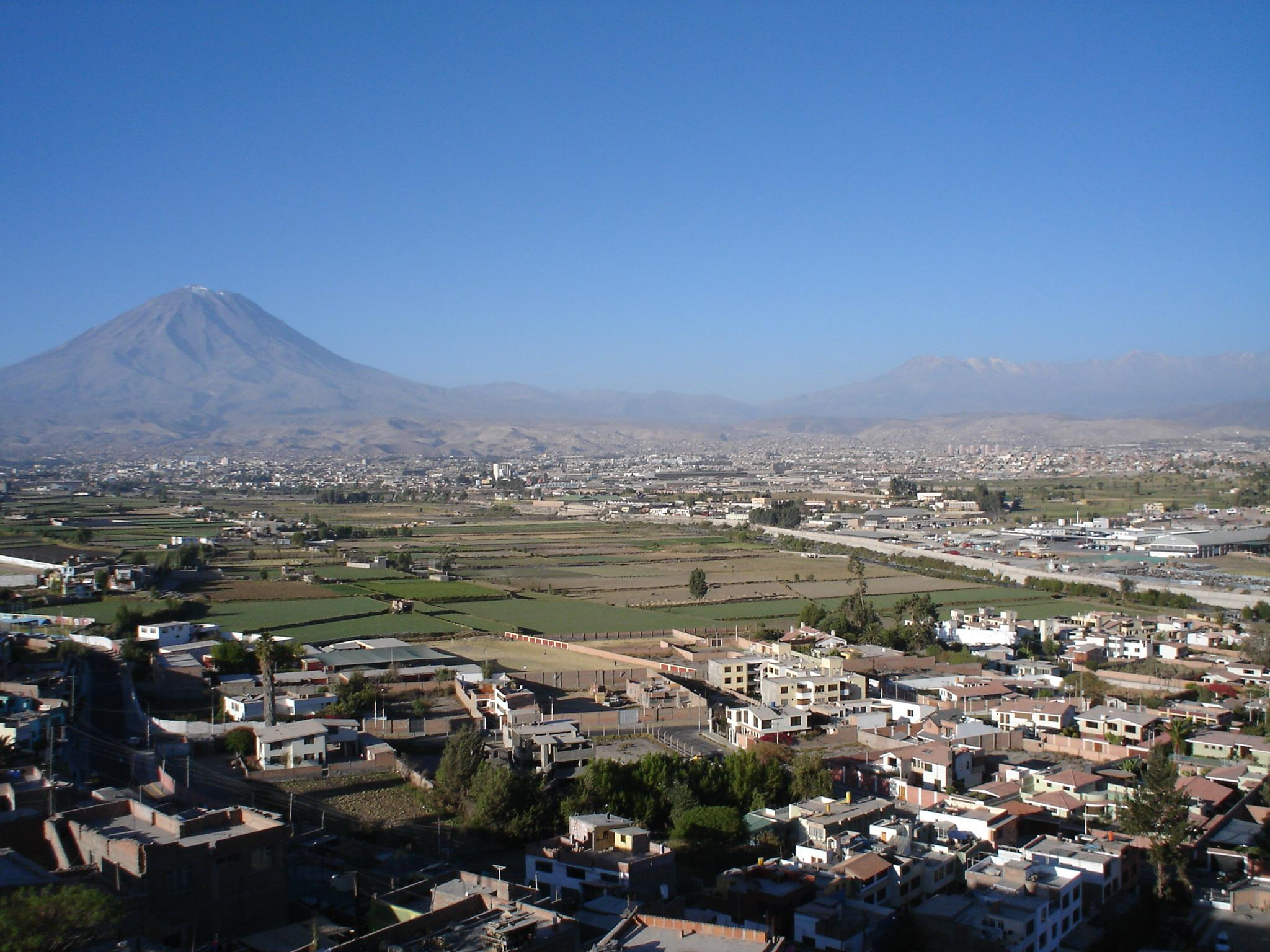
- Sachaca District

- Coat of arms
- Interactive map of Sachaca
- Country: Peru
- Region: Arequipa
- Province: Arequipa
- Capital: Sachaca

Government
  - Mayor: Alejandro Monico Carpio Valencia

Area
  - Total: 26.63 km^{2} (10.28 sq mi)
- Elevation: 2,240 m (7,350 ft)

Population (2005 census)
  - Total: 20,008
  - Density: 751.3/km^{2} (1,946/sq mi)
- Time zone: UTC-5 (PET)
- UBIGEO: 040117
- Website: munisachaca.gob.pe

Sachaca District is one of twenty-nine districts of the province Arequipa in Peru.
