= Tiabaya District =

Coordinates: 16°25′32″S 71°33′46″W

Tiabaya Tiyawaya
- District
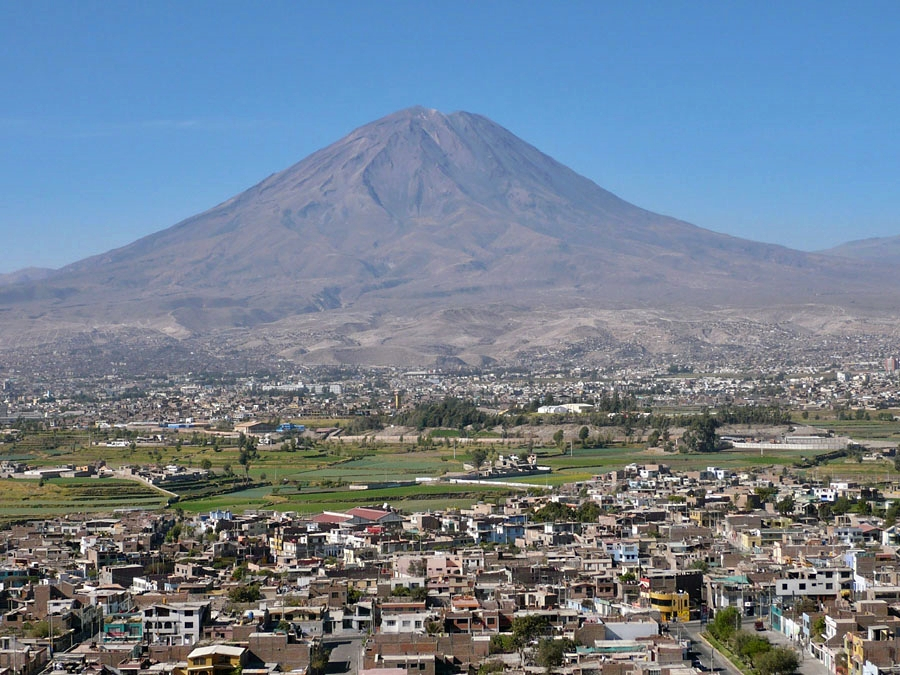
- Tiabaya District

- Coat of arms
- Interactive map of Tiabaya
- Country: Peru
- Region: Arequipa
- Province: Arequipa
- Capital: Tiabaya
- Subdivisions: 10 populated centers

Government
  - Mayor: Miguel Angel Cuadros Paredes

Area
  - Total: 31.62 km^{2} (12.21 sq mi)
- Elevation: 2,178 m (7,146 ft)

Population (2005 census)
  - Total: 15,043
  - Density: 475.7/km^{2} (1,232/sq mi)
- Time zone: UTC-5 (PET)
- UBIGEO: 040123
- Website: munitiabaya.gob.pe

Tiabaya District is one of the twenty-nine districts of the Arequipa Province in Peru.
