= Sabandía District =

Coordinates: 16°28′01″S 71°30′00″W

Sabandía
- District
- Coat of arms
- Interactive map of Sabandía
- Country: Peru
- Region: Arequipa
- Province: Arequipa
- Founded: April 22, 1822
- Capital: Sabandía

Government
  - Mayor: Lauriano Roberto Rosado Linares

Area
  - Total: 36.63 km^{2} (14.14 sq mi)
- Elevation: 2,390 m (7,840 ft)

Population (2005 census)
  - Total: 3,683
  - Density: 100.5/km^{2} (260.4/sq mi)
- Time zone: UTC-5 (PET)
- UBIGEO: 040116
- Website: munisabandia.gob.pe

Sabandía District is one of the twenty-nine districts of the Arequipa Province in Peru.
