= Miraflores District, Arequipa =

Miraflores District
- District
- Coat of arms
- Interactive map of Miraflores District
- Coordinates: 16°23′39.01″S 71°31′20.22″W
- Country: Peru
- Region: Arequipa
- Province: Arequipa
- Founded: January 2, 1857
- Capital: Miraflores
- Subdivisions: 1 populated center

Government
  - Mayor: Luis Magno Aguirre Chavez

Area
  - Total: 28.68 km^{2} (11.07 sq mi)
- Elevation: 2,430 m (7,970 ft)

Population (2005 census)
  - Total: 52,114
  - Density: 1,817/km^{2} (4,706/sq mi)
- Time zone: UTC-5 (PET)
- UBIGEO: 040110
- Website: munimirafloresaqp.gob.pe

Miraflores District is one of the twenty-nine districts of the Arequipa Province in Peru.
