= Yanahuara District =

Yanahuara Yanawara
- District
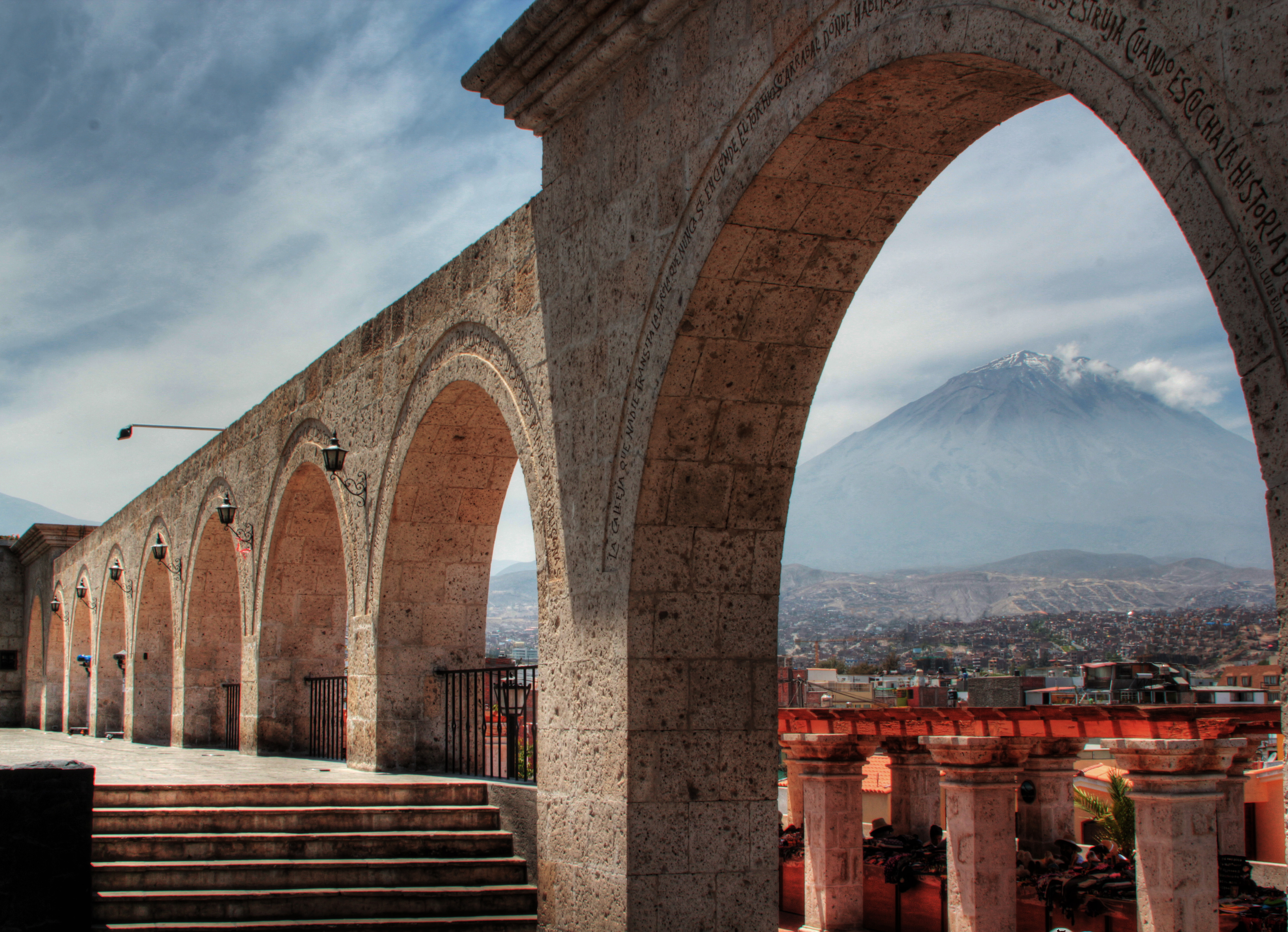
- Mirador of Yanahuara with Misti in the background

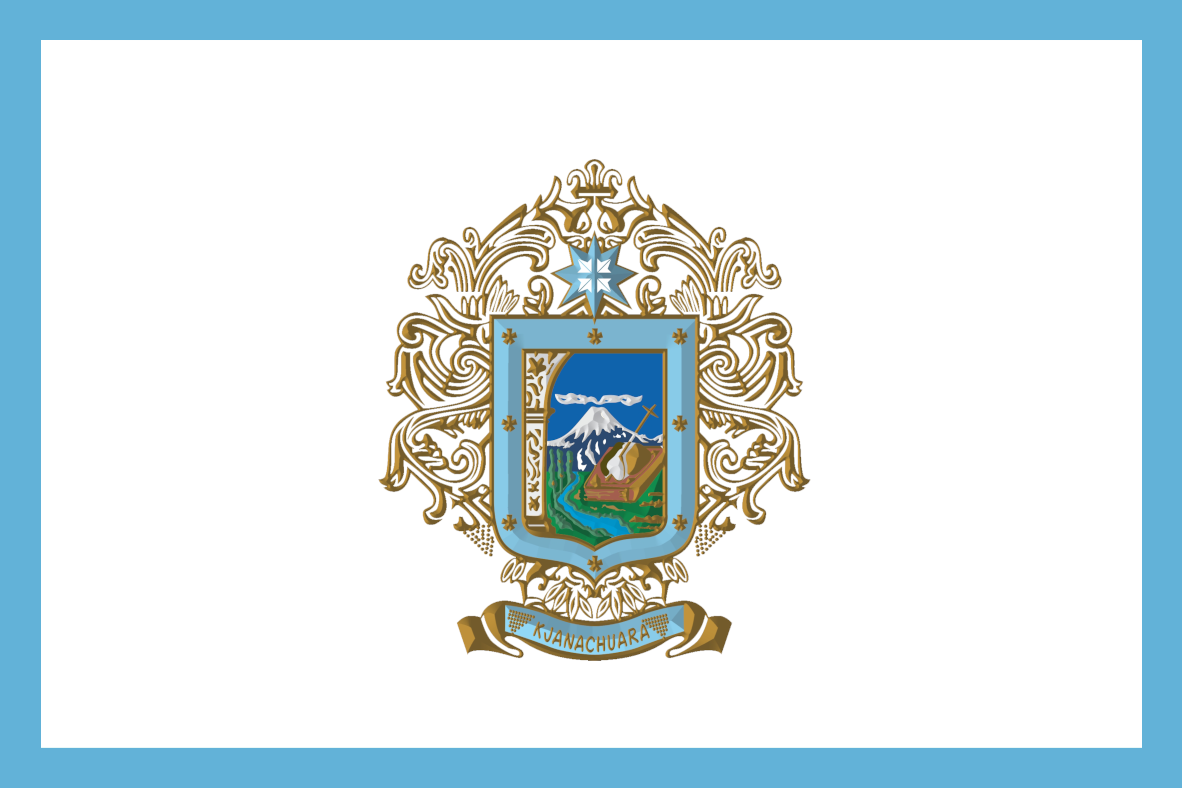
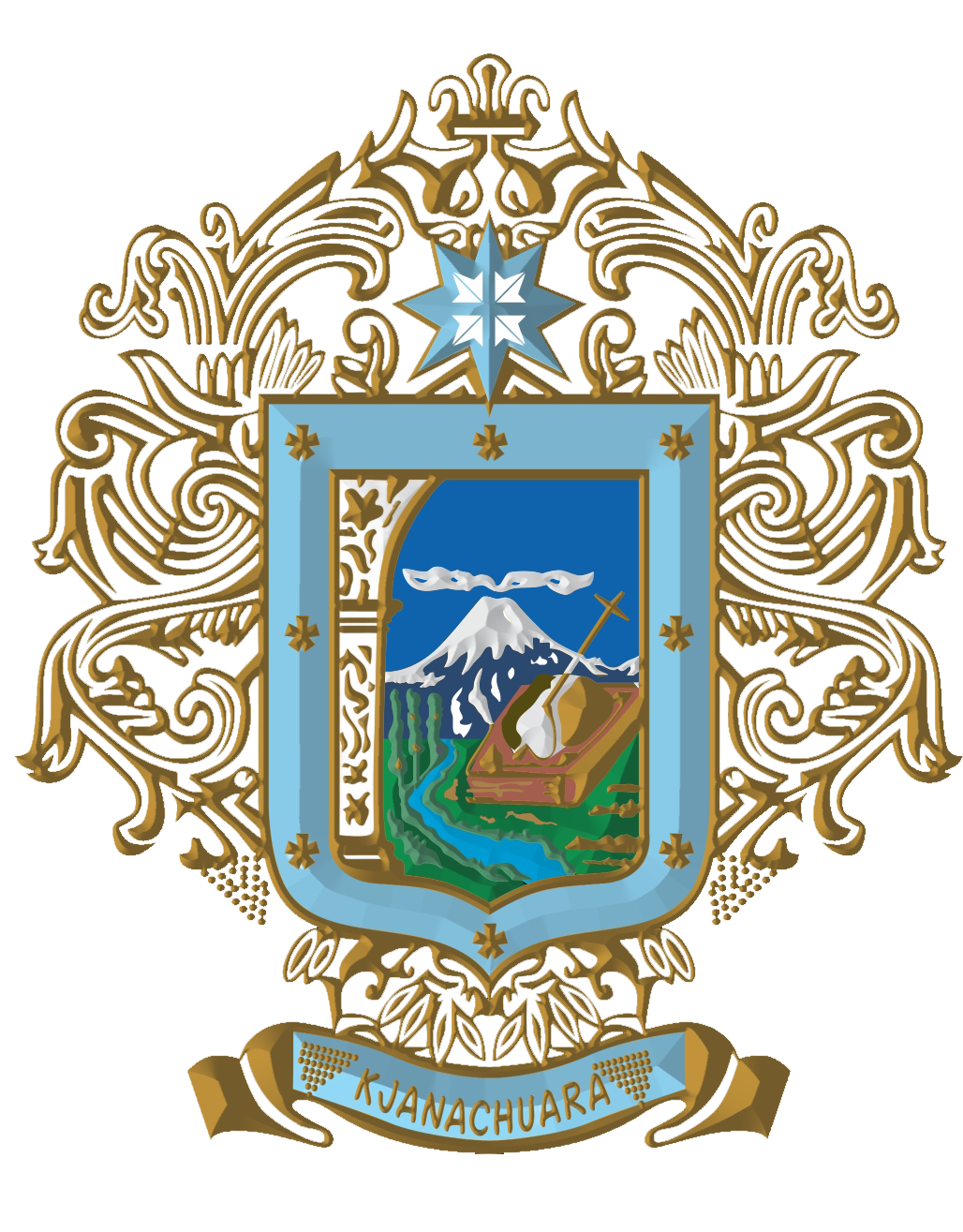
- Flag Coat of arms
- Interactive map of Yanahuara
- Coordinates: 16°23′14.56″S 71°32′31.56″W
- Country: Peru
- Region: Arequipa
- Province: Arequipa
- Capital: Yanahuara
- Subdivisions: 1 populated center

Government
  - Mayor: Elvis David Delgado Bacigalupi

Area
  - Total: 2.2 km^{2} (0.85 sq mi)
- Elevation: 2,390 m (7,840 ft)

Population (2025)
  - Total: 28,850
  - Density: 13,000/km^{2} (34,000/sq mi)
- Time zone: UTC-5 (PET)
- UBIGEO: 040126
- Website: muniyanahuara.gob.pe

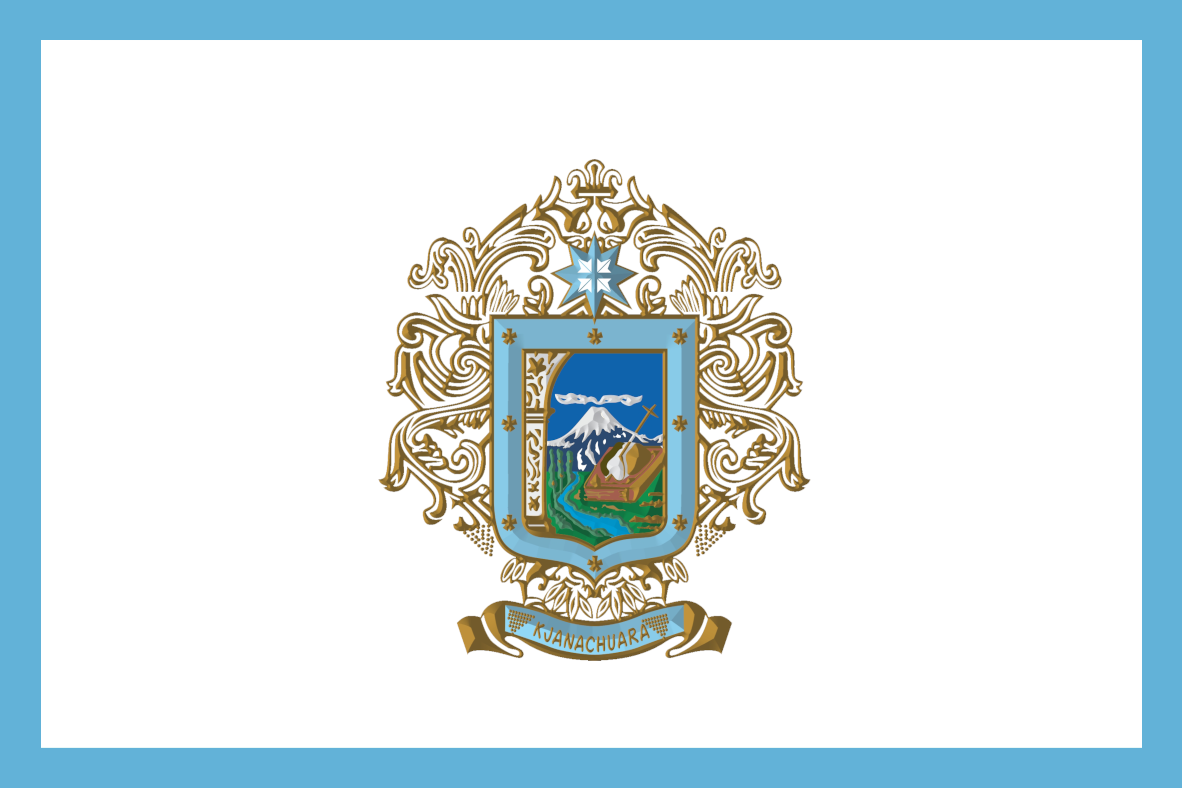
Flag

Yanahuara District is a suburb within the city of Arequipa, Peru. Yanahuara is well known for its buildings built from sillar, a pearly white volcanic rock. At least 1/4 of the district's area is taken by "Umacollo", where various middle-class residential houses of the city are located. Yanahuara includes the popular avenue strip known as the "Avenida Ejército", where many banks and modern offices are also located. Its surroundings contain various well-cared churches of the Spanish-colonial era, as well as public parks and the well-known "el mirador e iglesia de Yanahuara", a popular spot where tourists concur to view the city and its background volcanoes.

== Communities in Yanahuara ==
1. Valencia
2. Primavera
3. Barrio Magisterial 2
4. La Buganvillas
5. Santa Cecilia
6. Las Retamas
7. San José
8. Quinta Alpex
9. Jardin
10. Independencia Americana
11. Entel Perú
12. Cesar Vallejo
13. Ibarguen
14. Los Claveles
15. Santa Beatriz
16. Barreda
17. Piedra Santa I
18. Los Cedros
19. Los Independientes
20. La Estancia
21. Torreblanca
22. Buena Vista
23. La Gruta
24. Los Gladiolos
25. La Rinconada
26. Virgen del Carmen
27. Magnopata
28. Los Gladiolos
29. Piedra Santa II
30. Las Malvinas
31. Quinta Santa Catalina
32. Santa Patricia
33. Quinta Las Casuarinas
34. El Remanzo
35. Quinta Claudia
36. Quinta Leoncio Prado
37. Los Sauces
38. San Rafael
39. Villa El Prado F30631
40. Quinta La Cascada
41. San Pedro
42. El Texao
43. Paisajista Chilina
44. Luebke Reorganizada
45. Antonio Raymondi
46. Fraternidad
47. Juan XXIII
48. Quiroz Garcia
49. Magisterial 174 III Etapa
50. Nuestra Señora de Fatima
51. Entel Perú
52. La Rinconada
53. El Silencio
54. Quinta La Gruta
55. Quinta García Calderón
56. Quinta La Sevillana
57. Quinta María Santos

== Images ==
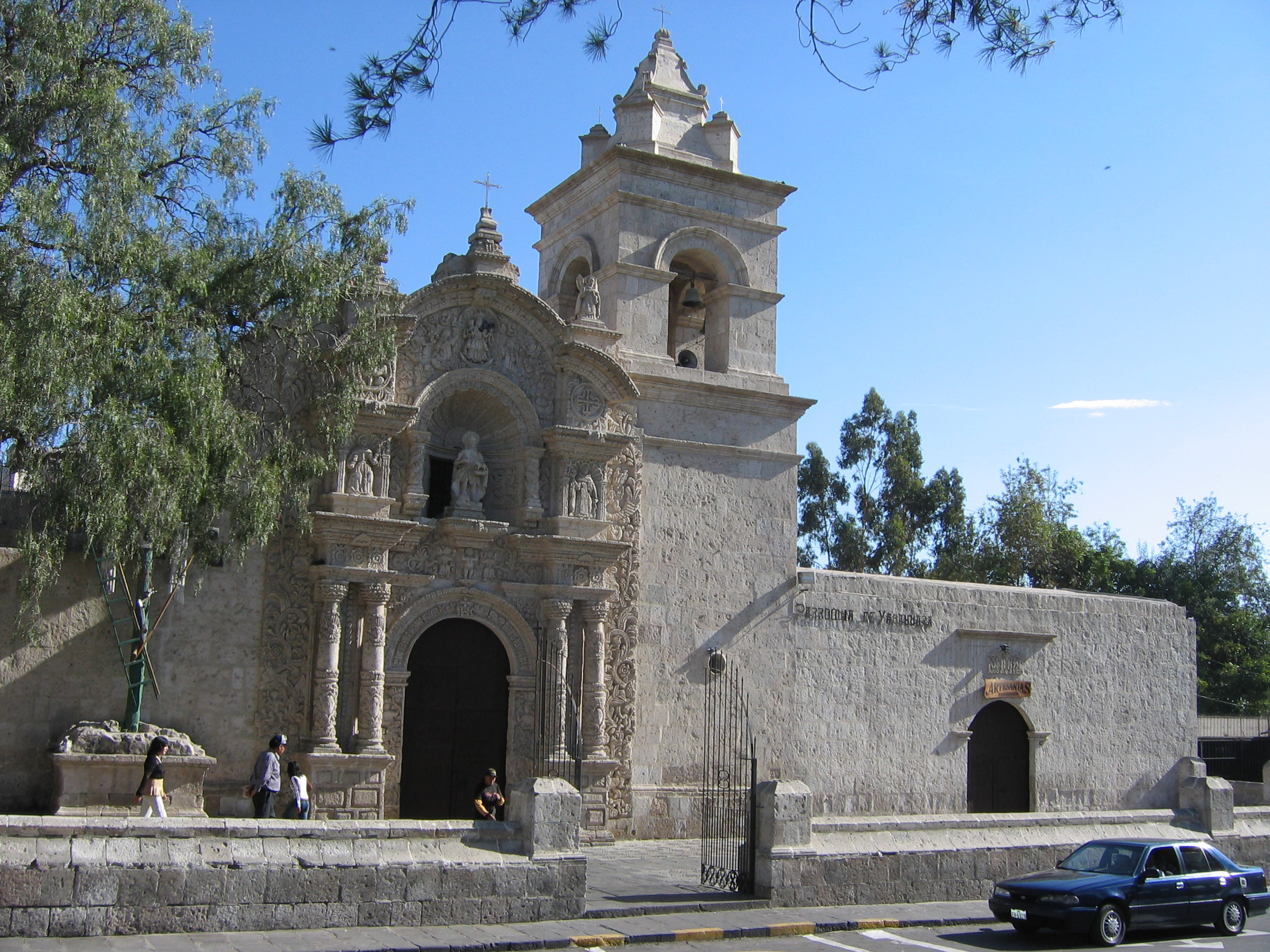
Church San Juan Bautista in Yanahuara

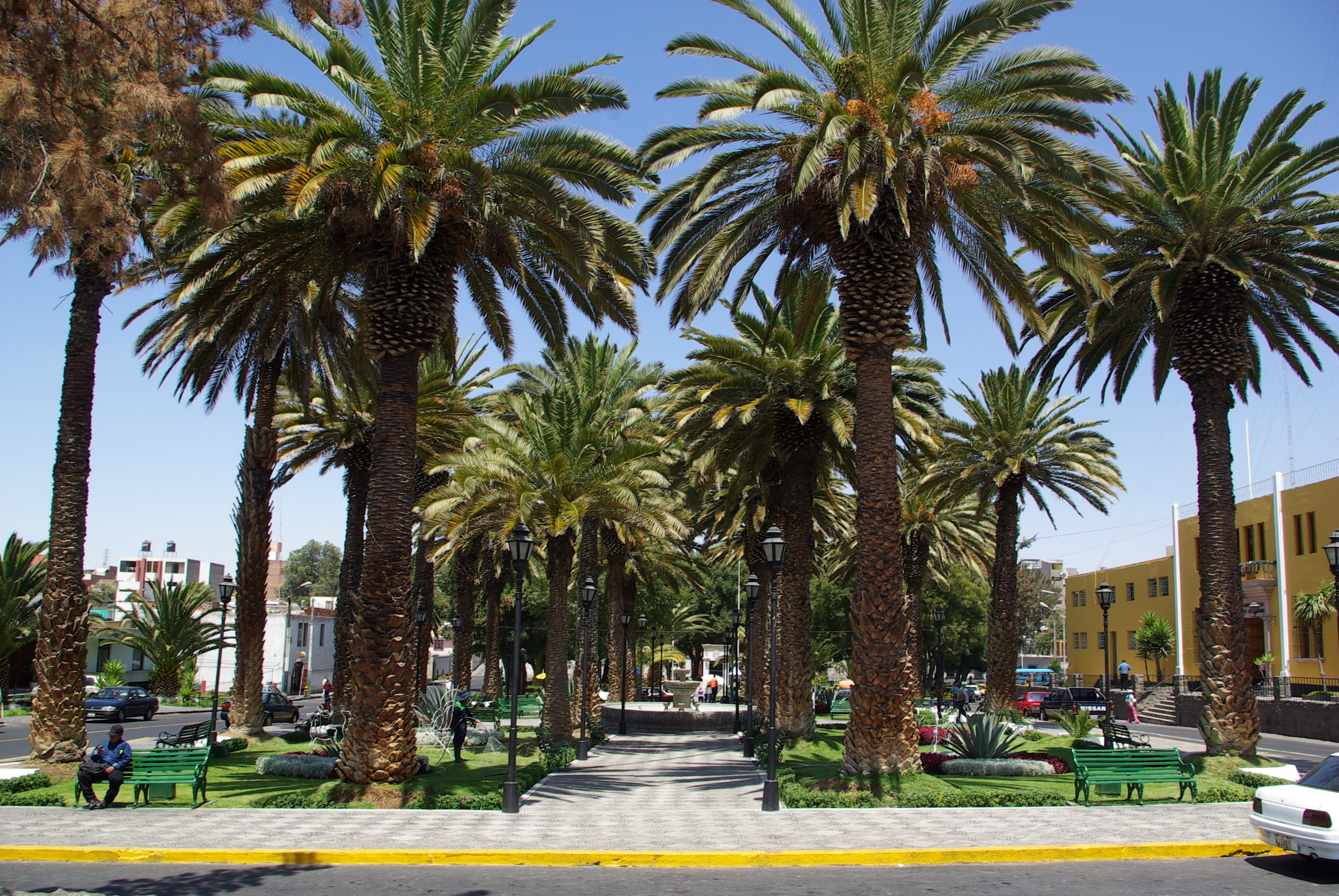
The main square in Yanahuara

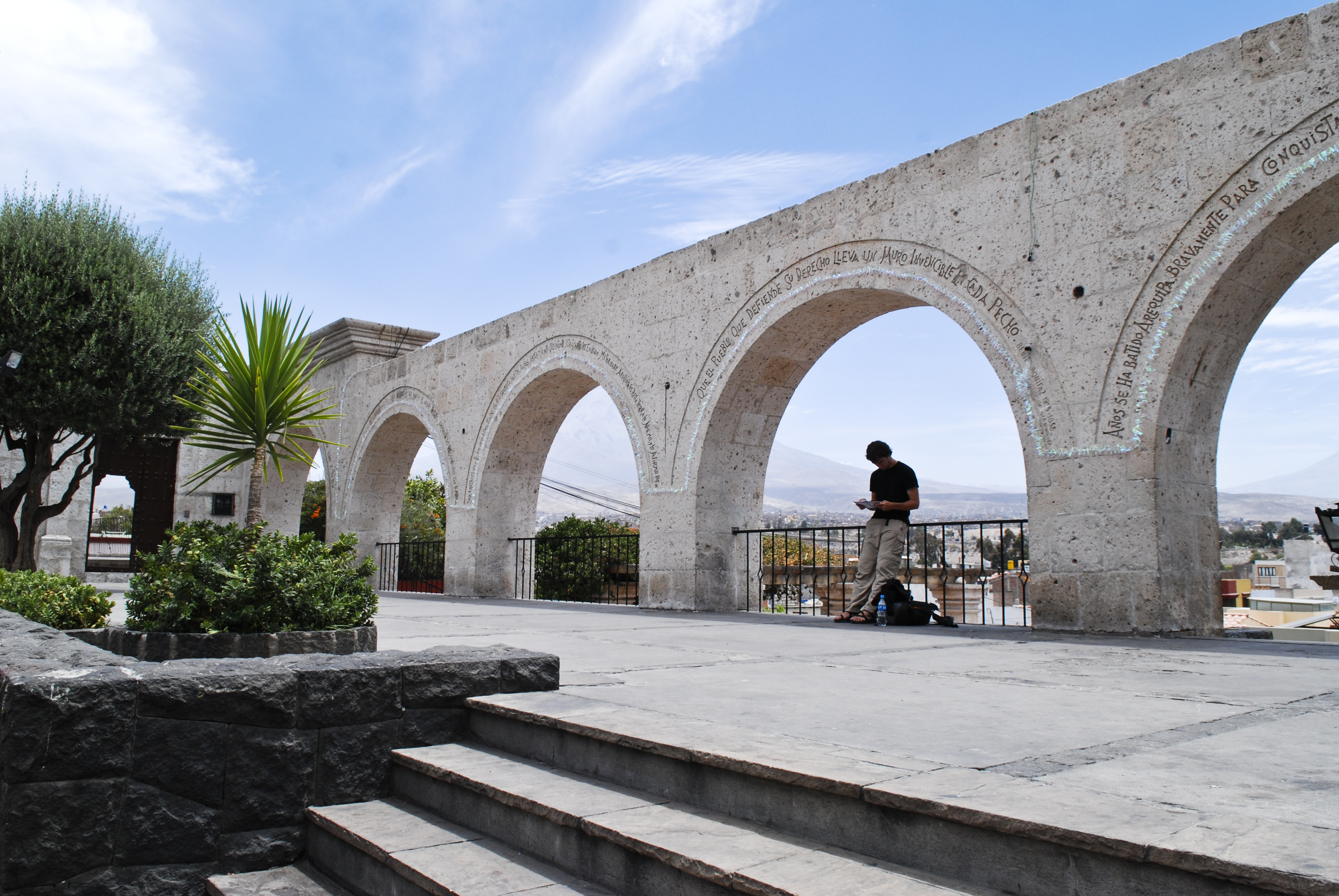
Mirador of Yanahuara

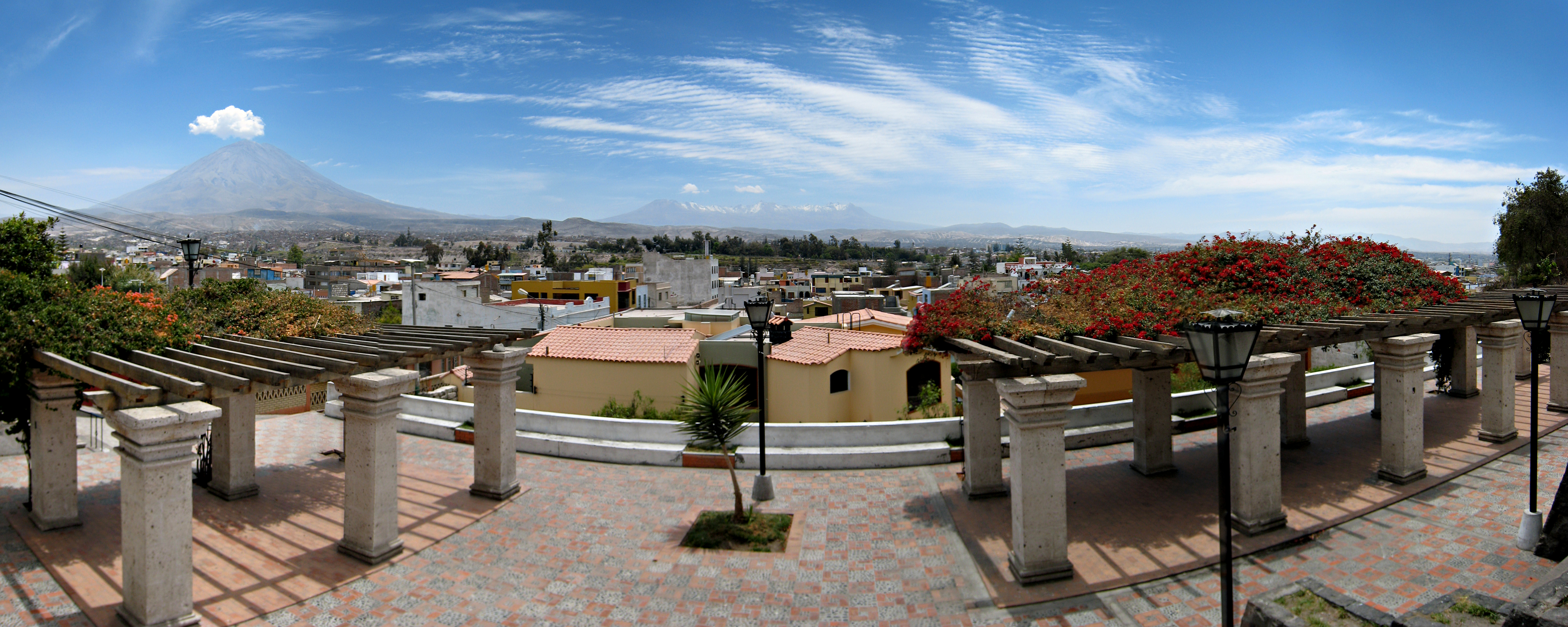
View of Arequipa from the Mirador of Yanahuara
