= Socabaya District =

Socabaya
- District
- Coat of arms
- Interactive map of Socabaya
- Coordinates: 16°28′12″S 71°32′24″W
- Country: Peru
- Region: Arequipa
- Province: Arequipa
- Capital: Socabaya

Government
  - Mayor: Wuilber Mendoza Aparicio

Area
  - Total: 18.64 km^{2} (7.20 sq mi)
- Elevation: 2,300 m (7,500 ft)

Population (2005 census)
  - Total: 60,534
  - Density: 3,248/km^{2} (8,411/sq mi)
- Time zone: UTC-5 (PET)
- UBIGEO: 040122
- Website: munisocabaya.gob.pe

Socabaya District is one of the twenty-nine districts of the Arequipa Province in Peru.
