= Mariano Melgar District =

Coordinates: 16°24′00″S 71°28′59″W

Mariano Melgar
- District
- Coat of arms
- Interactive map of Mariano Melgar
- Country: Peru
- Region: Arequipa
- Province: Arequipa
- Founded: August 27, 2007
- Capital: Mariano Melgar
- Subdivisions: 1 populated center

Government
  - Mayor: Oscar Alfredo Ayala Arenas

Area
  - Total: 29.83 km^{2} (11.52 sq mi)
- Elevation: 2,385 m (7,825 ft)

Population (2005 census)
  - Total: 53,303
  - Density: 1,787/km^{2} (4,628/sq mi)
- Time zone: UTC-5 (PET)
- UBIGEO: 040109
- Website: munimarianomelgar.gob.pe

Mariano Melgar District is one of the twenty-nine districts of the Arequipa Province in Peru.
