= Arequipa District =

District of Arequipa Province, Peru

Coordinates: 16°24′7″S 71°32′20″W

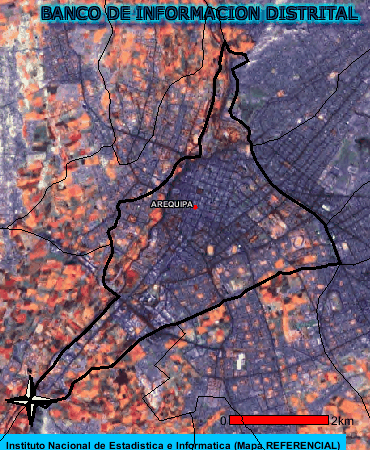
Aerial view of the district

Arequipa is a district of the Arequipa Province in Peru. The downtown area of the city of Arequipa is located in this district. The current mayor of the district is Omar Julio Candia Aguilar.
