= Cerro Colorado District =

Cerro Colorado Pukaurqu
- District
- Coat of arms
- Interactive map of Cerro Colorado
- Coordinates: 16°22′36.47″S 71°33′37.17″W
- Country: Peru
- Region: Arequipa
- Province: Arequipa
- Founded: February 26, 1954
- Capital: La Libertad

Government
  - Mayor: Manuel Vera Paredes

Area
  - Total: 174.9 km^{2} (67.5 sq mi)
- Elevation: 2,406 m (7,894 ft)

Population (2005 census)
  - Total: 106,893
  - Density: 611.2/km^{2} (1,583/sq mi)
- Time zone: UTC-5 (PET)
- UBIGEO: 040104
- Website: municerrocolorado.gob.pe

Cerro Colorado District is one of twenty-nine districts of the province Arequipa in Peru.

It is the location of the Hipódromo de Arequipa, one of two active venues for horse racing in the country.
