= 1998 World Monuments Watch =

The World Monuments Watch is a flagship advocacy program of the New York–based private non-profit organization World Monuments Fund (WMF) and American Express to call to action and challenge government authorities responsible for important cultural resources to identify sites immediately at risk, and to stimulate public awareness of the tremendous need to preserve and create sustainable uses for significant heritage made by man.

== Selection process ==
Every two years, the program publishes a select list known as the Watch List of 100 Most Endangered Sites that is in urgent need of preservation funding and protection. The sites are nominated by public authorities, local preservation groups, and qualified individuals. An independent panel of international experts then select 100 candidates from these entries to be part of the Watch List, based on the significance of the site's overall significance, the urgency of its situation, the viability of action plans to save it, and the ability of a local constituency to sustainably maintain the site in the future with the means to do so. WMF and American Express award grants to sites included on the Watch List. In addition, the leverage from the listing spurs government agencies and local donors to allocate funds and take an active role in protecting the cultural landmark.

== 1998 Watch List ==
The 1998 World Monuments Watch List of 100 Most Endangered Sites was launched on September 8, 1997, by WMF President Bonnie Burnham.

=== List by country/territory ===
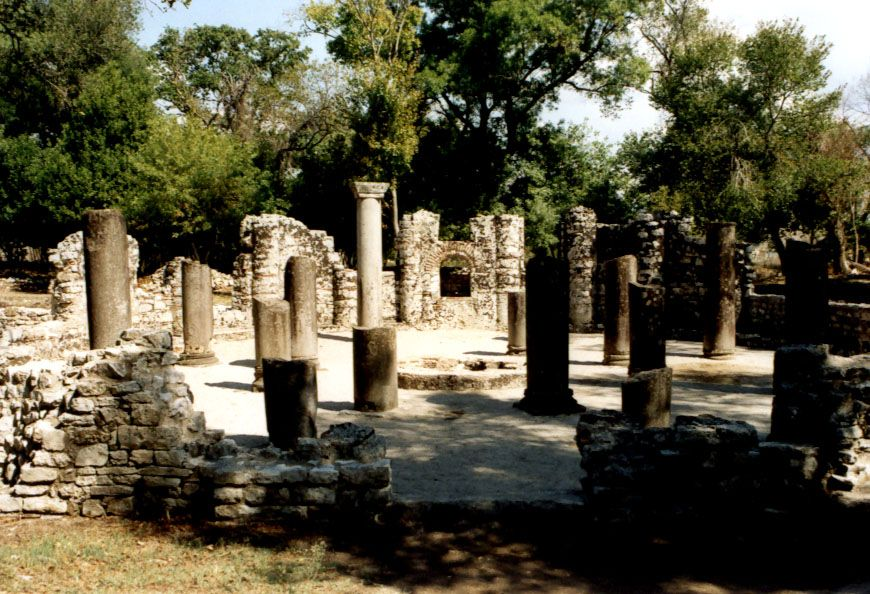
Irretrievable losses from the political turmoil that followed the collapse of Albania's communist regime in 1992 led to the Butrint archaeological site's inclusion on the 1998 Watch List.

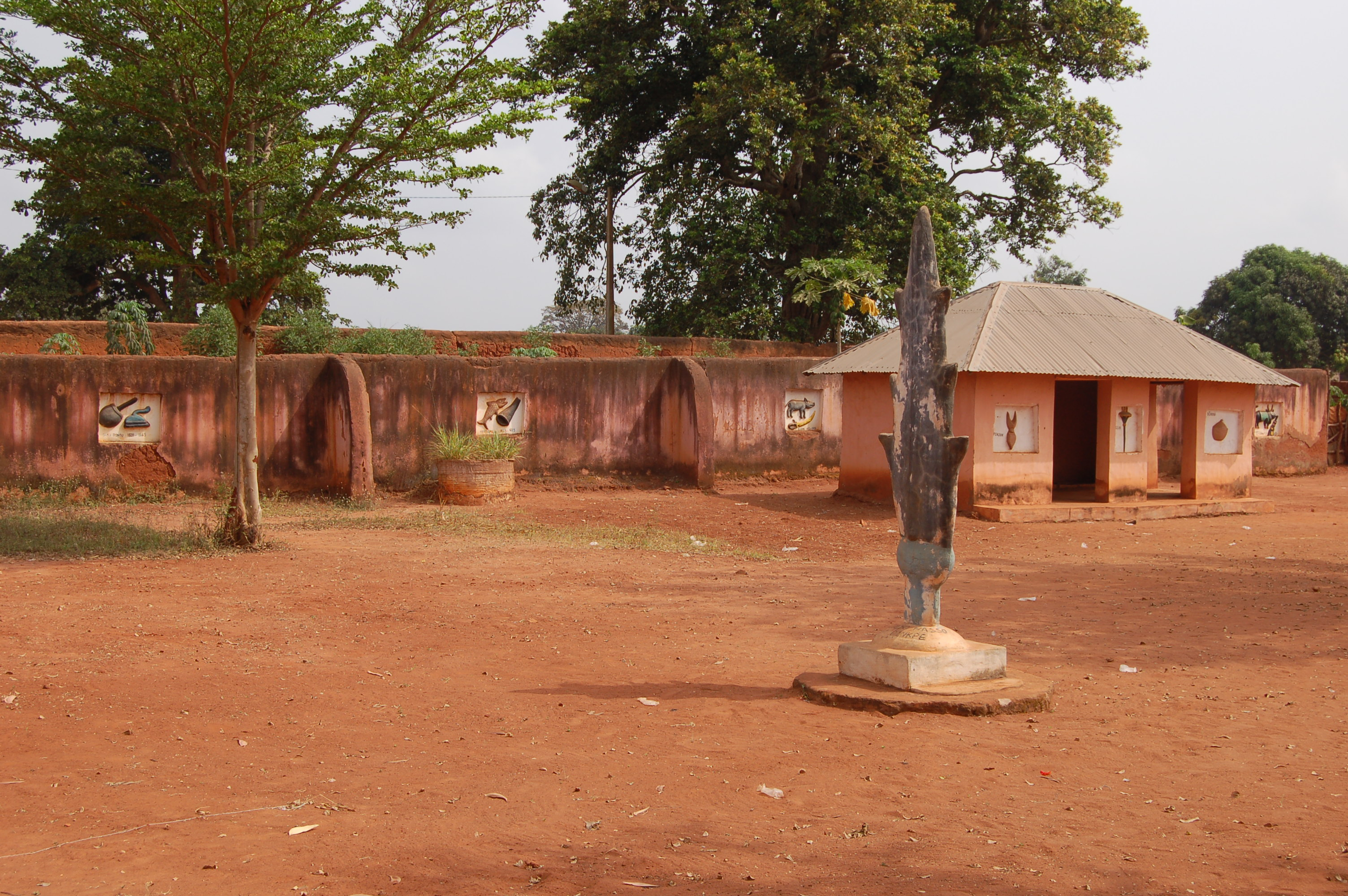
Benin's Royal Palaces of Abomey, a group of earthen structures built by the Fon people, is one of the most famous and historically significant traditional sites in West Africa.

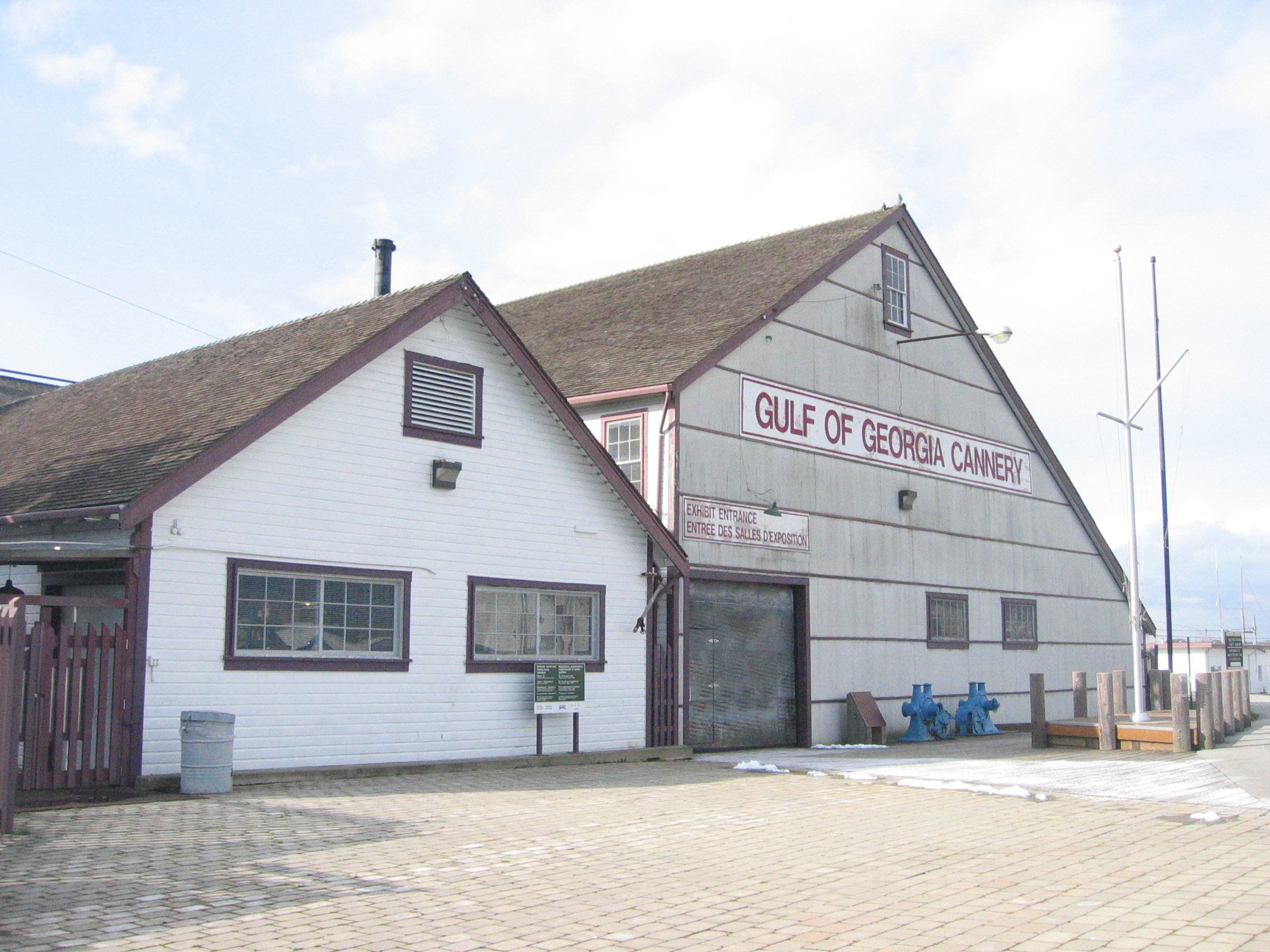
Built in 1894 to produce canned salmon, Gulf of Georgia Cannery has been declared as a National Historic Site of Canada.

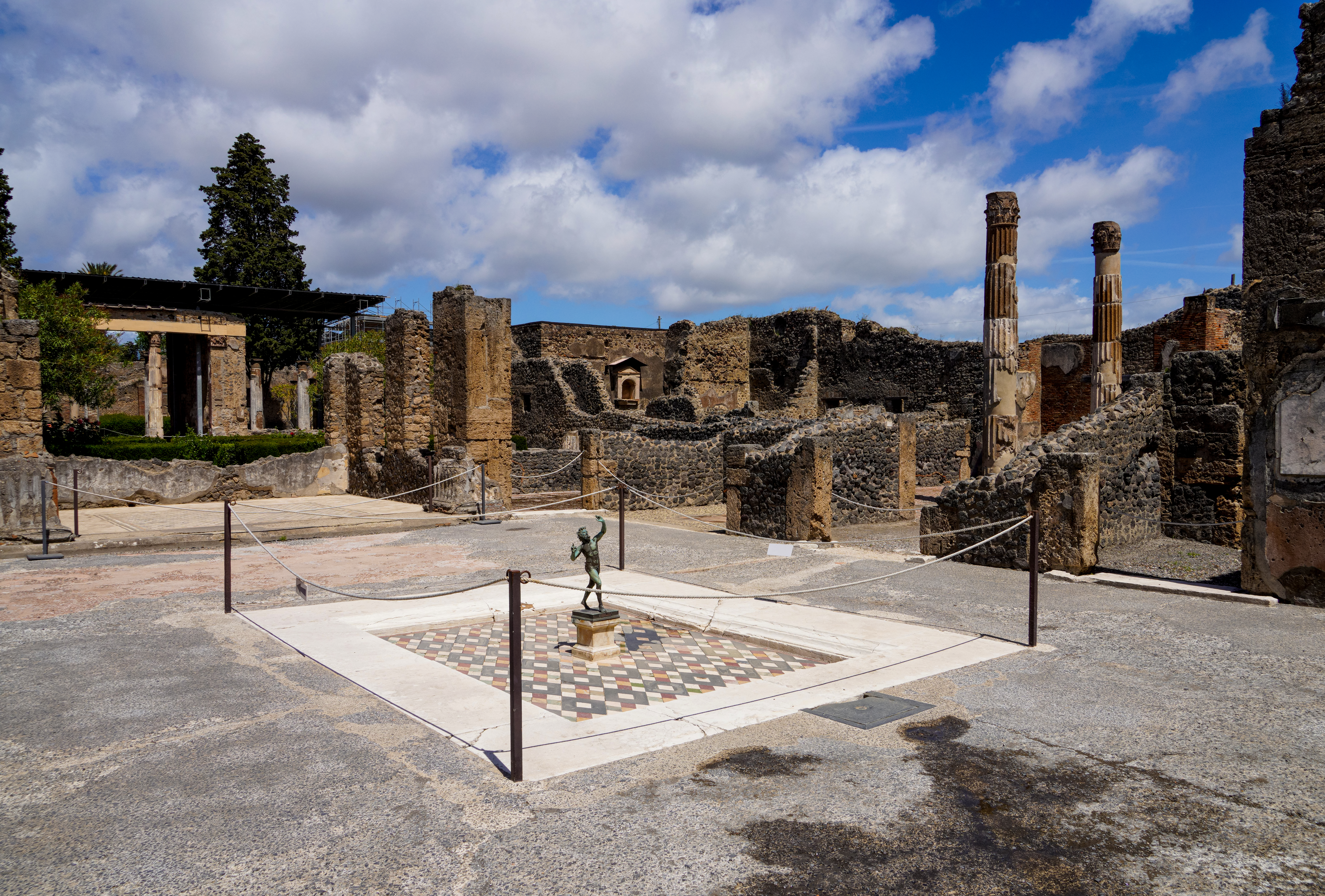
Along with Herculaneum, its sister city, Pompeii was destroyed, and completely buried, during a long catastrophic eruption of the Italian volcano Mount Vesuvius spanning two days in AD 79.

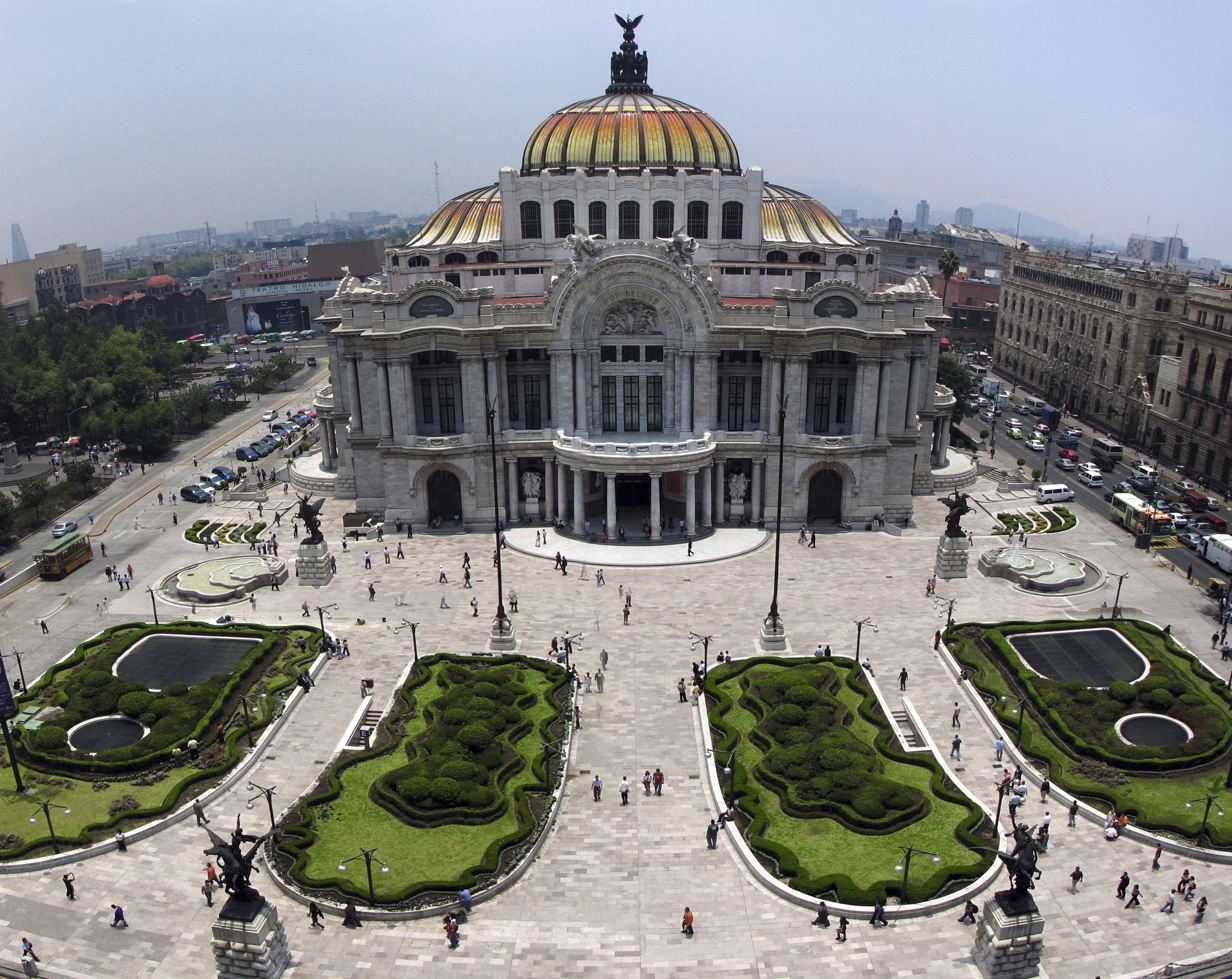
Mexico City's Palace of Fine Arts is known for both its extravagant Beaux Arts exterior in imported Italian Carrara white marble and its murals by Diego Rivera

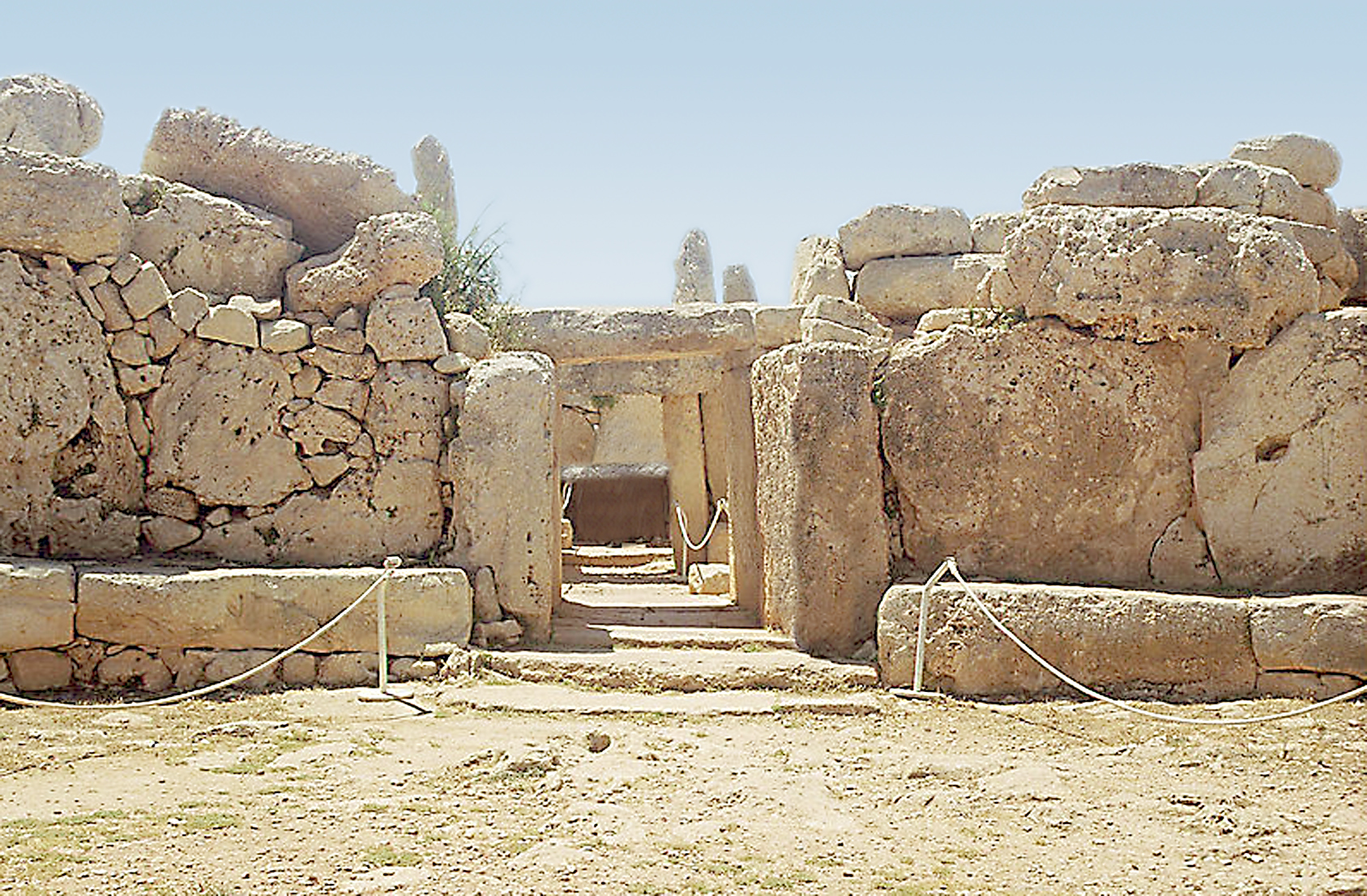
Mnajdra Prehistoric Temples are among the most ancient religious sites on Earth.

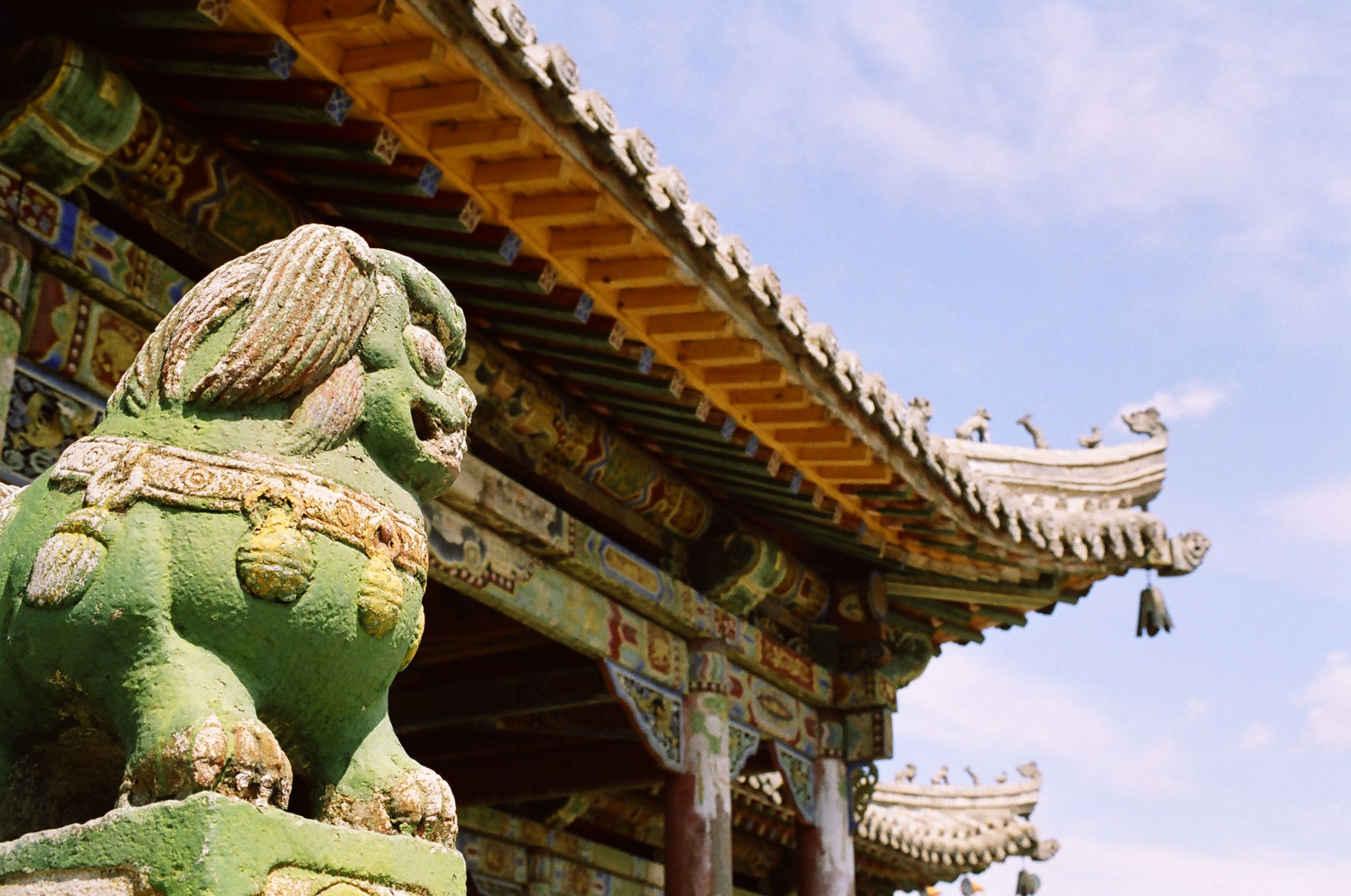
The highly ornate wooden structure of Green Palace, built without nails, is a sacred monument for Mongolians and continues to have an active function as a museum of cultural artifacts.

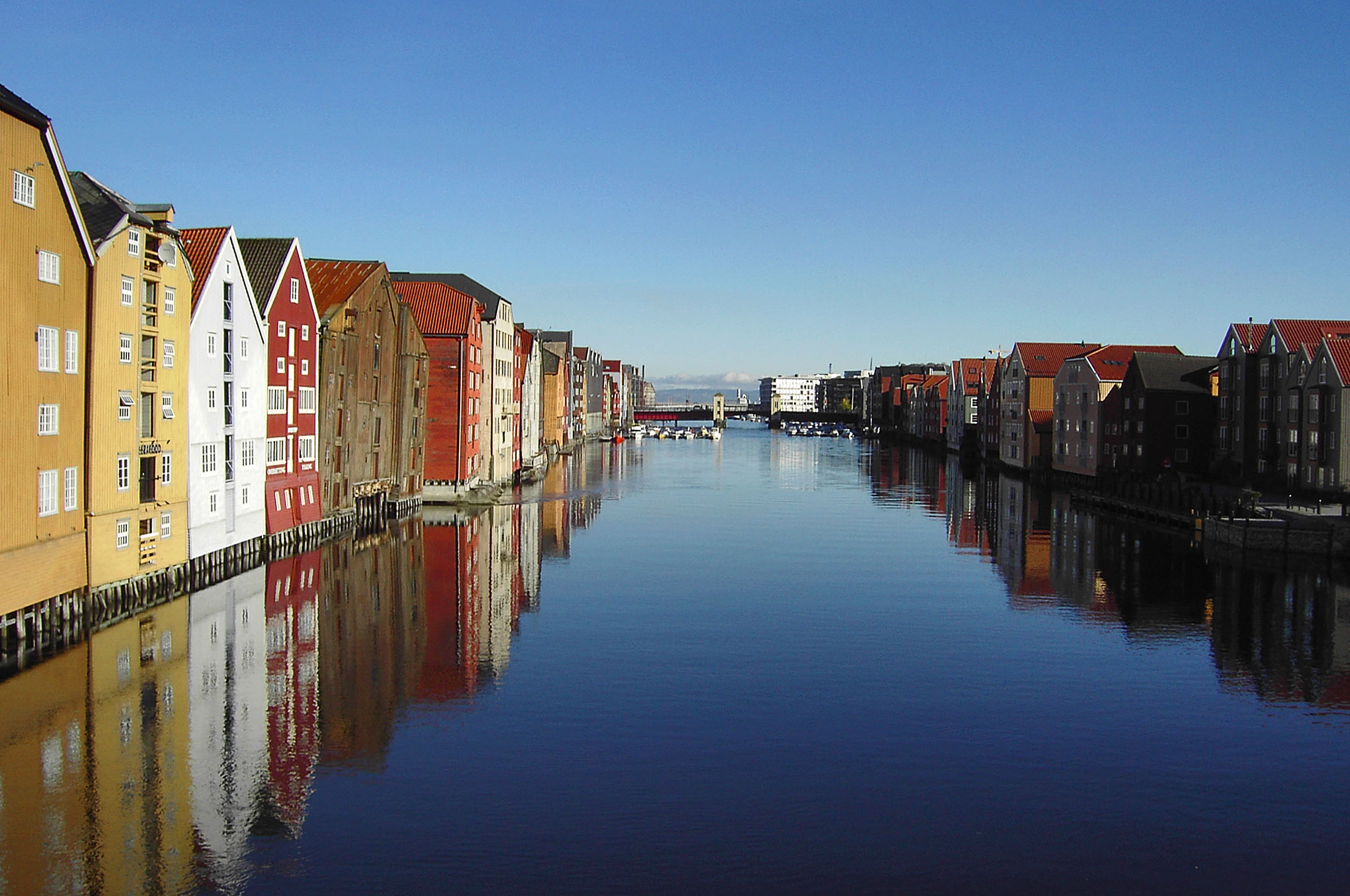
The wooden architecture of Trondheim is at risk of being compromised with inappropriate new materials and additions.

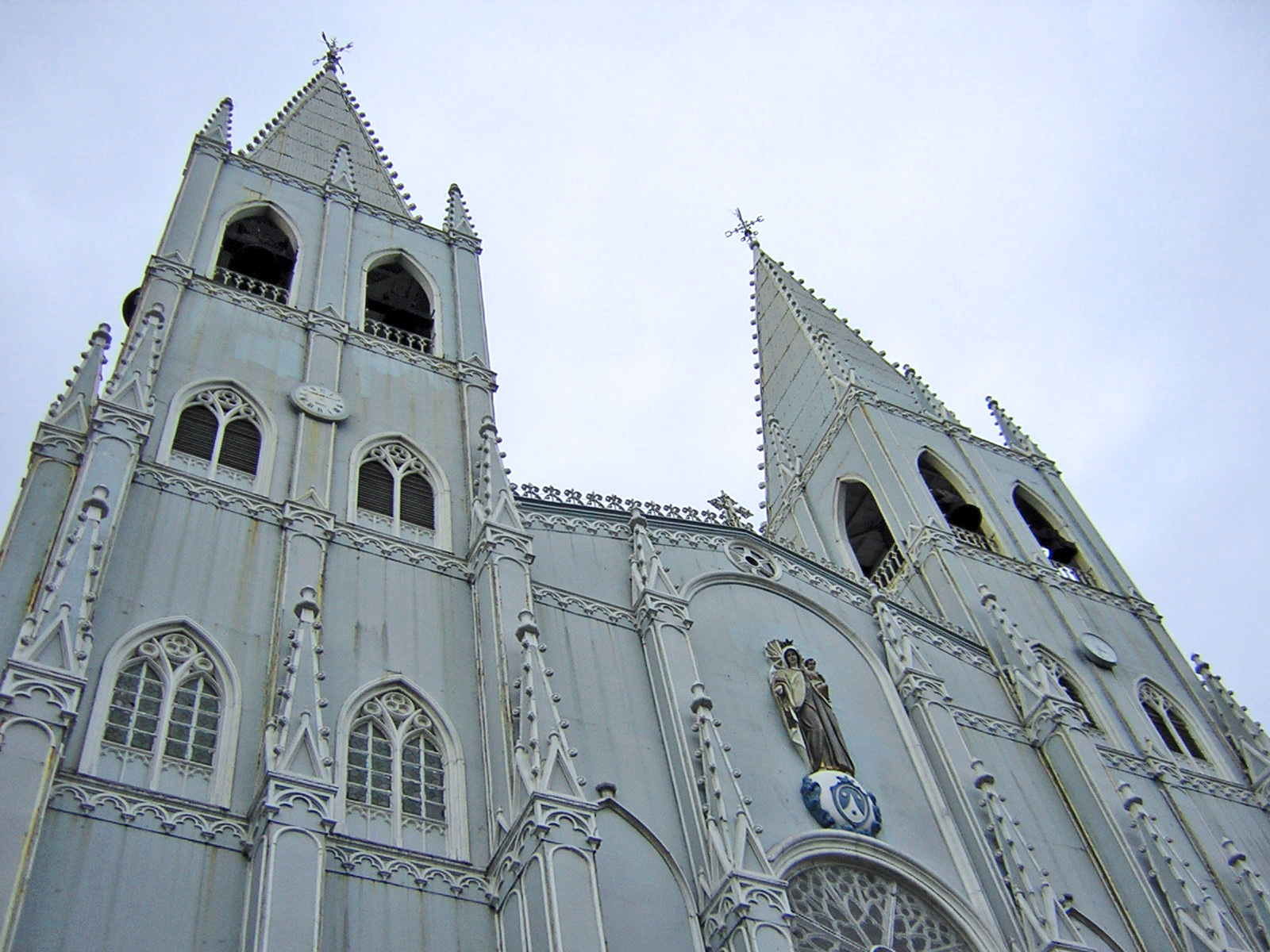
An example of the revival of Gothic architecture in the Philippines, the San Sebastian Basilica is the only all-steel church or basilica in Asia.

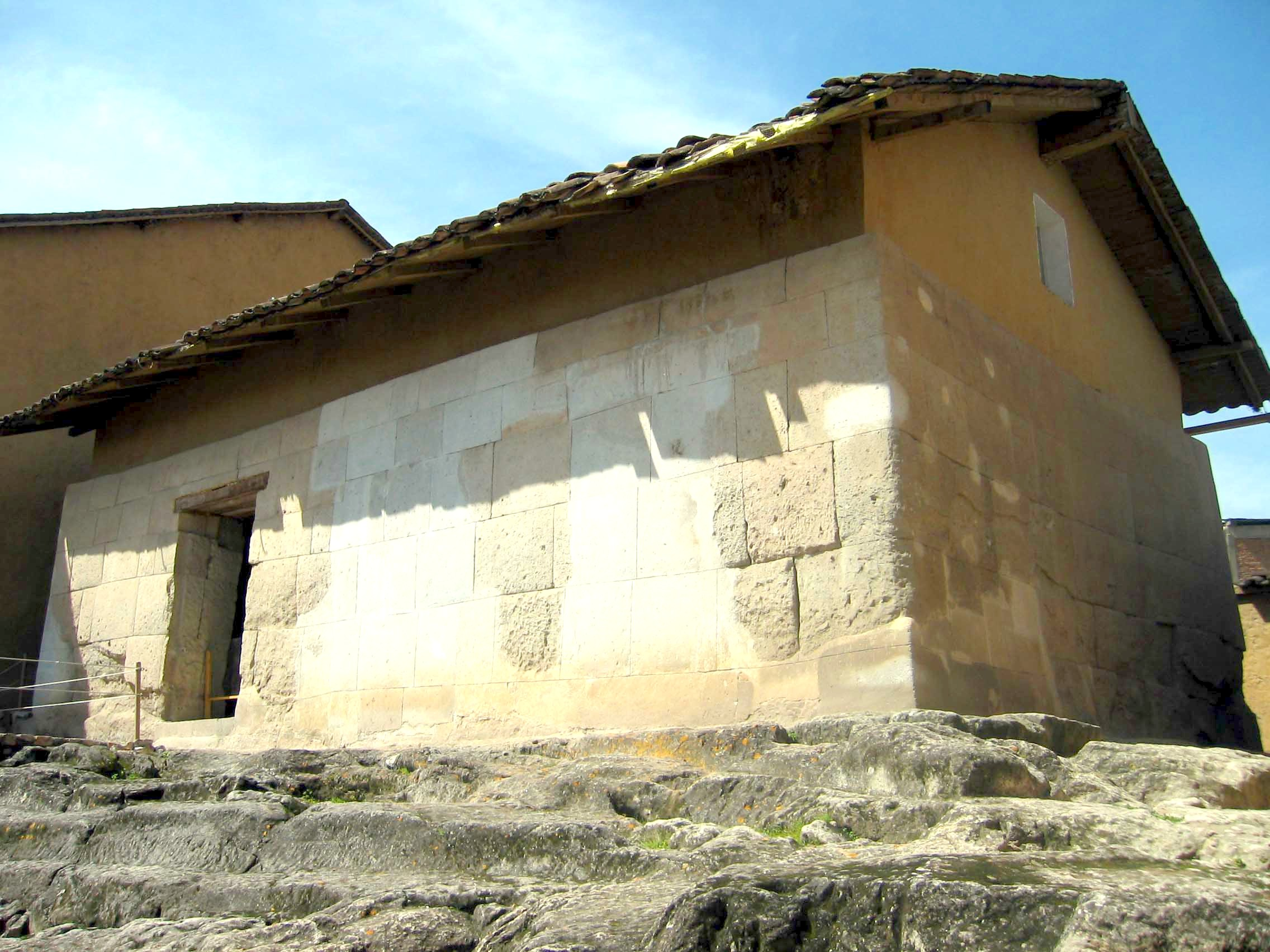
The "Ransom Room", in Cajamarca, Peru, is considered by most Peruvian historians to be the place where the Inca Empire came to an end with the capture and eventual execution of the Inca Emperor Atahualpa.

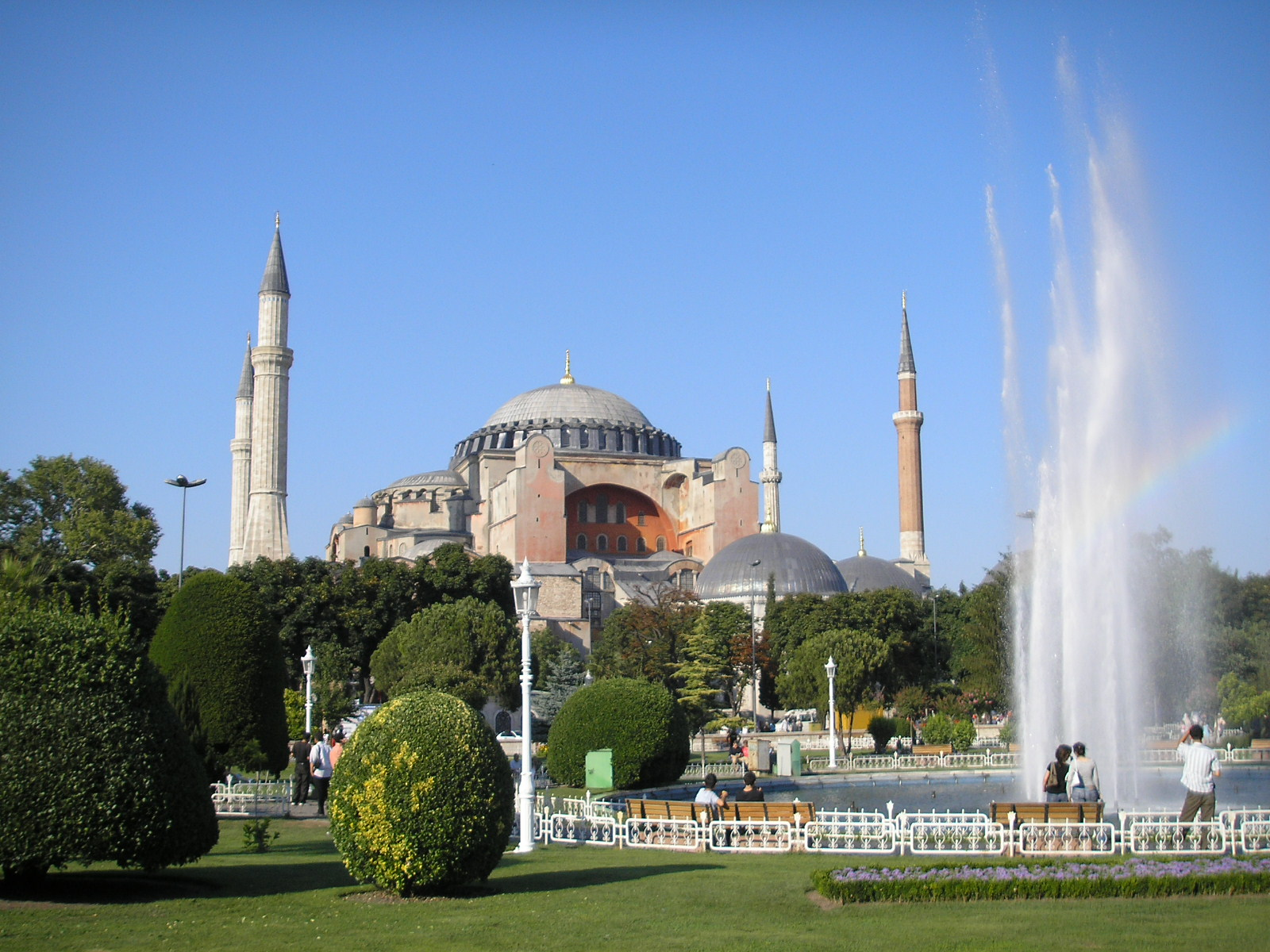
Famous in particular for its massive dome, the Hagia Sophia in Istanbul, Turkey is considered the epitome of Byzantine architecture and to have "changed the history of architecture."

Number	Country/Territory	Site^{[A]}	Location^{[B]}	Period^{[B]}
1	Afghanistan	Herat Old City	Herat	1100–1899
2	Albania	Butrint Archaeological Site	Sarandë	8th century BC–15th century AD
3	Argentina	Ushuaia Prison	Ushuaia, Tierra del Fuego	1902–1912
4	Belgium	Previous Radio and Television Building	Brussels	1935
5	Belgium	Tour and Taxis	Brussels	1897–1907
6	Belgium	Wortel Colony Estate	Hoogstraten	1822
7	Benin	Royal Palaces of Abomey	Abomey	1645–1906
8	Bolivia	Arani and Callapa Churches	Arani, Cochabamba & Callapa, La Paz	1560 and 1745
9	Bolivia	Rio Lauca Prehistoric Burial Towers	Oruro Department	1200–1600
10	Bosnia and Herzegovina	Village of Počitelj	Počitelj	1444–Present
11	Bulgaria	Madara Horseman	Kaspichan	8th–9th century
12	Cambodia	Banteay Chhmar Temple of Jayavarman VII	Thmar Puok	1100–1199
13	Canada	Gulf of Georgia Cannery	Richmond, British Columbia	1894–1964
14	Chile	Alameda Railroad Station	Santiago	1900
15	Chile	Tulor Aldea	San Pedro de Atacama	5th century BC–2nd century AD
16	China	Jufu Hall	Xian Nong Tan (The Temple of Agriculture), Beijing	1420
17	China	Namseling Manor	Drachi, Tibet	14th century
18	China	Palpung Tibetan Monastery	Babang Village, Sichuan	1725
19	Croatia	Ducal Palace	Zadar	16th century
20	Croatia	Franciscan Monastery Library	Dubrovnik	1667
21	Cuba	Reina Cemetery	Cienfuegos	1839
22	Czech Republic	Follies and Conservatory in Lednice Park	Lednice and Valtice municipalities	1797–1848
23	Czech Republic	Prague's Historic Center	Prague	9th century BC–Present
24	Czech Republic	Heavenly Father Chapel	Kutná Hora	14th century
25	Czech Republic	Nebílovy Mansion	Nebilovy	1706–1715
26	Egypt	Mortuary Temple of King Ahmenhotep III,	Gurna, Luxor	14th century BC
27	El Salvador	Suchitoto City	Suchitoto, Cuscatlán	16th century
28	Ethiopia	Mentewab-Qwesqwam Palace	Gondar	18th century
29	Fiji	Levuka Township	Levuka	1830–1925
30	France	'Galerie des Actions de Monsieur le Prince'	Chateau of Chantilly, Chantilly	1560–1897
31	Gambia	James Island	James Island	460–1860
32	Georgia	Tbilisi Historic District	Tbilisi	6th century–Present
33	Hungary	Spa Center Historic Ensemble	Balatonfüred	1790–1880
34	India	Ahmedabad Walled City	Ahmedabad	1411–Present
35	India	Jaisalmer Fort	Jaisalmer, Rajasthan	12th century
36	Israel	Gemeindehaus	German Colony, Haifa	1869
37	Israel	Ramla White Mosque	Ramle Municipality	9th century
38	Italy	Ancient Pompeii	Naples	1st century BC–AD 79
39	Italy	Arch of Trajan	Ancona	AD 115
40	Italy	Botanical Garden of University of Padua	Padua	1545
41	Italy	Etruscan Painted Tombs of Tarquinia	Tarquinia	7th century BC–2nd century BC
42	Italy	Limonaia at Boboli Gardens and Gardens of Villa Medici at Castello	Florence	1777–1778 and 1577
43	Italy	Basilica Neopitagorica	Rome	1st century
44	Italy	Palazzo Doria Pamphilj	Valmontone	Mid–17th century
45	Italy	Rupestrian churches of Apulia and the City of Matera	Apulia and City of Matera	1000–1753
46	Italy	Terra del Sole prison cells	Castrocaro Terme and Terra del Sole	Mid–16th century
47	Jamaica	Old Iron Bridge	Spanish Town, St. Catherine	1800
48	Jordan	Petra Archaeological Site	Wadi Mousa	1st–6th century
49	Laos	Vat Sisaket	Vientiane	1819–25
50	Latvia	Abava Valley Cultural Landscape	Kurzeme	13th–19th century
51	Lebanon	Enfeh	Enfeh (near Tripoli)	2nd millennium BC–13th century AD
52	Lithuania	Vilnius Town Hall	Vilnius	1503–22
53	Malaysia	Kampung Cina River Frontage	Kuala Terengganu	Late 19th–early 20th century
54	Malta	Mnajdra Prehistoric Temples	Mnajdra	3600 BC–2500 BC
55	Mexico	Carolina Hacienda (Main House)	Chihuahua	1896
56	Mexico	Madera Cave Dwellings	Madera, Chihuahua	6th century–7th century AD
57	Mexico	Metropolitan Cathedral	Mexico City	1573–1813
58	Mexico	Monasteries of San Juan Bautista Tetela del Volcan and Tlayacapan	Morelos	16th century
59	Mexico	Palace of Fine Arts	Mexico City	1904–1934
60	Mexico	Teotihuacan Archaeological Site	San Juan Teotihuacan	100 BC–AD 750
61	Mexico	Vega de la Peña Archaeological Site	Filo-Bobos, Veracruz	Before 1400
62	Mongolia	Bogd Khan Palace Museum	Ulaanbaatar	1893–1903
63	Nepal	Gombas of Upper Mustang	Lo Manthang, Mustang	15th century
64	Norway	Wooden Architecture of Trondheim	Trondheim Region	1850–1890
65	Pakistan	Uch Monument Complex	Uch, Bahawalpur District, Punjab Province	ca 2nd millennium BC–mid–16th century AD
66	Panama	San Lorenzo Castle and San Geronimo Fort	Colon and Portobelo	1595–1779 and 1653–1760
67	Peru	Apurlec Archaeological Site	Motupe, Lambayeque	7th century AD–14th century
68	Peru	La Quinta Heeren	Lima	1888–1930
69	Peru	"Ransom Room"	Cajamarca	1430–1460
70	Philippines	Kabayan Mummy Caves	Kabayan, Benguet	2nd millennium BC–2nd century AD
71	Philippines	San Sebastian Basilica	Manila	1886–1891
72	Poland	Debno Parish Church	Nowy Targ	15th century
73	Poland	Vistulamouth Fortress	Gdańsk	1482–1800
74	Romania	Constantin Brâncuși's Endless Column	Târgu Jiu	1937–1938
75	Romania	Roman Catholic Church	Ghelinţa	13th century
76	Russia	Agate Pavilion of the Catherine Palace	Tsarskoye Selo, Saint Petersburg	1780–1787
77	Russia	Alexander Palace	Tsarskoye Selo, Saint Petersburg	1792–1796
78	Russia	Irkutsk Historic Center	Irkoutsk	1770–1799
79	Russia	Paanajarvi Village	Kemi Province	14th century–Present
80	Russia	Russakov Club	Moscow	1929
81	Russia	Yelagin Island Palace and Park Ensemble	Saint Petersburg	1780–1826
82	Slovakia	Hell House	Banská Štiavnica	1500–1850
83	Spain	Windmills of Mallorca	Balearic Islands	1600–1950
84	Turkey	Ani Archaeological Site	Ocarli Koyu, Kars	3rd–14th century
85	Turkey	Hagia Sophia	Istanbul	AD 532–563
86	Turkey	Patara Archaeological Site	Kas	3rd millennium BC–AD 1200
87	Uganda	Masaka Cathedral	Masaka, Kitovu Village	1927
88	Ukraine	Ancient Chersonesos	Sevastopol, Crimea	5th century BC–15th century AD
89	United Kingdom	Hadlow Tower	Tonbridge, England	1838–1840
90	United Kingdom	Mussenden Temple	Castlerock, Northern Ireland	1760–1799
91	United Kingdom	St. Francis Church and Monastery	Manchester, England	1863–1872
92	United Kingdom	The St. Vincent Street Church	Glasgow, Scotland	1857–1859
93	United States of America	Bodie State Historic Park	California	1859–1896
94	United States of America	Fort Apache	White Mountain, Apache Tribal Land, Arizona	1870–1922
95	United States of America	Lancaster County	Pennsylvania	1710–1945
96	United States of America	Mesa Verde National Park	Colorado	13th century
97	United States of America	South Pass Cultural Landscape	Wyoming	Mid–19th century
98	Venezuela	San Francisco Church	Coro, Falcon	1720–1887
99	Vietnam	My Son Temple District	Duy Xuyen District	3rd–12th century
100	Yemen	Shibam Historic City	Shibam	5th century

== Statistics by country/territory ==
The following countries/territories have multiple sites entered on the 1998 Watch List, listed by the number of sites:

Number of sites	Country/Territory
9	Italy
7	Mexico
6	Russia
5	United States of America
4	Czech Republic and United Kingdom
3	Belgium, China, Peru and Turkey
2	Bolivia, Chile, Croatia, India, Israel, Philippines, Poland and Romania

== Notes ==
A. Names and spellings used for the sites were based on the official 1998 Watch List as published.
B. The references to the sites' locations were based on the official 1998 Watch List as published.
