= Illimo District =

Coordinates: 6.4679°S 79.8699°W

Illimo District Distrito de Íllimo
- District
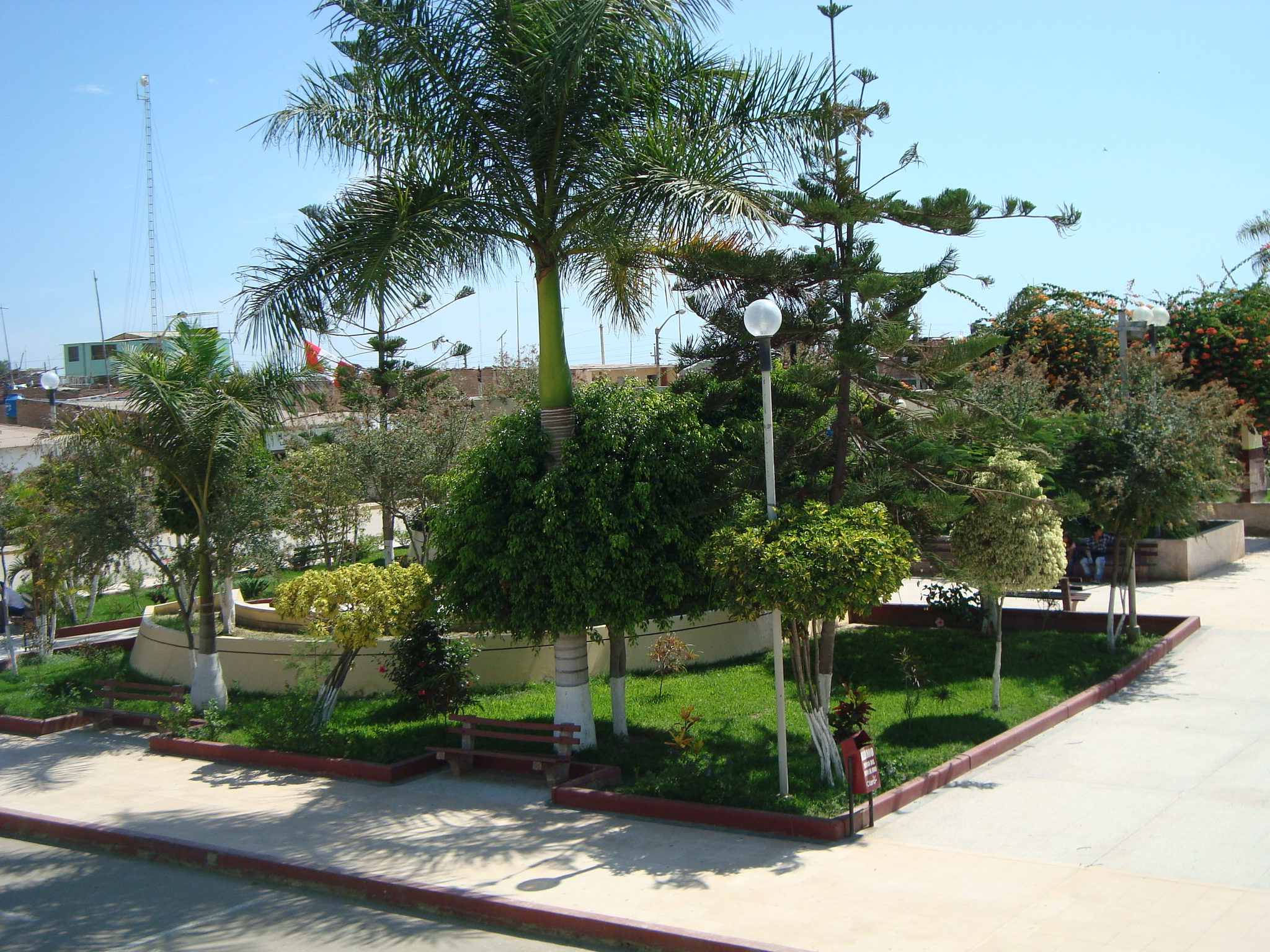
- Main square of Illimo
- Interactive map of Illimo District
- Country: Peru
- Region: Lambayeque
- Province: Lambayeque
- Founded: November 22, 1905
- Capital: Illimo

Government
  - Mayor: Juan Pablo Santamaria Baldera

Area
  - Total: 24.37 km^{2} (9.41 sq mi)
- Elevation: 51 m (167 ft)

Population (2005 census)
  - Total: 9,578
  - Density: 393.0/km^{2} (1,018/sq mi)
- Time zone: UTC-5 (PET)
- UBIGEO: 140303

Illimo District is one of twelve districts of the province Lambayeque in Peru.

The district of Illimo is one of twelve districts in the Lambayeque Region of northern Peru. Its origin dates back to the Moche (culture) during the Early Intermediate Cultural periods of Peru. The city is known for the sacrificial knife, the Tumi, that was discovered in the Batán Grande Reserved Zone by archeologist, Julio C. Tello, in 1936. More recently in 1996, archeologist, Walter Alva, found the tomb of Guillermo of Illimo, that included the first discovery of Lambayeque clothing which, at the time, had only been known based on iconography depicted on previously excavated pottery. In Peru, Illimo is also considered the Bee Honey Capital for its abundant supply of honey.

== Geography ==
Illimo is located 23 miles north of the city of Chiclayo. The area of the district is 41.82 square miles. The total population stands at 9,307 (according to the 2007 census) with a population density of 142 inhabitants per square mile. The town of Illimo is the capital of the district, which lies between Motupe River and The Milk River off the Chilayo Chachapoyas throughway. The terrain is mostly flat with few hills and dunes. Its economy is mainly dependent on livestock, cultivation of corn, kidney beans and alfalfa, and beekeeping.

The climate is largely determined by the oscillation of El Niño, with a minimum temperature of 59 °F and a maximum of 64.4 °F in the winter, and a minimum temperature of 71.6 °F and a maximum of 96.8 °F in the summer.

== History ==
Illimo resides in an area of Peru where historical accounts take root in etiological myths. According to legend, the Lambayeque region was founded by the mythological Naymlap, who led a crew of nine foreign warriors into northern Peru, on a fleet made of Balsa rafts.

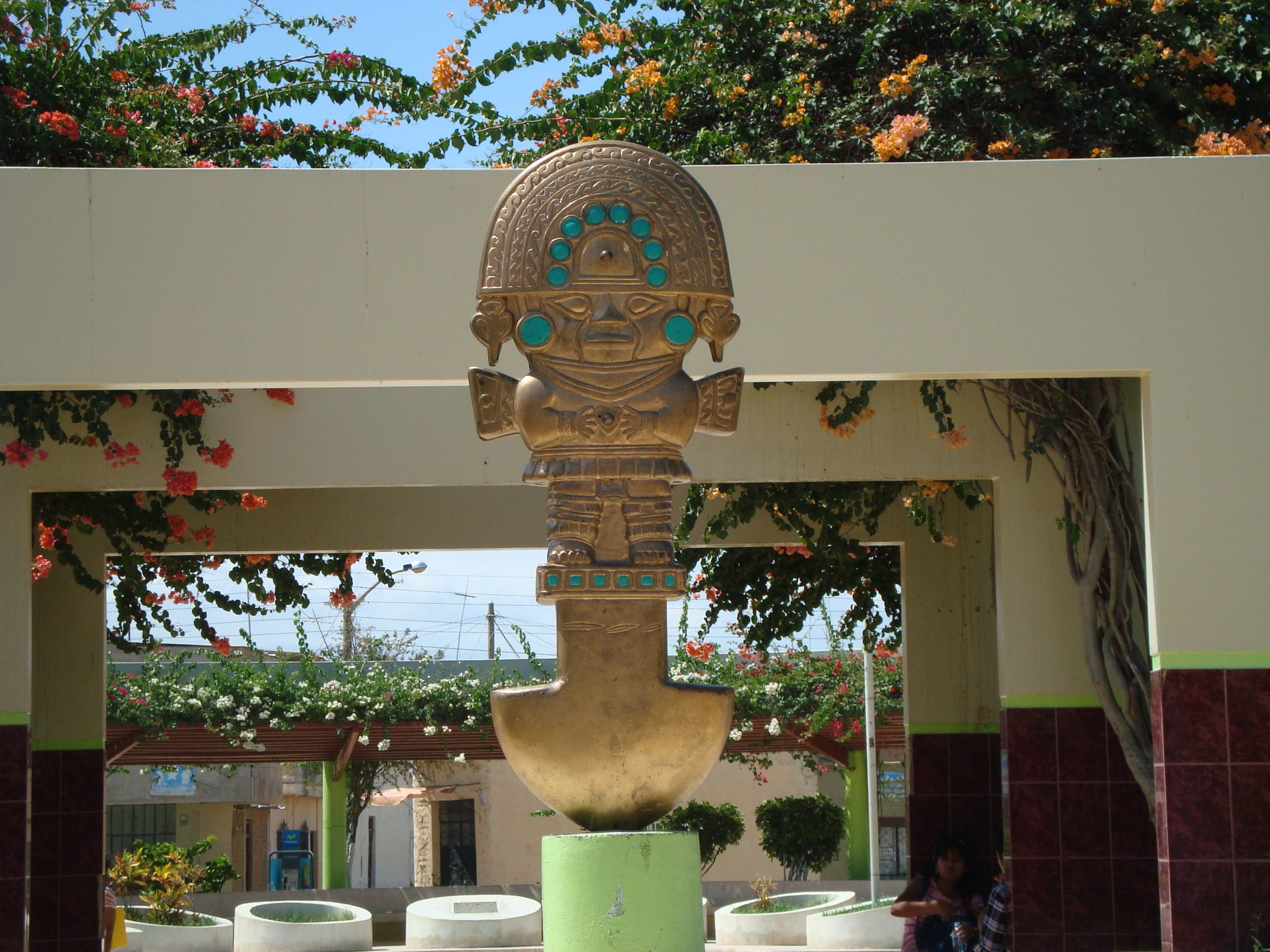
Replica of the Íllimo Tumi in Íllimo town square; the original artifact was stolen and destroyed in 1981.

By the early hundreds AD the area that would become the district of Illimo, belonged to the Moche. Several centuries later, the same territory would belong to the Chimú culture, beginning around 900 AD; on the cusp the Middle Horizon and Late Intermediate period. The Chimú would rule the vast coastal territory of northern Peru for almost 600 years until 1470 AD when they would be displaced by an Inca invasion led by ruler Tupac Inca Yupanqui. A second leader named Huayna Capac took over the nearly four decade conquest after Yupanqui.

Illimo would have made up Inca territory until 1532 AD when Spanish Conquistador, Francisco Pizarro, lead a conquest against the Inca. During this time, Manco Inca Yupanqui, the son of Huayna Capac, would first facilitate Pizarro's conquest. After extensive mistreatment by the Pizarro brothers, Manco Inca Yupani gathered an army of 200,000 Inca warriors in an unsuccessful attempt to dispose of the Spanish.

After 1582 Illimo was governed by a commissioner named Juán de Roldan. In 1590, it acquired its Christian named after the idol Saint John of Illimo. Later in 1601, the territory of Illimo expanded, and the Saint Estanislao Market made Illimo and in important commercial center that included 300 Indian grocers. Over two centuries later, in 1821, Illimo joined the Lambayeque party, and became an independent town.

In 1823, the Region of Lambayeque was established as a republican province. In 1824, Simon Bolivar would strip Illimo of its independence, adding the territory to the district of Mochumi. Years later in 1894, the marshall Andres Avelino Caceres, created the legal jurisdiction of Tucume, that annexed Illimo. Finally, on the 22 of November, 1905, Illimo once again gained its independence as a legally established district of the Lambayeque Region of Peru.

== Customs ==
Because Illimo is considered the Bee Honey Capital, every year the town celebrates its abundant hives with the Bee Man contest. In this competition men compete to cover themselves with as many honey bees as possible. On record, participants have carried a total of 20 thousand bees on their body without any protection. Starting in 2011, Illimo added the Bee Woman contest so women could be included in the competition.

Since 1878, the town of Illimo has held a festival in honor of the Child God of Kings, Jesus Christ, on the 4th, 5th and 6th of every January. It's a traditional festival where ancient customs of Lambayeque are practiced in a Catholic setting.
