= Lambayeque =

Lambayeque originates from "Llampayec", an idol that was worshipped in northern Peru, and can refer to:

- Lambayeque, Peru, a city
- Lambayeque District
- Lambayeque Province
- Lambayeque Region
- Lambayeque or Sican culture
