= Pocra culture =

Designation to the ancient Huari settlers of Huamanga before the Inca conquest

Pocras (called Pacora and Pocora in colonial documentation) were the ancient Wari culture (Spanish: Huari) inhabitants of the modern-day city of Huamanga, Peru before the Spanish conquest of the Inca Empire, bounded on the northwest by the Warivilcas, and on the southeast by the Rucanas and the Soras and on the east by the Mayonmarka near the Andahuaylas in La Mar (Chungui) in the current Peruvian province of Ayacucho. This culture was developed in the Middle Horizon and Late Intermediate cultural periods of Peru, from about CE 500 to 1000. Culturally the Pocras were outstanding in pottery, especially that found in Conchopata, Akuchimay, and behind Los Caballitos on the banks of Piñawa, Tenería or contemporary Alameda.

== History ==
=== Origin ===
==== Ethnolinguistics origin ====
With no accurate data on the origin of the Pocras, the study of ethnolinguistics has deduced a history based on the fact that the dominant language family of the Pocras language was Proto-Aymara or "Ara". All the regional languages of coastal origin are accepted as "Aka" and those of Andean (sierra) origin as "Ara". Given that the Pocras linguistic origin is "Ara" (Aymara), it is accepted that the Pocras are of mountain origin.

==== Distribution ====
The Pocras were inseparable allies of the Hanan Chancas ethnic group. Data on the origin of the Hanan Chancas, or Kingdom of Parkos, shows the entire ethnic population lived in ayllus along the Ankoyagu River (currently called the Mantaro River) giving the ayllus the name of Ankuyaku or "Anko ayllus". In their heyday the Pocras (also called the Pacora) extended into Peru's north coast and settled in the valleys of Jayanca and Pacora. After losing the war with the Quechuas of Cusco, some elite groups of the Pocras fled to the jungle of northeastern Peru where they built several centers, especially in cities of Lamas and Tarapoto in the San Martín Region of Peru.

==== Two ethnic groups ====
It is necessary to distinguish the two ethnic groups of the Chancas that were noted by the Spanish chroniclers, particularly Juan de Betanzos. The Uran Chankas of Andahuaylas, who are not ethnically linked with Parkos, were "underlings" or servants of the Hanan Chankas of Parkos. The Uran Chankas on the other hand surrendered peacefully to the Incan conquest. There was no term "Pocra-Chanca Confederation" at the time, as the Pocras were not only allied with the Hanan Chancas, but also the Wankas and the Ankaras who carried out attacks on the city of Cuzco — with the participation of the "Aukas" (sinchis), a warrior strain of Pocras in the city.

=== Inclusion in the Inca Empire ===
The Inca Empire, in the military campaign of the Incan ruler Pachacútec (Pachacuti Inca Yupanqui), once defeated the Pocra-Chanca army in the territory adjacent to Cusco, after taking the neighboring chiefdoms into submission thus strengthening the empire. Then he tried to annex the surrounding country with the Chancas as well as the Soras, the Rucanas, and the Pocras. Pachacutec left the city of Cusco in the hands of his brother Lloque Yupanqui while on the campaign against the Soras. The campaign left the area of the Soras split into three armies. One of which was commanded by Apo Conde Mayta circled the Pocras in Vilcas and reached Parkos, located northwest of the current city of Ayacucho, Peru. Once in Parkos, the Incas took into submission the Vilcos, the Morochucos, the Pocras, and the Iquichanos.

The conquest of the Pocras region was bloody, but the Incas kept a small Pocras entity with an administrator named Simi Auka that lasted until the Spanish colonial era. After subjecting the Rucanas (now the Lucanas), Pachacútec directed his attention to Pacora, the place of refuge of the Pocras and the Soras. As the resistance was lengthy, he tried to lure them with prizes and privileges, but they mocked the messengers by shooting rocks at them with slingshots. Then Pachacutec sought to control them by creating food and water shortages, and in time the Pocras and the Soras had to surrender, promising to pay tribute and acknowledge allegiance to the lord of Cusco — promises that would not be fulfilled due to various rebellions of the Pocras.

Since then, the Incans formed the provinces of Parkos whose administrative center was Paukaray (former seat of Hanan Chancas), Guamanka (Pacora Quimpo) whose center was Guaman Qocha (currently Quinua or Quimpo), Ankaras, Chukrupus, and Rukanas whose administrative center was Vilcashuamán. Since it was such a vast territory, the colony was divided into Lucanas, which had no capital (much later the capitol was San Juan de Lucanas), and Vilcashuamán with the same capital that exist to this day.

== See also ==
- Ayacucho
- Chanaquos
- Felipe Guamán Poma de Ayala
- Inca Empire
- Kichwa-Lamista people
- San Martín Region
- Tarapoto
- Vilcashuamán
