= 2006 World Monuments Watch =

Nonprofit advocacy program in New York, US

The World Monuments Watch is a flagship advocacy program of the New York-based private non-profit organization World Monuments Fund (WMF) that is dedicated to preserving the historic, artistic, and architectural heritage around the world.

== Selection process ==
Every two years, it publishes a select list known as the Watch List of 100 Most Endangered Sites that is in urgent need of preservation funding and protection. The sites are nominated by governments, conservation professionals, site caretakers, non-government organizations (NGOs), concerned individuals, and others working in the field. An independent panel of international experts then select 100 candidates from these entries to be part of the Watch List, based on the significance of the sites, the urgency of the threat, and the viability of both advocacy and conservation solutions. For the succeeding two-year period until a new Watch List is published, these 100 sites can avail grants and funds from the WMF, as well as from other foundations, private donors, and corporations by capitalizing on the publicity and attention gained from the inclusion on the Watch List.

== 2006 Watch List ==
The 2006 World Monuments Watch List of 100 Most Endangered Sites was launched on June 21, 2005, by WMF President Bonnie Burnham. It marked the first time that an entire country was placed on the Watch List. Iraq, long considered as the "cradle of human civilization" and within whose borders lie an estimated 10,000 archaeological sites, has been left vulnerable to widespread looting, vandalism, and other acts of violence in the wake of the 2003 military invasion.

The World Monuments Watch provides a valuable barometer of the state of heritage preservation worldwide… The biennial Watch list tells us not only which sites are in peril, but also what kinds of threats—natural disaster, war, pollution, neglect, or other issues—are endangering the world's heritage.

— Bonnie Burnham, WMF president, launch of 2006 Watch List

On October 6, 2005, nearly four months after the publication of the 2006 Watch List and more than a month after the significant devastation brought about by Hurricane Katrina on America's Gulf Coast, the WMF, together with partners American Express Foundation and National Trust for Historic Preservation, decided to place the Gulf Coast and New Orleans as the 101st endangered site on the 2006 Watch List.

=== List by country/territory ===
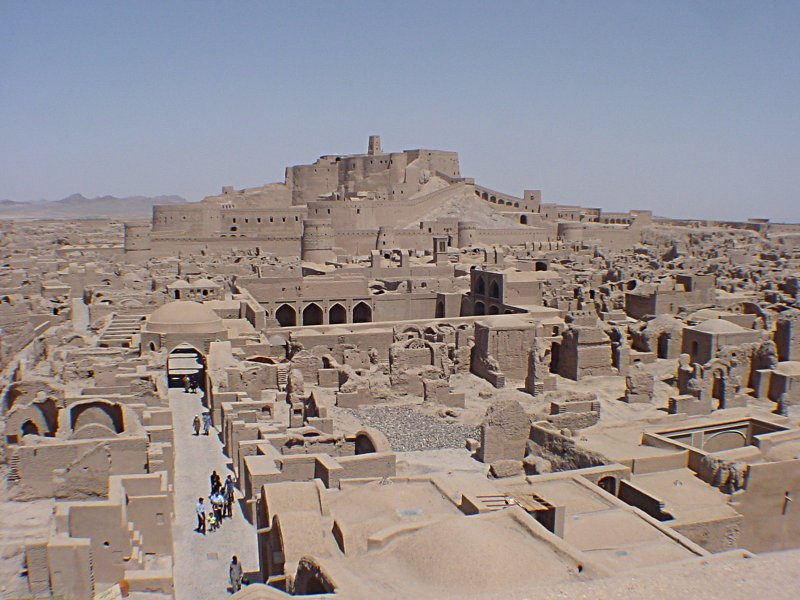
The mudbrick structures of the Iranian city of Bam were severely damaged by an earthquake in 2003. It was subsequently inscribed on the UNESCO World Heritage List and List of World Heritage in Danger in 2004, and on the WMF Watch List in 2006.

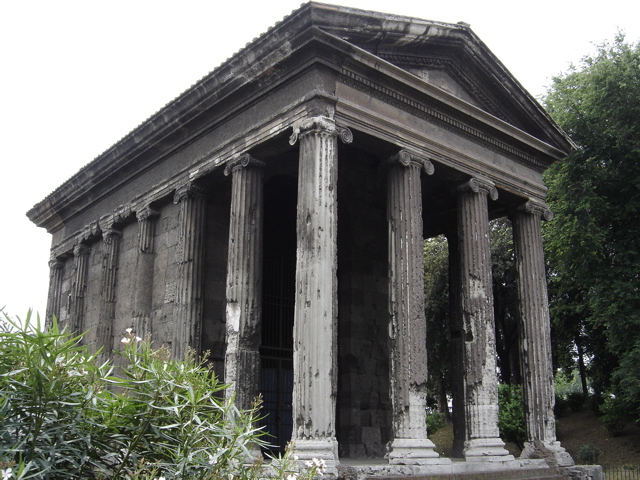
Rome's Temple of Portunus is one of the best preserved early Roman temples in the world.

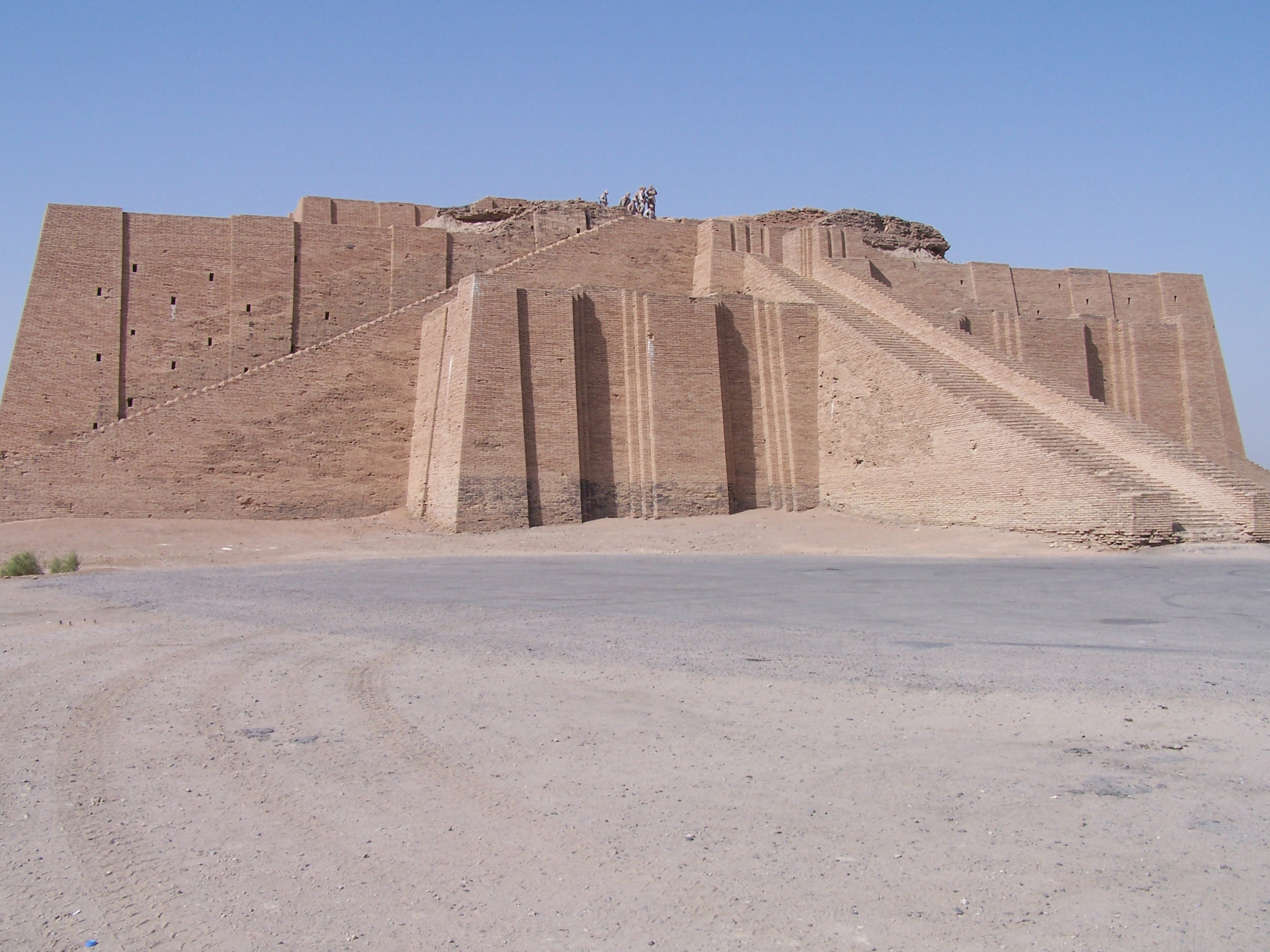
The Great Ziggurat of Ur is one of the many archaeological sites in Iraq that has been left vulnerable to looting and vandalism since the invasion and occupation began in 2003.

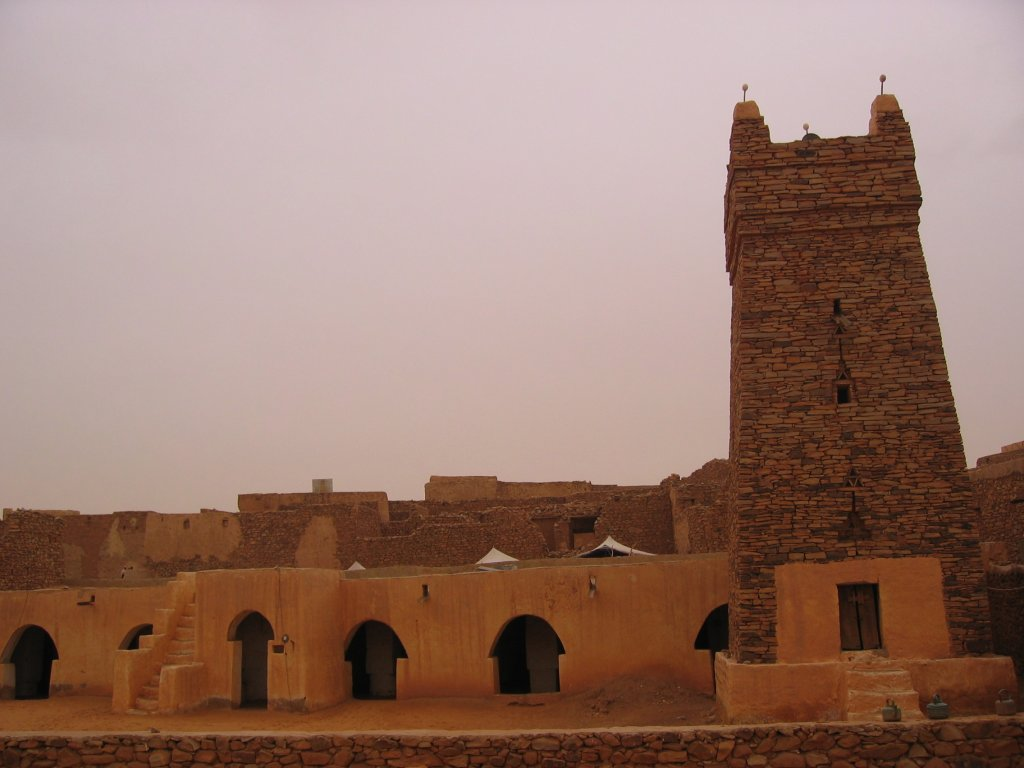
Mauritania's Chinguetti Mosque is home to a unique collection of important Islamic manuscripts. It is situated in Chinguetti, considered as the "seventh city" of Islam.

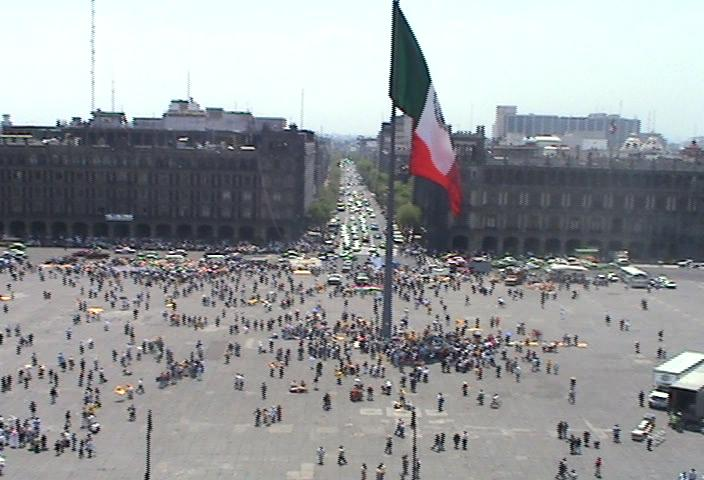
Seismic instability and the depletion of its aquifer has endangered the very foundation of Mexico City.

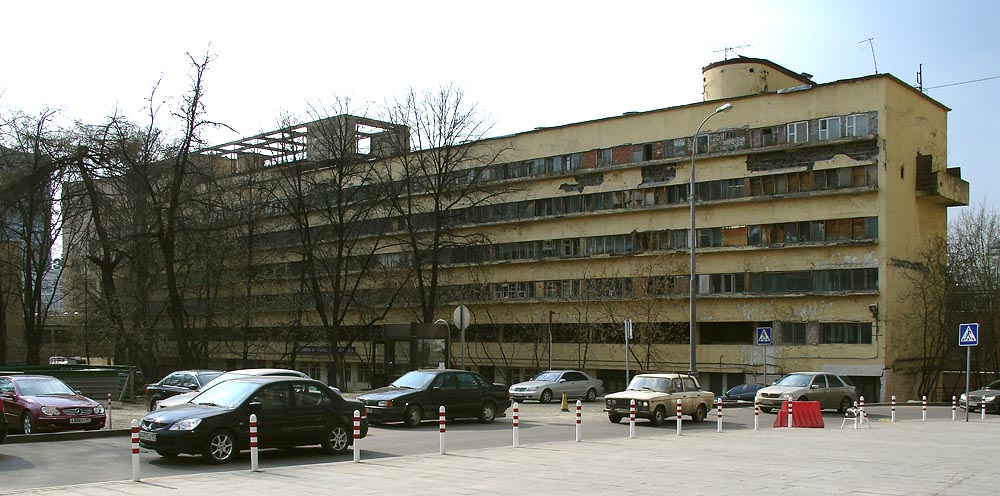
Moscow's Narkomfin Building is a nationally listed monument in Russia and continues to inspire architects around the world.

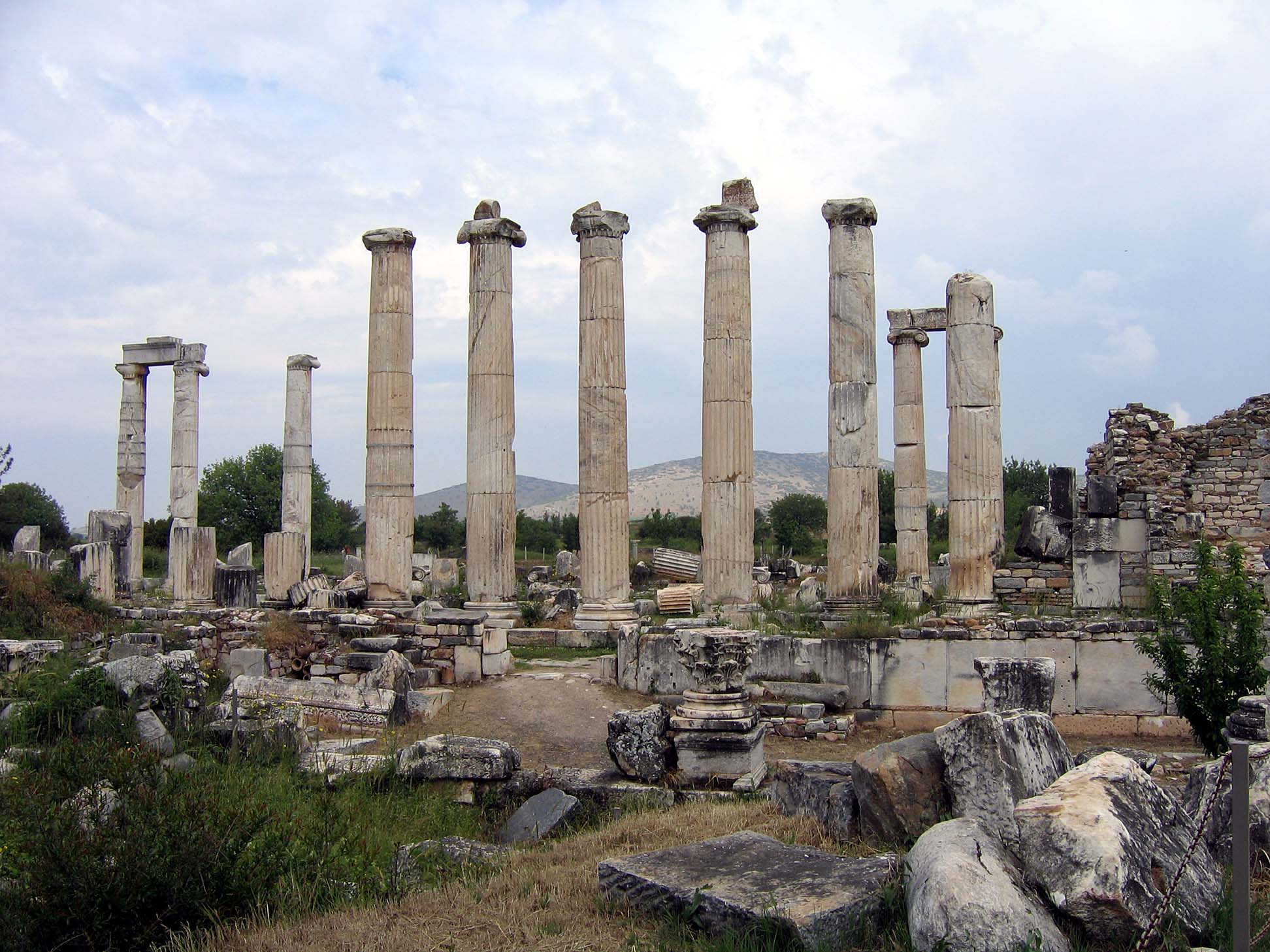
The Turkish archaeological site of Aphrodisias features some of the best-preserved examples of Greco-Roman architecture in the eastern Mediterranean.

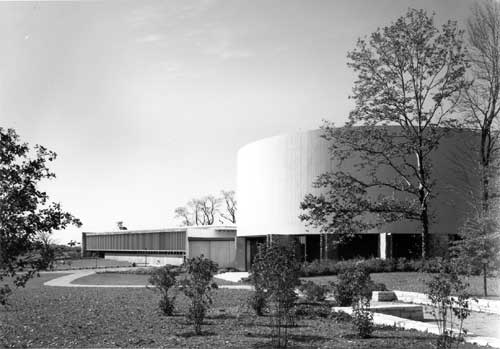
Pennsylvania's Cyclorama Building was included on the Watch List since the structure was slated for demolition by the authorities. The building was demolished in March 2013.

Number^{[A]}	Country/Territory	Site^{[B]}	Location^{[C]}	Period^{[C]}
1	Afghanistan	Haji Piyada Mosque	Balkh	9th century
2	Antarctica	Sir Ernest Shackleton's Expedition Hut	Cape Royds, Ross Island	1908
3	Australia	Dampier Rock Art Complex	Dampier, Burrup Peninsula	10,000 BC–present
4	Bangladesh	Sonargaon-Panam City	Sonargaon	15th–19th centuries
5	Bosnia and Herzegovina	Mehmed-Pasha Sokolovic Bridge	Višegrad	1571–1577
6	Brazil	Convent of San Francisco and Historic Olinda	Olinda, Pernambuco	1535–1827
7	Cameroon	Bafut Palace	Bafut	1907–1910
8	Cape Verde	Tarrafal Concentration Camp	Tarrafal	1930s
9	Chile	Tulor Village	Antofagasta	500 BC–AD 300
10	Chile	Cerros Pintados	Tarapacá	500–1450
11	China	Cockcrow Post Town	Cockrow Post, Huailai	1420
12	China	Lu Mansion	Dong Yang	15th–19th centuries
13	China	Qikou Town	Shanxi Province	18th–19th centuries
14	China	Stone Towers of Southwest China	Various Locations	ca. 1000–1500
15	China	Tianshui Traditional Houses	Tianshui, Qincheng, Gansu	1644–1929
16	China	Tuanshan Historical Village	Yunnan Province	15th–19th centuries
17	Croatia	Novi Dvori Castle	Zaprešić	Mid–19th century
18	Croatia	Saint Blaise Church	Dubrovnik	1707–1717
19	Cuba	Finca Vigia (Hemingway's House)	San Francisco de Paula	1886
20	Egypt	Sabil Ruqayya Dudu	Cairo	1761
21	Egypt	Tarabay al-Sharify	Cairo	16th century
22	Egypt	West Bank	Luxor	1540–1075 BC
23	El Salvador	San Miguel Arcangel and Santa Cruz de Roma	Panchimalco & Huizucar	1730–1740
24	Eritrea	Asmara Historic City Center	Asmara	1916–1941
25	Eritrea	Kidane-Mehret Church	Senafe	12th century
26	Eritrea	Massawa Historic Town	Massawa	16th–19th centuries
27	Finland	Helsinki-Malmi Airport	Helsinki	1930–1938
28	Georgia	Jvari Monastery	Mtshekta	ca. 600
29	Greece	Helike Archaeological Site	Achaia	BC 2500–500
30	Guatemala	Naranjo	El Petén	600–900
31	India	Dalhousie Square	Kolkata	1600–1699; 1900
32	India	Dhangkar Gompa	Himachal Pradesh	15th–16th centuries
33	India	Guru Lhakhang and Sumda Chung Temples	Sumda Chung	11th–14th centuries
34	India	Watson's Hotel	Mumbai	1867–1871
35	Indonesia	Omo Hada	Nias Island	1715
36	Iran	Bam	Bam	10th–18th centuries
37	Iraq	Iraq Cultural Heritage Sites	Country-wide	Prehistoric–present
38	Ireland	Wonderful Barn	Kildare	1743
39	Italy	Academy of Hadrian's Villa	Tivoli	2nd century
40	Italy	Cimitero Acattolico	Rome	1776 first burial
41	Italy	Civita di Bagnoregio	Bagnoregio	12th–15th centuries
42	Italy	Murgia dei Trulli	Murgia dei Trulli	ca. 800
43	Italy	Portici Royal Palace	Naples	1740–19th century
44	Italy	Santa Maria in Stelle Hypogeum	Verona	3rd–5th centuries
45	Italy	Temple of Portunus	Rome	Late 2nd–1st centuries BC
46	Kenya	Mtwapa Heritage Site	Kilifi, Mtwapa	1100–1199
47	Laos	Chom Phet Cultural Landscape	Luang Prabang	19th century
48	Latvia	Riga Cathedral	Riga	13th–19th centuries
49	Lebanon	Chehabi Citadel	Hasbaya	12th century
50	Lebanon	International Fairground at Tripoli	Tripoli	1963
51	Macedonia	Treskavec Monastery and Church	Treskavec	12th–15th centuries
52	Mauritania	Chinguetti Mosque	Chinguetti	13th century
53	Mexico	Chalcatzingo	Morelos	800 BC
54	Mexico	Mexico City Historic Center	Mexico City	15th–20th centuries
55	Mexico	Pimería Alta Missions	Sonora	1700–1799
56	Mexico	San Juan Bautista Cuauhtinchan	Puebla	1528–1544
57	Mexico	San Nicolás Obispo	Morelia, Michoacán	16th–18th centuries
58	Nepal	Patan Royal Palace Complex	Patan	17th–19th centuries
59	Nigeria	Benin City Earthworks	Edo State	1240–1460
60	Norway	Sandviken Bay	Bergen	18th–19th centuries
61	Pakistan	Mian Nasir Mohammed Graveyard	Dadu District	18th century
62	Pakistan	Thatta Monuments	Thatta	14th–18th centuries
63	Palestinian Territories	Tell Balatah (Shechem or Ancient Nablus)	Nablus, West Bank	BC 1699–AD 1600
64	Panama	Panama Canal Area	Panama City, Chagres River	1882–1914
65	Peru	Cajamarquilla	Lima	500–1200
66	Peru	Presbítero Maestro Cemetery	Lima	1805–1808
67	Peru	Quinta Heeren	Lima	1888–1930
68	Peru	Revash Funerary Complex	Santo Tomás	10th century
69	Peru	Túcume Archaeological Site	Lambayeque	9th–15th centuries
70	Poland	Jerusalem Hospital of the Teutonic Order	Malborka	14th century; 17th century
71	Poland	Mausoleum of Karol Scheibler	Łódź	1885–1888
72	Portugal	Teatro Capitólio	Lisbon	1925–1931
73	Romania	Oradea Fortress	Oradea	17th–18th centuries
74	Russia	Melnikov's House Studio	Moscow	1929
75	Russia	Narkomfin Building	Moscow	1928–1930
76	Russia	Semenovskoe-Otrada	Moscow Region	1774–1850s
77	Samoa	Pulemelei Mound	Palauli, Letolo Plantation	ca. 1000–1500
78	Serbia and Montenegro	Prizren Historic Center	Prizren	1200–present
79	Serbia and Montenegro	Subotica Synagogue	Subotica	1902
80	Sierra Leone	Old Fourah Bay College Building	Freetown	Mid–19th century
81	Slovakia	Lednické-Rovne Historical Park	Lednické-Rovne	18th century
82	South Africa	Richtersveld Cultural Landscape	Northern Cape Province	Prehistoric–present
83	Spain	Segovia Aqueduct	Segovia	1st century
84	Sudan	Suakin	Suakin Island	17th–18th centuries
85	Syria	Amrit Archaeological Site	Amrit	300–230 BC
86	Syria	Shayzar Castle	Shaizar	12th century
87	Syria	Tell Mozan (Ancient Urkesh)	Tell Mozan	ca. 2200–1500 BC
88	Turkey	Aphrodisias	Aphrodisias	150 BC–AD 1200
89	Turkey	Little Hagia Sophia	Istanbul	527–536
90	United Kingdom	Saint Mary's Stow Church	Stow, Lincolnshire	975 AD; 11th–15th centuries
91	United Kingdom	St. Vincent Street Church	Glasgow, Scotland	1857/59–1904
92	United States of America	2 Columbus Circle	New York City	1964
93	United States of America	Bluegrass Cultural Landscape of Kentucky	Central Kentucky	Late 18th–Early 19th centuries
94	United States of America	Cyclorama Center	Gettysburg, Pennsylvania	1958–1961
95	United States of America	Dutch Reformed Church	Newburgh, New York	1830
96	United States of America	Ellis Island Baggage and Dormitory Building	New York, New York	1908–1913
97	United States of America	Ennis Brown House	Los Angeles, California	1924
98	United States of America	Hanging Flume	Montrose County, Colorado	1887–1890
99	United States of America	Mount Lebanon Shaker Village	New Lebanon, New York	1860
100	Venezuela	La Guaira Historic City	Vargas	1589
101^{[D]}	United States of America	Gulf Coast and New Orleans	Mississippi and Louisiana	18th–20th centuries

== Statistics by country/territory ==
The following countries/territories have multiple sites entered on the 2006 Watch List, listed by the number of sites:

Number of sites	Country/Territory
9	United States of America^{[E]}
7	Italy
6	China
5	Mexico and Peru
4	India
3	Egypt, Eritrea, Russia and Syria
2	Chile, Croatia, Lebanon, Pakistan, Poland, Serbia & Montenegro, Turkey and United Kingdom

== Notes ==
A. No official reference numbers have been designated for the sites on the Watch List.
B. Names and spellings used for the sites were based on the official 2006 Watch List as published.
C. The references to the sites' locations and periods of construction were based on the official 2006 Watch List as published.
D. On October 6, 2005, the WMF added the historic and cultural assets of the Gulf Coast and New Orleans to the 2006 Watch List as its 101st site, in the aftermath of Hurricane Katrina significantly damaging and destroying numerous historic structures across the region.
E. Tally includes the Gulf Coast and New Orleans site.
