= Illimo =

Coordinates: 6°28′S 79°51′W

Illimo Íllimo
- locality
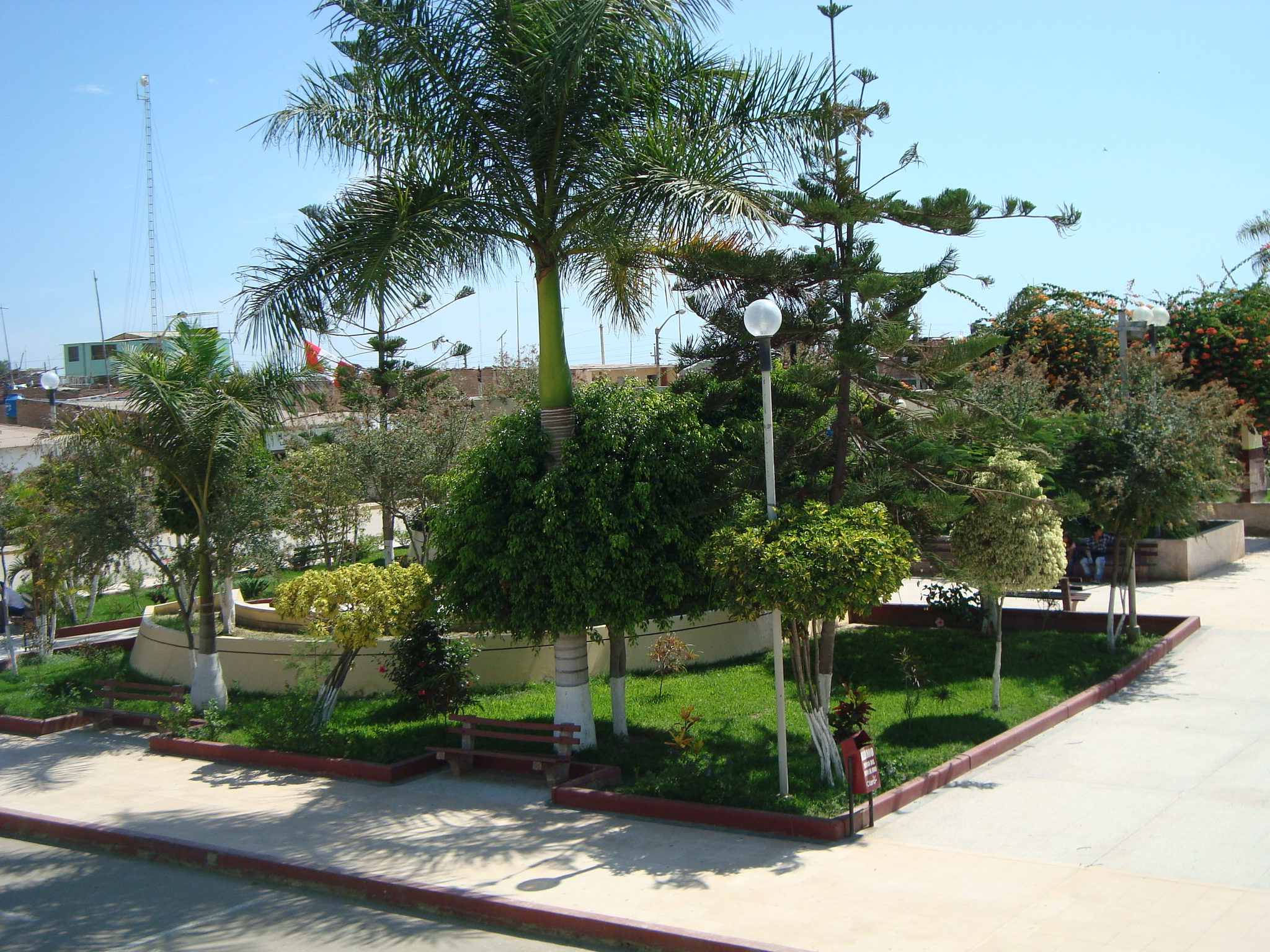
- Park in Illimo
- Interactive map of Illimo
- Country: Peru
- Region: Lambayeque
- Province: Lambayeque
- District: Illimo District

Illimo is a locality in Illimo District.
