= Aracely Quispe Neira =

Peruvian-American senior astronautical engineer

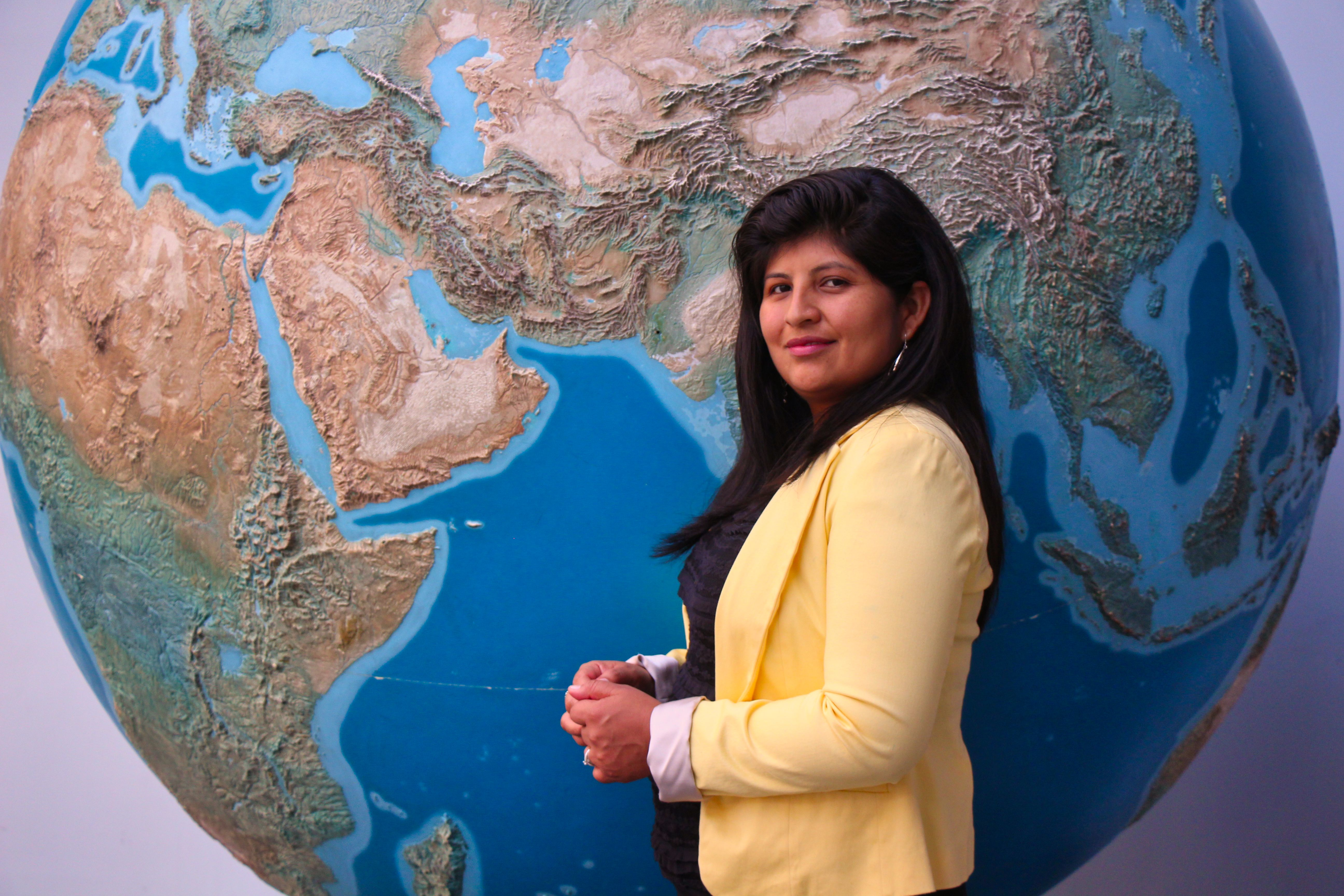
- Neira in 2015
- Born: Irma Aracely Quispe Neira; 18 August 1982 (age 44); Marripón, Motupe, Lambayeque, Peru
- Education: Prince George's Community College; Capitol Technology University; University of Maryland, College Park
- Scientific career
- Fields: Astronautical engineering, Aerospace engineering, Planetary science, Geospatial intelligence
- Workplaces: NASA, STScI
- Website: www.aracelyquispeneira.com

Irma Aracely Quispe Neira (born 18 August 1982; known as Aracely Quispe) is a Peruvian-American senior astronautical engineer, NASA scientist, academic and researcher. She is known as the first Latin-American woman to lead three successful NASA missions in the United States: Tropical Rainfall Measuring Mission (TRMM), the Lunar Reconnaissance Orbiter (LRO), and James Webb Space Telescope (JWST). Quispe has been a senior flight operations and systems engineer of the successful James Webb Space Telescope launching. She is an official speaker at the NASA and the United States Department of State, professor at Capitol Technology University, and STEM educator.

On April 12, 2023, she received from the Peruvian State the rank of Commander in Order of Merit for Distinguished Services.

== Early life and education ==
Irma Aracely Quispe was born in Marripón, a rural community in the Motupe District of Lambayeque, northern Peru, where there was no electricity. Her mother Irma Neira Samame was an educator. Her interest in space and science began, when she was six years old and saw Apollo 11 Mission's broadcast and Neil Armstrong walking on the Moon, which made her want to work at NASA.

In high school, Quispe began to practice shotokan karate, and obtained a black belt, while being a teenager. She became part of national team and competed in regional and international tournaments, traveling throughout South America and the United States.

Quispe graduated with a degree on Computer Science and Systems Engineering and at the age of 21 she moved to the United States, applying for a permanent residence due to "extraordinary ability”.

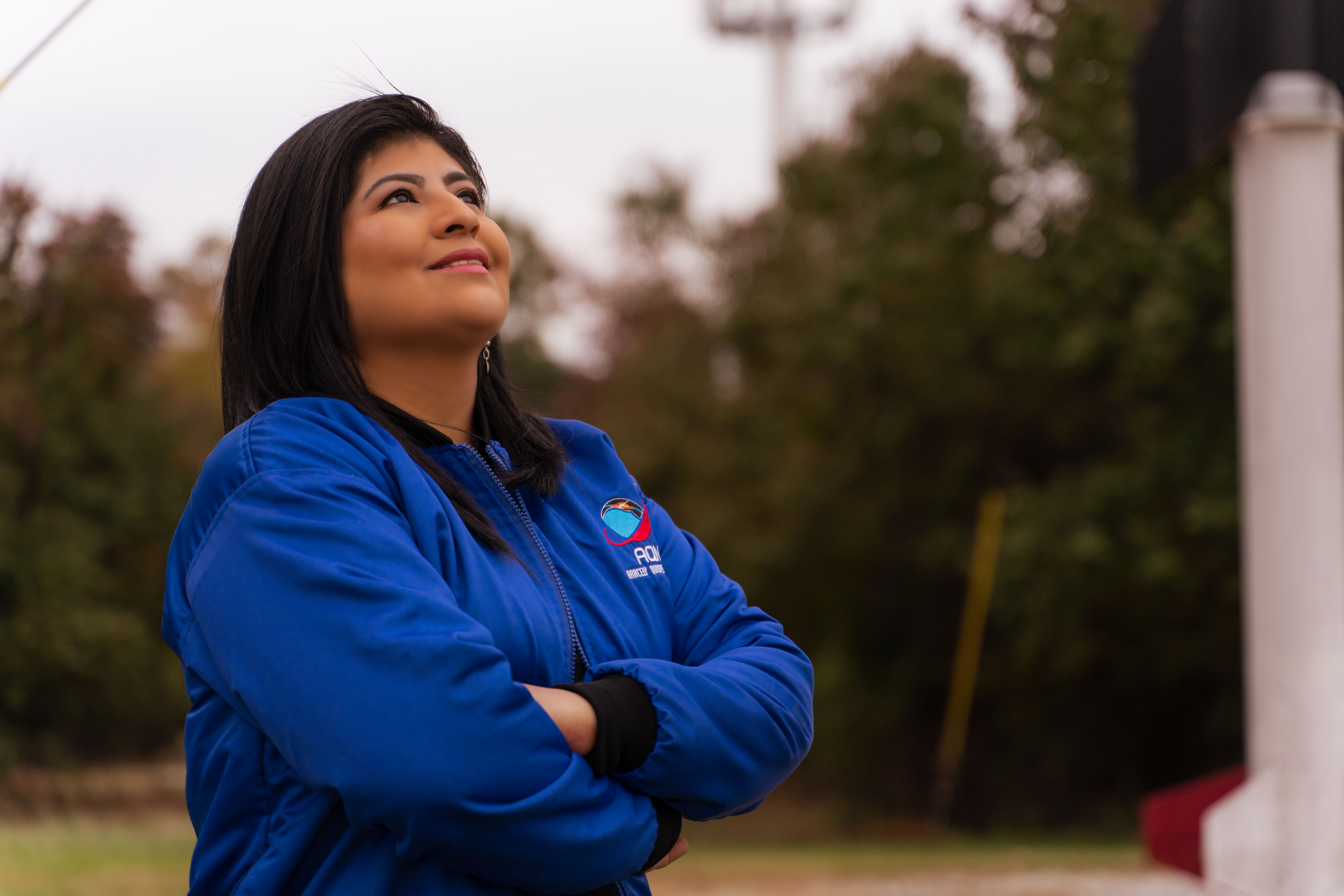
Aracely Quispe Neira at Goddard Space Flight Center

She enrolled at Space and Electrical Technology Engineering at Prince George's Community College in Maryland. An adviser at school suggested that to get into NASA, she had to continue her studies on Astronautical or Aerospace Engineering. Quispe followed the advice and transferred to the Capitol Technology University (CapTechU) to study Astronautics and specialize in construction, operation and monitoring of spacecraft.

As one of the best students at CapTechU, in 2011 Quispe did her internship at NASA in the Tropical Rainfall Measurement Mission (TRMM), starting as a Test Engineer, and later becoming Systems Engineer. After finishing the internship, Aracely won a scholarship to do a master's degree with a thesis on the melting of Quelccaya glacier in Cusco, Peru, using NASA satellite images. She has seven academic degrees, including a master's degree in Aeronautical Engineering from Capitol Technology University, an honorary Master's degree in Geospatial Intelligence from the University of Maryland and an honorary Doctorate of Science from Capitol Technology University focused on an investigation of communications security in GPS Satellites from malicious attacks.

== Career at NASA ==
In 2011, Quispe applied for the Lunar Reconnaissance Orbiter mission at the NASA Aerospace agency. She joined the LRO mission at the Goddard Space Flight Center as a systems engineer and in 2014 rose to team leader and the spaceflight operations leader.

In 2016, she entered the James Webb Space Telescope program, in which 17 countries and more than 3,000 scientists have collaborated.

Since 2014 she has headed the following missions: the Tropical Rainfall Measurement Mission (TRMM), the Lunar Reconnaissance Orbiter (LRO) and James Webb Space Telescope (JWST) that was launched into space in 2021 to replace the Hubble Space Telescope.

Quispe is a senior astronautical engineer, a leader in Space and Flight Operations at NASA, a senior flight systems operations engineer on the James Webb Space Telescope project and was part of the team that put it into orbit in 2021 to study the formation of galaxies.

Currently she is an official speaker for the NASA and the United States Department of State.

As a researcher Quispe investigated the deglaciation of the Andean snow-capped mountains in Cusco area of Peru through high-resolution satellite images. Her study contributed to raising awareness of deglaciation and its effects on global warming. An assistantship was provided by the National Science Foundation (NSF) for this scientist's research while she was earning a master's degree in Astronautical Engineering.

== STEM activism ==
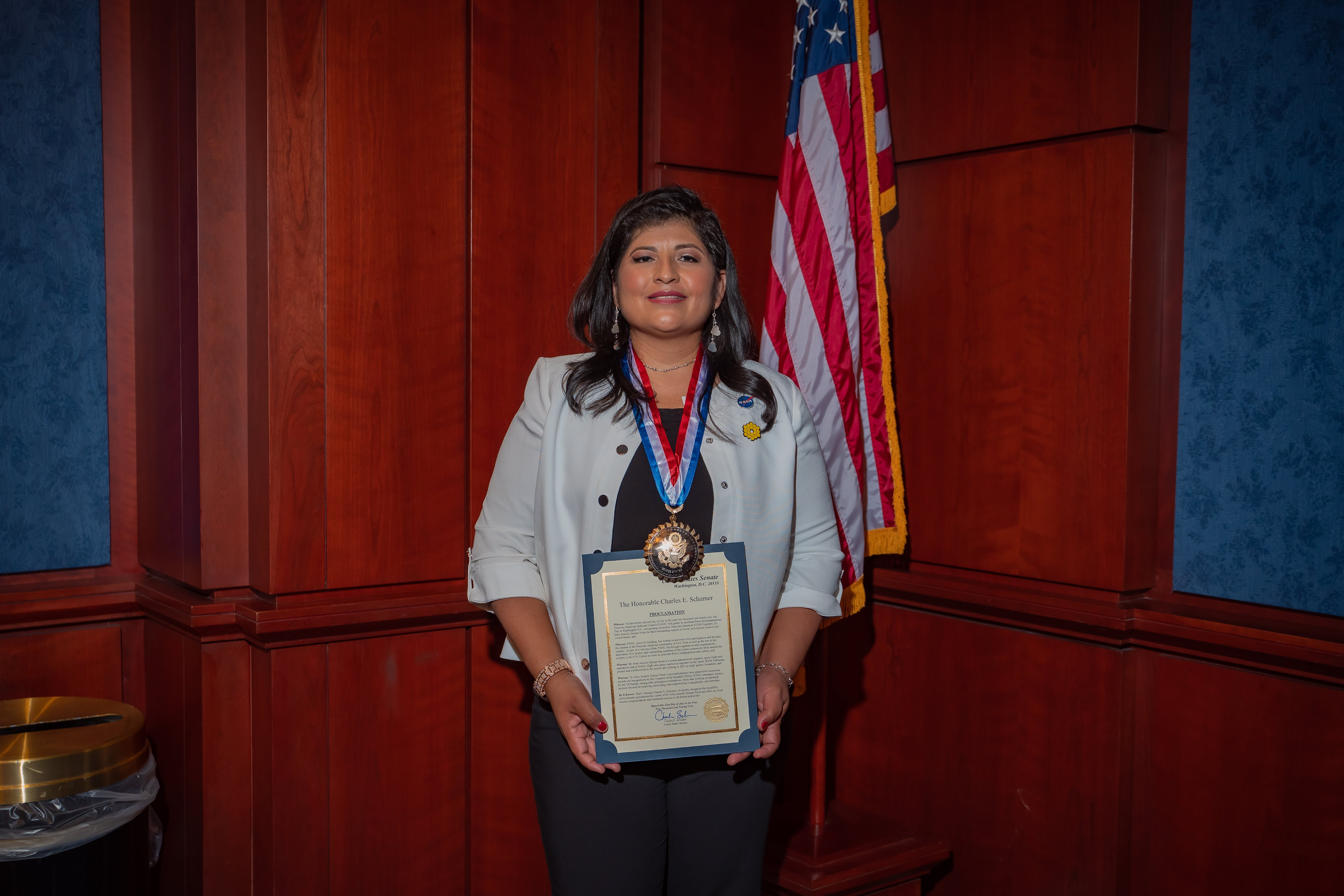
Aracely Quispe Neira at The US Senate, receiving Honorable Chuck Schumer proclamation, 2022

In 2014, Quispe started a personal project, AQN (from her name initials Aracely Quispe Neira), that promotes science, technology, engineering and mathematics (STEM) programs among women and young people in Latin America. The initiative aims to provide Hispanic girls opportunities to pursue technology studies and succeed in professions including education, research, and innovation. With the Department of State's Bureau of Educational and Cultural Affairs support, Quispe participated in international forums to increase Latin American student interest in aerospace industry.

In 2019, she launched and personally funded a project in her native Lambayeque. She visited 20 national schools and brought together nearly 3,500 high school students to motivate them undertake scientific research projects. She also visited Catholic schools of the Archdiocese of Washington St. Francis International (Maryland), Archbishop Carroll (District of Columbia) and St. Anthony (District of Columbia). The same year, Quispe participated in the Hay Festival Arequipa, where she brought together almost 1,000 young people to her presentations.

For her STEM work, the House of Representatives and Department of State honored her in 2019. In 2023 Forbes Peru named her "One of the 50 most powerful women in Peru in 2023".

== Awards and honors ==
- Diploma of Honor from the Congress of Peru – 2013
- National award "Lord of Sipán" from the Lambayeque Regional Council and Regional Government of Lambayeque – 2013
- Peruvian Consulate in Washington D.C. recognition – 2013
- TUMI Award – 2016
- US Senate Proclamation "for the great recognition and honor", Washington. Awarded by US Congresswoman Grace Meng – 2019
- NASA Senior Science Committee recognitions as "role model from Peru in NASA" – 2015, 2021
- Honorary Doctor of Science from Capitol Technology University – 2022
- The US Senate recognition for scientific work and professional career, including coordinating the launching of the "humanity's new great space observatory” James Web Space Telescope into orbit. Awarded by Chuck Schumer – 2022
- The International Gold Excellence Awards by the Peruvian American National Council, the United States – 2022
- Commander Degree in Order of Merit for Distinguished Services awarded by the Peruvian State, awarded to only 90 women in 72 years since its creation in 1951. Washington – 2023
- 2023 Outstanding Achievement Award from the NASA administration – 2023

== See also ==
- NASA
- James Webb Space Telescope
- STEM
