= Tulor =

Coordinates: 22°58′05″S 68°14′33″W

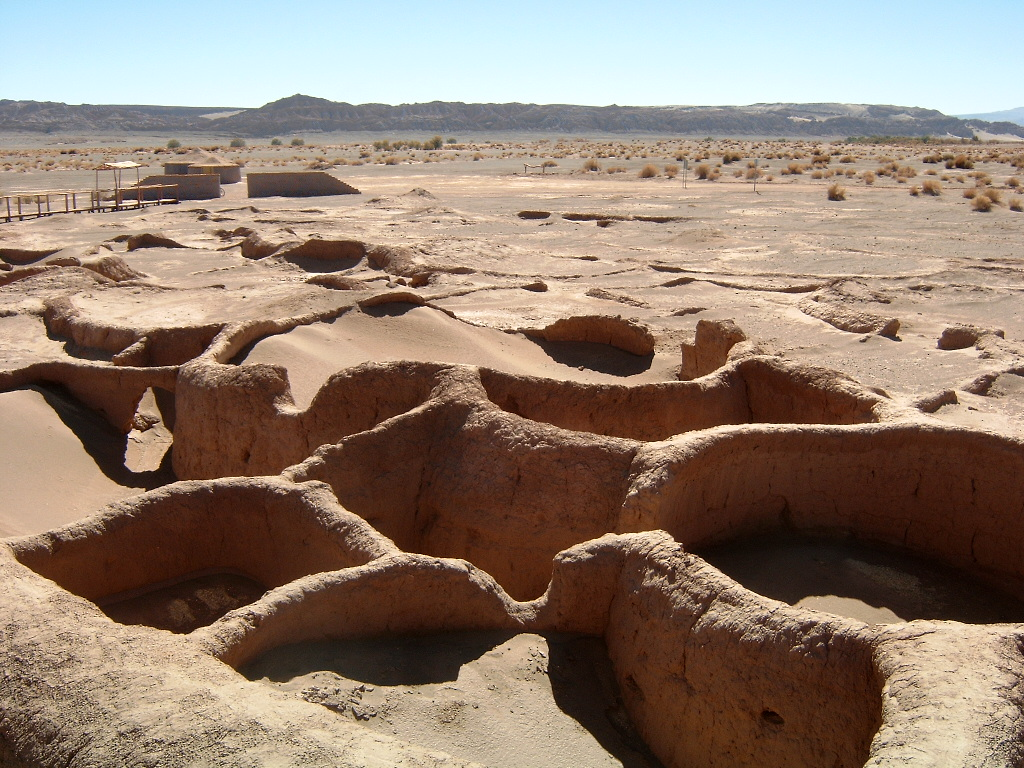
Remains of the Tulor settlement near San Pedro de Atacama

Tulor is an archaeological site located in the Norte Grande natural region of the Antofagasta Region, Chile near San Pedro de Atacama. The site is a former village complex with an area of 5,200 m^{2} (55,972 sq ft) and 22 outlying edifices. The settlement's remains are distributed in an east-west fashion along 2 km (1 mi). Radiocarbon and thermoluminescence dating date the origin of the settlement sometime between 380 BCE and 200 CE, but most structures are from the period 800 CE - 1200 CE. Architectural characteristics of Tulor are circular walls are made of mud and vaults. In 1998, the World Monuments Fund, an international non-profit organization, listed Tulor in the 1998 World Monuments Watch List of 100 Most Endangered Sites. After little was done to protect it, the site was re-listed in 2006.

Tulor discoveries consist of many items from boreholes to human remains. Boreholes are the circular walls made out of clay, dug into the earth to find water. In June 1974 archaeologists put the boreholes in order of stratigraphy so they can find out more about how the population disappeared that was once there. The stratigraphy helped in finding out why the population disappeared, which was not due by climatic changes but to an increase in drought. On site they found lithic, human bones, animal bones, ceramic, carbon, and seashells buried in the ground. All these artifacts are considered to be from the Mesolithic era.
