= Chochope District =

Coordinates: 6.1316°S 79.6573°W

Chochope
- District
- Interactive map of Chochope
- Country: Peru
- Region: Lambayeque
- Province: Lambayeque
- Founded: October 11, 1909
- Capital: Chochope

Government
  - Mayor: Cesar Augusto Castro Centurion

Area
  - Total: 79.27 km^{2} (30.61 sq mi)
- Elevation: 215 m (705 ft)

Population (2005 census)
  - Total: 1,107
  - Density: 13.96/km^{2} (36.17/sq mi)
- Time zone: UTC-5 (PET)
- UBIGEO: 140302

Chochope District is one of twelve districts of the province Lambayeque in Peru.
