= Salas District, Lambayeque =

Coordinates: 6.2743°S 79.6099°W

Salas District
- District
- Interactive map of Salas District
- Country: Peru
- Region: Lambayeque
- Province: Lambayeque
- Capital: Salas

Government
  - Mayor: Emilio Reyes Peña

Area
  - Total: 991.8 km^{2} (382.9 sq mi)
- Elevation: 190 m (620 ft)

Population (2005 census)
  - Total: 14,035
  - Density: 14.15/km^{2} (36.65/sq mi)
- Time zone: UTC-5 (PET)
- UBIGEO: 140310

Salas District is one of twelve districts of the province Lambayeque in Peru.
