= Jayanca District =

Coordinates: 6.3955°S 79.8301°W

Jayanca
- District
- Coat of arms
- Interactive map of Jayanca
- Country: Peru
- Region: Lambayeque
- Province: Lambayeque
- Capital: Jayanca

Government
  - Mayor: Juan Augusto Purisaca Vigil

Area
  - Total: 680.96 km^{2} (262.92 sq mi)
- Elevation: 61 m (200 ft)

Population (2005 census)
  - Total: 14,206
  - Density: 20.862/km^{2} (54.032/sq mi)
- Time zone: UTC-5 (PET)
- UBIGEO: 140304
- Website: munijayanca.gob.pe

Jayanca District is one of twelve districts of the Lambayeque Province in the Lambayeque region, Peru.

== Toponymy ==
In a well-documented 17th-century source, the name appears as Iaianca in the local mochica language of the time. This toponym was recorded by the catholic priest and parish vicar of San Martín de Reque, Fernando de la Carrera Daza, in his book Arte de la lengua yunga (1644). The work stands as a notable descriptive grammar of the mochica language during the colonial era, authored by Carrera, who was born in Trujillo and had learned the region’s native tongue in his childhood in the nearby city of Lambayeque.

== History ==
The district's origin is unclear, in his Miscelánea Antártica, the 16th-century chronicler Miguel Cabello de Balboa recounts the legend that the valley was first settled by Llapchillully, the favored tailor of Naylamp, the mythical founder of the lambayeque culture (of mochica ethnicity). Cabello’s account was later studied by Enrique Brünning in relation to this tradition. American anthropologist Izumi Shimada has claimed that the district's first inhabitants, the Sarayoq, belonged to the Andean civilization known as Chavín de Huántar, who formed their first rural settlements in the fertile valleys of Jayanca, Salas, and Motupe.

During the Incan period Jayanca was subdued by the Inca Huayna Capac who, commanding 40,000 men, left Cusco and headed for Quito. During his voyage, he conquered several valleys of the north coast, among them Jayanca.

In the late 14th and early 15th centuries, the valley of the Jayanca lordship, ethnically mochica, experienced significant depopulation as a result of the forced resettlement of local populations under the Inca system of mitmas. This policy aimed to politically weaken the local lordship, prevent uprisings, and promote the quechuanization of the mochica-speaking population. One such case was that of the jayanca potter mitmas relocated to the lordship of Guambos or Guampu, in present-day Huambos in Cajamarca, and to the arid Pabur region in Piura. This process ceased after the fall of the inca empire. During the colonial period, the local indigenous elite made attempts to bring them back to Jayanca, but without success. Such events were recorded by chroniclers like Sarmiento de Gamboa and later studied by the peruvian historian Waldemar Espinoza Soriano in El valle de Jayanca y el reino de los Mochica, siglos XV y XVI (1975).

== Climate ==
Climate data for Jayanca, elevation 78 m (256 ft), (1991–2020)
Month	Jan	Feb	Mar	Apr	May	Jun	Jul	Aug	Sep	Oct	Nov	Dec	Year
Mean daily maximum °C (°F)	32.4 (90.3)	33.0 (91.4)	33.1 (91.6)	31.8 (89.2)	29.8 (85.6)	27.6 (81.7)	26.8 (80.2)	27.1 (80.8)	28.5 (83.3)	29.2 (84.6)	29.7 (85.5)	31.1 (88.0)	30.0 (86.0)
Mean daily minimum °C (°F)	20.1 (68.2)	21.5 (70.7)	21.3 (70.3)	19.7 (67.5)	17.9 (64.2)	16.1 (61.0)	15.0 (59.0)	14.7 (58.5)	15.1 (59.2)	15.7 (60.3)	16.3 (61.3)	18.2 (64.8)	17.6 (63.7)
Average precipitation mm (inches)	15.6 (0.61)	47.7 (1.88)	74.2 (2.92)	13.3 (0.52)	2.3 (0.09)	0.2 (0.01)	0.2 (0.01)	0.0 (0.0)	0.3 (0.01)	1.2 (0.05)	5.7 (0.22)	3.9 (0.15)	164.6 (6.47)
Source: National Meteorology and Hydrology Service of Peru
