= Mochumi District =

Coordinates: 6°32′39″S 79°51′51″W

Mochumí
- District
- Interactive map of Mochumí
- Country: Peru
- Region: Lambayeque
- Province: Lambayeque
- Capital: Mochumí

Government
  - Mayor: Alexander Rodriges Alvarado

Area
  - Total: 103.7 km^{2} (40.0 sq mi)
- Elevation: 36 m (118 ft)

Population (2005 census)
  - Total: 19,050
  - Density: 183.7/km^{2} (475.8/sq mi)
- Time zone: UTC-5 (PET)
- UBIGEO: 140305

Mochumí District is one of twelve districts of the province Lambayeque in Peru.
