= Pacora District =

Coordinates: 6.4206°S 79.9422°W

Pacora
- District
- Interactive map of Pacora
- Country: Peru
- Region: Lambayeque
- Province: Lambayeque
- Capital: Pacora

Government
  - Mayor: Felix Gil Mayanga

Area
  - Total: 87.79 km^{2} (33.90 sq mi)
- Elevation: 53 m (174 ft)

Population (2005 census)
  - Total: 7,095
  - Density: 80.82/km^{2} (209.3/sq mi)
- Time zone: UTC-5 (PET)
- UBIGEO: 140309

Pacora District is one of twelve districts of the province Lambayeque in Peru.
