= Bonnie Burnham =

American art historian

Bonnie Burnham is an American art historian who is a former head of World Monuments Fund (WMF). She joined the organization as executive director in 1985, and was named president in 1996.

== Early life and education ==
Born in Florida, Burnham received degrees from the University of Florida and the Sorbonne.

== Career ==
Burnham worked in Paris at the International Council of Museums, for which she compiled and edited The Protection of Cultural Property, Handbook of National Legislation, published in 1974.

In 1975, Burnham became executive director of the International Foundation for Art Research (IFAR) in New York. That same year, her book, The Art Crisis, was published. While at IFAR, Burnham developed its Art Theft Archive program and published Art Theft; Its Scope, Its Impact and Its Control (1978).

In 1985, Burnham became executive director of the International Fund for Monuments, which later became the World Monuments Fund. Under Burnham's leadership, the WMF established national affiliate organizations in Western Europe in the 1980s and early 1990s. It also began programs for Eastern European nations after the fall of the communist regimes in that area. WMF also started the Jewish Heritage Program.

Under Burnham, WMF began programs in Cambodia following the downfall of the Khmer Rouge regime, in the former Yugoslavia after the Balkans war, and Iraq after the fall of the Saddam Hussein regime. In 1996, Burnham established the World Monuments Watch, which calls attention to heritage emergencies and opportunities.

Burnham retired in 2015.

== Recognition ==
Burnham's honors include: Chevalier of the Order of Arts and Letters by the French government (1989); Distinguished Alumna of the College of Fine Arts of the University of Florida (1995); the first recipient of the University of Florida's Beinecke-Reeves Distinguished Achievement Award in Historic Preservation (2004); and an honorary doctorate of humane letters from Florida Southern College (2009).

Burnham has served on the boards of the National Institute of Conservation and the Hearst Castle Preservation Foundation and as a member of the United States Commission for UNESCO. She is currently on the board of the New York Studio School; Fellow of the U. S. Committee, International Council on Monuments and Sites; and a member of the Board of Advocates, College of Design, Construction and Planning, University of Florida. She also serves on the International Council of the Preservation Society of Newport, Rhode Island, and the National Advisory Committee of The Olana Partnership.
