= Lambayeque District =

Coordinates: 6.7010°S 79.9048°W

Lambayeque Distrito de Lambayeque
- District
- Lambayeque District
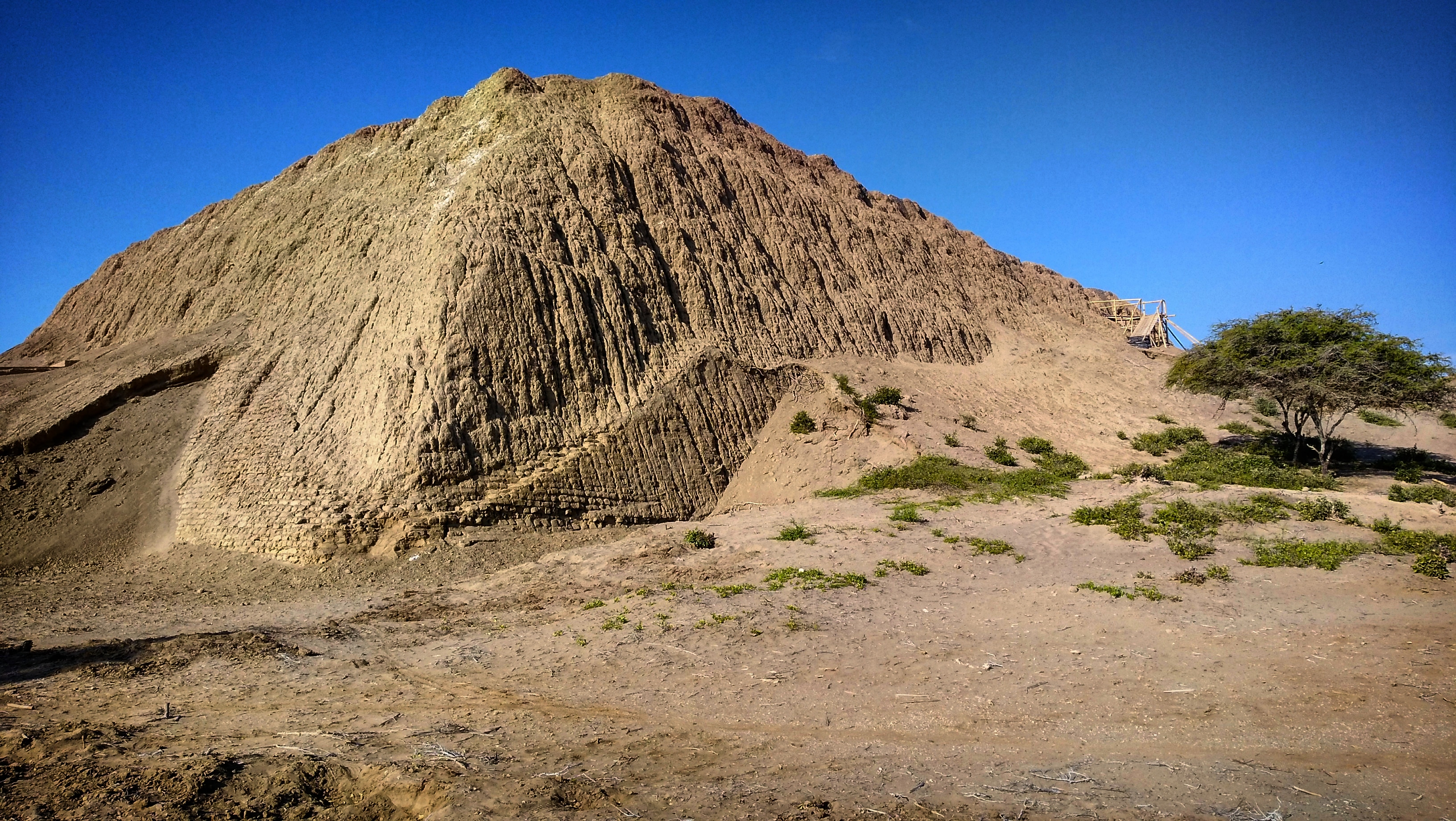
- Interactive map of Lambayeque
- Country: Peru
- Region: Lambayeque
- Province: Lambayeque
- Founded: February 12, 1821
- Founder: José de San Martín
- Capital: Lambayeque

Government
  - Mayor: Percy Alberto Ramos Puelles

Area
  - Total: 332.73 km^{2} (128.47 sq mi)
- Elevation: 17 m (56 ft)

Population (2005 census)
  - Total: 61,025
  - Density: 183.41/km^{2} (475.02/sq mi)
- Time zone: UTC-5 (PET)
- UBIGEO: 140301

Lambayeque District is one of twelve districts of the province Lambayeque in Peru.
