= Motupe District =

Coordinates: 6.1508°S 79.7208°W

Motupe
- District
- Interactive map of Motupe
- Country: Peru
- Region: Lambayeque
- Province: Lambayeque
- Capital: Motupe

Government
  - Mayor: Javier Contreras Muñoz

Area
  - Total: 557.37 km^{2} (215.20 sq mi)
- Elevation: 130 m (430 ft)

Population (2005 census)
  - Total: 24,532
  - Density: 44.014/km^{2} (114.00/sq mi)
- Time zone: UTC-5 (PET)
- UBIGEO: 140307

Motupe District is one of twelve districts of the province Lambayeque in Peru.
