= Lambayeque province =

Coordinates: 6.704662°S 79.907082°W

Lambayeque Provincia de Lambayeque
- Province
- Lambayeque Province
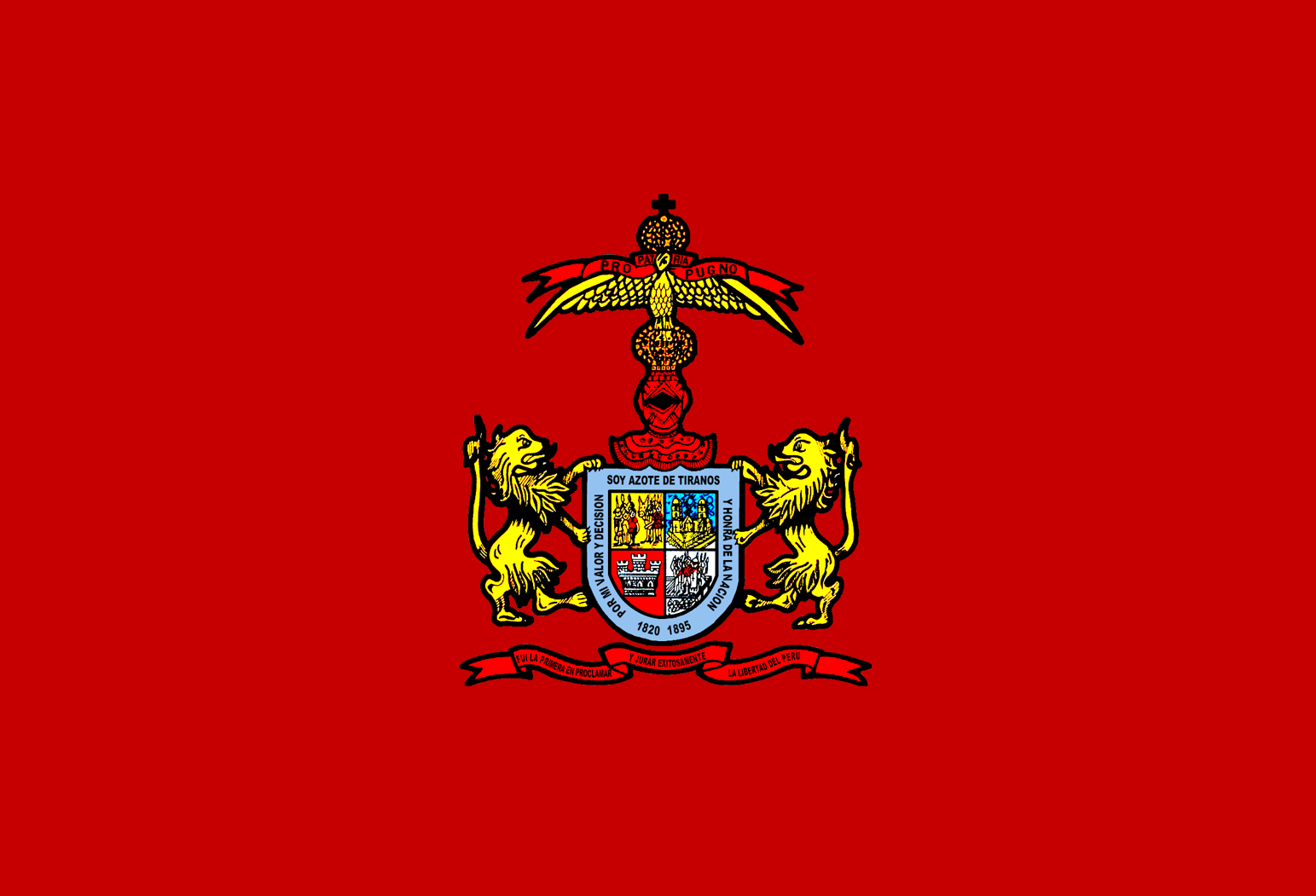
- Flag Coat of arms

- Location of Lambayeque in the Lambayeque Region
- Interactive map of Lambayeque
- Country: Peru
- Region: Lambayeque
- Founded: February 12, 1821
- Founder: José de San Martín
- Capital: Lambayeque

Government
  - Mayor: Percy Alberto Ramos Puelles (2023-2026) (Avanza País)

Area
  - Total: 9,346.63 km^{2} (3,608.75 sq mi)
- Elevation: 17 m (56 ft)

Population (2005 census)
  - Total: 258,747
  - Density: 27.6835/km^{2} (71.6998/sq mi)
- UBIGEO: 1403
- Website: www.munilambayeque.gob.pe

Lambayeque province is the oldest and largest of three provinces in Peru's Lambayeque Region. The province was established on February 12, 1821, by José de San Martín, originating from the former administrative entity known as the Partido of Saña or Lambayeque under the Intendancy of Trujillo. As such, it originally spanned the entire modern-day Department of Lambayeque, along with the provinces of Chepén and Pacasmayo, until the province of Chiclayo was definitively created in March 1839 (with a brief period in April 1835).

== Boundaries ==
- North, Northwest and Northeast: Piura Region
- East: A tiny border with the Cajamarca region
- Southeast provinces of Ferreñafe and Chiclayo
- Southwest Pacific Ocean

== Political division ==
The province has an area of 9,346.63 square kilometers (3,608.75 sq mi) and is divided into twelve districts.

- Lambayeque
- Chochope
- Illimo
- Jayanca
- Mochumi
- Morrope
- Motupe
- Olmos
- Pacora
- Salas
- San José
- Túcume

== Population ==
The province has an approximate population of 230,385 inhabitants.

== Capital ==
The provincial capital is the city of Lambayeque.

== See also ==
- Lambayeque Region
- Peru
