= Pirqasqa =

Mountain in Peru

- Location within Peru

Highest point
- Elevation: 5,000 m (16,000 ft)
- Coordinates: 14°50′12″S 72°25′21″W

Geography
- Location: Peru, Arequipa Region, La Unión Province
- Parent range: Andes, Wansu

Pirqasqa (Quechua pirqa wall, -sqa a suffix, "stonewalled", hispanicized spelling Perjasja) is a mountain in the Wansu mountain range in the Andes of Peru, about 5,000 metres (16,404 ft) high. It is situated in the Arequipa Region, La Unión Province, in the northern part of the Puyca District. It lies south of Qullpa K'uchu, west of Kunturillu and southeast of Minasniyuq. The little lake east of Pirqasqa is named Pirqasqaqucha (Perjasjacocha).

The Kunturillu River (Condorillo) originates northwest of the mountain. It flows to the southeast as a right tributary of the Uqururu (Aymara and Quechua for Mimulus glabratus, hispanicized Ojoruro). The river is also known as Sumana or Cotahuasi. It flows to the Cotahuasi Canyon in the southwest.
