= Chuañuma (La Unión) =

Mountain in Peru

- Location within Peru

Highest point
- Elevation: 5,000 m (16,000 ft)
- Coordinates: 14°59′12″S 72°26′49″W

Naming
- Language of name: Aymara

Geography
- Location: Peru, Arequipa Region, La Unión Province
- Parent range: Andes, Huanzo

Chuañuma (possibly from Aymara ch'uwaña oozing of water and other liquids / melting of metals and other things, uma water, "oozing water") is a mountain in the Huanzo mountain range in the Andes of Peru, about 5,000 metres (16,404 ft) high. It is located in the Arequipa Region, La Unión Province, Puyca District. It is situated south of the river Ojoruro (possibly from Aymara and Quechua for Mimulus glabratus), also known as Sumana or Cotahuasi, which flows to the Cotahuasi Canyon in the southwest. Chuañuma lies southwest of Pillune, west of Quelcata and northeast of Condori.
