= Llimphiq =

Mountain in Peru

- Location within Peru

Highest point
- Elevation: 5,000 m (16,000 ft)
- Coordinates: 14°56′32″S 72°30′48″W

Geography
- Location: Peru, Arequipa Region, La Unión Province
- Parent range: Andes, Wansu

Llimphiq (Quechua llimphi, llimp'i a painting / the color for painting, -q a suffix "painted" or "painter", Hispanicized spelling Llempic) is a mountain in the Wansu mountain range in the Andes of Peru, about 5,000 metres (16,404 ft) high. It is located in the Arequipa Region, La Unión Province, Puyca District. It lies southwest of the lakes named Ikmaqucha and Huch'uyqucha (Quechua for "small lake", Uchuycocha).

== See also ==
- Janq'u Q'awa
- Pilluni
- Puka Ranra
