= Kunturi =

Kunturi (Aymara for condor, Hispanicized spelling Condori) may refer to:

- Condori (Condesuyos), a mountain in the Condesuyos Province and in the La Unión Province in the Arequipa Region, Peru
- Kunturi (Cusco), a mountain in the Cusco Region, Peru
- Kunturi (Ikmaqucha), a mountain near Ikmaqucha in the Puyca District, La Unión Province, Arequipa Region, Peru
- Condori (La Unión), a mountain in the Puyca District, La Unión Province, Arequipa Region, Peru
- Kunturi (Tarucani), a mountain in the Tarucani District, Arequipa Province, Arequipa Region, Peru

== See also ==
- Kunturiri (disambiguation)
- Kundur (disambiguation)
- Condor (disambiguation)
