= Chunta (Arequipa) =

Mountain in the Andes of Peru

- Location within Peru

Highest point
- Elevation: 5,100 m (16,700 ft)
- Coordinates: 14°47′01″S 72°34′18″W

Geography
- Location: Peru, Arequipa Region, La Unión Province
- Parent range: Andes, Wansu

Chunta (Aymara for prolonged, lengthened, also spelled Chonta) is a mountain in the Wansu mountain range in the Andes of Peru, about 5,100 metres (16,732 ft) high. It is located in the Arequipa Region, La Unión Province, Puyca District. It lies south of the river Qumpi Pallqa (Compepalca), northwest of Tintaya and east of Puka Suntu.

Chunta is also the name of a slightly lower mountain southeast of Tintaya.
