= Puka Ranra (Arequipa) =

Mountain in Peru

- Location within Peru

Highest point
- Elevation: 5,000 m (16,000 ft)
- Coordinates: 14°51′4″S 72°30′57″W

Geography
- Location: Peru, Arequipa Region, La Unión Province
- Parent range: Andes, Wansu

Puka Ranra (Quechua puka red, ranra stony; stony ground, "red, stony ground", Hispanicized spelling Pucaranra) is a mountain in the Wansu mountain range in the Andes of Peru, about 5,000 metres (16,404 ft) high. It is located in the Arequipa Region, La Unión Province, Puyca District. It is southwest of Qullpa K'uchu, Minasniyuq, Minata and Kunturillu. Puka Ranra lies in a remote, mountainous area north of Ikmaqucha.
