= Kunturi (Ikmaqucha) =

Mountain in Peru

- Location within Peru

Highest point
- Elevation: 5,000 m (16,000 ft)
- Coordinates: 14°53′09″S 72°28′22″W

Geography
- Location: Peru, Arequipa Region, La Unión Province
- Parent range: Andes, Wansu

Kunturi (Aymara for condor, Hispanicized spelling Condori) is a mountain in the Wansu mountain range in the Andes of Peru, about 5,000 metres (16,404 ft) high. It is located in the Arequipa Region, La Unión Province, Puyca District. Kunturi lies east of a lake named Ikmaqucha. Taypi Q'awa is the mountain northeast of it. The intermittent streams south of Kunturi flow to the Uqururu (Aymara and Quechua for Mimulus glabratus, Hispanicized Ojoruro), also known as Sumana or Cotahuasi, which flows to the Cotahuasi Canyon in the southwest.
