= Pichaqani (Arequipa) =

- Location within Peru

Highest point
- Elevation: 5,200 m (17,100 ft)
- Coordinates: 14°46′51″S 72°29′23″W

Geography
- Location: Peru, Arequipa Region, La Unión Province
- Parent range: Andes, Wansu

Pichaqani (Aymara pichaqa, phichaqa, piqacha a big needle, -ni a suffix to indicate ownership, "the one with a big needle", Hispanicized spelling Pichacane) is a mountain in the Wansu mountain range in the Andes of Peru, about 5,200 metres (17,060 ft) high. It is situated in the Arequipa Region, La Unión Province, Puyca District. Pichaqani lies southwest of Qullpa and northwest of Qullpa K'uchu and Minasniyuq.
