= Thujsa =

Mountain in Peru

- Location within Peru

Highest point
- Elevation: 5,000 m (16,000 ft)
- Coordinates: 14°55′33″S 72°29′19″W

Geography
- Location: Peru, Arequipa Region, La Unión Province
- Parent range: Andes, Wansu

Thujsa (Aymara for smelling, Hispanicized spelling Tucsa) is a mountain in the Wansu mountain range in the Andes of Peru, about 5,000 metres (16,404 ft) high. It is situated in the Arequipa Region, La Unión Province, Puyca District, southeast of the lake named Ikmaqucha and northeast of Llimphiq.
