= Aqu Suntu (Chullumpi) =

- Location within Peru

Highest point
- Elevation: 5,081 m (16,670 ft)
- Coordinates: 14°42′39″S 72°39′07″W

Geography
- Location: Peru, Arequipa Region, La Unión Province
- Parent range: Andes, Wansu

Aqu Suntu (Quechua aqu sand, suntu heap, pile, "sand heap", Hispanicized spelling Ajosunto) is a 5,081-metre-high (16,670 ft) mountain in the Wansu mountain range in the Andes of Peru. It is located in the Arequipa Region, La Unión Province, in the northern part of the Huaynacotas District. Aqu Suntu lies south of Chullumpi, southwest of Allqa Walusa and west of Q'illu Urqu.
