= Cotahuasi (disambiguation) =

Cotahuasi may refer to:

- Cotahuasi, town in Peru
- Cotahuasi Canyon, Peru
- Cotahuasi District, Peru
