= Anka Phawa (Puyca) =

Mountain in Peru

- Location within Peru

Highest point
- Elevation: 5,000 m (16,000 ft)
- Coordinates: 14°43′11″S 72°34′03″W

Geography
- Location: Peru, Arequipa Region, La Unión Province
- Parent range: Andes, Wansu

Anka Phawa (Quechua anka eagle or black-chested buzzard-eagle, phaway, phawa flight, "eagle flight", also spelled Ancapahua) is a mountain in the Wansu mountain range in the Andes of Peru, about 5,000-metre (16,404 ft) high. It is situated in the Arequipa Region, La Unión Province, Puyca District. Anka Phawa lies north of Yuraq Rumi and southeast of Q'illu Urqu.
