= Anca Pahuas =

Mountain in Peru

- Location within Peru

Highest point
- Elevation: 5,000 m (16,000 ft)
- Coordinates: 15°00′24″S 72°27′33″W

Geography
- Location: Peru, Arequipa Region, Condesuyos Province, La Unión Province
- Parent range: Andes, Huanzo

Anca Pahuas (possibly from Quechua anka eagle or black-chested buzzard-eagle, phaway, phawa flight, "eagle flight") is a mountain in the Huanzo mountain range in the Andes of Peru, about 5,000 metres (16,000 ft) high. It is situated in the Arequipa Region, Condesuyos Province, Cayarani District, and in the La Unión Province, Puyca District. Anca Pahuas lies between Quelcata in the northeast and Condori in the southwest.
