= Challwa Q'asa =

Mountain in Peru

- Location within Peru

Highest point
- Elevation: 5,000 m (16,000 ft)
- Coordinates: 14°50′19″S 72°39′01″W

Geography
- Location: Peru, Arequipa Region, La Unión Province
- Parent range: Andes, Wansu

Challwa Q'asa (Quechua challwa fish, q'asa mountain pass, "fish pass", also spelled Chayhuajasa) is a mountain in the Wansu mountain range in the Andes of Peru, about 5,000 metres (16,404 ft) high. It is located in the Arequipa Region, La Unión Province, Puyca District. It lies northwest of Chhijmuni and Wayta Urqu.
