= Kuntur K'uchu =

Mountain in Peru

- Location within Peru

Highest point
- Elevation: 5,200 m (17,100 ft)
- Coordinates: 14°44′25″S 72°29′12″W

Geography
- Location: Peru, Arequipa Region, Cusco Region
- Parent range: Andes, Wansu

Kuntur K'uchu (Quechua kuntur condor, k'uchu corner, "condor corner", Hispanicized spelling Condorcucho) is a mountain in the Wansu mountain range in the Andes of Peru, about 5,200 metres (17,060 ft) high. It is situated in the Arequipa Region, La Unión Province, Puyca District, and in the Cusco Region, Chumbivilcas Province, Santo Tomás District. It lies northwest of Qullpa and north of Pichaqani.
