= Surimana =

Mountain in Minasniyuq, Peru

- Location within Peru

Highest point
- Elevation: 5,200 m (17,100 ft)
- Coordinates: 14°46′18″S 72°26′58″W

Geography
- Location: Peru, Cusco Region
- Parent range: Andes, Wansu

Surimana (Aymara for a sort of potatoes (white and long), also spelled Sorimana) is a mountain in the Wansu mountain range in the Andes of Peru, about 5,200 metres (17,060 ft) high. It is situated in the Cusco Region, Chumbivilcas Province, Santo Tomás District. Surimana lies northwest of Qullpa K'uchu and Minasniyuq.
