= Paxsi =

Mountain in Peru

- Location within Peru

Highest point
- Elevation: 4,941.1 m (16,211 ft)
- Coordinates: 15°0′47″S 72°55′54″W

Geography
- Location: La Unión Province, Arequipa Region, Peru
- Parent range: Andes

Paxsi (Aymara for "moon", Hispanicized spelling Pacsi) is a mountain in the Andes of Peru, about 4,941.1 metres (16,211 ft) high. It is situated in Pampamarca District of La Unión Province in the Arequipa Region. Paxsi lies south of the Chawpimayu (Quechua for "central river", Hispanicized Chaupimayo) or Wayllapaña (Huayllapaña), a right affluent of the Cotahuasi River.
