= Ancasi (Arequipa) =

Mountain in Peru

- Location within Peru

Highest point
- Elevation: 5,000 m (16,000 ft)
- Coordinates: 14°52′51″S 72°21′38″W

Geography
- Location: Peru, Arequipa Region
- Parent range: Andes, Huanzo

Ancasi (possibly from Quechua for cobalt salt used for dyeing) is a mountain in the Huanzo mountain range in the Andes of Peru, about 5,000 metres (16,404 ft) high. It is situated in the Arequipa Region, La Unión Province, Puyca District. It lies southwest of Jatun Huaychahui. Chuañuma is east of Ancasi.
