= Aqu Suntu =

Mountain in Peru

- Location within Peru

Highest point
- Elevation: 5,243 m (17,201 ft)
- Coordinates: 14°49′04″S 72°46′23″W

Geography
- Location: Peru, Arequipa Region, La Unión Province
- Parent range: Andes, Wansu

Aqu Suntu (Quechua aqu sand, suntu heap, pile, "sand heap", Hispanicized spelling Ajo Sunto) is a 5,243-metre-high (17,201 ft) mountain in the Wansu mountain range in the Andes of Peru. It is located in the Arequipa Region, La Unión Province, in the central part of the Huaynacotas District. Aqu Suntu lies southwest of Qarwa Urqu.
