= Kimsa Qaqa =

Mountain in Peru

- Location within Peru

Highest point
- Elevation: 5,000 m (16,000 ft)
- Coordinates: 14°55′13″S 72°53′46″W

Geography
- Location: Peru, Arequipa Region
- Parent range: Andes, Wansu

Kimsa Qaqa (Quechua kimsa three, qaqa rock, "three rocks", Hispanicized spelling Quimsajaja) is a group of three mountains in the Wansu mountain range in the Andes of Peru, about 5,000 metres (16,404 ft) high. It is located in the Arequipa Region, La Unión Province, Pampamarca District. The three peaks of Kimsa Qaqa lie in a row from southwest to northeast, southeast of Qarwa K'uchu.
