= Yuraq Punta =

Mountain in Peru

- Location within Peru

Highest point
- Elevation: 5,100 m (16,700 ft)
- Coordinates: 14°48′22″S 72°31′37″W

Geography
- Location: Peru, Arequipa Region, La Unión Province
- Parent range: Andes, Wansu

Yuraq Punta (Quechua yuraq white, punta peak; ridge, "white peak (or ridge)", also spelled Yurajpunta) is a mountain in the Wansu mountain range in the Andes of Peru, about 5,100 metres (16,732 ft) high. It is located in the Arequipa Region, La Unión Province, Puyca District. Yuraq Punta lies west of Minata, northeast of Chawpi Chawpi and Chunta, and east of Tintaya, north of a lake named Ikmaqucha (Quechua for "widow lake").
