= Yana Yana (Peru) =

Mountain in Peru

- Location within Peru

Highest point
- Elevation: 5,321 m (17,457 ft)
- Coordinates: 14°56′53″S 72°22′04″W

Geography
- Location: Peru, Arequipa Region, Condesuyos Province, La Unión Province
- Parent range: Andes, Wansu

Yana Yana (Aymara yana black, night, Quechua yana black, the reduplication indicates that there is a group or a complex of something, may be "a complex of black color") is a 5,321-metre-high (17,457 ft) mountain in the Wansu mountain range in the Andes of Peru. It is situated in the Arequipa Region, Condesuyos Province, Cayarani District, and in the La Unión Province, Puyca District. Yana Yana lies northeast of Janq'u Q'awa and southeast of Kunturi.
