= Rumi Urqu =

Mountain in Arequipa Region, Peru

- Location within Peru

Highest point
- Elevation: 5,000 m (16,000 ft)
- Coordinates: 14°46′13″S 72°35′25″W

Geography
- Location: Peru, Arequipa Region, La Unión Province
- Parent range: Andes, Wansu

Rumi Urqu (Quechua rumi stone, urqu mountain, "stone mountain", Hispanicized spelling Rumi Orjo) is a mountain in the Wansu mountain range in the Andes of Peru, about 5,000 metres (16,404 ft) high. It is situated in the Arequipa Region, La Unión Province, Puyca District. Rumi Urqu lies at the bank of the Qumpi P'allqa River (Compepalca). Yuraq Rumi is to the northeast, beyond the river.
