= Pisti Q'asa =

Mountain in Peru

- Location within Peru

Highest point
- Elevation: 5,000 m (16,000 ft)
- Coordinates: 14°43′21″S 72°44′30″W

Geography
- Location: Peru, Arequipa Region, La Unión Province
- Parent range: Andes, Wansu

Pisti Q'asa (Aymara and Quechua pisti influenca, a common cold or plague, Quechua q'asa mountain pass, Hispanicized spelling Pistijasa) is a 5,169-metre-high (16,959 ft) mountain in the Wansu mountain range in the Andes of Peru. It is located in the Arequipa Region, La Unión Province, Huaynacotas District. Pisti Q'asa lies southwest of Puka Urqu and northwest of P'umpu Q'asa.
