= Khirki Urqu =

Mountain in Peru

- Location within Peru

Highest point
- Elevation: 5,000 m (16,000 ft)
- Coordinates: 14°43′44″S 72°36′40″W

Geography
- Location: Peru, Arequipa Region, La Unión Province
- Parent range: Andes, Wansu

Khirki Urqu (Quechua khirki armadillo, urqu mountain, "armadillo mountain", Hispanicized spelling Querque Orjo) is a mountain in the Wansu mountain range in the Andes of Peru, about 5,000 m (16,404 ft) high. It is located in the Arequipa Region, La Unión Province, Huaynacotas District. Khirki Urqu lies southwest of Q'illu Urqu.
