= Chawpi Chawpi =

Mountain in Peru

- Location within Peru

Highest point
- Elevation: 5,200 m (17,100 ft)
- Coordinates: 14°48′40″S 72°34′21″W

Geography
- Location: Peru, Arequipa Region, La Unión Province
- Parent range: Andes, Wansu

Chawpi Chawpi (Quechua chawpi central, middle, the reduplication indicates that there is a group or a complex of something, Hispanicized spelling Chaupi Chaupi) is a mountain in the Wansu mountain range in the Andes of Peru, about 5,200 metres (17,060 ft) high. It is situated in the Arequipa Region, La Unión Province, Puyca District. Chawpi Chawpi lies northwest of Ikmaqucha and southwest of the mountains Yuraq Punta and Tintaya.
