= Sullu Marka =

Mountain in Peru

- Location within Peru

Highest point
- Elevation: 5,000 m (16,000 ft)
- Coordinates: 14°55′27″S 72°45′48″W

Geography
- Location: Peru, Arequipa Region
- Parent range: Andes, Wansu

Sullu Marka (Aymara sullu miscarried (fetus), Quechua sullu miscarriage; unborn fetus; key for doors or boxes, Hispanicized spelling Sullumarca) is a mountain in the Wansu mountain range in the Andes of Peru, about 5,000 metres (16,404 ft) high. It is situated in the Arequipa Region, La Unión Province, Huaynacotas District. It lies southwest of Hatun Sisiwa. Sullu Marka is also the name of the mountain just west of Hatun Sisiwa.
