= Huiñao =

Archaeological site in Peru

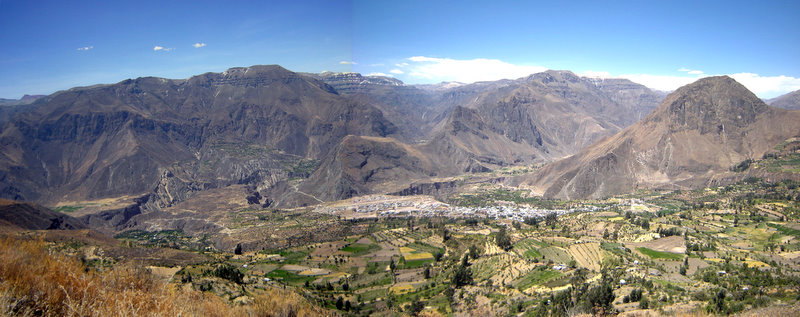
- Cotahuasi canyon with the mountain Huiñao (on the right) as seen from the southwest

Highest point
- Elevation: 3,645 m (11,959 ft)
- Coordinates: 15°12′20.7″S 72°52′22.7″W

Geography
- Location within Peru
- Location: Peru, Arequipa Region
- Parent range: Andes

Huiñao is a mountain in the Andes of Peru, about 3,645 metres (11,959 ft) high. It lies in the Arequipa Region, La Unión Province, Cotahuasi District. What makes the mountain so special among the much higher mountains surrounding it is that it is situated in the Cotahuasi Canyon and that there are good panoramic views from its top across the Cotahuasi Canyon and the surrounding mountains. There is also an archaeological site on top of the mountain.

By the local people Huiñao is venerated as an apu.
