= Chunta Pata =

Mountain in Peru

- Location within Peru

Highest point
- Elevation: 5,000 m (16,000 ft)
- Coordinates: 14°45′16″S 72°36′39″W

Geography
- Location: Peru, Arequipa Region, La Unión Province
- Parent range: Andes, Wansu

Chunta Pata (Aymara for prolonged, pata step, "prolonged step", also spelled Chuntapata) is a mountain in the Wansu mountain range in the Andes of Peru, about 5,000 metres (16,404 ft) high. It is located in the Arequipa Region, La Unión Province, Huaynacotas District. It lies southwest of Q'illu Urqu.
