= Wila Quta (Apurímac-Arequipa) =

Mountain in Peru

- Location within Peru

Highest point
- Elevation: 5,100 m (16,700 ft)
- Coordinates: 14°40′25″S 72°39′29″W

Geography
- Location: Peru, Apurímac Region, Arequipa Region
- Parent range: Andes, Wansu

Wila Quta (Aymara wila blood, blood-red, quta lake, "red lake", also spelled Huilacota) is a mountain in the Wansu mountain range in the Andes of Peru, about 5,100 metres (16,732 ft) high. It is situated in the Apurímac Region, Antabamba Province, Antabamba District, and in the Arequipa Region, La Unión Province, Huaynacotas District. Wila Quta lies west of Taruja Marka and Allqa Walusa and southeast of Wallqa Wallqa.
