= Qullpa (Chumbivilcas-La Unión) =

Mountain in Peru

- Location within Peru

Highest point
- Elevation: 5,100 m (16,700 ft)
- Coordinates: 14°46′6″S 72°28′10″W

Geography
- Location: Peru, Arequipa Region, La Unión Province, Cusco Region, Chumbivilcas Province
- Parent range: Andes, Wansu

Qullpa (Aymara and Quechua for saltpeter, Hispanicized spelling Collpa) is a mountain in the Wansu mountain range in the Andes of Peru, about 5,100 metres (16,732 ft) high. It is situated in the Arequipa Region, La Unión Province, Puyca District, and in the Cusco Region, Chumbivilcas Province, Santo Tomás District. It lies northwest of the mountains Qullpa K'uchu and Minasniyuq.
