= Condori (La Unión) =

Mountain in Peru

- Location within Peru

Highest point
- Elevation: 5,200 m (17,100 ft)
- Coordinates: 14°54′32″S 72°22′45″W

Geography
- Location: Peru, Arequipa Region, La Unión Province
- Parent range: Andes, Huanzo

Condori (possibly from Aymara for condor) is a mountain in the Wansu mountain range in the Andes of Peru, about 5,200 metres (17,060 ft) high. It is situated in the Arequipa Region, La Unión Province, Puyca District, south of the lake named Ranracocha. Condori lies near Pichirhua and south of the river Ojoruro (possibly from Aymara and Quechua for Mimulus glabratus), also known as Sumana or Cotahuasi, which flows to the Cotahuasi Canyon in the southwest.

== See also ==
- Ancojahua
- Pillune
