= Chunta (disambiguation) =

Chunta may refer to:

- Chunta Aragonesista, a political party in Spain
- Chunta (Arequipa), a mountain in the Arequipa Region, Peru
- Chunta (Ayacucho), a mountain in the Ayacucho Region, Peru
- Chunta (Junín-Lima), a mountain on the border of the Junín Region and the Lima Region, Peru
- Chunta (dancers), a traditional character in the Fiesta Grande of Chiapa de Corzo, Chiapas, Mexico
- Chunta (film), a documentary film about the Chunta dancers of Mexico, directed by Genevieve Roudané
