= Taypi Q'awa =

Mountain in Peru

- Location within Peru

Highest point
- Elevation: 5,000 m (16,000 ft)
- Coordinates: 14°53′07″S 72°27′01″W

Geography
- Location: Peru, Arequipa Region, La Unión Province
- Parent range: Andes, Wansu

Taypi Q'awa (Aymara taypi center, middle, q'awa little river, ditch, crevice, fissure, gap in the earth, "middle brook" or "middle ravine", hispanicized spelling Taipicahua) is a mountain in the Wansu mountain range in the Andes of Peru, about 5,000 m (16,404 ft) high. It is located in the Arequipa Region, La Unión Province, Puyca District, east of Ikmaqucha.
