= Yuraq Apachita (La Unión) =

Mountain in Peru

- Location within Peru

Highest point
- Elevation: 5,000 m (16,000 ft)
- Coordinates: 14°56′00″S 72°48′49″W

Geography
- Location: Peru, Arequipa Region
- Parent range: Andes, Wansu

Yuraq Apachita (Quechua yuraq white, Aymara apachita the place of transit of an important pass in the principal routes of the Andes; name for a stone cairn in the Andes, a little pile of rocks built along the trail in the high mountains, Hispanicized spelling Yuraj Apacheta) is a mountain in the Wansu mountain range in the Andes of Peru, about 5,000 metres (16,404 ft) high. It is situated in the Arequipa Region, La Unión Province, Huaynacotas District. Yuraq Apachita lies southeast of Puka Willka.
