= Pampamarca District, La Unión =

Coordinates: 15.1831°S 72.9058°W

Pampamarca Pampa Marka
- District
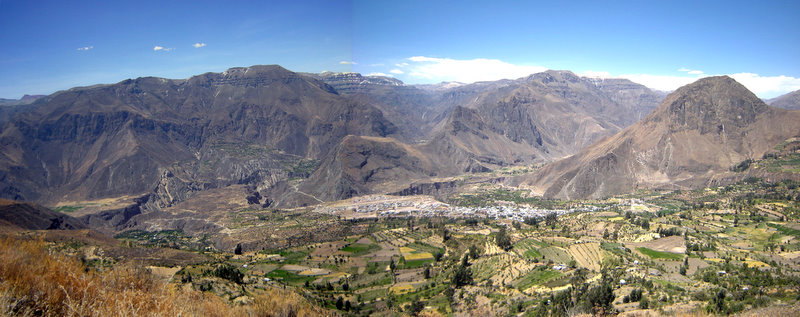
- Pampamarka District (in the background) as seen from Cotahuasi
- Interactive map of Pampamarca
- Country: Peru
- Region: Arequipa
- Province: La Unión
- Capital: Mungui

Government
  - Mayor: Lelis Enrique Ludeña Blas

Area
  - Total: 782.17 km^{2} (302.00 sq mi)
- Elevation: 2,600 m (8,500 ft)

Population (2005 census)
  - Total: 1,831
  - Density: 2.341/km^{2} (6.063/sq mi)
- Time zone: UTC-5 (PET)
- UBIGEO: 040805

Pampamarca District is one of eleven districts of the La Unión Province in Peru.

== Geography ==
One of the highest peaks of the district is Lunq'u at 5,224 m (17,139 ft). Other mountains are listed below:

- Anta P'unqu
- Aqu
- Ichhu Pata
- Illayuq
- Kimsa Qaqa
- Kunturillu
- Mach'ay P'unqu
- Pari Pari
- Paxsi
- Pilluni
- Qarwa K'uchu
- Qulluta
- Runtuyuq
- Sura Pata
- Tarujani
- T'uru Mach'ay
- Waman Allqa
- Wansu
- Waqutu
- Waylla Marka
- Waylla Sura
- Wilachiri
- Yana Qaqa
- Yana Sura

== Ethnic groups ==
The people in the district are mainly indigenous citizens of Quechua descent. Quechua is the language which the majority of the population (80.11%) learnt to speak in childhood, 19.37% of the residents started speaking using the Spanish language (2007 Peru Census).
