= Cotahuasi District =

Coordinates: 15.2104°S 72.9008°W

Cotahuasi Kutawasi
- District
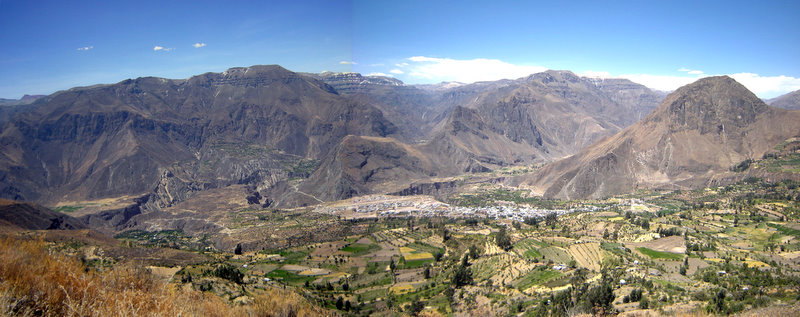
- Cotahuasi canyon with the village of Cotahuasi and the mountain Wiñaw (on the right) as seen from the southwest
- Interactive map of Cotahuasi; Kutawasi
- Country: Peru
- Region: Arequipa
- Province: La Unión
- Capital: Cotahuasi

Government
  - Mayor: Justo Pastor Totocayo Garate

Area
  - Total: 166.5 km^{2} (64.3 sq mi)
- Elevation: 2,683 m (8,802 ft)

Population (2005 census)
  - Total: 2,974
  - Density: 17.86/km^{2} (46.26/sq mi)
- Time zone: UTC-5 (PET)
- UBIGEO: 040801

Cotahuasi District is one of eleven districts of the province La Unión in Peru.

Cotahuasi is located at the highest Andean point of the department of Arequipa, in southern Peruvian. This province is characterized by its steep relief: cut here and as far back as rivers and gullies, with an altitude that ranges between 1,000 and 6,093 meters above sea level, with 19 different ecosystems. Its customs and traditions have been preserved partly on account of its relative isolation, something that has not happened in neighboring villages (REF).

== See also ==
- Cotahuasi Subbasin Landscape Reserve
- Saraqutu
- Sulimana
- Wiñaw
