= Huaynacotas District =

Coordinates: 15.1743°S 72.8496°W

Huaynacotas
- District
- Interactive map of Huaynacotas
- Country: Peru
- Region: Arequipa
- Province: La Unión
- Capital: Taurisma

Government
  - Mayor: Eulogio Rodriguez Gonzales

Area
  - Total: 932.64 km^{2} (360.09 sq mi)
- Elevation: 2,590 m (8,500 ft)

Population (2005 census)
  - Total: 2,778
  - Density: 2.979/km^{2} (7.715/sq mi)
- Time zone: UTC-5 (PET)
- UBIGEO: 040804

Huaynacotas District is one of eleven districts of the province La Unión in Peru.

== Geography ==
The Wansu mountain range traverses the province. Some of the highest peaks of the province are listed below:

- Allqa Q'awa
- Allqa Walusa
- Aqu Suntu
- Aqu Suntu (Chullumpi)
- Chaka Urqu
- Chullumpi
- Chunta Pata
- Hatun Sisiwa
- Inti Utka
- Kimsa Chata
- Kiswarani
- Khirki Urqu
- Khuchi Pata
- Lunq'u
- Llamuqa
- Pilluni
- Pisti Q'asa
- Puka Urqu
- Puka Willka
- Puka Ranra
- P'umpu Q'asa
- Qarwa Urqu
- Runtuyuq
- Sullu Marka
- Suphu Marka
- Uma Q'asa
- Wayrawiri
- Wila Quta
- Yuraq Apachita

== Ethnic groups ==
The people in the district are mainly indigenous citizens of Quechua descent. Quechua is the language which the majority of the population (71.98%) learnt to speak in childhood, 27.11% of the residents started speaking using the Spanish language (2007 Peru Census).

== See also ==
- Wansuqucha
