= Llamuqa =

Archaeological site in Peru

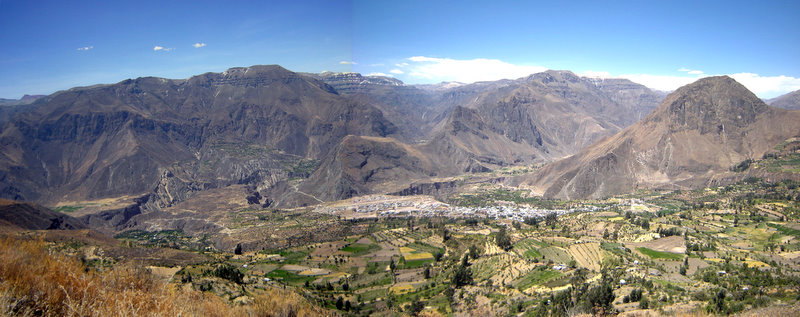
- View over Cotahuasi, right from the middle is Llamuqa

Highest point
- Elevation: 4,794 m (15,728 ft)
- Coordinates: 15°05′20.84″S 72°50′13.31″W

Geography
- Location within Peru
- Location: Peru, Arequipa Region
- Parent range: Andes

Llamuqa (Quechua for a black stone consisting of iron with curative powers, Hispanicized spellings Llamocca, Llamoja) is a mountain with archaeological remains in the Andes of Peru, about 4,794 metres (15,728 ft) high. It is situated in the Arequipa Region, La Unión Province, Huaynacotas District.

By the local people Llamuqa is venerated as an apu.

== See also ==
- Allqa Walusa
- Lunq'u
- Mawk'allaqta
