= Inti Utka =

Mountain in Peru

- Location within Peru

Highest point
- Elevation: 5,100 m (16,700 ft)
- Coordinates: 14°38′39″S 72°44′30″W

Geography
- Location: Peru, Apurímac Region, Antabamba Province, Arequipa Region, La Unión Province
- Parent range: Andes, Wansu

Inti Utka (Aymara willka, inti sun, utka seat, a place to sit down, "sun seat", Hispanicized spelling Intiutca) is a mountain in the Wansu mountain range in the Andes of Peru, about 5,100 metres (16,732 ft) high. It is situated in the Apurímac Region, Antabamba Province, Antabamba District, and in the Arequipa Region, La Unión Province, Huaynacotas District. Inti Utka lies between the mountains Arapa in the northwest and Uchusu Q'asa (Uchusojasa) in the east.

== See also ==
- Quri Waraqa
