= P'umpu Q'asa =

Mountain in Peru

- Location within Peru

Highest point
- Elevation: 5,169 m (16,959 ft)
- Coordinates: 14°43′35″S 72°43′28″W

Geography
- Location: Peru, Arequipa Region, La Unión Province
- Parent range: Andes, Wansu

P'umpu Q'asa (Quechua p'umpu tumor, swelling, to swell; congestion, q'asa mountain pass, Hispanicized spelling Pumpujasa) is a 5,169-metre-high (16,959 ft) mountain in the Wansu mountain range in the Andes of Peru. It is located in the Arequipa Region, La Unión Province, Huaynacotas District. P'umpu Q'asa lies southeast of Kimsa Chata and Puka Urqu.
