= Quechualla District =

Coordinates: 15.3236°S 73.0628°W

Quechualla
- District
- Interactive map of Quechualla
- Country: Peru
- Region: Arequipa
- Province: La Unión
- Founded: May 4, 1835
- Capital: Velinga

Government
  - Mayor: Aldo Enrique Córdova Heredia

Area
  - Total: 138.37 km^{2} (53.42 sq mi)
- Elevation: 1,980 m (6,500 ft)

Population (2005 census)
  - Total: 305
  - Density: 2.20/km^{2} (5.71/sq mi)
- Time zone: UTC-5 (PET)
- UBIGEO: 040807

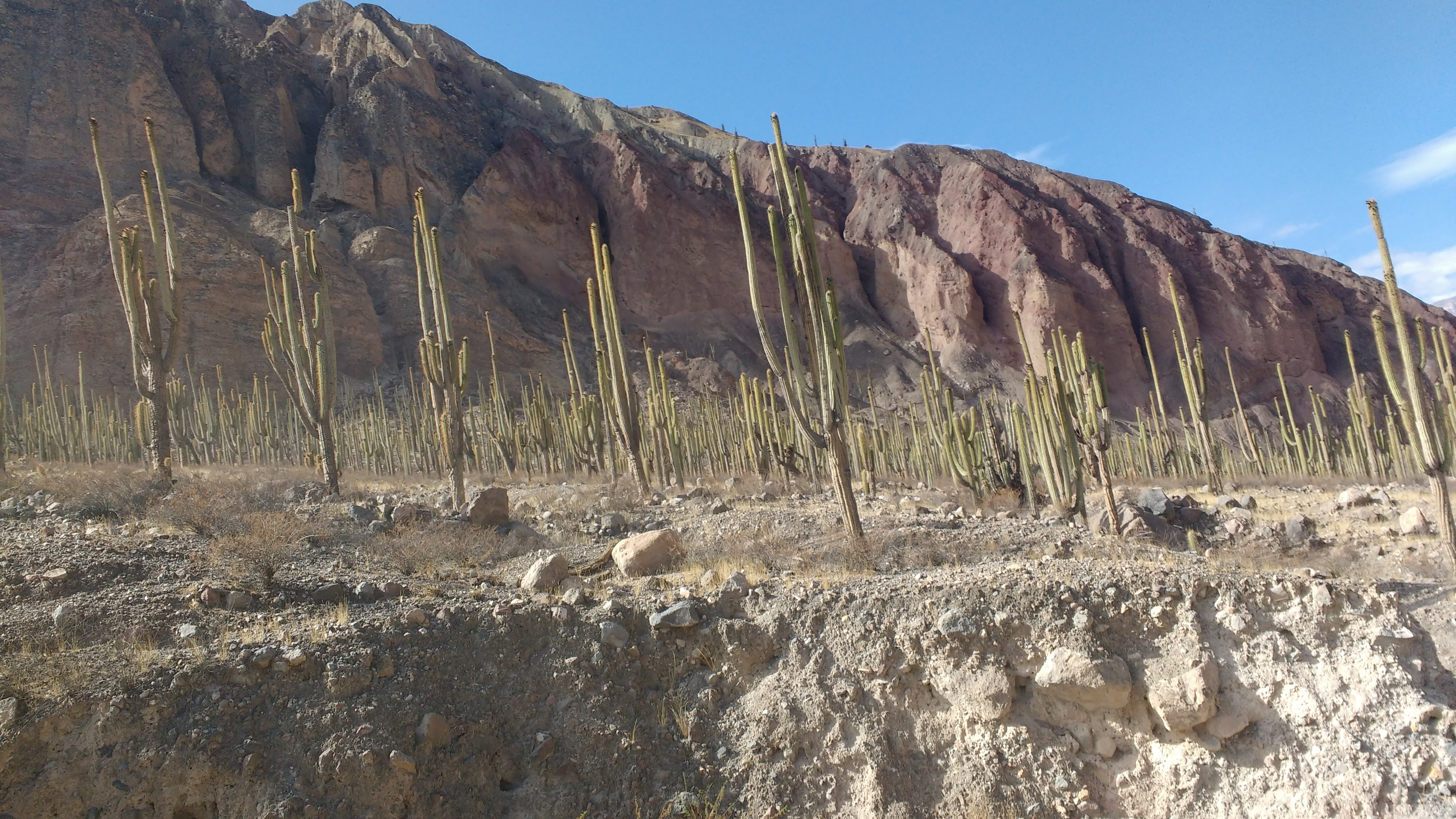

Quechualla District is one of eleven districts of the province La Unión in Peru.
