= Puyca District =

Coordinates: 15.0916°S 72.7872°W

Puyca
- District
- Interactive map of Puyca
- Country: Peru
- Region: Arequipa
- Province: La Unión
- Founded: October 13, 1891
- Capital: Puyca

Government
  - Mayor: Angel Eugenio Pachau Jimenez

Area
  - Total: 1,501.2 km^{2} (579.6 sq mi)
- Elevation: 3,658 m (12,001 ft)

Population (2005 census)
  - Total: 3,337
  - Density: 2.223/km^{2} (5.757/sq mi)
- Time zone: UTC-5 (PET)
- UBIGEO: 040806

Puyca District is one of eleven districts of the province La Unión in Peru.

== Geography ==
The Wansu mountain range traverses the district. Some of the highest peaks of the district are listed below:

- Anka Phawa (Cond.-La Unión)
- Anka Phawa (Puyca)
- Anqasi
- Challwa Q'asa
- Chawpi Chawpi
- Chunta
- Chhijmuni
- Janq'u Q'awa
- Kuntur K'uchu
- Kunturi (Cond.-La Unión)
- Kunturi (Ikmaqucha)
- Kunturi (La Unión)
- Kunturillu
- Llimphiq
- Minasniyuq
- Pichaqani
- Pilluni
- Pirqasqa
- Puka Ranra
- Puka Suntu
- Qillqata
- Qullpa
- Qullpa K'uchu
- Q'illu Urqu
- Rumi Urqu
- Taypi Q'awa
- Tintaya
- Thujsa
- Wachu Willka
- Waraqu
- Waych'awi
- Wayta Urqu
- Waytani
- Yana Yana
- Yuraq Punta
- Yuraq Rumi
- Yuraq Urqu

== Ethnic groups ==
The people in the district are mainly indigenous citizens of Quechua descent. Quechua is the language which the majority of the population (95.85%) learnt to speak in childhood, 3.96% of the residents started speaking using the Spanish language (2007 Peru Census).

== See also ==
- Ikmaqucha
- Mawk'allaqta
