= Kunturillu (Arequipa) =

Mountain in Peru

- Location within Peru

Highest point
- Elevation: 5,100 m (16,700 ft)
- Coordinates: 14°49′56″S 72°28′8″W

Geography
- Location: Peru, Arequipa Region, La Unión Province
- Parent range: Andes, Wansu

Kunturillu (Quechua for "black and white", Hispanicized spelling Condorillo) is a mountain in the Wansu mountain range in the Andes of Peru, about 5,100 metres (16,732 ft) high. It is situated in the Arequipa Region, La Unión Province, Puyca District. It lies southwest of Qullpa K'uchu and Minasniyuq and northeast of Puka Ranra.

The Kunturillu River (Condorillo) originates at the mountain. It flows to the southeast as a right tributary of the Uqururu (Aymara and Quechua for Mimulus glabratus, Hispanicized Ojoruro). This river is also known as Sumana or Cotahuasi. It flows to the Cotahuasi Canyon in the southwest.
