= Sayla District =

Coordinates: 15.3193°S 73.2225°W

Sayla
- District
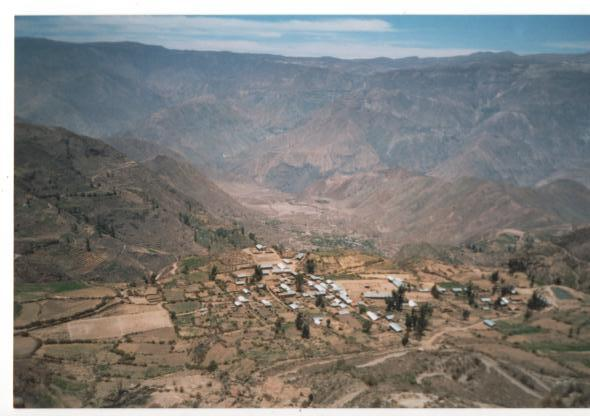
- Interactive map of Sayla
- Country: Peru
- Region: Arequipa
- Province: La Unión
- Capital: Sayla

Government
  - Mayor: Felix Santos Davalos Davalos

Area
  - Total: 66.55 km^{2} (25.70 sq mi)
- Elevation: 3,534 m (11,594 ft)

Population (2005 census)
  - Total: 502
  - Density: 7.54/km^{2} (19.5/sq mi)
- Time zone: UTC-5 (PET)
- UBIGEO: 040808

Sayla District is one of eleven districts of the province La Unión in Peru.

== Ethnic groups ==
The people in the district are mainly indigenous citizens of Quechua descent. Quechua is the language which the majority of the population (54.41%) learnt to speak in childhood, 44.56% of the residents started speaking using the Spanish language (2007 Peru Census).
