= Mawk'allaqta, La Unión =

Archaeological site in Peru

Mawk'allaqta
- Location: Peru, Arequipa Region, La Unión Province
- Region: Andes

Mawk'allaqta, also Mawk'a Llaqta (Quechua mawk'a ancient, llaqta place (village, town, city, country, nation), "ancient place", Hispanicized spelling Maukallakta) is an archaeological site in Peru. It is located in the Arequipa Region, La Unión Province, Puyca District, located about 2 kilometers from Puyca.

Mawk'allaqta is the largest and most important archaeological complex of the Cotahuasi valley. Developed by the Wari culture, it was strategically located on trading routes. Later it was occupied by the Allcca and later still by the Inca, who used it as a center of religious and military administration in the valley. In the 21st century, the complex is included within the Cotahuasi Subbasin Landscape Reserve.

== Description ==
Mawk'allaqta is believed to be an administrative center developed by the Wari culture, which was active about 500CE to 1000CE, prior to the Inca Empire. The large archeological complex is located on a plateau between the Huarcaya and Sumana rivers, which merge downstream to form the Cotahuasi River. Approximately 50 stone structures have been identified on the site, which includes about 25 tombs on the east side of the complex.

The complex was strategically located, enabling Inca control of the trading routes between Cusco and the coast. The Capac Ñan network intersected here with the Contisuyo networks and connected the heart of Tahuantinsuyo Cuzco with the coast of Arequipa.

== See also ==
- Llamuqa

== Sources ==
- PLAN DE TURISMO DE LA PROVINCIA DE LA UNIÓN 2007- 2021, La Unión Province
- REVISTA SOLIMANA, 1999 (ASOCIACIÓN PROVINCIAL LA UNIÓN APLU)
- GOMEZ ZANABRIA, GONZALO. HISTORIA Y CULTURA DE LA PROVINCIA DE LA UNION-AREQUIPA, MPLU-UCSN, 2010
- HISTORIA DEL DISTRITO DE ALCA, 2011, MUNICIPALIDAD DE ALCA
