= Juan Manuel Guillén =

Peruvian philosopher and politician

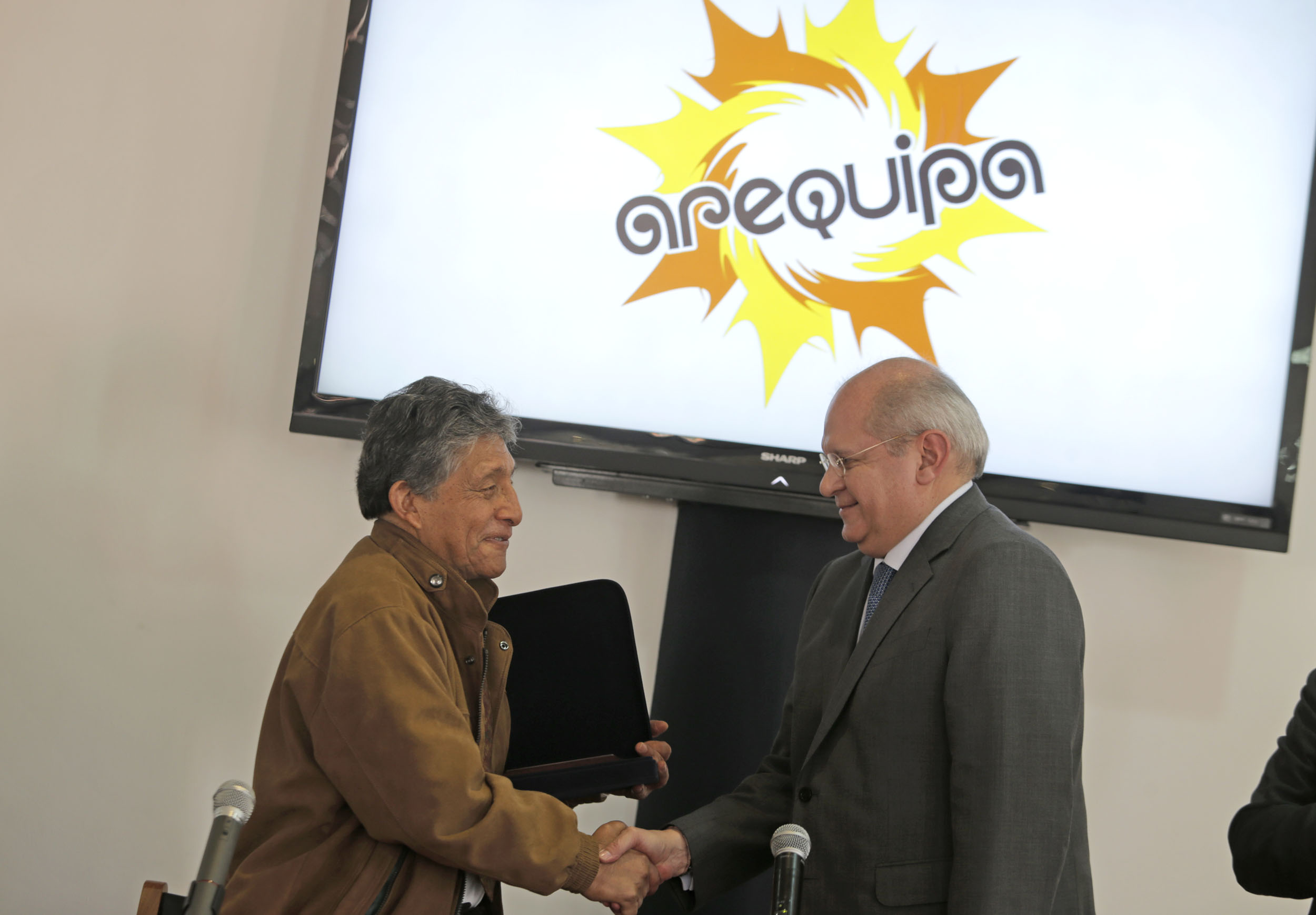

Juan Manuel Guillén Benavides (born November 24, 1941) is a Peruvian philosopher and politician. From 2007 to 2014, he served as President of the Arequipa Region.

== Biography ==
Guillén was born on November 24, 1941, in Arequipa city. Guillén's initial education was at school Nº9513 and Nº951 followed by the Colegio Nacional Independencia Americana. Between 1960 and 1964, Guillén studied philosophy at the National University of St Augustin of Arequipa (UNSA), earning a PhD. From 1973 to 1975, Guillén was director of the philosophy program at UNSA.

From 1999 to 2002, Guillén was mayor of Arequipa. He was credited with leading the 2002 protests against plans to privatize the region's electrical utilities. Guillén was President of the Arequipa region from January 2007 through June 2010, and again from October 2010 through December 2014.

== See also ==
- Arequipa region
