= Puka Suntu =

Mountain in Peru

- Location within Peru

Highest point
- Elevation: 5,200 m (17,100 ft)
- Coordinates: 14°46′59″S 72°35′00″W

Geography
- Location: Peru, Arequipa Region, La Unión Province
- Parent range: Andes, Wansu

Puka Suntu (Quechua puka red, suntu heap, pile, "red heap", Hispanicized spelling Pucasunto) is a mountain in the Wansu mountain range in the Andes of Peru, about 5,200 metres (17,060 ft) high. It lies in the Arequipa Region, La Unión Province, Puyca District. Puka Suntu is situated at the bank of the Qumpi P'allqa River (Compepalca). Yuraq Rumi is to the northeast, beyond the river.
