= Tauria District =

Coordinates: 15.3526°S 73.2373°W

Tauria
- District
- Interactive map of Tauria
- Country: Peru
- Region: Arequipa
- Province: La Unión
- Founded: November 19, 1954
- Capital: Tauria

Government
  - Mayor: Efrain Guillermo Sanchez Medina

Area
  - Total: 314.68 km^{2} (121.50 sq mi)
- Elevation: 2,900 m (9,500 ft)

Population (2005 census)
  - Total: 357
  - Density: 1.13/km^{2} (2.94/sq mi)
- Time zone: UTC-5 (PET)
- UBIGEO: 040809

Tauria District is one of eleven districts of the province La Unión in Peru.

== Ethnic groups ==
The people in the district are mainly indigenous citizens of Quechua descent. Quechua is the language which the majority of the population (62.15%) learnt to speak in childhood, 37.54% of the residents started speaking using the Spanish language (2007 Peru Census).
