= Huachuhuilca =

Mountain in Peru

- Location within Peru

Highest point
- Elevation: 5,315 m (17,438 ft)
- Coordinates: 14°54′42″S 72°33′35″W

Geography
- Location: Peru, Arequipa Region, La Unión Province
- Parent range: Andes, Huanzo

Huachuhuilca (Quechua wachu ridge between two furrows row, willka grandchild, great-grandson, lineage, sacred, divine or Anadenanthera colubrina (a tree)) is a 5,315-metre-high (17,438 ft) mountain in the Huanzo mountain range in the Andes of Peru. It is situated in the Arequipa Region, La Unión Province, Puyca District, southwest of Lake Ecma.
