= Tintaya (Arequipa) =

Andean mountain in the Wansu/Huanzo range, Peru

- Location within Peru

Highest point
- Elevation: 5,230 m (17,160 ft)
- Coordinates: 14°48′05″S 72°33′16″W

Geography
- Location: Peru, Arequipa Region, La Unión Province
- Parent range: Andes, Wansu

Tintaya (Quechua for the cocoon which contains the chrysalis of the moth) is a 5,230-metre-high (17,159 ft) mountain in the Wansu mountain range in the Andes of Peru. It is located in the Arequipa Region, La Unión Province, Puyca District. Tintaya lies west of Yuraq Punta.
