= La Unión province, Peru =

Coordinates: 15.059567°S 72.691083°W

La Unión
- Province
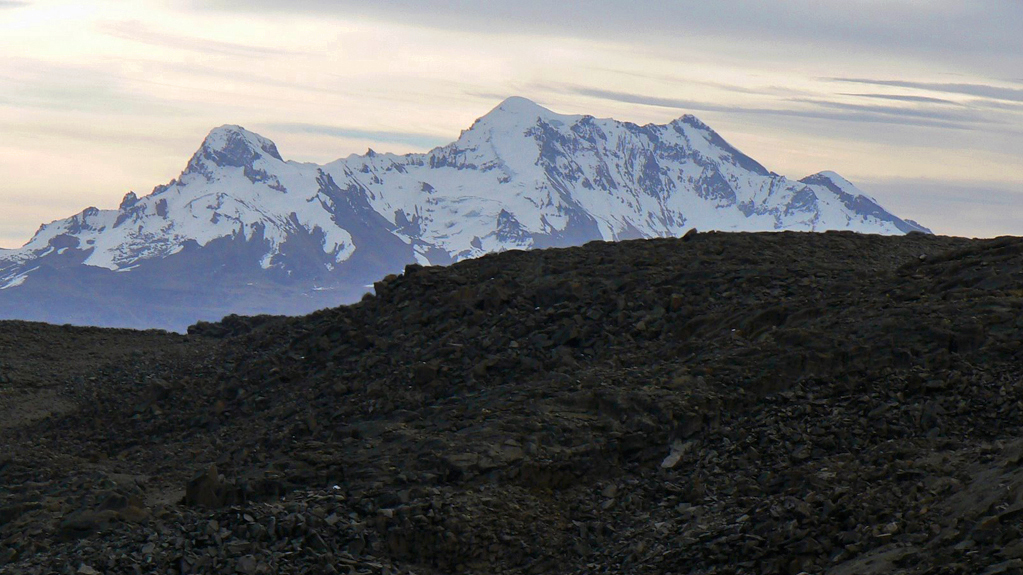
- Solimana volcano, La Unión Province

- Location of La Unión in the Arequipa Region
- Country: Peru
- Region: Arequipa
- Capital: Cotahuasi

Area
  - Total: 4,746.4 km^{2} (1,832.6 sq mi)
- Elevation: 2,388 m (7,835 ft)

Population
  - Total: 15,662
  - Density: 3.2998/km^{2} (8.5463/sq mi)
- UBIGEO: 0408
- Website: www.municotahuasi.gob.pe

La Unión is a province of the Arequipa Region in Peru. Its seat is Cotahuasi.

== Geography ==
The Huanzo mountain range traverses the province. One of the highest peaks of the province is Solimana at 6,093 metres (19,990 ft). Other mountains are listed below:

- Allqa Q'awa
- Allqa Walusa
- Anka Phawa (Cond.-La Unión)
- Anka Phawa (Puyca)
- Anqasi
- Aqu Suntu
- Aqu Suntu (Chullumpi)
- Challwa Q'asa
- Chawpi Chawpi
- Chullumpi
- Chunta
- Chunta Pata
- Chhijmuni
- Ch'uwañuma
- Hatun Pata
- Hatun Sisiwa
- Inti Utka
- Janq'u Q'awa
- Kimsa Chata
- Khirki Urqu
- Khuchi Pata
- Lujmani
- Lunq'u
- Llamuqa
- Llimphiq
- Kuntur K'uchu
- Kuntur Sayana
- Kunturi (Cond.-La Unión)
- Kunturi (Ikmaqucha)
- Kunturi (La Unión)
- Kunturillu
- Minasniyuq
- Paxsi
- Pichaqani
- Pilluni
- Pirqasqa
- Pisti Q'asa
- Puka Ranra
- Puka Suntu
- Puka Urqu
- P'umpu Q'asa
- Qarwa K'uchu
- Qarwa Urqu
- Qillqata
- Kimsa Qaqa
- Qullpa
- Qullpa K'uchu
- Q'illu Urqu
- Rumi Urqu
- Saraqutu
- Sullu Marka
- Sunqu Urqu
- Suphu Marka
- Taruja Marka
- Taypi Q'awa
- Tintaya
- Thujsa
- T'ula Qaqa
- Uma Q'asa
- Waych'awi
- Wachu Willka
- Waraqu
- Wayrawiri
- Wayta Urqu
- Waytani
- Wila Quta
- Wiñaw
- Yana Yana
- Yuraq Apachita
- Yuraq Punta
- Yuraq Rumi
- Yuraq Urqu

== Political division ==
The province is divided into eleven districts which are

- Alca
- Charcana
- Cotahuasi (Province Seat)
- Huaynacotas
- Pampamarca
- Puyca
- Quechualla
- Sayla
- Tauria
- Tomepampa
- Toro

== Ethnic groups ==
The people in the province are mainly indigenous citizens of Quechua descent. Quechua is the language which the majority of the population (59.18%) learnt to speak in childhood, 40.06% of the residents started speaking using the Spanish language (2007 Peru Census).

== See also ==
- Cotahuasi Subbasin Landscape Reserve
- Ikmaqucha
- Mawk'allaqta
- Wansuqucha
