= Apu (god) =

Tutelary mountain spirits in Indigenous Andean cultures

- Protector mountain spirits
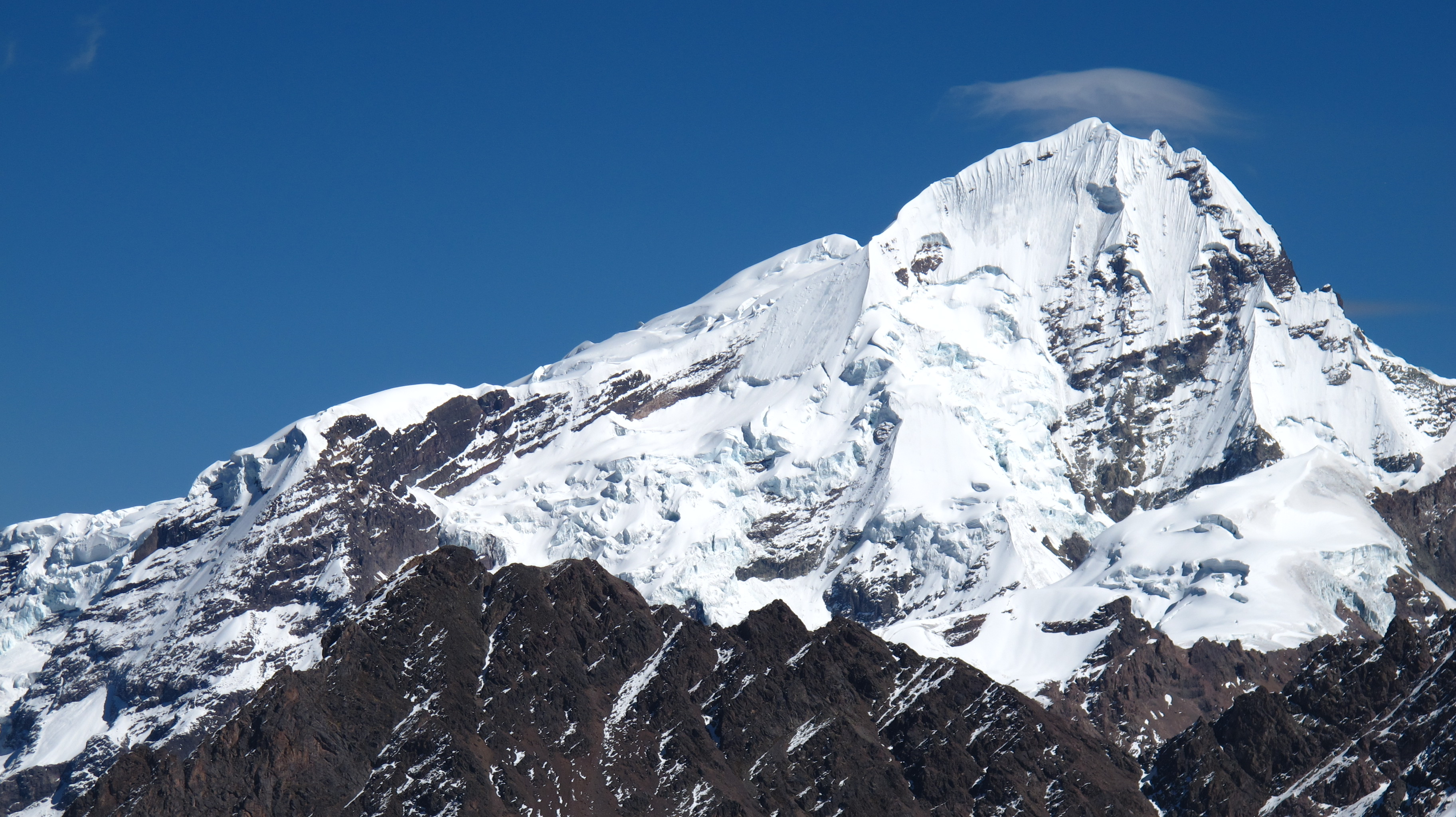
- Apu Ausangate in Peru
- Other names: awkillu, wamani, machula, achachila, mallku, si-pong
- Venerated in: Peru and Bolivia
- Animals: Condor
- Ethnic group: Quechua people, Q'ero, Aymara people

Apu (Quechua pronunciation: [ˈa.pʊ], lit. 'lord' or 'sacred mountain') are the spirits of certain mountains and volcanos, that protect the local people in the traditional religion and mythology of the Andean civilizations of Peru and Bolivia. Depending on the language and the region, apu are also called awkillu, wamani, machula, achachila, mallku, and si-pong.

While some researchers, such as Christian Mader and colleagues, view these sacred mountains as the dwelling place of powerful deities and ancestors, others, such as Ana Mariella Bacigalupo and Guillermo Salas Carreño, contend that the apu are the actual mountains.

Apu are one type of wak'a, which refer to material manifestation of the divine, and can include temples, shrines, sculptures, natural landforms, as well as other material objects and bodies.

== Meaning ==
Apu means "Lord" in Quechua as well as sacred mountain or mountain deity.

Apu is the most common name for mountain spirits in the Cuzco region of Peru, while they are usually called awkillu in Huanuco, wamani in Ayacucho, machula, achachila, or mallku in different regions in Bolivia, and si-pong in the Chimu language. Despite the various names, Victoria Castro and Carlos Aldunate argue that due to their similarities, they likely represent a Pan-Andean type of spirit. Stella Nair also views apu as Pan-Andean spirits with regional differences.

Johan Reinhard states that these various names for mountain deities are sometimes used as different names for the same type of spirit, but are also used in certain regions to describe the deities who occupy certain levels in a spirit hierarchy, with the most powerful deities residing in the tallest mountains.

== History ==
The veneration of mountain peaks possibly dates back to the Initial Period of the pre-hispanic Andes, which took place from 2000 to 900 BCE.

Apu Campana was worshipped and appeased via human sacrifices and through the offerings of food and beverages, by the Moche, Chimu, and Incan Empires. Incan use of mountains as sites of child sacrifices may have functioned to request irrigation water or to claim legitimacy.

The Inca Empire placed their buildings, shrines, and terraces at sacred locations including apu and abnormal outcrops, which were viewed as shrines of Pachamama. By doing so, they were able to transform the power of the land to themselves, give themselves spiritual authority, and control access to these sacred spaces.

As Catholicism was adopted by Indigenous people in the Andes, there was a decrease in and hostility towards traditional Andean religious beliefs, including the worship of apu.

Since 2012, curanderos (traditional healers) have engaged in spiritual tourism, where tourists will pay curanderos to perform ceremonies to invoke the apu to heal them.

== Role and powers ==
Apu serve as protector deities, are connected to water, fertility, livestock, and agriculture in the area near where they reside, and are responsible for the distribution of natural resources. The role of mountain deities as a protector in Andean religion also causes them to serve as war deities.

Andean mountain spirits form a hierarchy based on the height of their peaks, and apu communicate with each other across regions, with the taller and higher-ranking apu giving orders to the shorter and lower-ranking ones, in order to properly manage natural resources.

In Quechua cosmology, apu connect the three pachas (worlds of existence): Hanaq pacha (cosmic reality), kay pacha (worldly reality), and Uray pacha (the underworld).

When someone is harmed as a result of interaction with a spirit, they can undo the damage caused by making an offering to Pachamama or an apu.

=== Recripriocal relationships with humans ===
In Andean communities, the relationship humans have with each other and with deities is often described with the word ayni, a Quechuan and Aymaran term meaning "reciprocity". In this system, relationships are maintained through continually giving and receiving gifts. The need for rituals to be continually performed, means that the relationship humans have with the divine can alternate between being in balance and being imbalanced. This reciprocal relationship is mostly discussed with relationships between humans and between humans and divinities, but also exists between humans and the natural world, humans and ancestors, and between non-human entities.

For the Quechua-speaking Q'ero community, different entities in the universe live according to a hierarchy, with apu and Pachamama on the top, then humans, and then alpacas and llamas. Ancestors also occupy a level in the hierarchy.

An example of the modern-day maintenance of relationships with apu is seen in the response to mining apu among Indigenous Andeans. Miranda Sheild Johansson argues that in contrast to open pit mining carried out by state or corporate actors, in Indigenous-led underground mining, the participants moderate the amount of materials they extract and conduct ritual feedings for the apu, and therefore maintain the communal relationshipship between humans and apu. Therefore, when valuable resources are discovered within apu, some Indigenous people feel that responsible small-scale mining carried out by Indigenous people for the benefit of Indigenous people, is an ethical way of extracting the minerals. Johansson thus views responsible small-scale mining as one part of the recriprocal relationship humans have with the animate land. When there was a rumor of gold being discovered in Apu Wayna Tanka in 2008, many Indigenous P'iya Qayma villagers viewed the apu as expecting the villagers to mine the gold in an ethical way, similar to how a field would expect to be ploughed.

If an apu is offended, they might cause harm to people residing nearby their mountain, through illness, accidents, natural disasters, or other means. For example, in the P'iya Qayma village in Bolivia, when a curandero named Don Facundo died at a relatively young age, many villagers believed that Apu Wayna Tanka killed him due to Don Facundo lapsing on his sacrifices, and breaking his deal with the apu. Apu will also replenish their life-force by "eating" people who die from illness or accidents near them.

For many Indigenous people, "believing" in apu gives them more power to harm you for your transgressions, causing some people to choose not to believe in them. However, they also contend, that apu are material beings, who still effect the environment and can still harm people who do not believe in them. For example, an Indigenous man named Pablo stated following a massive flood,

"I don't believe in Apu, because then they cannot get me... If you believe in Apu, then they can destroy your house with floods.... [My house] was destroyed anyway. The Apu was angry because I looted him and worked in the mines, so he destroyed my house. If I had fed him pagos of coca and fruit, maybe I would have a better life."

— Pablo, interviewed by Ana Mariella Bacigalupo, Pan-Indigenous Ethical Cosmopolitics, page 27

For this reason, some Indigenous people might choose not believe in apu, but still venerate and feed them with offerings.

== Modern day veneration ==
While Indigenous Andeans believed they could directly understand apus' moods in the past, today they can only be understood indirectly through signs such as a person's health, events, or through dreams. Apus can directly interact with other deities and with humans by taking the shape of humans and certain animals (such as condors and other large birds of prey). They can also communicate through altomisayuq (a high rank of paqos, traditional healers) and parajes (helping spirits which themselves can be considered aspects of the apu).

=== Rites ===
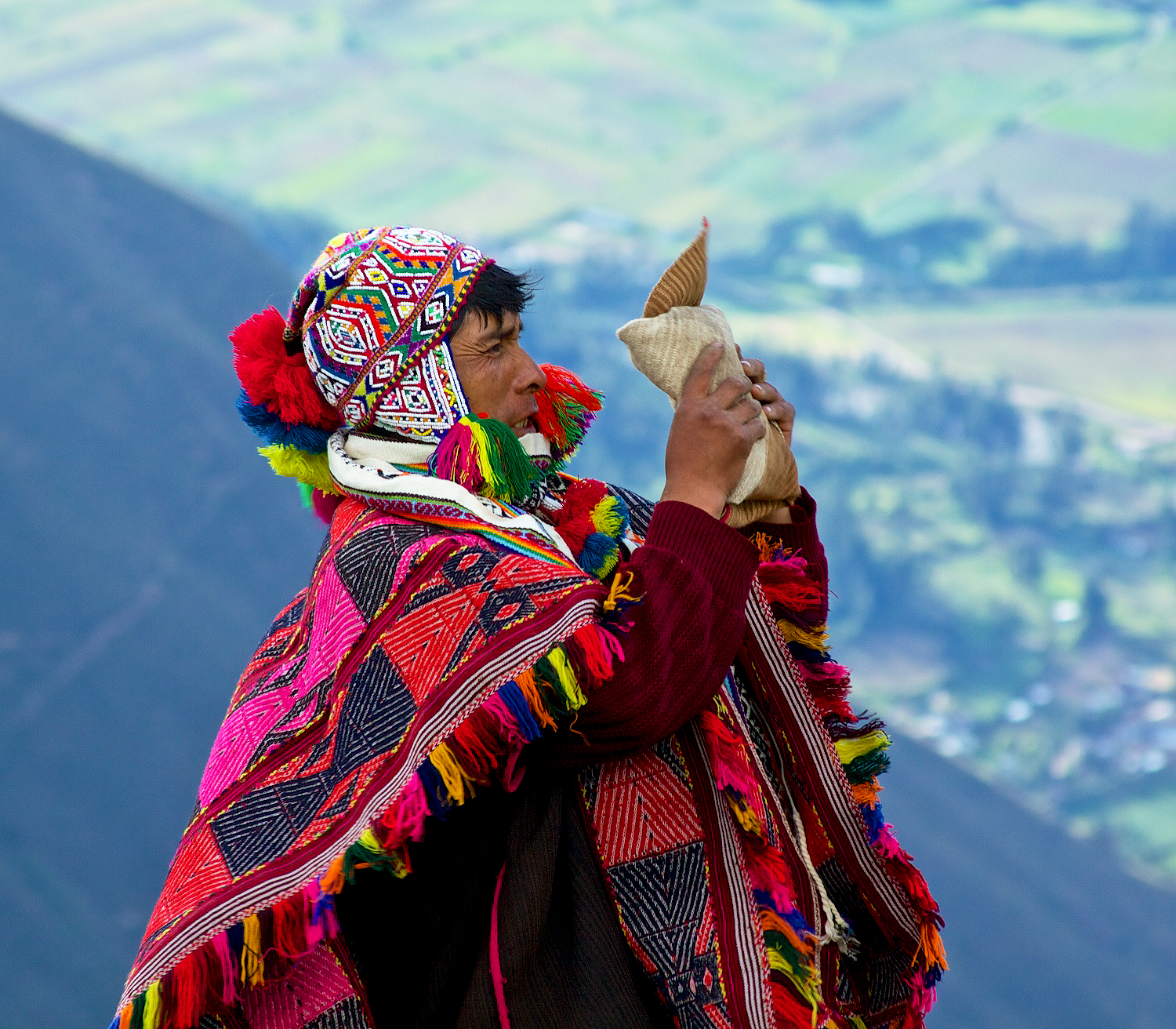
A Paqo (traditional healer) asking an Apu to bless a mesa

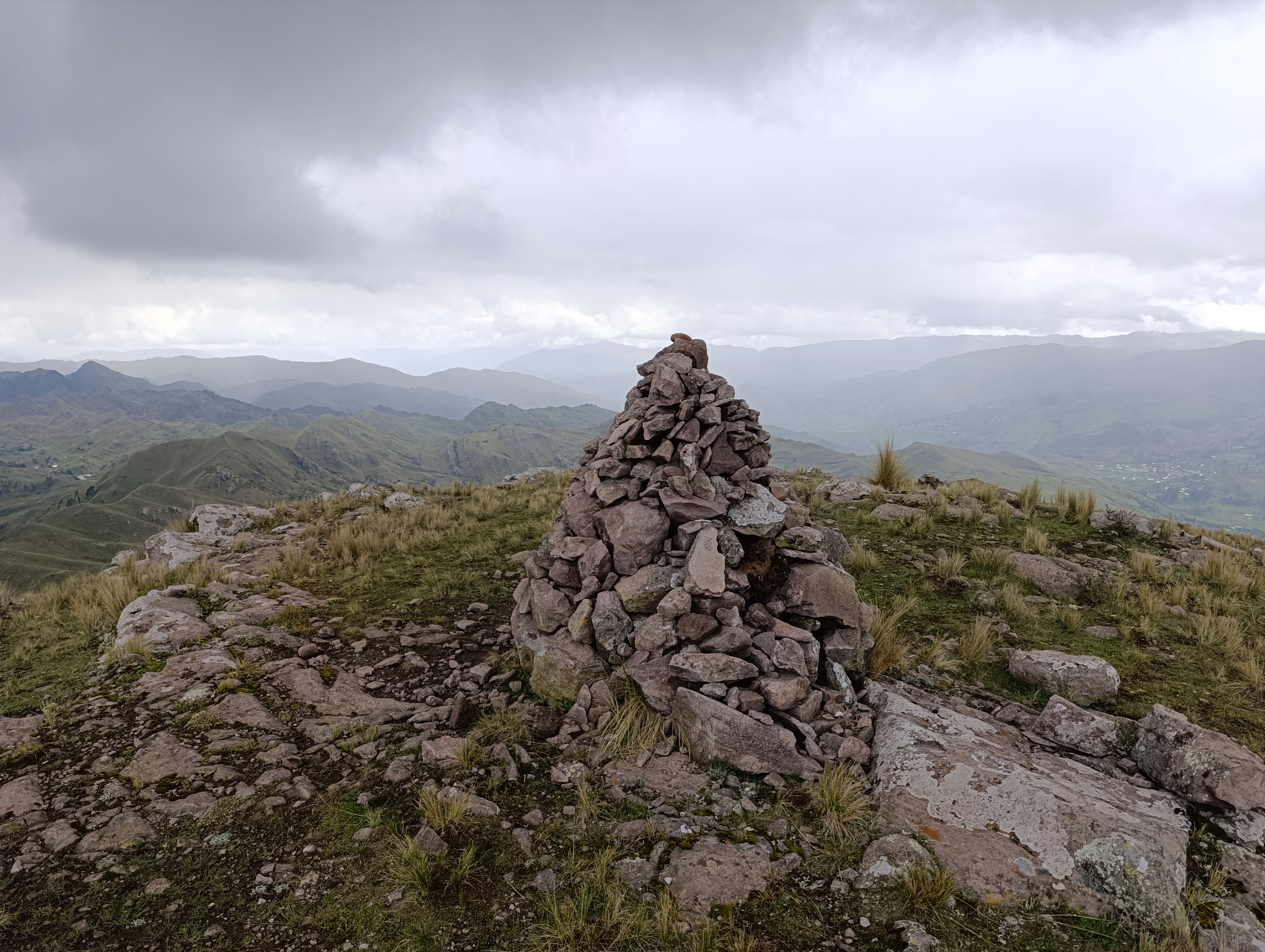
Apacheta on the path to the top of Apu Mamá Simona

Today, apu are venerated today in a variety of rites. For example, in the Palpa district of Peru, local people will bring seawater to the summit of the apu, Cerro Llamocca to ask for rain during periods of drought.

Another rite that is performed for apu is pago, in which one blows on coca leaves to bring their prayers to the apu. The specific details of this ritual vary in different communities, but they usually involve coca leaves, llama fat, sugar alcohol, cigarettes, and sometimes involved animal sacrifices.

In the coastal area of Northern Peru, curanderos will channel the consciousness of apu through ceremonially ingesting a mescaline brew made from Wachuma (San Pedro cactus) and the use of mesa (a portable altar or medicine bundle containing ceremonial objects) that serve as a representation of the cosmos.

In the Uchumiri Community in Yanaquihua District in Peru, the Esquela Tusuy dance is a ritual that honors both Pachamama as well as Apu Coropuna, in order to provide for the safe return of llama herders.

Apu are also venerated through the incremental building of stone piles called apachetas by passer-bys.

=== Veneration among Christians ===
Apu and other mountain deities are also venerated among Christians in the Andes.

One way this is done is by associating saints with specific mountain deities For example, in the Huancavelica region of Peru, the Catholic saint Santiago is viewed as the spirit of the mountain Cerro Calvario. The spirit leaves the mountain at midnight on Santiago's feast day (July 25th) and returns midday on July 26th. During this time, the herranza livestock fertility ritual is celebrated, during which households will make offerings to the apu and Pachamama to ensure the health of their livestock. In addition, some Peruvian Christians believe Saint Peter holds the key to the spirit world within Apu Coropuna.

Some areas also use the cross as a symbol for the mountain deities. Indigenous people from Northern Peru oftentimes will make pagos to apu as well as to crosses, and some Indigenous Northern Peurivan curanderos have interpreted Saint Cyprian and Jesus as apu. In the Northern regions of Peru, many Indigenous curanderos will combine the Indigenous shamanic ideas of directly knowing something (conocer) that can be perceived or experienced, with the Christian idea of believing (creer) in beings like God and Jesus who are imperceptible. In this way, the curanderos can know the apu, while believing in God and Jesus.

Unlike in the modern Catholicism practiced in the Andes, Evangelical Protestants are expected to disavow apu, Pachamama, and other place-based spirits. Despite this, some Q'ero converts to Evangelicalism will continue to venerate apu and Pachamama in secret.

== Apu and environmentalism ==
Some Indigenous Andeans view the effects of climate change as expressions of apu's pain and wrath for disrespecting and corrupting the natural world. In this worldview, apu are turned to as ethical leaders to guide humans towards a respectful coexistence with the Earth. Corruption, greed, and environmental destruction are often viewed as stemming from the same source, which is a disrespect of the sentient world. Therefore, to protect apu from mining and industrial agriculture, activists must also fight corruption and greed. Apu help in this fight, by offering spiritual protection from the government officials, mining companies, and others who wish to harm both apu and the community.

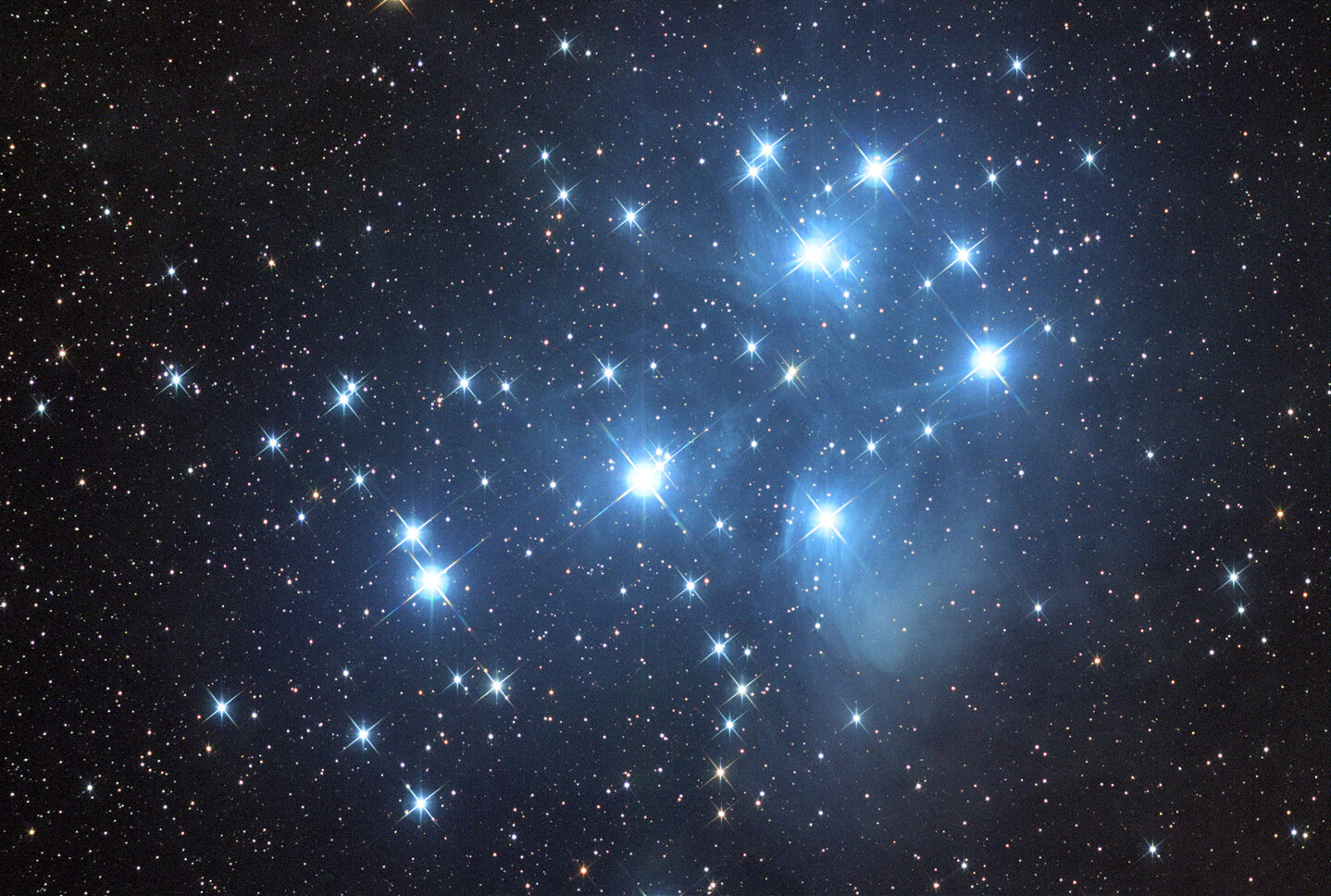
Pleaides taken from Kitt Peak Visitor Center in Tucson, Arizona, United States

Traditionally, The Q'ero community decided when to plant tubers for a successful harvest, by appointing a community member as an arariwa, to observe the Pleiades and make offerings to an apu and Pachamama. A poor harvest is viewed as the arariwa failing to fulfill their role. In recent times, climate change has increased the chances of a poor harvest, making the arariwa's task increasingly difficult.

Some Q'ero view the effects of climate change as a scientific phenomenon and others view it as the end of the current cycle of time. However, most Q'ero view the effects of climate change as them losing their ability to communicate with and receive gifts from apu and Pachamama. This is viewed as the result of the Q'ero abandoning some of their traditional ceremonial practices that link them with apu and Pachamama, and the decreasing scope and participation of the practices that remain. Evangelical churches, particularly the Maranata Church, proselytizing to the Q'ero and the conversion of some Q'ero people to these faiths, are also viewed as a contributor to the fraying of relationships with non-human divinites.

However, despite the increase in climate change related devastation, many Q'ero still venerate apu and Pachamama, and note that this is not the first time they have had difficulty influencing the natural environment. In order to survive the impacts of climate change, many Q'ero are working to re-establish frayed relationships, and maintain existing relationships with apu and Pachamama.

== Characteristics ==
While apus can be considered either masculine or feminine, they are usually thought of as male, complementing Pachamama, who is female. Apus and have varying personalities, with some being protectors and others being malicious. Apus are the most active in the month of August and apus can have romantic and familial ties with each other.

Apus are frequently associated with condors and are often seen as ancestors.

== In literature and the arts ==
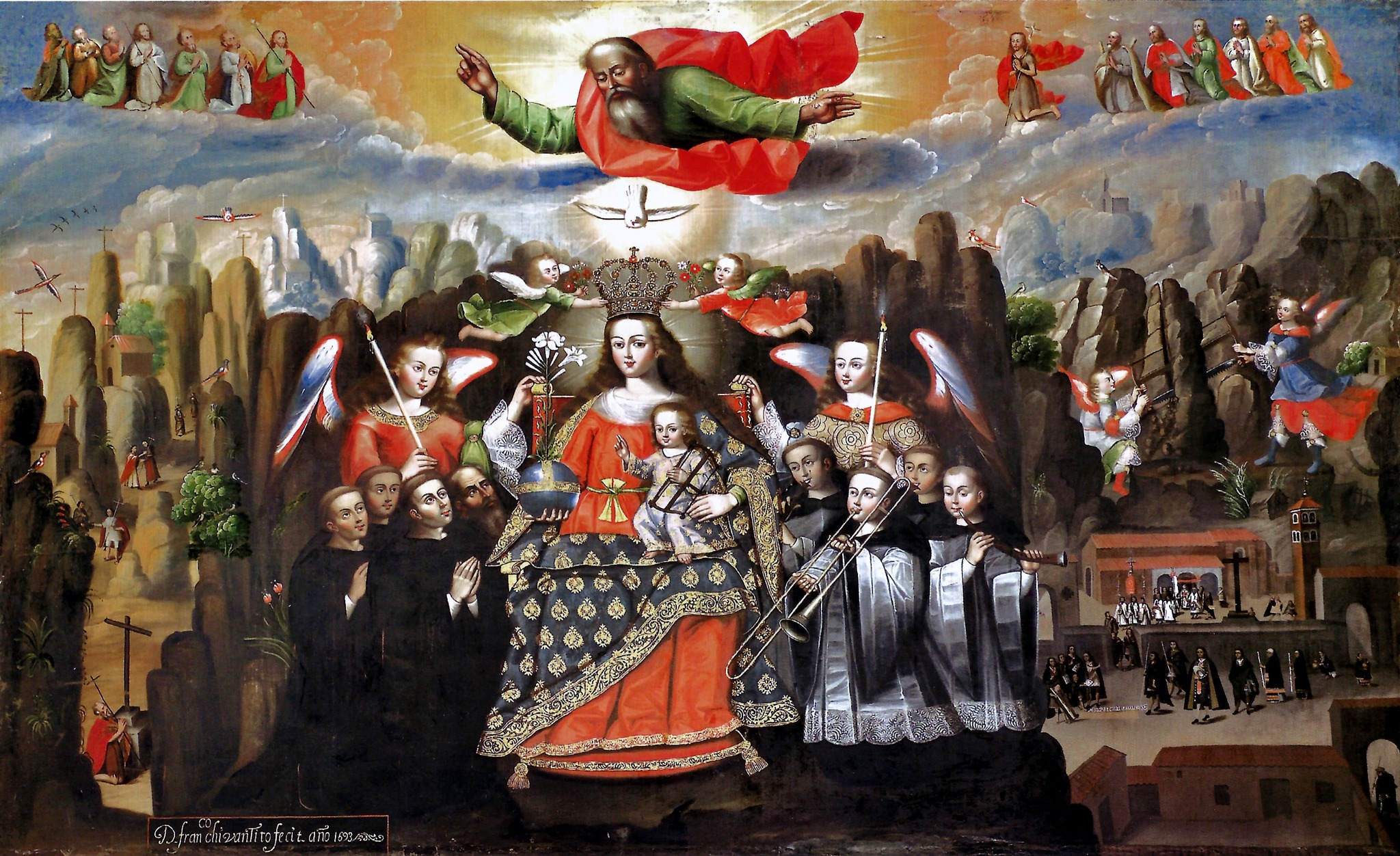
A painting of the Virgin of Montserrat holding the Christ Child surrounded by acolytes and friars. To the right angels saw an apu, representing the destruction of traditional Andean religion by Christianity

The hostility to traditional Andean religion during the adoption of Catholicism is expressed in the Indigenous artist Francisco Chihuantito's 1693 painting Virgen de Monserrat, which depicts angels sawing an apu.

The 1998 novella Apu Kolki Hirka: dios montaña de plata (transl. Apu Kolki Hirka: God Silver Mountain) by the Peruivan author Macedonio Villafán Broncano, is narrated by a fictional apu, Kolki Hirka, whose sacred nature is progressively ignored from the pre-Hispanic period to Spanish colonization to mining in the modern age.

== Specific apu ==
=== In Peru ===
==== Arequipa region ====
- Pichu Pichu
- Llamocca
- Solimana

==== Cuzco region ====
- Ausangate
- Wamanlipa
- Wanakawri
- Cerro Wiracochan

==== La Libertad region ====
- Campana

==== Mmoquegua region ====
- Cerro Baúl

==== Puno region ====
- Coline

=== In Bolivia ===
==== Cochabamba region ====
- Wayna Tanka

== See also ==
- El Tío – Bolivian mine guardian deity
- Supay – Inca and Andean underworld deity or spirit, later associated with the Christian Devil
