= Quelcata (Condesuyos-La Unión) =

Mountain in Peru

- Location within Peru

Highest point
- Elevation: 5,000 m (16,000 ft)
- Coordinates: 14°59′37″S 72°24′37″W

Geography
- Location: Peru, Arequipa Region, Condesuyos Province, La Unión Province
- Parent range: Andes, Huanzo

Quelcata (possibly from Aymara qillqaña to write, -ta a suffix to indicate the participle, "written" or "something written") is a mountain in the Huanzo mountain range in the Andes of Peru, about 5,000 metres (16,404 ft) high. It is located in the Condesuyos Province, Cayarani District, and in the La Unión Province, Puyca District. Quelcata lies southeast of the mountain Pillune, southwest of the mountain Ancojahua and east of the mountain Chuañuma.
