= Coronel Castañeda District =

District in Peru

Coordinates: 14°41′38″S 74°07′27″W

Coronel Castañeda
- District
- Interactive map of Coronel Castañeda
- Country: Peru
- Region: Ayacucho
- Province: Parinacochas
- Founded: June 28, 1955; 71 years ago
- Capital: Aniso

Government
  - Mayor: Wilman Accilio Crespo Alvarez

Area
  - Total: 1,108.04 km^{2} (427.82 sq mi)
- Elevation: 3,620 m (11,880 ft)

Population (2005 census)
  - Total: 1,120
  - Density: 1.01/km^{2} (2.62/sq mi)
- Time zone: UTC-5 (PET)
- UBIGEO: 050703

Coronel Castañeda District is one of eight districts of the Parinacochas Province in Peru.

== Geography ==
One of the highest peaks of the district is Lunq'u at 5,224 m (17,139 ft). Other mountains are listed below:

- Anta Qullu
- Chachakuma
- Challwa Q'asa
- Hatun Q'asa
- Kiswarani
- Kuntur K'ark'a
- Kunturillu
- Maranniyuq
- Milluni
- Pacha Pata
- Pilluni
- Pirqa
- Puka Kunka
- Puka Qucha
- Puka Ranra
- Puya
- Qullqa
- Quripa Qucha
- Qhata Urqu
- Q'illu
- Raqch'i Pata
- Sura Q'asa
- Taya Pampa
- Uqhu Pata
- Waqta Kancha
- Waraqa Pampa
- Waylla Marka
- Wit'u
- Yana Qaqa
- Yanama
- Yuraq Pata

== Ethnic groups ==
The people in the district are mainly indigenous citizens of Quechua descent. Quechua is the language which the majority of the population (70.89%) learnt to speak in childhood, 28.37% of the residents started speaking using the Spanish language (2007 Peru Census).
