= Wansuqucha =

Lake in Apurimac, Peru

- Location within Peru
- Location: Peru; Arequipa Region
- Coordinates: 15°00′49″S 72°51′1.1″W
- Surface elevation: 4,807 m (15,771 ft)

Wansuqucha (Quechua qucha lake, Hispanicized spellings Huanzoccocha, Huanzococha, also Wansuqocha) is a lake in Peru located in the Arequipa Region, La Unión Province, Huaynacotas District. It is situated at a height of about 4,807 m (15,771 ft), at the foot of the mountain Wansu.
