= Kimsa Chata (Arequipa) =

Mountain in Peru

- Location within Peru

Highest point
- Elevation: 5,091 m (16,703 ft)
- Coordinates: 14°42′15″S 72°46′08″W

Geography
- Location: Peru, Arequipa Region
- Parent range: Andes, Wansu

Kimsa Chata (Aymara and Quechua kimsa three, Pukina chata mountain, "three mountains", Hispanicized spelling Quimsachata) is a group of three mountains in the Wansu mountain range in the Andes of Peru. Its central peak reaches 5,091 metres (16,703 ft) above sea level. It is situated in the Arequipa Region, La Unión Province, Huaynacotas District. Kimsa Chata lies at the Yana Wanaku valley ("black guanaco", Yanahuanaco) southeast of Hatun Pata.
