= Puka Ranra (Apurímac-Ayacucho) =

Mountain in Peru

- Location within Peru

Highest point
- Elevation: 5,000 m (16,000 ft)
- Coordinates: 14°41′39″S 72°54′47″W

Geography
- Location: Peru, Apurímac Region, Ayacucho Region
- Parent range: Andes, Wansu

Puka Ranra (Quechua puka red, ranra stony; stony ground, "red, stony ground", hispanicized spelling Pucaranra) is a mountain in the Wansu mountain range in the Andes of Peru, about 5,000 metres (16,404 ft) high. It is located in the Apurímac Region, Antabamba Province, Juan Espinoza Medrano District, and in the Ayacucho Region, Parinacochas Province, Coronel Castañeda District.
