= Challwa Q'asa (Ayacucho) =

Mountain in Peru

- Location within Peru

Highest point
- Elevation: 4,800 m (15,700 ft)
- Coordinates: 14°47′03″S 72°58′40″W

Geography
- Location: Peru, Ayacucho Region, Parinacochas Province
- Parent range: Andes, Wansu

Challwa Q'asa (Quechua challwa fish, q'asa mountain pass, "fish pass", also spelled Chayhuajasa) is a mountain in the Wansu mountain range in the Andes of Peru, about 4,800 metres (15,748 ft) high. It is located in the Ayacucho Region, Parinacochas Province, Coronel Castañeda District.
