= Qarwa Urqu =

Mountain in Peru

- Location within Peru

Highest point
- Elevation: 5,000 m (16,000 ft)
- Coordinates: 14°47′46″S 72°45′04″W

Geography
- Location: Peru, Arequipa Region
- Parent range: Andes, Wansu

Qarwa Urqu (Quechua qarwa pale, yellowish, golden, urqu mountain, "yellowish mountain", hispanicized spelling Carhua Orjo) is a mountain in the Wansu mountain range in the Andes of Peru, about 5,000 metres (16,404 ft) high. It is situated in the Arequipa Region, La Unión Province, Huaynacotas District. Qarwa Urqu lies at the Yana Wanaku valley ("black guanaco", Yanahuanaco) northeast of Aqu Suntu and east of Wayrawiri.
