= Qarwa K'uchu =

Mountain in Peru

- Location within Peru

Highest point
- Elevation: 5,000 m (16,000 ft)
- Coordinates: 14°53′47″S 72°53′54″W

Geography
- Location: Peru, Arequipa Region
- Parent range: Andes, Wansu

Qarwa K'uchu (Quechua qarwa pale, yellowish, golden, k'uchu corner, "yellowish corner", Hispanicized spelling Carhuacucho) is a mountain in the Wansu mountain range in the Andes of Peru, about 5,000 metres (16,404 ft) high. It is situated in the Arequipa Region, La Unión Province, Pampamarca District. Qarwa K'uchu lies northwest of Kimsa Qaqa.
