= Ancojahua (mountain) =

Mountain in Peru

- Location within Peru

Highest point
- Elevation: 5,200 m (17,100 ft)
- Coordinates: 14°57′30″S 72°22′30″W

Geography
- Location: Peru, Arequipa Region, Condesuyos Province, La Unión Province
- Parent range: Andes, Huanzo

Ancojahua (possibly from Aymara janq'u white, q'awa little river, ditch, crevice, fissure, gap in the earth, "white brook" or "white ravine") is a mountain in the Huanzo mountain range in the Andes of Peru, about 5,200 metres (17,060 ft) high. It is situated in the Arequipa Region, Condesuyos Province, Cayarani District, and in the La Unión Province, Puyca District. Ancojahua lies south of Condori, southwest of Yana Yana, northeast of Quelcata and east of Pillune. There is a group of lakes southeast of Ancojahua named Ancascocha (possibly from Quechua for "blue lake").
