= Hatun Sisiwa =

Mountain in Peru

- Location within Peru

Highest point
- Elevation: 5,003 m (16,414 ft)
- Coordinates: 14°53′56″S 72°43′52″W

Geography
- Location: Peru, Arequipa Region
- Parent range: Andes, Wansu

Hatun Sisiwa (Quechua hatun big, Hispanicized spelling Jatun Sisihua) is a 5,003-metre-high (16,414 ft) mountain in the Wansu mountain range in the Andes of Peru. It is situated in the Arequipa Region, La Unión Province, Huaynacotas District. Hatun Sisiwa lies northeast of Sullu Marka.
