= Regional Government of Arequipa =

Regional government in Peru

- Gobierno Regional de Arequipa

Regional Government overview
- Formed: January 1, 2003; 22 years ago
- Jurisdiction: Department of Arequipa
- Headquarters: Arequipa
- Website: Government site

The Regional Government of Arequipa (Spanish: Gobierno Regional de Arequipa; GORE Arequipa) is the regional government that represents the Department of Arequipa. It is the body with legal identity in public law and its own assets, which is in charge of the administration of provinces of the department in Peru. Its purpose is the social, cultural and economic development of its constituency. It is based in the city of Arequipa.

== List of representatives ==
Governor	Political party	Period
Daniel Vera Ballón	APRA	January 1, 2003–December 31, 2006
Juan Manuel Guillén	Arequipa, Tradición y Futuro	January 1, 2007–January 31, 2010
Juan Manuel Guillén	Alianza por Arequipa	January 1, 2011–December 31, 2014
Yamila Osorio Delgado	Arequipa, Tradición y Futuro	January 1, 2015–December 31, 2018
Élmer Cáceres Llica	Arequipa - Unidos por el Gran Cambio	January 1, 2019–October 25, 2021
Walter Gutiérrez Cueva	Arequipa - Unidos por el Gran Cambio	October 26, 2021–November 22, 2021
Kimmerlee Keily Gutiérrez Canahuire	Arequipa - Unidos por el Gran Cambio	December 3, 2021–December 31, 2022
Rohel Sánchez Sánchez	Yo Arequipa	January 1, 2023–Incumbent

== See also ==
- Regional Governments of Peru
- Department of Arequipa
