= Chhijmuni =

Mountain in Peru

- Location within Peru

Highest point
- Elevation: 5,080 m (16,670 ft)
- Coordinates: 14°51′42″S 72°38′16″W

Geography
- Location: Peru, Arequipa Region, La Unión Province
- Parent range: Andes, Wansu

Chhijmuni (Aymara chhijmu edible part of the clover plant, -ni a suffix to indicate ownership, "the one with the chhijmu", Hispanicized spelling Chicmune) is a 5,080-metre-high (16,667 ft) mountain in the Wansu mountain range in the Andes of Peru. It is located in the Arequipa Region, La Unión Province, Puyca District. Chhijmuni lies south of Wayta Urqu.
