= Lunq'u =

Mountain in Peru

- Location within Peru

Highest point
- Elevation: 5,224 m (17,139 ft)
- Coordinates: 14°45′45″S 72°50′42″W

Geography
- Location: Peru, Apurímac Region, Arequipa Region, Ayacucho Region
- Parent range: Andes, Wansu

Lunq'u (Quechua for fat, thick, plump / sphere, elliptical or round body / inhabitant of the coastal plains, Hispanicized spellings Lunco, erroneously also Limco) is a mountain in the Wansu mountain range in the Andes of Peru, about 5,224 metres (17,139 ft) high. It is situated in the Apurímac Region, Antabamba Province, Juan Espinoza Medrano District, in the Arequipa Region, La Unión Province, in the districts Huaynacotas and Pampamarca, and in the Ayacucho Region, Parinacochas Province, Coronel Castañeda District, where it is the easternmost point. The little river Lunq'u (Lunco) originates north of the mountain.

== See also ==
- Allqa Walusa
- Llamuqa
