= Kunturiri =

Kunturiri may refer to:

== Mountains ==
- Kunturiri (Bolivia and Chile), on the border of Bolivia and Chile
- Kunturiri (Chuquisaca), in the Chuquisaca Department, Bolivia
- Kunturiri (Frías), in the Tomás Frías Province, Potosí Department, Bolivia
- Kunturiri (La Paz), in the La Paz Municipality, Murillo Province, La Paz Department, Bolivia
- Kunturiri (Linares), in the José María Linare Province, Potosí Department, Bolivia
- Kunturiri (Loayza), in the Malla Municipality, Loayza Province, La Paz Department, Bolivia
- Kunturiri (Los Andes), in the Pukarani Municipality, Los Andes Province, La Paz Department, Bolivia
- Kunturiri (Pacajes), in the Pacajes Province, La Paz Department, Bolivia
- Kunturiri (Palca), in the Palca Municipality, Murillo Province, La Paz Department, Bolivia
- Kunturiri (Peru), a mountain in the Puno Region, Peru
- Kunturiri (Sajama), in the Turku Municipality, Sajama Province, Oruro Department, Bolivia

== Places ==
- Conduriri District in the Puno Region, Peru, and its seat Cunduriri

== See also ==
- Kunturi (disambiguation)
- Jach'a Kunturiri (Oruro), a mountain in the Curahuara de Carangas Municipality, Sajama Province, Oruro Department, Bolivia
- Jach'a Kunturiri (La Paz), a mountain at the border of Charaña Municipality and Qalaqutu Municipality, Pacajes Province, La Paz Department, Bolivia
- Jisk'a Kunturiri, a mountain in the Oruro Department, Bolivia
