= Jatun Huaychahui (mountain) =

Mountain in Peru

- Location within Peru

Highest point
- Elevation: 5,445 m (17,864 ft)
- Coordinates: 14°49′50″S 72°18′38″W

Geography
- Location: Peru, Cusco Region, Chumbivilcas Province, Arequipa Region
- Parent range: Andes, Huanzo

Jatun Huaychahui (possibly from Quechua hatun big, "big Huaychahui") also known as Huaychahui (possibly from Aymara waych'a Minthostachys mollis, -wi a suffix, "place of waych'a plants"), is a 5,445-metre-high (17,864 ft) mountain in the Andes of Peru. It is the highest mountain in the Huanzo mountain range. Jatun Huaychahui is located in the Arequipa Region, on the border of the Condesuyos Province, Cayarani District, and the La Unión Province, Puyca District, and in the Cusco Region, Chumbivilcas Province, Santo Tomás District. It lies southwest of Huiscatongo.
