= Wayta Urqu =

Mountain in Peru

- Location within Peru

Highest point
- Elevation: 5,100 m (16,700 ft)
- Coordinates: 14°51′03″S 72°38′12″W

Geography
- Location: Peru, Arequipa Region, La Unión Province
- Parent range: Andes, Wansu

Wayta Urqu (Quechua wayta crest; wild flower; the whistling of the wind, urqu mountain, Hispanicized spelling Huayta Orjo) is a mountain in the Wansu mountain range in the Andes of Peru, about 5,100 metres (16,732 ft) high. It is situated in the Arequipa Region, La Unión Province, Puyca District. Wayta Urqu lies north of Chhijmuni.
