= Condori (Condesuyos) =

Mountain in Peru

- Location within Peru

Highest point
- Elevation: 5,208 m (17,087 ft)
- Coordinates: 15°1′4″S 72°28′21″W

Geography
- Location: Peru, Arequipa Region, Condesuyos Province, La Unión Province
- Parent range: Andes, Huanzo

Condori (possibly from Aymara for condor) is a mountain in the Huanzo mountain range in the Andes of Peru, about 5,208-metre (17,087 ft) high. It is situated in the Arequipa Region, Condesuyos Province, Cayarani District, and in the La Unión Province, Puyca District, northeast of the mountain Atunpata. Condori lies south of the river Ojoruro (possibly from Aymara and Quechua for Mimulus glabratus), also known as Sumana or Cotahuasi, which flows to the Cotahuasi Canyon in the southwest.
