= Cotahuasi =

Coordinates: 15°12′47″S 72°53′18″W

- Village
- Interactive map of Cotahuasi
- Country: Peru
- Region: Arequipa
- Province: La Unión
- District: Cotahuasi

Government
  - Mayor: Justo Pastor Totocayo Garate
- Elevation: 2,683 m (8,802 ft)
- Time zone: UTC-5 (PET)

Cotahuasi is a town in Southern Peru, capital of the province La Unión in the region of Arequipa.
