= Cotahuasi Subbasin Landscape Reserve =

Protected area in Peru

- Reserva Paisajística Sub Cuenca del Cotahuasi
- IUCN category V (protected landscape/seascape)
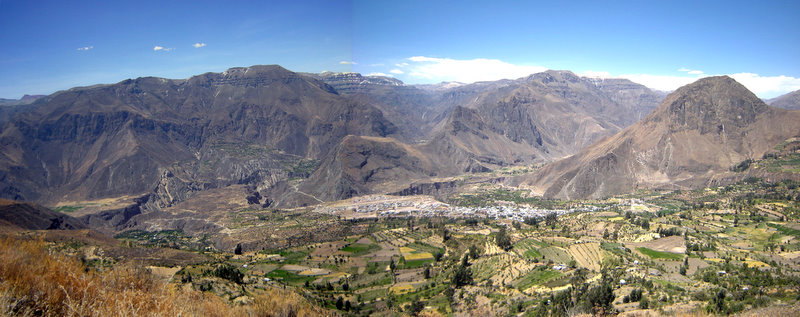
- Cotahuasi Canyon

- Location within Peru
- Location: Arequipa Region, La Unión Province, Peru
- Coordinates: 15.051°S 72.92°W
- Area: 4,905.5 km^{2} (1,894.0 mi^{2})
- Established: May 18, 2005

The Cotahuasi Subbasin Landscape Reserve (Spanish: Reserva Paisajística Sub Cuenca del Cotahuasi) is a protected area in Peru located in the Arequipa Region, La Unión Province. It protects part of the Central Andean puna and Sechura Desert ecoregions.

== See also ==
- Cotahuasi Canyon
- Mawk'allaqta
- Natural and Cultural Peruvian Heritage
