= Pillune (La Unión) =

Mountain in Peru

- Location within Peru

Highest point
- Elevation: 5,000 m (16,000 ft)
- Coordinates: 14°57′33″S 72°25′40″W

Naming
- Language of name: Aymara

Geography
- Location: Peru, Arequipa Region, La Unión Province
- Parent range: Andes, Huanzo

Pillune (possibly from Aymara pillu crown or cord which some indigenous peoples use to tighten their hair, -ni a suffix to indicate ownership, "the one with a crown" or "the one with a pillu") is a mountain in the Huanzo mountain range in the Andes of Peru, about 5,000 metres (16,404 ft) high. It is situated in the Arequipa Region, La Unión Province, Puyca District. Pillune lies west of Ancojahua, northwest of Quelcata and northeast of Chuañuma.
