= Yuraq Rumi =

Mountain in Peru

- Location within Peru

Highest point
- Elevation: 5,000 m (16,000 ft)
- Coordinates: 14°44′17″S 72°34′42″W

Geography
- Location: Peru, Arequipa Region, La Unión Province
- Parent range: Andes, Wansu

Yuraq Rumi (Quechuan yuraq white, rumi stone, "white stone", Hispanicized spelling Yuracrumi) is a mountain in the Wansu mountain range in the Andes of Peru, about 5,000 metres (16,404 ft) high. It is situated in the Arequipa Region, La Unión Province, Puyca District. Yuraq Rumi lies southeast of Q'illu Urqu.
