= Huanzo mountain range =

Peruvian part of the Andean Mountains

- Location within Peru Location within South America

Highest point
- Peak: Waych'awi (Hatun Waych'awi)
- Elevation: 5,445 m (17,864 ft)

Dimensions
- Length: 57 km (35 mi)

Geography
- Country: Peru
- Region(s): Apurímac Region, Arequipa Region, Ayacucho Region, Cusco Region
- Range coordinates: 15°S 73°W
- Parent range: Andes

The Huanzo mountain range (possibly from in the Quechua spelling Wansu) lies in the Andes of Peru. It extends between 14°30 and 15°01'S and 72°10 and 73°15W for about 57 km. It is situated in the Apurímac Region, Antabamba Province, in the Arequipa Region, Castilla Province, La Unión Province, in the Ayacucho Region, Parinacochas Province, and in the Chumbivilcas Province of the Cusco Region.

== Mountains ==
The highest mountain in the range is Waych'awi (Hatun Waych'awi) at 5,445 metres (17,864 ft). Other mountains are listed below:

- Waytani, 5,430 metres (17,815 ft)
- Waqrawiri, 5,425 metres (17,799 ft)
- Waña, 5,400 metres (17,717 ft)
- Allqa Walusa, 5,334 metres (17,500 ft)
- Chankuwaña, 5,331 metres (17,490 ft)
- Yana Yana, 5,321 metres (17,457 ft)
- Wachu Willka, 5,315 metres (17,438 ft)
- Qullpa K'uchu, 5,300 metres (17,388 ft)
- Wamanripa, 5,300 metres (17,388 ft)
- Wayunka, 5,300 metres (17,388 ft)
- Willkarana, 5,300 metres (17,388 ft)
- Ikma, 5,291 metres (17,359 ft)
- Wiska Waqi, 5,291 metres (17,359 ft)
- Aqu Suntu, 5,243 metres (17,201 ft)
- Tintaya, 5,230 metres (17,159 ft)
- Lunq'u, 5,224 metres (17,139 ft)
- Kunturi, 5,208 metres (17,087 ft)
- Chawpi Chawpi, 5,200 metres (17,060 ft)
- Janq'u Q'awa, 5,200 metres (17,060 ft)
- Hatunqullpa, 5,200 metres (17,060 ft)
- Kuntur K'uchu, 5,200 metres (17,060 ft)
- Kunturi, 5,200 metres (17,060 ft)
- Minasniyuq, 5,200 metres (17,060 ft)
- Pichaqani, 5,200 metres (17,060 ft)
- Puka Suntu, 5,200 metres (17,060 ft)
- Salli, 5,200 metres (17,060 ft)
- Surimana, 5,200 metres (17,060 ft)
- Wiska Tunqu, 5,200 metres (17,060 ft)
- Sara Sara, 5,195 metres (17,044 ft)
- Kisu Qutu, 5,177 metres (16,985 ft)
- P'umpu Q'asa, 5,169 metres (16,959 ft)
- Huch'uy Sara Sara, 5,131 metres (16,834 ft)
- Llulluch'a, 5,102 metres (16,739 ft)
- Inti Utka, 5,100 metres (16,732 ft)
- Jalanta, 5,100 metres (16,732 ft)
- Millu, 5,100 metres (16,732 ft)
- Mina Q'asa, 5,100 metres (16,732 ft)
- Kunturillu, 5,100 metres (16,732 ft)
- Puka Puka, 5,100 metres (16,732 ft)
- Qullpa, 5,100 metres (16,732 ft)
- Sullu Sullu, 5,100 metres (16,732 ft)
- Wayta Urqu, 5,100 metres (16,732 ft)
- Wila Quta, 5,100 metres (16,732 ft)
- Yuraq Punta, 5,100 metres (16,732 ft)
- Aqu Q'asa, 5,091 metres (16,703 ft)
- Kimsa Chata, 5,091 metres (16,703 ft)
- Aqu Suntu, 5,081 metres (16,670 ft)
- Chhijmuni, 5,080 metres (16,667 ft)
- Urpi Marka, 5,068 metres (16,627 ft)
- Q'illu Urqu, 5,038 metres (16,529 ft)
- Hatun Sisiwa, 5,003 metres (16,414 ft)
- Yana Ranra, 5,002 metres (16,411 ft)
- Anka Phawa, 5,000 metres (16,404 ft)
- Anka Phawa (Puyca), 5,000 metres (16,404 ft)
- Anqasi, 5,000 metres (16,404 ft)
- Chaka Urqu, 5,000 metres (16,404 ft)
- Challwa Q'asa, 5,000 metres (16,404 ft)
- Chunta Pata, 5,000 metres (16,404 ft)
- Chuqllu Chuqllu, 5,000 metres (16,404 ft)
- Ch'uwañuma, 5,000 metres (16,404 ft)
- Ch'iyara Ch'iyara, 5,000 metres (16,404 ft)
- Hatun Pata, 5,000 metres (16,404 ft)
- Kimsa Qaqa, 5,000 metres (16,404 ft)
- Kinra, 5,000 metres (16,404 ft)
- Kunturi, 5,000 metres (16,404 ft)
- Khirki Urqu, 5,000 metres (16,404 ft)
- Khuchi Pata, 5,000 metres (16,404 ft)
- Llimphiq, 5,000 metres (16,404 ft)
- Lluqu Chuyma, 5,000 metres (16,404 ft)
- Muntirayuq, 5,000 metres (16,404 ft)
- Panti Pata, 5,000 metres (16,404 ft)
- Paychi (Anta.-Esp.), 5,000 metres (16,404 ft)
- Paychi (Anta.), 5,000 metres (16,404 ft)
- Pilluni, 5,000 metres (16,404 ft)
- Pirqa, 5,000 metres (16,404 ft)
- Pirqasqa, 5,000 metres (16,404 ft)
- Pisti Q'asa, 5,000 metres (16,404 ft)
- Pukara, 5,000 metres (16,404 ft)
- Puka Ranra, 5,000 metres (16,404 ft)
- Puka Ranra (Arequ.), 5,000 metres (16,404 ft)
- Qarwa K'uchu, 5,000 metres (16,404 ft)
- Qarwa Urqu, 5,000 metres (16,404 ft)
- Qillqa, 5,000 metres (16,404 ft)
- Qillqata, 5,000 metres (16,404 ft)
- Quncha Urqu, 5,000 metres (16,404 ft)
- Quri Pawkara, 5,000 metres (16,404 ft)
- Quri Waraqa, 5,000 metres (16,404 ft)
- Q'illu, 5,000 metres (16,404 ft)
- Q'illu Pachaka, 5,000 metres (16,404 ft)
- Rumi Urqu, 5,000 metres (16,404 ft)
- Runtu Quri, 5,000 metres (16,404 ft)
- Saxa Q'awa, 5,000 metres (16,404 ft)
- Sullu Marka, 5,000 metres (16,404 ft)
- Surimana, 5,000 metres (16,404 ft)
- Taypi Q'awa, 5,000 metres (16,404 ft)
- Thujsa, 5,000 metres (16,404 ft)
- T'alla Kallanka, 5,000 metres (16,404 ft)
- Uturunku, 5,000 metres (16,404 ft)
- Waman Ch'arpa, 5,000 metres (16,404 ft)
- Wank'ayuq Saywa, 5,000 metres (16,404 ft)
- Waqrawiri, 5,000 metres (16,404 ft)
- Wayrawiri, 5,000 metres (16,404 ft)
- Yana Urqu, 5,000 metres (16,404 ft)
- Yawriwiri, 5,000 metres (16,404 ft)
- Yuraq Apachita, 5,000 metres (16,404 ft)
- Yuraq Kancha, 5,000 metres (16,404 ft)
- Yuraq Rumi, 5,000 metres (16,404 ft)
- Puka Urqu, 4,950 metres (16,240 ft)
- Sisiwa, 4,949 metres (16,237 ft)
- Saywa Punta, 4,900 metres (16,076 ft)
- Allqa Q'awa, 4,800 metres (15,748 ft)
- Challwa Q'asa, 4,800 metres (15,748 ft)
- Chullumpi, 4,800 metres (15,748 ft)
- Hatun Q'asa, 4,800 metres (15,748 ft)
- Inka Urqu, 4,800 metres (15,748 ft)
- Kuntur Wasi, 4,800 metres (15,748 ft)
- Misa Urqu, 4,800 metres (15,748 ft)
- Pachak Pata, 4,800 metres (15,748 ft)
- Puka Urqu, 4,800 metres (15,748 ft)
- Puma Ranra, 4,800 metres (15,748 ft)
- Phiruru, 4,800 metres (15,748 ft)
- Q'illu Wachu, 4,800 metres (15,748 ft)
- Uqi Saywa, 4,800 metres (15,748 ft)
- Utkhu, 4,800 metres (15,748 ft)
- Yana Uqhu, 4,800 metres (15,748 ft)
- Yuraq Urqu, 4,800 metres (15,748 ft)
- Yuraq Wasina, 4,800 metres (15,748 ft)

== Lakes ==
One of the largest lake in the range is Lake Ecma.
