= Q'illu Urqu (Apurímac-Arequipa) =

Mountain in Peru

- Location within Peru

Highest point
- Elevation: 5,038 m (16,529 ft)
- Coordinates: 14°42′20″S 72°35′11″W

Geography
- Location: Peru, Arequipa Region, Arequipa Region
- Parent range: Andes, Wansu

Q'illu Urqu (Quechua q'illu yellow, urqu mountain, "yellow mountain", Hispanicized spellings Jello Orjo, Quillo) is a 5,038-metre-high (16,529 ft) mountain in the Wansu mountain range in the Andes of Peru. It is situated in the Apurímac Region, Antabamba Province, Oropesa District, and in the Arequipa Region, La Unión Province, on the border of the districts of Huaynacotas and Puyca District. Q'illu Urqu lies southeast of the mountains Wilaquta, Allqa Walusa and Taruja Marka.
