= Alcabalusa (Arequipa) =

Mountain in Peru

Allqa Walusa
- Location within Peru

Highest point
- Elevation: 5,224 m (17,139 ft)
- Coordinates: 14°40′28″S 72°37′42″W

Geography
- Location: Peru, Apurímac Region, Arequipa Region
- Parent range: Andes, Wansu

Alcabalusa, Allqa Walusa or Allqawalusa (Aymara and Quechua allqa multicolored, black and white or two-colored, walusa, wallusa a watery kind of potatoes, Hispanicized spelling Alcabalusa) is a mountain in the Wansu mountain range in the Andes of Peru, about 5,224 metres (17,139 ft) high. It is situated in the Apurímac Region, Antabamba Province, Oropesa District, and in the Arequipa Region, La Unión Province, Huaynacotas District.

== See also ==
- Lunq'u
- Llamuqa
