= Minasniyuq (Arequipa-Cusco) =

Mountain in Peru

- Location within Peru

Highest point
- Elevation: 5,200 m (17,100 ft)
- Coordinates: 14°47′53″S 72°26′3″W

Geography
- Location: Peru, Arequipa Region, La Unión Province, Cusco Region, Chumbivilcas Province
- Parent range: Andes, Wansu

Minasniyuq (Spanish minas mines, Quechua -ni, -yuq suffixes, "the one with mines", Hispanicized spelling Minasniyoc) is a mountain in the Wansu mountain range in the Andes of Peru, about 5,200 metres (17,060 ft) high. It is situated in the Arequipa Region, La Unión Province, Puyca District, and in the Cusco Region, Chumbivilcas Province, Santo Tomás District. It lies northwest of the mountain Qullpa K'uchu.

The river Qañawimayu originates between the mountains Minasniyuq and Qullpa K'uchu at a height of 4,940 metres (16,207 ft). It is an important tributary of the Apurímac River, the source of the Amazon River.

== See also ==
- Kunturillu
