= Qullpa K'uchu =

Mountain in Peru

- Location within Peru

Highest point
- Elevation: 5,300 m (17,400 ft)
- Coordinates: 14°47′48″S 72°24′43″W

Geography
- Location: Peru, Arequipa Region, La Unión Province, Cusco Region, Chumbivilcas Province
- Parent range: Andes, Wansu

Qullpa K'uchu or Qullpak'uchu (Quechua qullpa salpeter, k'uchu corner "salpeter corner", Hispanicized spelling Cullpacucho) is a mountain in the Wansu mountain range in the Andes of Peru, about 5,300 metres (17,388 ft) high. It is situated in the Arequipa Region, La Unión Province, Puyca District, and in the Cusco Region, Chumbivilcas Province, Santo Tomás District, and in the La Unión Province, Puyca District. It lies east of the mountain Minasniyuq.

The river Qañawimayu originates between the mountains Minasniyuq and Qullpa K'uchu at a height of 4,940 metres (16,207 ft). It is an important tributary of the Apurímac River, the source of the Amazon River.

== See also ==
- Kunturillu
