= Lake Ecma =

Lake in Peru

- Location within Peru
- Location: Peru; Arequipa Region
- Coordinates: 14°53′32″S 72°31′25″W
- Surface elevation: 5,034 m (16,516 ft)

Lake Ecma or Lake Igma (possibly from Quechua ikma widow, qucha lake) is a lake in the Wansu mountain range in Peru. It lies in the Arequipa Region, La Unión Province, Puyca District. It is situated at a height of 5,034 metres (16,516 ft) at the foot of Huachuhuilca.
