= Cotahuasi Canyon =

Canyon in Peru

Coordinates: 15°16′S 73°02′W

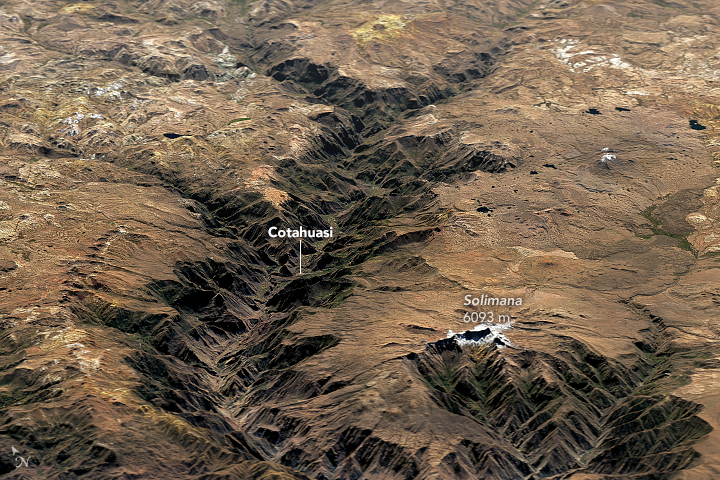
Cotahuasi Canyon, oblique Landsat 8 image draped over topographic data

Cotahuasi Canyon (from Quechua Kutawasi), near the city of Arequipa in Peru, is one of the deepest canyons in the world. With a depth of approximately 3,354 metres (11,004 ft), as defined as the difference in elevation at river level and the peak of a mountain alongside the canyon, it is more than twice as deep as the Grand Canyon. The Cotahuasi River eroded the canyon between two mountain massifs: the Coropuna (6,425 m or 21,079 ft ASL) and the Solimana (6,093 m or 19,990 ft ASL). It extends from spurs of the snow-covered Solimana to the confluence with the Ocoña River near the village of Chaucalla.

The Cotahuasi River's source is Lake Wansuqucha, at more than 4,750 m (15,580 ft) above sea level. It receives the tributaries of the Wayllapaña River in the neighborhood of Pampamarka, to the north, and the Huarcaya near Tumipampa, to the west, and is later joined by the Maran River to form the Ocoña River, which ends at the Pacific Ocean.

== Location ==
Cotahuasi is located at the highest Andean point of Arequipa, in the south of Peru : UTM 683,370 & 790,415 East & 8’275,582 & 8’380,125 North. Between 14°40´22" & 15°35´27" south latitude, 72°19´15" & 73°18´08" west longitude.

This province is characterized by its steep relief: incised by rivers and gullies, ranging between 1,000 and 6,093 metres, with 19 ecological zones. As is the case with cultures all over the world, the people of highland Arequipa Province are also changing with the times. Nonetheless, the altitude and remoteness of this region mean that residents have retained many of the practices that are now no longer common in neighboring regions.

== Access ==
The only road leading to the canyon goes through Chuquibamba in the Condesuyos province, then Aplao in Castilla Province. It begins on the Panamerican Highway near Arequipa. Four bus companies start daily from the Arequipa bus terminal, between 4 and 6 pm. The bus drive is 10–12 hours long, on a road which is unpaved after Chuquibamba. It also goes quite high, through a 4500m pass between Coropuna and Solimana.

== Protected area ==
The Cotahuasi Subbasin is a landscape park set up by a 2005 decree. It covers 4,905.5 km^{2} (1,894.0 sq mi). This natural reserve preserves an integrated environment where man and nature are living in close harmony, in a preserved cultural microcosm. The difficult topographic conditions have generated specific landscapes like agricultural terraces.

== Agriculture ==
Organic agriculture includes many plants in the reserve : kiwicha, quinoa, mint, dark maize, llacon, fava, oca, beans, arveja (pea), chulpi maize, anise, tarwi. These products are meant to give priority to food supplies to the province. Therefore, very little is produced for export. Food autonomy is reached thanks to ecological techniques, rational use of water, promotion of improved seeds, conservation of biodiversity, strengthening of producer associations, and complementary livestock breeding.

== Tourism ==
The Cotahuasi landscape reserve is a preserved area. The landscapes have a large biodiversity including many endemic medicinal plants : muña, retama, tara, coca, jara (malva sylvestris), ruda (ruta graveolens), kiwicha, yareta (azorella compacta).

The landscapes are quite many, from the rivers at the bottom of the canyon to the cold desert areas of the summits. There are 12 different ecosystems in Cotahuasi reserve. There are also a number of Inca and pre-Inca works including the many agricultural terraces still in use today. The region is also rich with culture and traditions, preserved by ancient Andean people : weaving, colonial churches, Inca tracks, numerous festivals.

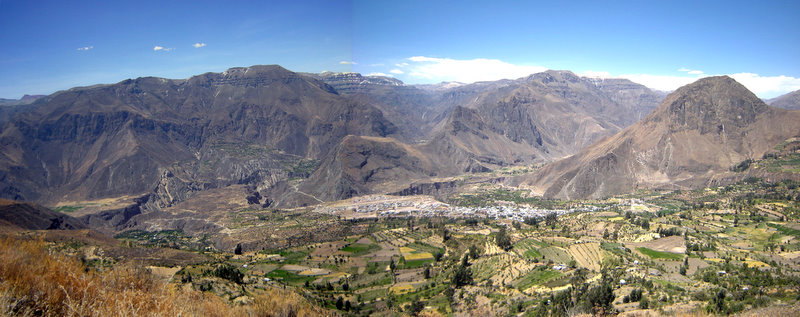

== See also ==
- Colca Canyon
- Cotahuasi Subbasin Landscape Reserve
- Natural and Cultural Peruvian Heritage
- Wiñaw
