= Department of Arequipa =

Department of Peru

Arequipa Ariqipa (Aymara and Quechua)
- Department
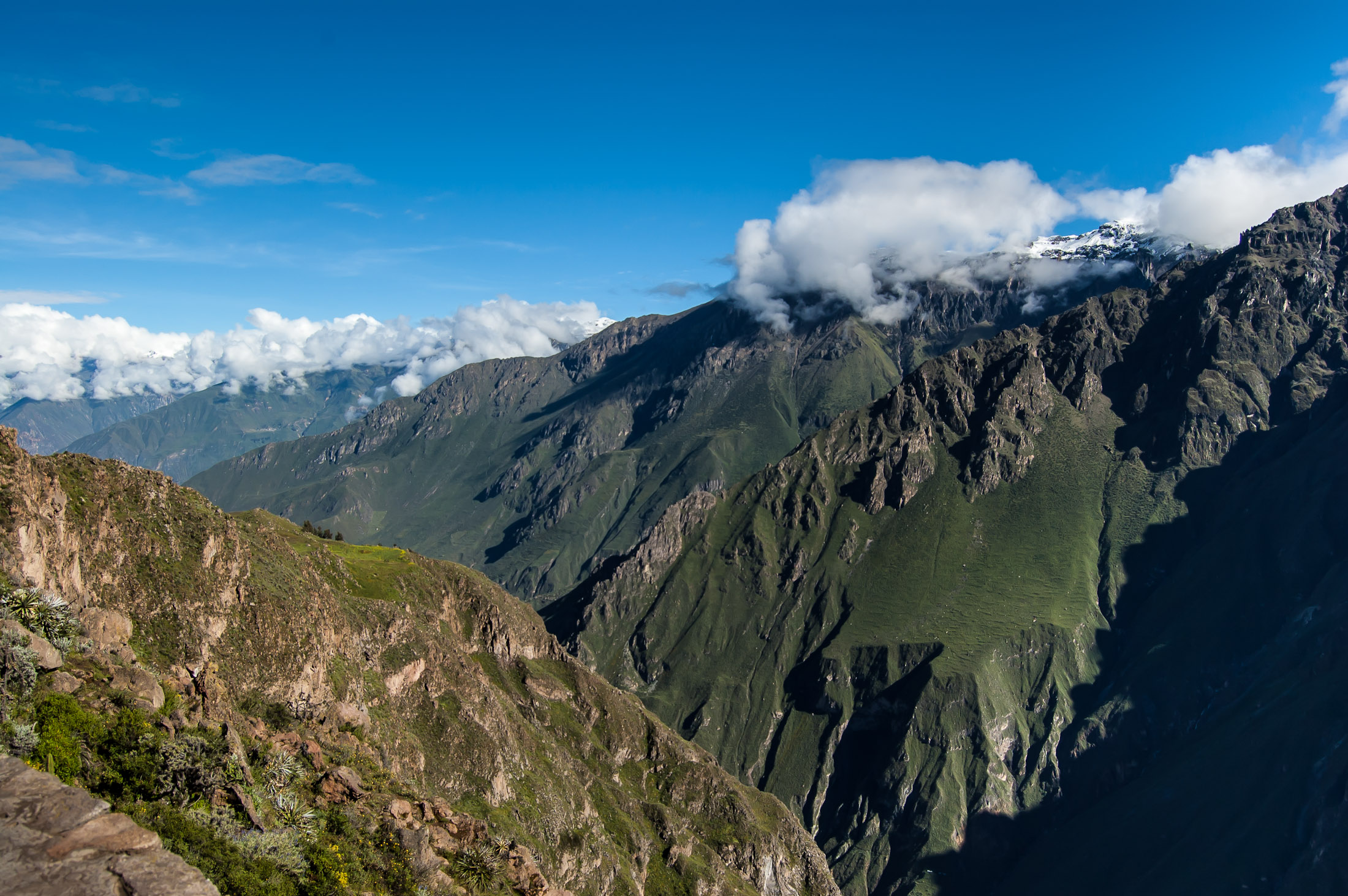
- The Colca Canyon

- Flag Coat of arms

- Location of Arequipa within Peru
- Coordinates: 15.86°S 72.25°W
- Country: Peru
- Established: April 26, 1822
- Capital: Arequipa
- Provinces: List: Arequipa; Camaná; Caravelí; Castilla; Caylloma; Condesuyos; Islay; La Unión

Government
  - Type: Regional Government
  - Governor: Rohel Sánchez Sánchez

Area
  - Total: 63,345.39 km^{2} (24,457.79 sq mi)
- Highest elevation: 6,305 m (20,686 ft)
- Lowest elevation: 0 m (0 ft)

Population (2025 census)
  - Total: 1,814,396
  - Density: 28.64291/km^{2} (74.18478/sq mi)
- Demonym: arequipeño/a
- UBIGEO: 04
- Dialing code: 054
- ISO 3166 code: PE-ARE
- Principal resources: Wheat, cotton, rice, onion, garlic, cooper seed fruits, milk.
- Poverty rate: 13.9% (INEI)
- Percentage of Peru's GDP: 5.64%
- Website: www.regionarequipa.gob.pe

Arequipa (Quechua: Ariqipa) is a department of Peru. Located to the country's southwest, it is the sixth largest department in Peru, after Puno, Cuzco, Madre de Dios, Ucayali, and Loreto, its sixth most populous department, and its eleventh least densely populated department. It is bordered by the departments of Ica, Ayacucho, Apurímac and Cuzco to the north, Puno to the east, the Department of Moquegua to the south, and the Pacific Ocean to the west. It is administered by a regional government. Its capital, also called Arequipa, is Peru's second-largest city.

== History ==
The department was created by the Reglamento Provisional de Elecciones, published on April 26, 1822, which established the department of Arequipa alongside those of Cuzco, Huamanga, Huancavelica and Puno. Prior to this establishment, it had been part of the Intendancy of Arequipa, an administrative division of the Viceroyalty of Peru.

Following the civil war of 1856–1858, due to the department having served as a starting point for the rebellion against the government at the time, then president Ramón Castilla downgraded Arequipa to a province through two decrees expedited on March 12 and 14, 1858. On May 13 of the same year, however, he made a request to the Council of Ministers that the department, its prefecture, superior court and administrative offices, be reestablished.

In 1980, the Peruvian Air Force responded to a UFO incident over Arequipa.

== Geography ==
This department has a rough topography, which is characterised by heavy layers of volcanic lava covering large areas of its inter-Andean sector. It has deep canyons such as the ones formed by the Ocoña and Majes rivers. Plateaus range in height from medium, such as La Joya, and high-altitude ones such the Arrieros Pampa and those located in the zones of Chivay, Huambo and Pichucolla. Volcanic cones, such as Misti, Chachani, Ampato, Mismi, Solimana and Coropuna, emerge above the plateaus and attract snowfall. In contrast with these heights, there are deep canyons, including Majes, Colca, Sihuas and Ocoña, where important aspects of the ecological evolution of this zone can be clearly observed.

Along the coast, small plateaus and dunes represent characteristics of the desert of Arequipa, such as the ones located in the Majes, Sihuas and La Joya plains. These are particularly beautiful and developed.

From a hydrographic point of view, the rivers draining its territory belong mainly to the Pacific watershed. Some rivers belong to the Amazon hydrographic system. Some of the region's main rivers are: Ocoña, Yauca, Camaná and Quilca. The starting point of the Amazon River is located in the Arequipa region.

The highest mountains of Arequipa are:

1. Coropuna 6,425 mamsl, Ampato Range.
2. Ampato 6,288 mamsl, Ampato Range.
3. Solimana 6,093 mamsl, Ampato Range.
4. Chachani 6,057 mamsl, Volcanic Range.
5. Hualca Hualca 6,025 mamsl, Ampato Range.
6. Sabancaya 5,976 mamsl, Ampato Range.
7. Misti 5,822 mamsl, Volcanic Range.
8. Nocarane 5,784 mamsl, Volcanic Range.
9. Pichu Pichu 5,664 mamsl, Volcanic Range.
10. Chila 5,654 mamsl, Chila Range.
11. Casiri 5,647 mamsl, Chila Range.
12. Mismi 5,597 mamsl, Chila Range.
13. Minaspata 5,555 mamsl, Chila Range.
14. Quehuisha 5,514 mamsl, Chila Range.
15. Surihuiri 5,506 mamsl, Chila Range.
16. Tacune 5,500 mamsl, Volcanic Range.
17. Firura 5,498 mamsl, Ampato Range.
18. Yuraccasa 5,465 mamsl, Chila Range.
19. Jatunpila 5,450 mamsl, Chila Range.
20. Jatun Huaychahui 5,445 mamsl, Huanzo Range

== Political division ==
Map of provinces

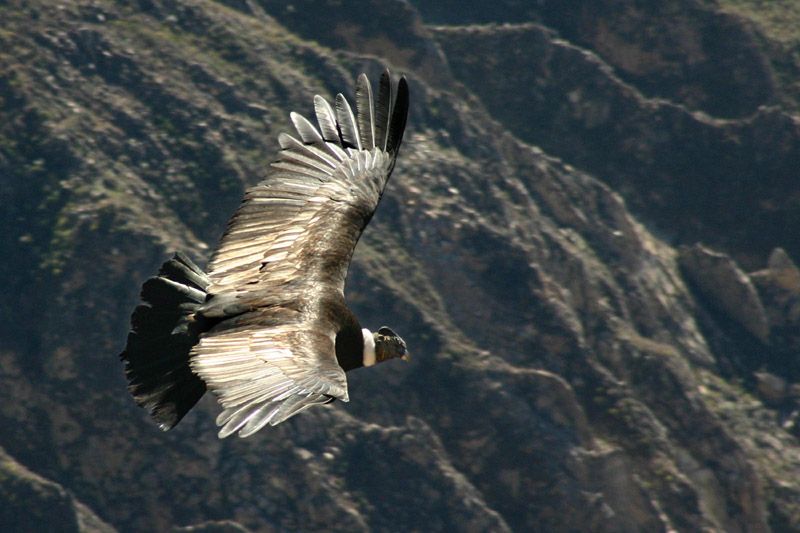
An Andean condor soars over the Colca Canyon.

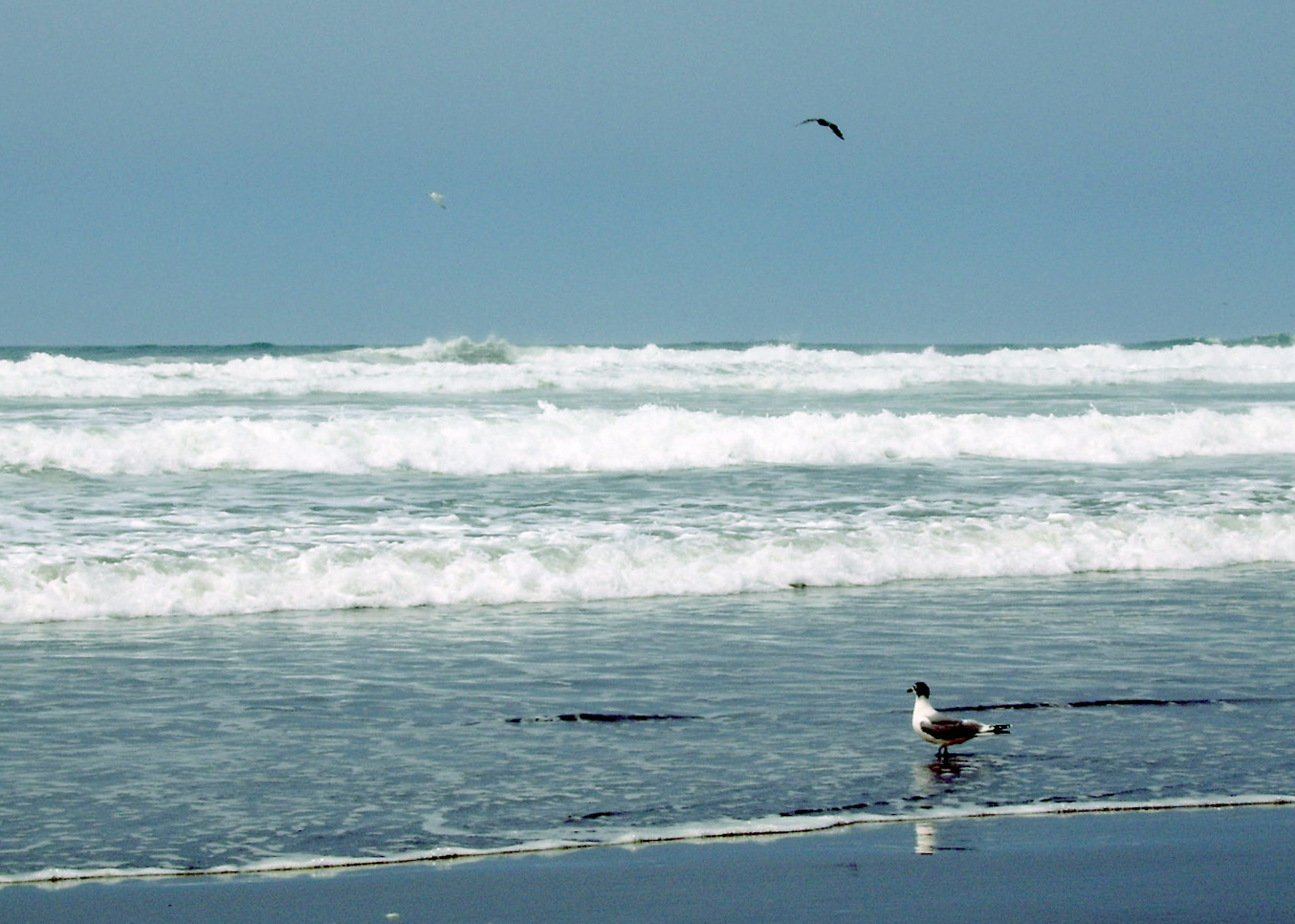
Beaches of La Punta de Bombon

The region is divided into eight provinces (provincias, singular: provincia), which are composed of 109 districts (distritos, singular: distrito). The provinces, with their capitals in parentheses, are:

1. Arequipa (Arequipa)
2. Camaná (Camaná)
3. Caravelí (Caravelí)
4. Castilla (Aplao)
5. Caylloma (Chivay)
6. Condesuyos (Chuquibamba)
7. Islay (Mollendo)
8. La Unión (Cotahuasi)

== Demographics ==
=== Population growth ===
Census year	Population
1981	738,482
1993	939,062
2007	1,147,602
2017	1,460,433
2025	1,814,396

=== Languages ===
According to the 2007 Peru Census, the first language learned by most of the residents was Spanish (83.17%), followed by the native language of Quechua (14.78%). The Quechua variety spoken in Arequipa is Cusco–Collao Quechua.

The following table shows the first languages by province in the Arequipa Region by province:

Province	Quechua	Aymara	Asháninka	Another native language	Spanish	Foreign language	Deaf or mute	Total
Arequipa	101,631	13,464	136	1,054	705,179	1,151	533	823,148
Camana	6,677	1,292	8	10	42,197	5	32	50,221
Caraveli	4,912	362	5	4	28,565	32	30	33,910
Castilla	6,700	545	6	31	28,840	7	49	36,178
Caylloma	23,281	1,142	10	109	44,656	21	51	69,270
Condesuyos	4,734	79	3	8	13,107	-	18	17,949
Islay	5,280	1,614	9	110	42,427	362	46	49,848
La Unión	8,676	40	4	31	5,873	11	25	14,660
Total	161,891	18,538	181	1,357	910,844	1,589	784	1,095,184
%	14.78	1.69	0.02	0.12	83.17	0.15	0.07	100.00

=== Ethnicity ===
Ethnicity in Arequipa (2017)
1. Mestizo (55.5%)
2. Quechua (32.3%)
3. White Peruvians (5.00%)
4. Aymara (3.30%)
5. Afro-Peruvian (2.20%)
6. Other (1.60%)

As of 2017, the largest ethnicity in the Arequipa region are the Mestizo, followed by the Quechua.

Ethnicity in Arequipa (2017)
Ethnicity	Percentage	Number
Mestizo	55.5%	639,082
Quechua	32.3%	372,378
White-Peruvian	5%	57,972
Aymara	3.3%	38,318
Afro-Peruvian	2.2%	25,744
Other	1.7%	18,495

=== Religion ===
In 2017, over 80% of Arequipa's population was Catholic.

Religion in Arequipa (2017)
Religion	Percentage	Number
Catholicism	83.3%	983,652
Evangelical	6.3%	74,582
Other	6.1%	72,330
Irreligious	4.3%	50,278

=== Literacy ===
In 2017, 91.5% (1,274,358) of the population was literate and 8.5% (118,691) of the population was illiterate.

== Points of interest ==
There are numerous points of interest in the Arequipa region. The three coastal provinces, Caraveli, Camana and Islay all have popular beaches. Various ports can also be found along the coastline, the two most important being Mollendo and Matarani, both in the province of Islay.

The Colca Canyon, twice as deep as the Grand Canyon in the United States, is situated in the province of Caylloma. The Cotahuasi Canyon is in the La Union Province. Colca Valley provides incredible close-up views of Andean condors soaring in their natural habitat. Cotahuasi, at 3,535 metres (11,598 ft), is thought to be the deepest canyon in the world.

In the Castilla Province near Corire, Toro Muerto (meaning "dead bull" in Spanish) is an area with more than 3,000 ancient petroglyphs dating to the ancient Wari culture of 500–1000 CE, which dominated much of this region. Further to the north near Andaguas lies the Valley of Volcanoes. Almost 100 cones of various sizes dominate the lava-hardened landscape.

== See also ==
- 2001 southern Peru earthquake
- Cotahuasi Subbasin Landscape Reserve
