= Qullqini =

Mountain in Peru

- Location within Peru

Highest point
- Elevation: 5,025 m (16,486 ft)
- Coordinates: 14°23′42″S 71°03′42″W

Geography
- Location: Peru, Cusco Region, Canchis Province
- Parent range: Andes, La Raya

Qullqini (Aymara qullqi silver, -ni a suffix to indicate ownership, "the one with silver", Hispanicized spelling Colquene) is a 5,025-metre-high (16,486 ft) mountain in the La Raya mountain range in the Andes of Peru. It is located in the Cusco Region, Canchis Province, Marangani District. Qullqini lies near the La Raya pass southwest of Qillqa and Kuntur Quta and northwest of Huch'uy K'uchu. It is situated at the Qillqa valley whose stream flows to the Willkanuta River.
