= Yana Ranra =

Mountain in Peru

- Location within Peru

Highest point
- Elevation: 5,000 m (16,000 ft)
- Coordinates: 14°26′03″S 71°01′36″W

Geography
- Location: Peru, Cusco Region, Canas Province, Canchis Province
- Parent range: Andes, La Raya

Yana Ranra (Quechua yana black, ranra stony; stony ground, "black stony ground", also spelled Yanarangra) is a mountain in the La Raya mountain range in the Andes of Peru, about 5,000 metres (16,404 ft) high. It is located in the Cusco Region, Canas Province, Layo District, and the Canchis Province, Marangani District. Yana Ranra lies near the La Raya pass northwest of Chimpulla and Kunka and southwest of Huch'uy K'uchu. It is situated at the Hatun K'uchu valley ("big corner", Atuncucho) whose stream flows to the Willkanuta River.
