= Yanaqucha (Melgar) =

Mountain in Peru

- Location within Peru

Highest point
- Elevation: 5,105 m (16,749 ft)
- Coordinates: 14°27′22″S 70°54′07″W

Geography
- Location: Peru, Puno Region
- Parent range: Andes, La Raya

Yanaqucha (Quechua yana black, qucha lake, "black lake", Hispanicized spelling Yanacocha) is a 5,105-metre-high (16,749 ft) mountain in the La Raya mountain range in the Andes of Peru. It is situated in Santa Rosa District, Melgar Province, Puno Region. Yanaqucha lies near the La Raya pass northwest of Khunurana, Puka Urqu and Mamaniri and southeast of Chimpulla.
