= Layo =

Layo may refer to:

- Layo Paskin, British DJ in Layo & Bushwacka!, active 1988–present
- Roseline Layo (born 1993), Ivorian Gospel singer
- Layo District, a district of Canas Province, Peru
- Layo, Cusco, a village in Layo District, Peru
- Lake Langui Layo, a lake in Peru
