= José Velásquez =

José Velásquez or Velázquez may refer to:

- José Velásquez (explorer) (1717–1785), Spanish explorer
- José Velásquez (footballer, born 1952), Peruvian footballer
- José Velásquez (footballer, born 1998), Peruvian footballer
- José Velázquez de Medrano (1561–1622), Navarrese noble and artist
- José Antonio Velásquez (1906–1983), Honduran painter
- José David Velásquez (born 1989), Honduran footballer
- José Eduardo Velásquez Tarazona (1947–2026), Peruvian prelate of the Roman Catholic Church
- José Manuel Velázquez (born 1990), Venezuelan footballer
- José Miguel Velásquez (born 1967), Venezuelan-born composer, music producer and vocal coach
