= Yana Urqu (Canas-Canchis) =

Mountain in Peru

- Location within Peru

Highest point
- Elevation: 4,800 m (15,700 ft)
- Coordinates: 14°24′50″S 71°13′47″W

Geography
- Location: Peru, Cusco Region
- Parent range: Andes

Yana Urqu (Quechua yana black, urqu mountain, "black mountain", hispanicized spellings Yanaorcco, Yanaorco) is a mountain in the Andes of Peru, about 4,800-metre (15,700 ft) high. It is located in the Cusco Region, Canas Province, Langui District, and in the Canchis Province, Marangani District. Yana Urqu lies on a ridge northeast of Langui Layo Lake, northwest of Pawka.
