= Tupay Tuqtu =

Tupay Tuqtu (Quechua tupay to crash, to collide, tuqtu broody hen) is a festival held annually on February 2 at the mountain Tuqtu in the Cusco Region in Peru. On April 1, 2008, it was declared a National Cultural Heritage by Resolución Directoral Nacional No.466-INC. The event takes place in a plain named Winch'iri on the border of the districts Quehue of the Canas Province and Livitaca of the Chumbivilcas Province.

During the festival people of various communities of the two provinces meet to fight against each other. It is considered a ritual battle. This clash between communities is similar to the ritual battle of Ch'iyar Jaqhi which also takes place in the Canas Province.

== See also ==
- Takanakuy
- Warachikuy
