= Taruja Marka =

Mountain in Peru

- Location within Peru

Highest point
- Elevation: 5,000 m (16,000 ft)
- Coordinates: 14°24′57″S 70°55′16″W

Geography
- Location: Peru, Puno Region
- Parent range: Andes, La Raya

Taruja Marka (Aymara taruja deer, marka village, "deer village", Hispanicized spelling Tarucamarca) or Taruka Marka (Quechua spelling) is a mountain in the La Raya mountain range in the Andes of Peru, about 5,000 metres (16,404 ft) high. It is situated in the Puno Region, Melgar Province, on the border of the districts of Nuñoa and Santa Rosa. Taruja Marka lies near the La Raya pass, northwest of the mountain Yanaqucha and northeast of Chimpulla.
