= Ch'iyar Jaqhi (Cusco) =

Mountain in Peru

- Location within Peru

Highest point
- Elevation: 4,654 m (15,269 ft)
- Coordinates: 14°21′28″S 71°23′39″W

Geography
- Location: Peru, Cusco Region, Canas Province
- Parent range: Andes

Ch'iyar Jaqhi (Aymara ch'iyara black, jaqhi precipice, cliff, "black cliff", Hispanicized spelling Chiaraje) is a mountain the Andes of Peru, about 4,654 m (15,269 ft) high. It lies in the Cusco Region, Canas Province, on the border of the districts Langui, Quehue and Yanaoca.

Ch'iyar Jaqhi or Tupay (Quechua for to crash, to collide) is also the name of a festival which annually takes place at the mountain in the plain called Ch'iyar Jaqhi Pampa on January 20. During the festival, people of various communities meet to fight against each other. It is considered a ritual battle. This clash between communities is similar to the ritual battle of Tupay Tuqtu which also takes place in the Canas Province.

== See also ==
- Takanakuy
- Warachikuy
