= Chawpi Tiyana =

Mountain in Peru

- Location within Peru

Highest point
- Elevation: 5,000 m (16,000 ft)
- Coordinates: 14°22′45″S 71°03′01″W

Geography
- Location: Peru, Cusco Region
- Parent range: Andes, La Raya

Chawpi Tiyana (Quechua chawpi central, middle, tiyana seat, "central seat", hispanicized spelling Chaupitiana) is a mountain in the La Raya mountain range in the Andes of Peru, about 5,000 m (16,000 ft) high. It is located in the Cusco Region, Canchis Province, Marangani District. It lies southwest of Kuntur Quta and south of Wiyachayuq.
