= Wiluyu (Marangani) =

Mountain in Peru

- Location within Peru

Highest point
- Elevation: 5,000 m (16,000 ft)
- Coordinates: 14°25′51″S 71°09′36″W

Geography
- Location: Peru, Cusco Region
- Parent range: Andes

Wiluyu (Aymara wila blood, blood-red, uyu corral, "red corral", hispanicized spelling Viluyo) is a mountain in the Andes of Peru, about 5,000-metre (16,000 ft) high. It is located in the Cusco Region, Canchis Province, Marangani District. Wiluyu lies east of Langui Layo Lake, north of Pawka.
