= Suyt'uqucha (Melgar) =

Lake in Puno, Peru

- Location within Peru
- Location: Puno Region
- Coordinates: 14°32′31″S 70°57′22″W
- Basin countries: Peru
- Max. length: 1.02 km (0.63 mi)
- Max. width: 0.32 km (0.20 mi)
- Surface area: 0.7 km^{2} (0.27 sq mi)
- Surface elevation: 4,530 m (14,860 ft)

Suyt'uqucha (Quechua suyt'u, sayt'u rectangular, qucha lake, lagoon, "rectangular lake", Hispanicized spelling Suytococha) is a lake in Peru located in the Puno Region, Melgar Province, Santa Rosa District. It is situated at a height of about 4,530 metres (14,862 ft), about 1.02 km long and 0.32 km at its widest point. Suyt'uqucha lies west of Khunurana and south of the street and rails which go through the La Raya pass.

== See also ==
- Janq'uquta
- List of lakes in Peru
