= Laramani =

Mountain in Peru

- Location within Peru

Highest point
- Elevation: 4,922.8 m (16,151 ft)
- Coordinates: 14°36′35″S 71°11′25″W

Geography
- Location: Peru, Cusco Region, Canas Province
- Parent range: Andes

Laramani (Aymara larama blue, -ni a suffix to indicate ownership, "the one with blue color") is a mountain in the Andes of Peru, about 4,922.8 metres (16,151 ft) high. It is located in the Cusco Region, Canas Province, on the border of the districts Kunturkanki and Layo, and in the Espinar Province, Pichigua District. A stream named Pumanuta originates east of the mountain. It flows to the lake Langui Layo north of Laramani.
