= Santa Rosa District, Melgar =

Coordinates: 14.6114°S 70.9311°W

Santa Rosa District
- District
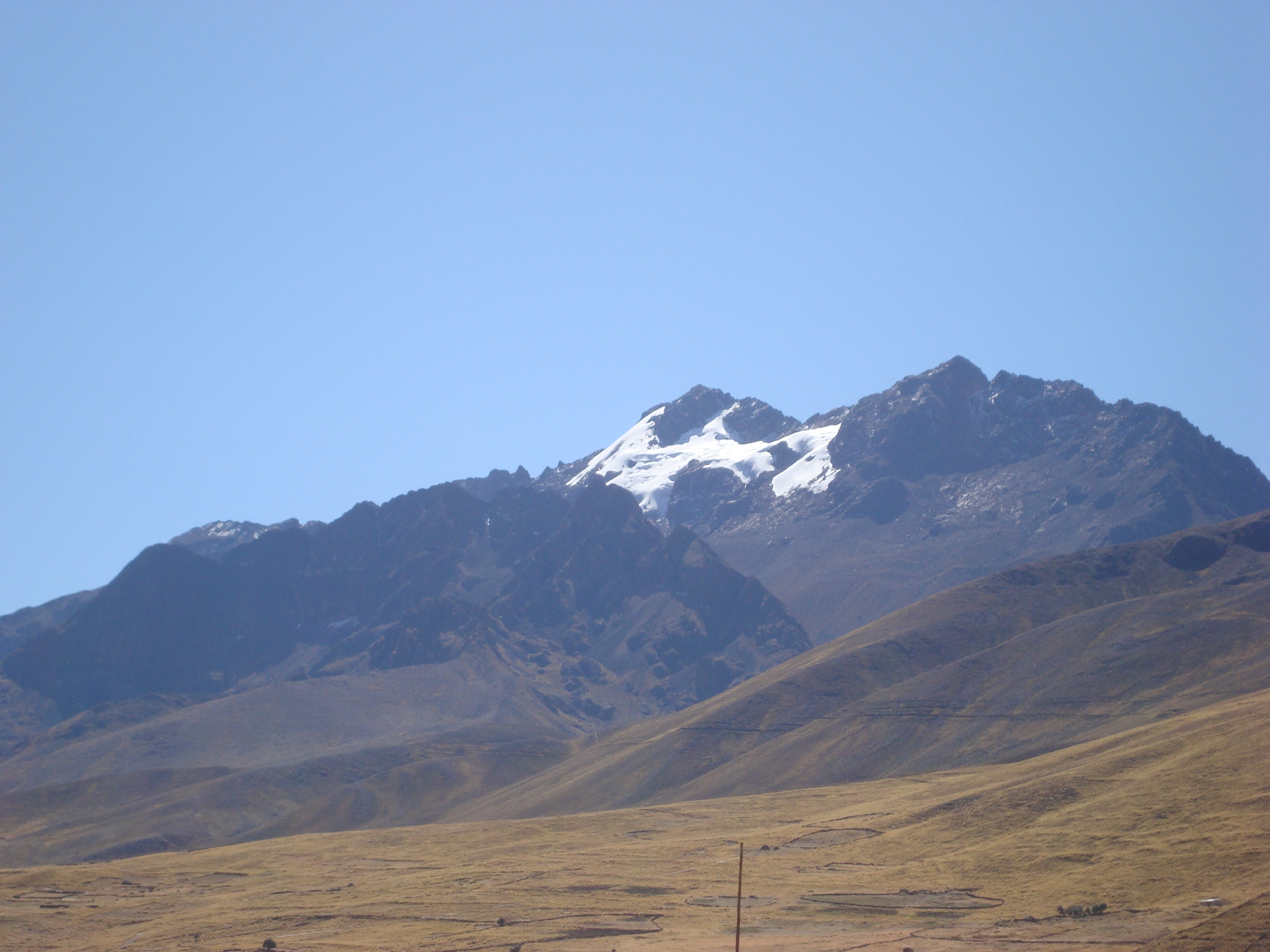
- Khunurana, Santa Rosa district
- Interactive map of Santa Rosa District
- Country: Peru
- Region: Puno
- Province: Melgar
- Capital: Santa Rosa

Government
  - Mayor: Filiberto Tacca Navarro

Area
  - Total: 790.38 km^{2} (305.17 sq mi)
- Elevation: 3,993 m (13,100 ft)

Population (2005 census)
  - Total: 7,454
  - Density: 9.431/km^{2} (24.43/sq mi)
- Time zone: UTC-5 (PET)
- UBIGEO: 210808

Santa Rosa District is one of nine districts of the province Melgar in Peru.

== Geography ==
The La Raya mountain range traverses the district. Some of the highest mountains are listed below:

- Chimpulla
- Hatun Ichhuna Kunka
- Inka Kancha
- Khunurana
- Kunka
- Mamaniri
- Puka Urqu
- Sapan Warmi
- Silluta
- Taruja Marka
- T'uqra
- Wilaquta
- Yana Khuchilla
- Yana Salla
- Yanaqucha
- Yaritani

== Ethnic groups ==
The people in the district are mainly indigenous citizens of Quechua descent. Quechua is the language which the majority of the population (78.58%) learnt to speak in childhood, 21.12% of the residents started speaking using the Spanish language (2007 Peru Census).

== Climate ==
Climate data for Santa Rosa, elevation 3,957 m (12,982 ft), (1991–2020)
Month	Jan	Feb	Mar	Apr	May	Jun	Jul	Aug	Sep	Oct	Nov	Dec	Year
Mean daily maximum °C (°F)	15.7 (60.3)	15.5 (59.9)	15.3 (59.5)	15.7 (60.3)	15.8 (60.4)	15.6 (60.1)	15.5 (59.9)	16.7 (62.1)	17.6 (63.7)	17.9 (64.2)	18.4 (65.1)	17.0 (62.6)	16.4 (61.5)
Mean daily minimum °C (°F)	4.8 (40.6)	5.1 (41.2)	4.5 (40.1)	2.2 (36.0)	−2.6 (27.3)	−6.5 (20.3)	−7.0 (19.4)	−5.0 (23.0)	−0.9 (30.4)	1.9 (35.4)	3.6 (38.5)	4.6 (40.3)	0.4 (32.7)
Average precipitation mm (inches)	165.2 (6.50)	132.9 (5.23)	126.1 (4.96)	40.9 (1.61)	7.5 (0.30)	3.2 (0.13)	2.4 (0.09)	6.9 (0.27)	21.4 (0.84)	61.3 (2.41)	72.6 (2.86)	128.3 (5.05)	768.7 (30.25)
Source: National Meteorology and Hydrology Service of Peru

== See also ==
- Suyt'uqucha
