= Yanaoca =

Yanaoca Yanawqa
- Town
- Location within Peru
- Coordinates: 14°13′00″S 71°25′52″W
- Country: Peru
- Region: Cusco
- Province: Canas
- District: Yanaoca
- Time zone: UTC-5 (PET)

Yanaoca is a town in southern Peru, capital of Canas Province in Cusco Region.
