= Guido Bellido =

Prime Minister of Peru in 2021

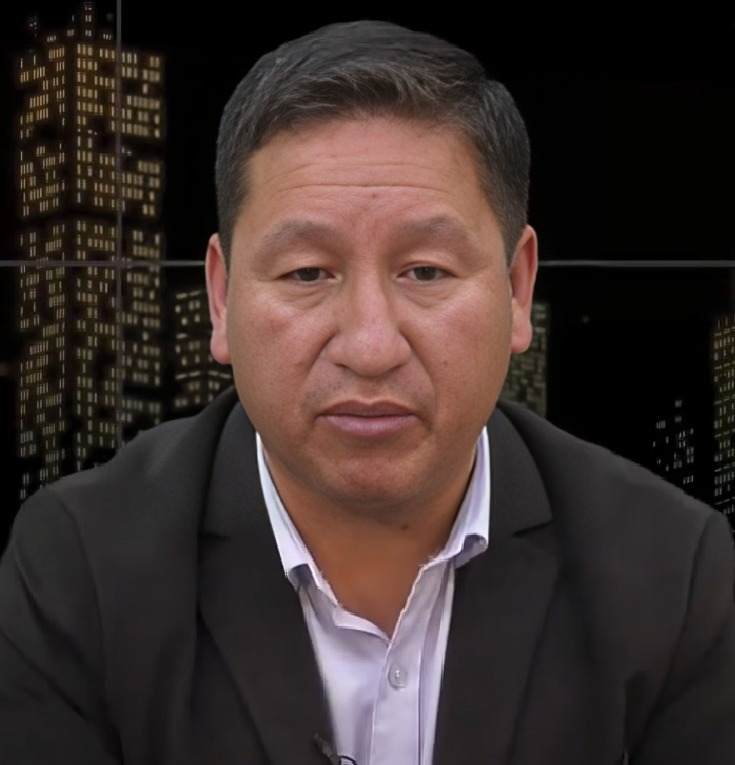
- Bellido in 2022

Member of Congress
- In office 27 July 2021 – 26 July 2026
- Constituency: Cusco

Prime Minister of Peru
- In office 29 July 2021 – 6 October 2021
- President: Pedro Castillo
- Preceded by: Violeta Bermúdez
- Succeeded by: Mirtha Vásquez

Personal details
- Born: Guido Bellido Ugarte; 7 August 1979 (age 47) Livitaca District, Peru
- Party: Conscience People (2024-present)
- Other political affiliations: Free Peru (2017–2022); Independent (2015–2017); Patria Arriba Peru Adelante (2014–2015)
- Education: National University of Saint Anthony the Abbot in Cuzco (BS)

Guido Bellido Ugarte (born 7 August 1979) is a Peruvian politician of Quechua heritage, an electrical engineer and economist. He served as prime minister of Peru from 29 July to 6 October 2021. He is also serving as a member of the Congress, representing Cuzco.

== Early life ==
Bellido Ugarte was born to a Quechua family in Livitaca on 7 August 1979. He has a bachelor's degree in electronic engineering and a master's degree in economics with a major in public management and regional development. He carried out his higher studies at the National University of Saint Anthony the Abbot in Cuzco.

== Political career ==
Until 2018, he was a member of the Arriba Peru Adelante party, where he served as a legal representative, and later joined the Free Peru party where he served as a regional secretary general in Cuzco. He was elected to the Congress of Peru at the 2021 general election as a member of Free Peru.

In May 2021, the Office of the Prosecutor Against Terrorism opened an investigation against Guido Bellido for the alleged crime of "apology to terrorism", following an interview where he spoke about the Shining Path : "The country was in a disastrous state in 1980. Some Peruvians took the wrong path. Are they Peruvians or not? They have rights. What do you have against the members of the Shining Path?" he had said in an interview with an online media".

In August 2021, the First Supranational Corporate Prosecutor's Office Specialized in Money Laundering Crimes initiated an investigation for the alleged crime of money laundering against the ruling party, Peru Libre, and nineteen of its members, including Minister Bellido. It was started as part of the investigation process for the Dinámicos del Centro case that was initiated in Junín. The causes of the investigation, according to the specialized Prosecutor's Office, are linked to the sudden increase in assets of Perú Libre since 2020.

=== Prime Minister of Peru ===
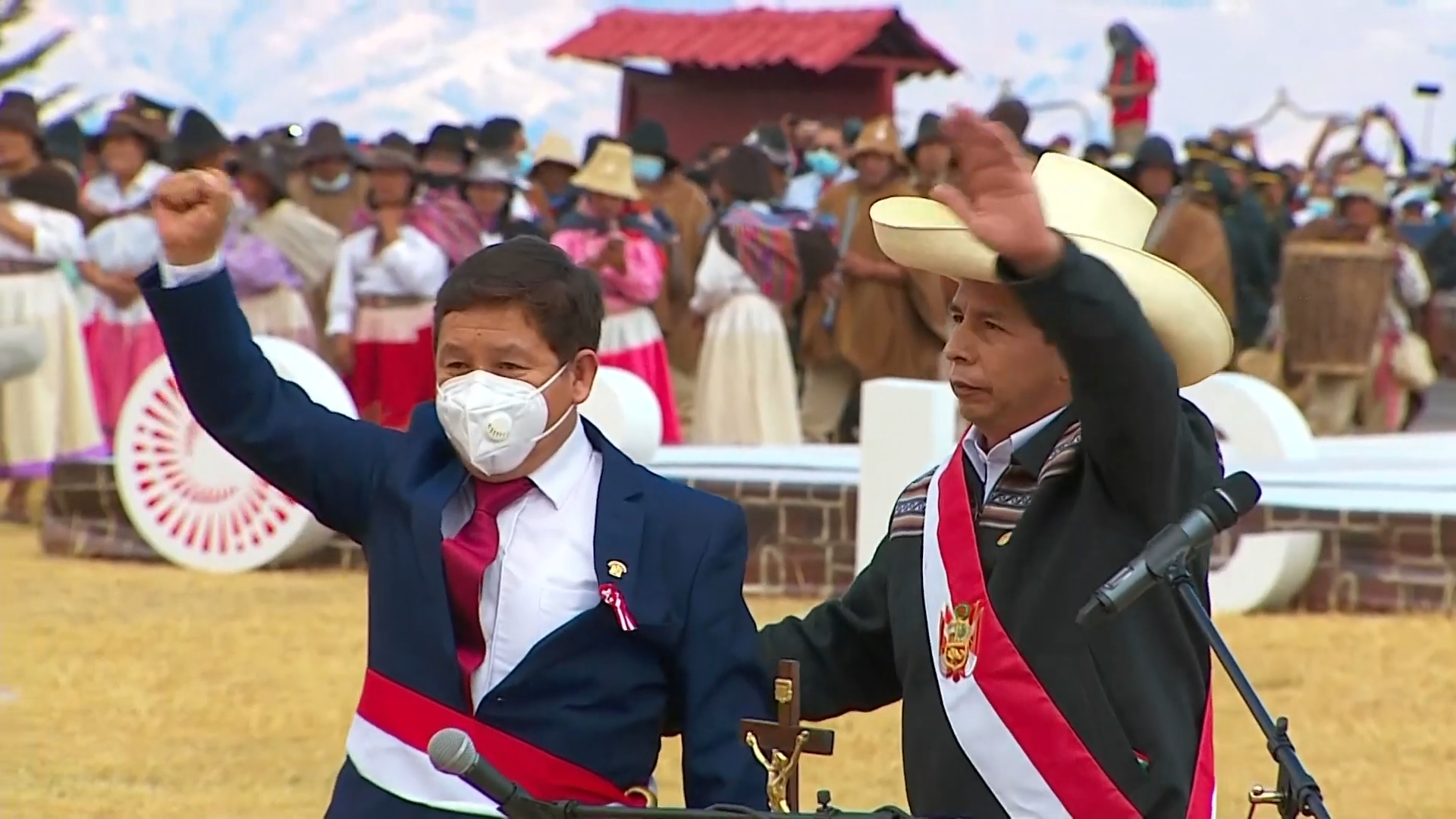
Guido Bellido being sworn in as Prime minister

He was named Prime Minister by President Pedro Castillo on 29 July 2021. During his inaugural speech to congress, Bellido spoke entirely in Quechua and was booed by opposition congressmen demanding that he speak in Spanish; Bellido finished his speech dedicating it "to all those Peruvians who died without ever understanding a word said in this Congress". As his first act as prime minister, Bellido traveled to Chumbivilcas Province to mediate between indigenous groups and the Las Bambas copper mine, directly negotiating with groups in Quechua and successfully establishing an agreement between the two parties.

On September 26, Bellido warned companies which drill for gas in the country to either pay higher taxes or face nationalization.

On 6 October, Bellido resigned as President of the Council of Ministers, after President Castillo asked for his resignation.
