= Wiluyu =

Wiluyu (Aymara wila blood, blood-red, uyu corral, "red corral", Hispanicized spellings Veluyo, Viluyo, Viluyu) may refer to:

- Wiluyu or Wiluyu Janq'u Uma, a mountain in the La Paz Department, Bolivia
- Wiluyu (Mañazo-Tiquillaca), a mountain on the border of the districts of Mañazo and Tiquillaca in the Puno Province, Puno Region, Peru
- Wiluyu (Marangani), a mountain in the Marangani District, Canchis Province, Cusco Region, Peru
- Wiluyu (Pitumarca), a mountain in the Pitumarca District, Canchis Province, Cusco Region, Peru
- Wiluyu (Tiquillaca), a mountain in the Tiquillaca District, Puno Province, Puno Region, Peru
