= Canas province =

Coordinates: 14°13′05″S 71°25′54″W

Canas
- Province
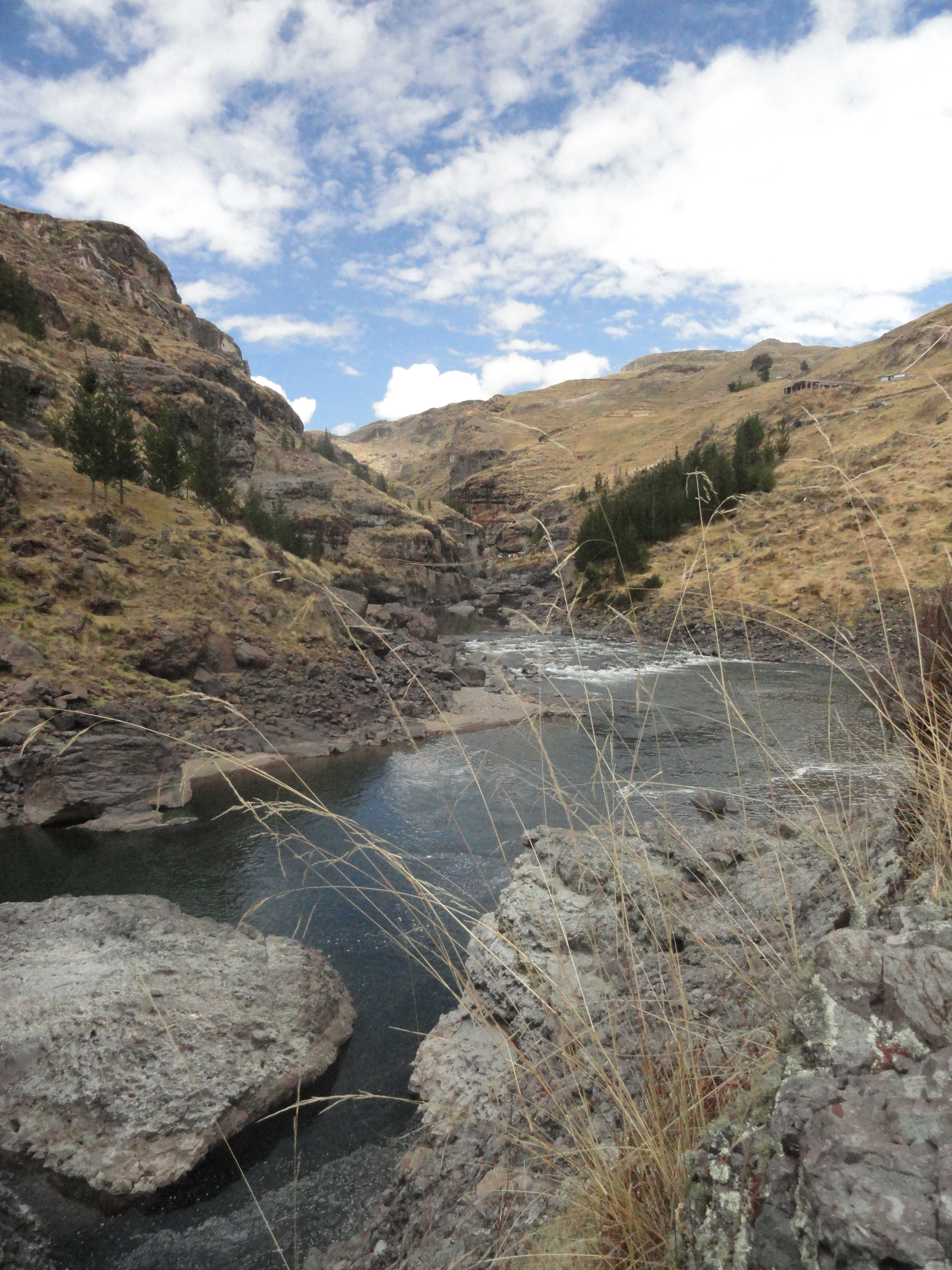
- Chilliwa (Festuca dolichophylla) growing at the Apurímac River in the Canas Province

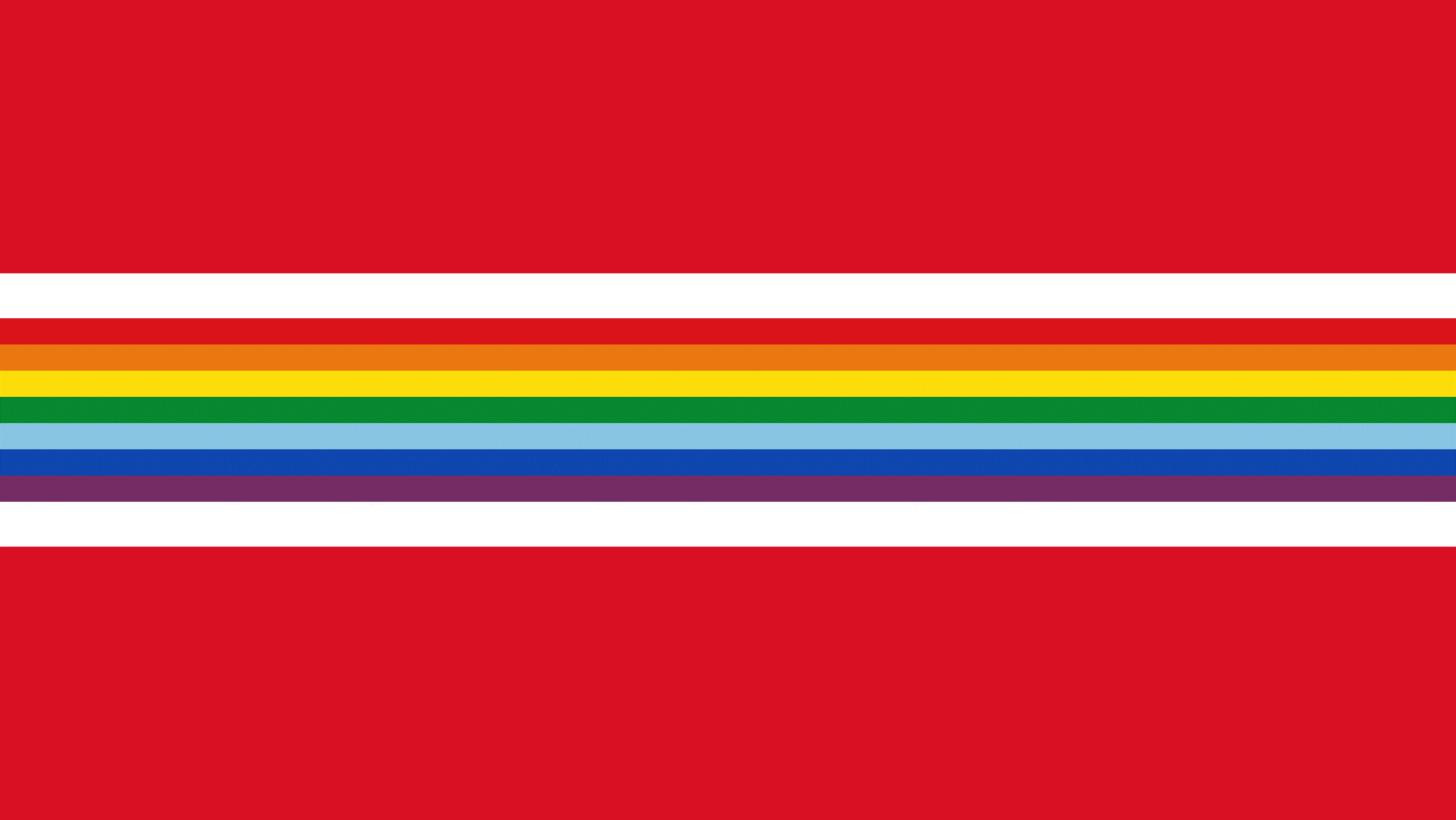
- Flag

- Location of Canas in the Cusco Region
- Country: Peru
- Region: Cusco
- Capital: Yanaoca

Government
  - Mayor: Juan Francisco Melendez Nina (2007)

Area
  - Total: 2,103.76 km^{2} (812.27 sq mi)

Population (2005 census)
  - Total: 42,368
  - Density: 20.139/km^{2} (52.160/sq mi)
- UBIGEO: 0805

Canas is one of thirteen provinces in the Cusco Region in the southern highlands of Peru.

== Geography ==
The La Raya mountain range traverses the province. Some of the highest mountains of the province are listed below:

- Anka Suka
- Aqu Saya
- Chimpulla
- Ch'iyar Jaqhi
- Ch'uwaña
- Hatun Ichhuna Kunka
- Hatun Ñan
- Huch'uy K'uchu
- Kunka
- Kuntur Sallana
- Kuntur Sinqa
- Laramani
- Mik'aya
- Pawka
- Pichaqani
- Puka Kancha
- Puka Urqu
- Pukara
- Q'ululu Kinray
- Sapan Warmi
- Tunka Suka
- Tuqtu
- Wanu Kunka
- Yana Ranra
- Yana Urqu
- Yawri Kunka

== Political division ==
The province is divided into eight districts (Spanish: distritos, singular: distrito), each of which is headed by a mayor (alcalde). The districts, with their capitals in parentheses, are:

- Checca (Checca)
- Kunturkanki (El Descanso)
- Langui (Langui)
- Layo (Layo)
- Pampamarca (Pampamarca)
- Quehue (Quehue)
- Túpac Amaru (Tungasuca)
- Yanaoca (Yanaoca)

== Ethnic groups ==
The people in the province are mainly indigenous citizens of Quechua descent. Quechua is the language which the majority of the population (91.62%) learnt to speak in childhood, 8.13% of the residents started speaking in Spanish.

== See also ==
- Tupay Tuqtu
