= Mamaniri =

Mountain in Peru

- Location within Peru

Highest point
- Elevation: 5,077 m (16,657 ft)
- Coordinates: 14°29′15″S 70°51′17″W

Geography
- Location: Peru, Puno Region
- Parent range: Andes, La Raya

Mamaniri (Aymara mamani falcon, hawk, -ni a suffix to indicate ownership, "the one with the falcon (or hawk)", also spelled Mamanire) is a 5,077-metre-high (16,657 ft) mountain in the La Raya mountain range in the Andes of Peru. It is situated in the Puno Region, Melgar Province, Santa Rosa District. Mamaniri lies near the La Raya pass northwest of Khunurana and Puka Urqu.
