= Suyt'uqucha =

Suyt'uqucha (Quechua suyt'u, sayt'u rectangular, qucha lake, "rectangular lake", also spelled Suitococha, Suytococha, Suytojocha, Suytuccocha) may refer to:

- Suyt'uqucha (Apurímac), a lake in the Apurímac Region in Peru
- Suyt'uqucha (Ayacucho), a lake in the Ayacucho Region, Peru
- Suyt'uqucha (Lampa), a lake in the Lampa Province, Puno Region, Peru
- Suyt'uqucha (Melgar), a lake in the Melgar Province, Puno Region, Peru
