= Marangani District =

Coordinates: 14.3533°S 71.1713°W

Marangani
- District
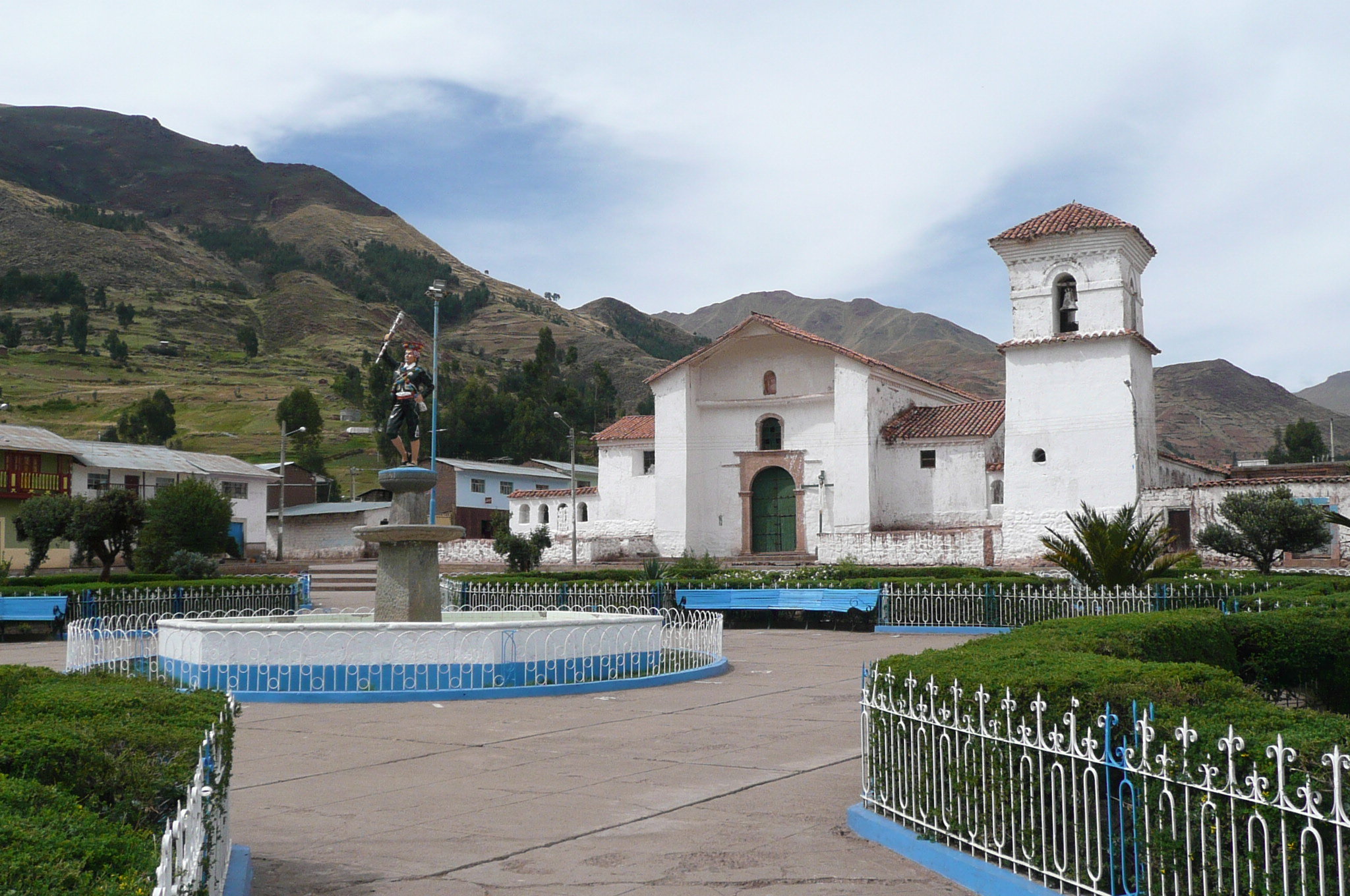
- Church in Marangani
- Interactive map of Marangani
- Country: Peru
- Region: Cusco
- Province: Canchis
- Founded: August 29, 1834
- Capital: Marangani

Government
  - Mayor: Zenobio Zuñiga Nina

Area
  - Total: 432.65 km^{2} (167.05 sq mi)
- Elevation: 3,709 m (12,169 ft)

Population (2005 census)
  - Total: 12,404
  - Density: 28.670/km^{2} (74.255/sq mi)
- Time zone: UTC-5 (PET)
- UBIGEO: 080604

Marangani District is one of eight districts of the province Canchis in Peru.

== Geography ==
The La Raya mountain range traverses the district. Some of the highest mountains are listed below:

- Anta
- Awkar Utt'aña
- Chaku Apachita
- Chawpi Tiyana
- Chinchina
- Ch'ullu
- Hatun Awkara
- Hatun Wayq'u
- Huch'uy Awkara
- Huch'uy K'uchu
- Kuntur Quta
- Kuntur Sallana
- Laram Quta
- Mulluq'usi
- Pachas Kunka
- Pawka
- Pichaqani
- Pirwa
- Puka Urqu
- Qillqa
- Qillqa Q'asa
- Qullqini
- Sankha Urqu
- Sura Quta
- Urqu Puñuna
- Wayu Kunka
- Wiluyu
- Yana Ranra
- Yana Salla
- Yana Urqu
- Yaritani

The most important river of the district is the Willkanuta which crosses the district from southeast to northwest.

== Ethnic groups ==
The people in the district are mainly indigenous citizens of Quechua descent. Quechua is the language which the majority of the population (80.81%) learnt to speak in childhood, 18.82% of the residents started speaking using the Spanish language (2007 Peru Census).
