= Puka Urqu (Canas-Canchis) =

Mountain in Peru

- Location within Peru

Highest point
- Elevation: 4,954 m (16,253 ft)
- Coordinates: 14°27′33″S 71°06′10″W

Geography
- Location: Peru, Cusco Region
- Parent range: Andes

Puka Urqu (Quechua puka red, urqu mountain, "red mountain", Hispanicized spelling Pucaorcco) is a 4,954-metre-high (16,253 ft) mountain in the western extensions of the La Raya mountain range in the Andes of Peru. It is situated in the Cusco Region, Canas Province, Layo District, and in the Canchis Province, Marangani District.
