= Hatun Ichhuna Kunka =

Mountain in Peru

- Location within Peru

Highest point
- Elevation: 5,000 m (16,000 ft)
- Coordinates: 14°30′09″S 70°59′57″W

Geography
- Location: Peru, Cusco Region, Puno Region
- Parent range: Andes, La Raya

Hatun Ichhuna Kunka (Quechua hatun big, ichhuna a sickle to cut off ichhu, "big sickle throat", Hispanicized spellings Atun Ichunacunca, Atún Ichunacunca) is a mountain in the La Raya mountain range in the Andes of Peru, about 5,000 metres (16,404 ft) high. It is located in the Cusco Region, Canas Province, Layo District, and in the Puno Region, Melgar Province, Santa Rosa District. Hatun Ichhuna Kunka lies near the La Raya pass southwest of Kunka. Huch'uy Ichhuna Kunka ("little sickle throat" or "little Ichhunakunka") and Pichaqani are the lower elevations of the ridge to the northwest.
