= Huaylía =

Type of dance and music of Peru

The huaylía or wayliya is a genre of Andean music and dance from Peru that is typically performed near Christmas. The music and dance is typical to the central and southern highlands of Peru more specifically to the following areas: Apurímac, Ayacucho, Cusco, Huancavelica and Junín. Huaylía de Chumbivilcas is a variant from the department of Cusco in the south of the country that obtained official recognition as a National Cultural Heritage in 2016. The huailía de Chumbivilcas is the music traditionally played at the takanakuy fights.
