= José Velásquez (footballer, born 1998) =

Peruvian footballer

Personal information
- Full name: José Junhior Velásquez Huillca
- Date of birth: 29 October 1998 (age 28)
- Place of birth: Langui, Peru
- Height: 1.70 m (5 ft 7 in)
- Position: Right-back

Youth career
- Real Garcilaso

Senior career*
Years	Team	Apps	(Gls)
2017–2023	Cusco	71	(1)
2025	Juventud Alfa		
- * Club domestic league appearances and goals as of 19:09, 24 January 2024 (UTC)

José Junhior Velásquez Huillca (born 29 October 1998) is a Peruvian footballer who plays as a right-back.

== Club career ==
=== Real Garcilaso / Cusco ===
Living far from Cusco - in Langui - Velasquez had to travel three and a half hours to get to training every day, close to nine hours of travelling daily.

On 8 March 2017, Velásquez got his official debut for Real Garcilaso against Juan Aurich. He started on the bench, before replacing Jhoel Herrera. He played a total of nine league games in that season.

In the following two seasons, Velásquez played 21 league games. Real Garcilaso changed name to Cusco FC for the 2020 season. At the end of 2023, Velásquez left Cusco FC.

=== Later clubs ===
In 2025, after more than a year without a club, Velásquez suddenly appeared as part of the matchday squad of the Peruvian club Juventud Alfa FC on the club’s official Facebook page.

== Personal life ==
Velásquez was named after former Alianza Lima-player, José Velásquez, because his father was a huge Alianza fan. Both his brothers is also named José; his older brother is named Frank José and his younger brother is also named José.
