= José Velásquez (explorer) =

José Velasquez was a Spanish soldier who served in areas of New Spain in California

- Born: 1717; San Ildefonso de Ostimuri, New Spain
- Died: 1785 (aged 67–68)
- Occupations: soldier and explorer

José Velásquez (1717–1785) was a Spanish soldier who served in Baja California, Alta California and other areas of New Spain, leading notable exploring expeditions and describing the region in his diaries and reports. He was born at San Ildefonso de Ostimuri which shortly after his birth was made part of the Provincias de Sonora, Ostimuri y Sinaloa (also known as New Navarre). This was in what was then New Spain.

== Biography ==
Velásquez was born in San Ildefonso de Ostimuri, Sonora. In 1751, he enlisted as a private in the military forces based at Loreto, Baja California Sur, under the administration of the Jesuit missionaries.

When the Jesuits were expelled from Baja California and the Franciscans and the government of New Spain assumed responsibility for the peninsula in 1768, Velásquez was promoted to the rank of corporal. He apparently travelled with the Portolà expedition, first overland party to San Diego and Monterey in Alta California in 1769-1770. Velásquez served under Fernando Rivera y Moncada, second in command of the expedition. At Monterey in 1770 he was dispatched south with documents, travelling overland as far as southern Baja California Sur and from there to San Blas and Mexico City.

Velásquez returned to Baja California in 1771 and was promoted to sergeant. In 1773 he was again promoted, to the rank of alférez (ensign), and put in command of the military detachment at Velicatá.

In 1773, the Dominicans replaced the Franciscans in Baja California, and the remainder of Junipero Serra's Franciscans went north into Alta California. An important part of Velásquez' duties was to locate potential sites for Dominican missions in the frontier zone between Velicatá and San Diego. He led expeditions that located the sites of El Rosario, Santo Domingo, and San Vicente. He also explored the desert lying to the east of the Sierra San Pedro Mártir.

Velásquez was transferred in 1780 to the presidio of San Diego, where he served as second in command. In July 1781, the Quechan Indians on the lower Colorado River rose in revolt and killed Hispanic missionaries, settlers, and travelers. Velásquez was in charge of the San Diego detachment that was sent to punish the rebels (with little success).

In 1783 Velásquez led an exploratory party that reconnoitered the backcountry east of San Diego for a possible more direct route to the lower Colorado River. In 1785, he led a more ambitious exploration that went from San Vicente northeast to the lower Colorado River and Imperial Valley, and then back to San Diego.

Velásquez described his explorations in several diaries or reports that have subsequently been published. These are important sources on the early history and ethnography of the region.
