= Kunka =

Mountain in Peru

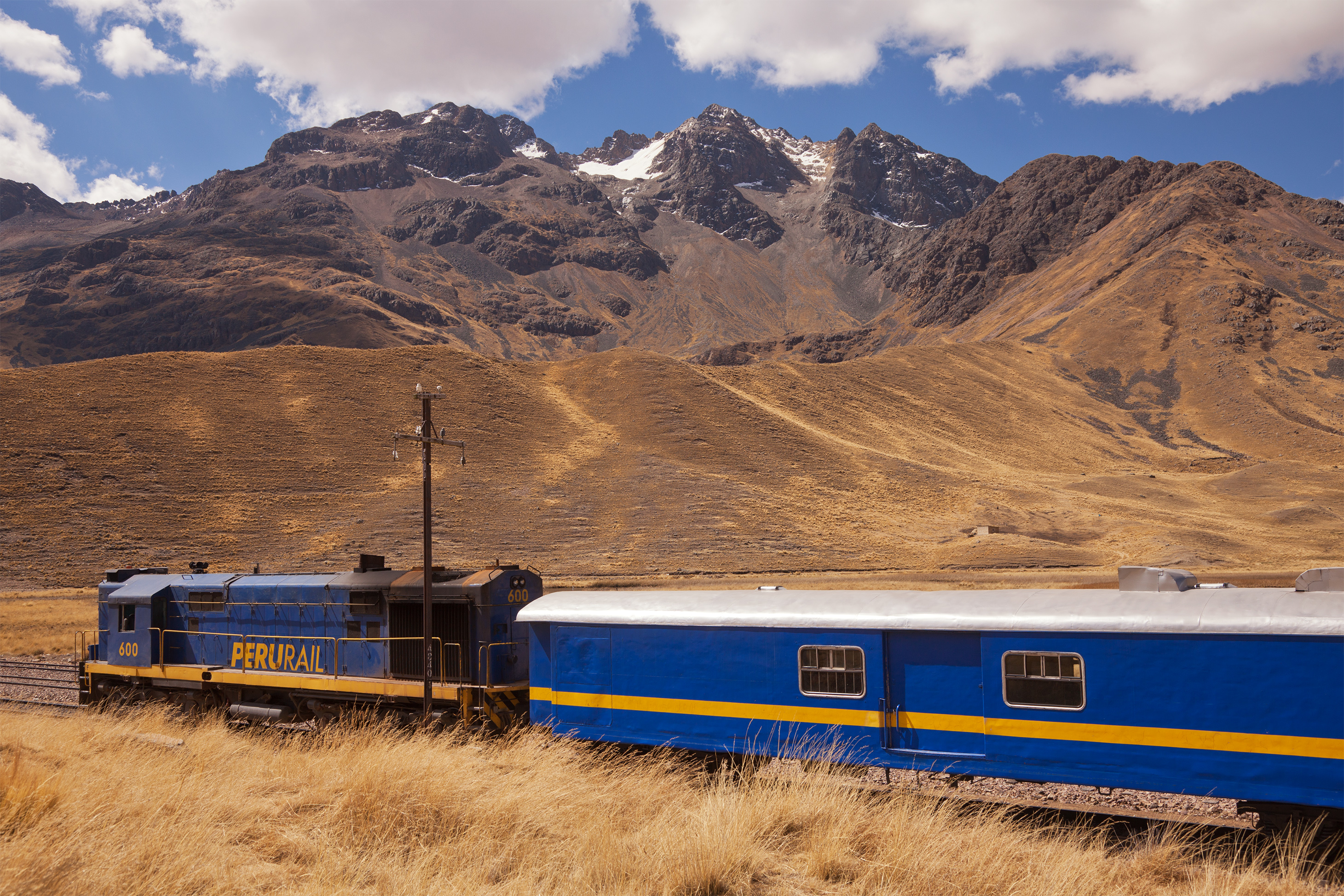
- The train from Lake Titicaca to Cusco near La Raya pass with Kunka in the background

Highest point
- Elevation: 5,200 m (17,100 ft)
- Coordinates: 14°27′40″S 70°59′00″W

Geography
- Location within Peru
- Location: Peru, Puno Region
- Parent range: Andes, La Raya

Kunka (Aymara and Quechua for 'throat, gullet, neck, voice', Hispanicized spelling Cunca) is a mountain in the La Raya mountain range in the Andes of Peru. It is situated at the La Raya Pass and the road and rail which connect Cusco with Lake Titicaca. It is located in the Cusco Region, Canas Province, Layo District, and in the Puno Region, Melgar Province, Santa Rosa District, and about 5,200 metres (17,060 ft) high. Kunka lies southwest of the mountains Yana Khuchilla and Chimpulla. Other neighboring mountains are Huch'uy K'uchu north of it and Hatun Ichhuna Kunka in the south. Between the road and the mountain is a small lake, Q'umirqucha (Quechua q'umir 'green', qucha 'lake', 'green lake', Comercocha).

North of Kunka is a stream called Hatun K'uchu (Quechua for 'big corner', Hispanicized Atuncucho). It is an affluent of the Willkanuta River which originates near the pass.

== Images ==
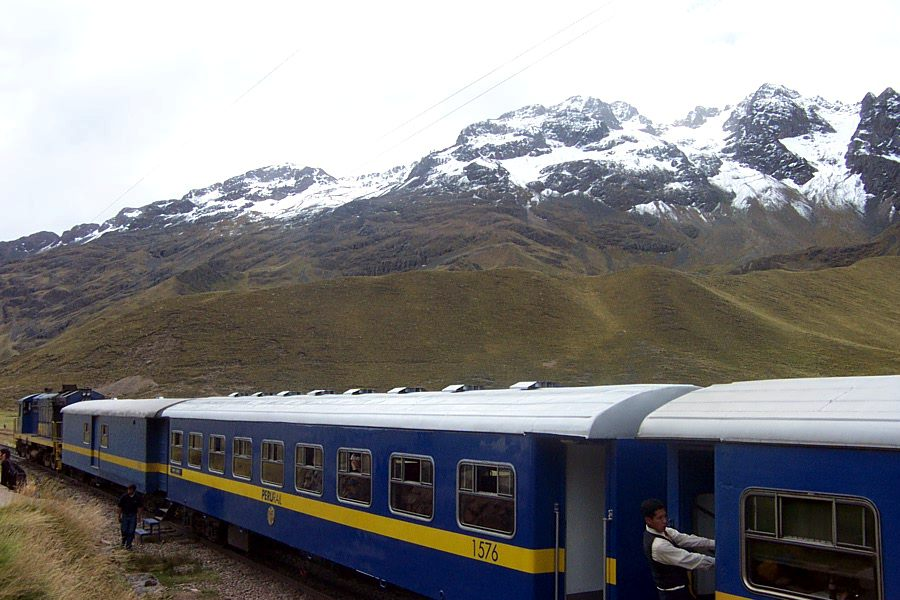
Train near La Raya station with Kunka (center) in the background
