= Layo District =

Coordinates: 14.5054°S 71.2253°W

Layo Layu
- District
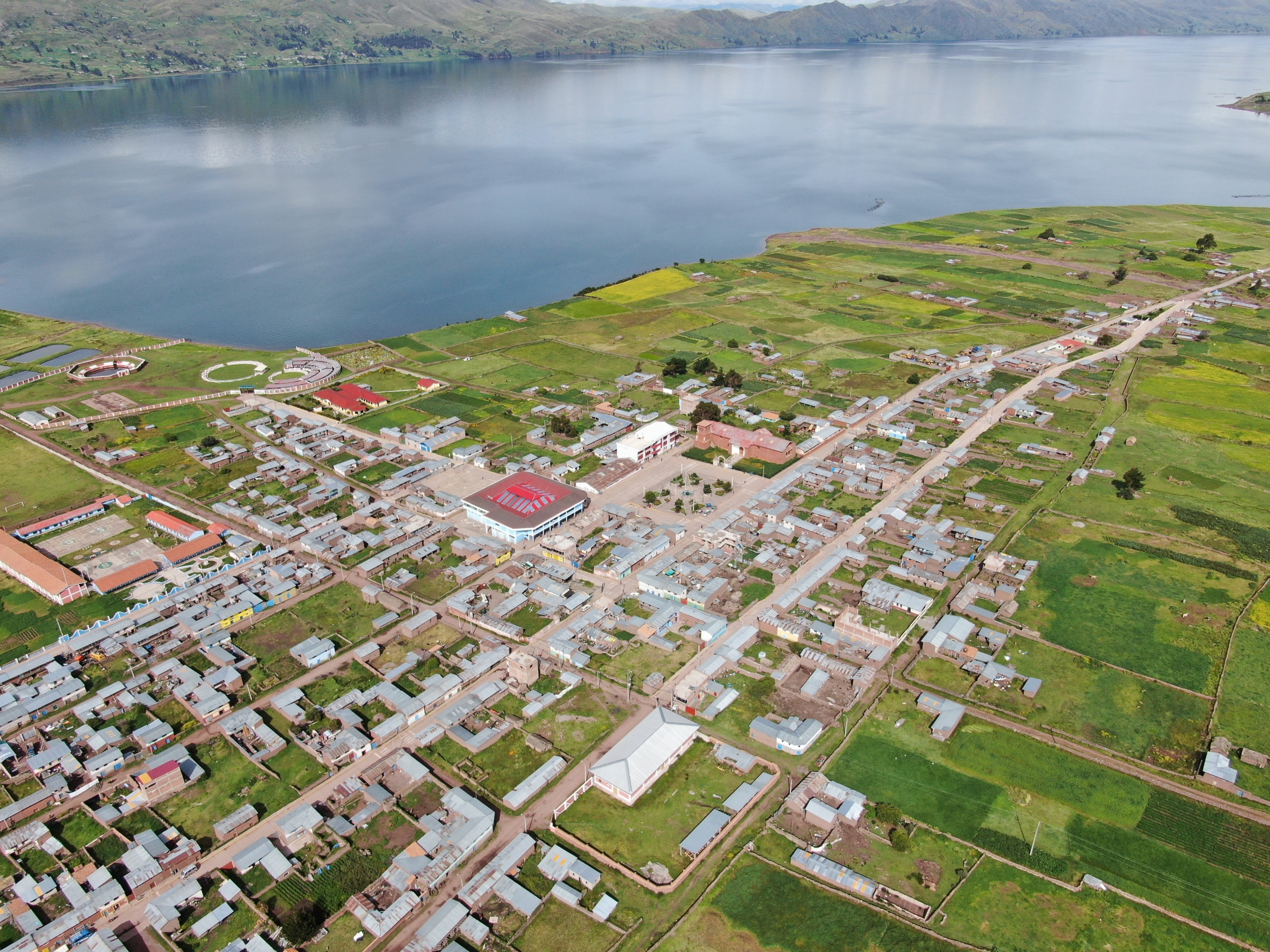
- The train the Belmond Andean Explorer at La Raya Station with market stalls and the mountain Chimpulla in the background, Layo District-Santa Rosa District

- Location of Layo in the Canas province
- Country: Peru
- Region: Cusco
- Province: Canas
- Founded: January 2, 1857
- Capital: Layo

Government
  - Mayor: Alfredo Bustamante Aragón; Gestión (2023-2026)

Area
  - Total: 452.56 km^{2} (174.73 sq mi)
- Elevation: 3,978 m (13,051 ft)

Population (2005 census)
  - Total: 6,822
  - Density: 15.07/km^{2} (39.04/sq mi)
- Time zone: UTC-5 (PET)
- UBIGEO: 080505

Layo District is one of eight districts in the Canas Province in Peru. The seat of the Layo District is the village Layo.

== Geography ==
The La Raya mountain range traverses the district. Some of the highest mountains of the district are listed below:

- Anta
- Anta Pata
- Aqu Muqu
- Chayña Tira
- Chawpi Tira
- Chimpulla
- Ch'ulluni
- Hatun Ichhuna Kunka
- Huch'uy K'uchu
- Jichu Qullu
- Kancha
- Kimsa Urqu
- Kiswarani
- Kunka
- Kuntur Sallana
- Laramani
- Pawka
- Pichaqani
- Pinqulluni
- Puka Puka
- Puka Urqu
- Pukara
- Phawsi Urqu
- Qayqu
- Q'atawi
- Sapan Warmi
- Saywani
- Suntur Qullu
- Sura Quta
- Tika Pallana
- Waylla Kunka
- Yana Ranra

== Ethnic groups ==
The people in the district are mainly indigenous citizens of Quechua descent. Quechua is the language which the majority of the population (90.47%) learnt to speak in childhood, 9.39% of the residents started speaking using the Spanish language (2007 Peru Census).
