= Misión Nuestra Señora del Santísimo Rosario de Viñadaco =

18th-century Spanish mission in Baja California, Mexico

- Location in Baja California Location in Mexico
- Location: El Rosario, Baja California, Mexico
- Coordinates: 30°02′29″N 115°44′20″W
- Name as founded: Misión Nuestra Señora del Santísimo Rosario de Viñadaco
- Patron: Our Lady of the Rosary
- Founded: 1774
- Founding Order: Dominican
- Native tribe(s) Spanish name(s): Cochimí

Mission Nuestra Señora del Santísimo Rosario de Viñadaco (Spanish: Misión Nuestra Señora del Santísimo Rosario de Viñadaco), also known as Misión El Rosario, was the first Dominican mission in Baja California, established in 1774 by Vicente Mora and Francisco Galisteo near the modern town of El Rosario.

== History ==
When the Dominicans took over the mission field of Baja California from the Franciscans in 1773, the missions in the central and southern parts of the peninsula were in evident decline, as their Indian populations dwindled under the impact of Old World diseases. However, the northern portion of the peninsula, only recently reconnoitered by Gaspar de Portolá and Junipero Serra, had much more potential.

The site of El Rosario, located near the western coast among the northernmost Cochimí Indians, was chosen as the initial Dominican mission site. The location had been initially identified by the soldier José Velásquez in 1770 and had been favored by the Franciscans as a potential mission site. Its native name was variously given as Viñadaco, Miñaraco, and Viñatacot.

In 1802, the mission was moved from its first site to a location about 6 kilometers closer to the coast with more space, more agricultural land, and better access to external supplies. When the second site ceased to function as a mission in 1832, it was turned over to local residents. Ruined walls and foundations from both the first and the second mission survive.

== See also ==
- Spanish missions in Baja California
