= Quehue District =

Coordinates: 14.3800°S 71.4552°W

Quehue Q'iwi
- District
- Location of Quehue in the Canas province
- Country: Peru
- Region: Cusco
- Province: Canas
- Founded: November 17, 1917
- Capital: Quehue

Government
  - Mayor: Hilario Callo Tapia (2007)

Area
  - Total: 143.46 km^{2} (55.39 sq mi)
- Elevation: 3,792 m (12,441 ft)

Population (2005 census)
  - Total: 3,544
  - Density: 24.70/km^{2} (63.98/sq mi)
- Time zone: UTC-5 (PET)
- UBIGEO: 080507

Quehue (Aymara and Quechua: Q'iwi, meaning curve(d)) is one of eight districts in the Canas Province in Peru. Its seat is the village of Quehue.

== Geography ==
One of the highest peaks of the district is Ch'iyar Jaqhi at 4,654 m (15,269 ft). Other mountains are listed below:

- Ch'uwaña
- Luntuni
- Qullani Urqu
- Q'asa Saya
- Tuqtu
- Awki Tutukani

== Ethnic groups ==
The people in the district are mainly indigenous citizens of Quechua descent. Quechua is the language which the majority of the population (97.36%) learnt to speak in childhood, 2.41% of the residents started speaking using the Spanish language (2007 Peru Census).

== See also ==
- Tupay Tuqtu
