= Tuqtu (Canas-Chumbivilcas) =

Mountain in Peru

- Location within Peru

Highest point
- Elevation: 4,400 m (14,400 ft)
- Coordinates: 14°23′30″S 71°33′15″W

Geography
- Location: Peru, Cusco Region, Canas Province, Chumbivilcas Province
- Parent range: Andes

Tuqtu (Quechua for "broody hen", also spelled Tucto) is a mountain in the Andes of Peru. Its summit reaches about 4,400 m (14,436 ft) above sea level. The mountain is located in the Cusco Region, Canas Province, Quehue District, and in the Chumbivilcas Province, Livitaca District. Annually the Tupay Tuqtu festival which has been declared a National Cultura Heritage takes places at the mountain.

Southwest of Tuqtu, also on the border of the provinces of Canas and Chumbivilcas, there is a 4,750.9-metre-high (15,587 ft) peak named Tuqtu (Tocto). It lies at 14°24′50″S 71°31′00″W.
