= Kunturkanki District =

Coordinates: 14.5346°S 71.3070°W

Kunturkanki
- District
- Location of Kunturkanki in the Canas province
- Country: Peru
- Region: Cusco
- Province: Canas
- Founded: January 7, 1961
- Capital: El Descanso

Government
  - Mayor: Valerio Pacuala Huillca (2007)

Area
  - Total: 376.19 km^{2} (145.25 sq mi)
- Elevation: 3,940 m (12,930 ft)

Population (2005 census)
  - Total: 6,256
  - Density: 16.63/km^{2} (43.07/sq mi)
- Time zone: UTC-5 (PET)
- UBIGEO: 080503

Kunturkanki District is one of eight districts in the Canas Province in Peru. Its seat is the village of El Descanso.

== Geography ==
One of the highest peaks of the district is Laramani at 4,923 m (16,152 ft). Other mountains are listed below:

- Anta Qalla
- Anta Qaqa
- Chilli Kunka
- Ch'apini
- Ch'iqta Qaqa
- Ch'uch'u
- Ch'uspini
- Hatun Sawsalla
- Hatun Sipa
- Imilla
- Kiswarani
- Kiwuni
- Llallawi
- Pichaqani
- Pukara
- Quyllurani
- Q'atawi
- Salla
- Suntur Qullu
- Supan Tira
- Tika Pallana
- Waki Wakiña
- Wank'a Saya
- Waraquki
- Wark'a Kancha
- Wisk'achani
- Yana Urqu

== Ethnic groups ==
The people in the district are mainly indigenous citizens of Quechua descent. Quechua is the language which the majority of the population (89.61%) learnt to speak in childhood, 10.26% of the residents started speaking using the Spanish language (2007 Peru Census).
