= Pichigua District =

Coordinates: 14.6779°S 71.4060°W

Pichigua Pichiwa
- District
- Interactive map of Pichigua
- Country: Peru
- Region: Cusco
- Province: Espinar
- Founded: August 29, 1834
- Capital: Pichigua

Government
  - Mayor: Severiano Chara Labra

Area
  - Total: 288.76 km^{2} (111.49 sq mi)
- Elevation: 3,870 m (12,700 ft)

Population (2005 census)
  - Total: 3,791
  - Density: 13.13/km^{2} (34.00/sq mi)
- Time zone: UTC-5 (PET)
- UBIGEO: 080806

Pichigua District is one of eight districts of the Espinar Province in Peru.

== Geography ==
One of the highest peaks of the district is Laramani at approximately 4,922 m (16,148 ft). Other mountains are listed below:

- Anku Supa
- Ararankha
- Ch'uspini
- Kuntur Sayana
- Muru Pata
- Muru Sirk'a
- Puma Ichhu Pukara
- Qurani
- Waya Muqu

== Ethnic groups ==
The people in the district are mainly indigenous citizens of Quechua descent. Quechua is the language which the majority of the population (87.16%) learnt to speak in childhood, 12.40% of the residents started speaking using the Spanish language (2007 Peru Census).
