= Puka Urqu (Puno) =

Mountain in Peru

- Location within Peru

Highest point
- Elevation: 5,000 m (16,000 ft)
- Coordinates: 14°30′25″S 70°49′54″W

Geography
- Location: Peru, Puno Region
- Parent range: Andes, La Raya

Puka Urqu (Quechua puka red, urqu mountain, "red mountain", Hispanicized spelling Pucaorjo) is a mountain in the La Raya mountain range in the Andes of Peru, about 5,000 metres (16,404 ft) high. It is situated in the Puno Region, Melgar Province, Santa Rosa District. Puka Urqu lies near the La Raya pass north of Khunurana.
