= Huch'uy K'uchu =

Mountain in Peru

- Location within Peru

Highest point
- Elevation: 5,339 m (17,516 ft)
- Coordinates: 14°25′44″S 70°59′48″W

Geography
- Location: Peru, Cusco Region, Canas Province, Canchis Province
- Parent range: Andes, La Raya

Huch'uy K'uchu (Quechua huch'uy small (juch'uy in Bolivia), k'uchu corner, "small corner", Hispanicized spelling Uchuycucho) is a 5,339-metre-high (17,516 ft) mountain in the La Raya mountain range in the Andes of Peru. It is located in the Cusco Region, Canas Province, Layo District, and in the Canchis Province, Marangani District. Huch'uy K'uchu lies near the La Raya pass northwest of Chimpulla and north of Kunka. It stretches along the Hatun K'uchu valley ("big corner", Atuncucho) from west to east whose stream flows to the Willkanuta River.
