= Pawka =

Mountain in Peru

- Location within Peru

Highest point
- Elevation: 5,129 m (16,827 ft)
- Coordinates: 14°26′24″S 71°09′25″W

Geography
- Location: Peru, Cusco Region
- Parent range: Andes

Pawka (Quechua for a plant (Escallonia herrerae), Hispanicized spellings Pauca, Paucca) is a 5,129-metre-high (16,827 ft) mountain in the Andes of Peru. It is located in the Cusco Region, Canas Province, Layo District, and in the Canchis Province, Marangani District. Pawka lies east of Langui Layo Lake.
