= Layo, Cusco =

Coordinates: 14.5068°S 71.1570°W

Layo
- Village
- Interactive map of Layo
- Country: Peru
- Region: Cusco Region
- Province: Canas Province
- District: Layo District

Government
  - Mayor: Alfredo Bustamante Aragón (2023)
- Elevation: 3,978 m (13,051 ft)
- Time zone: UTC-5 (PET)

Layo is a village and the capital of the Layo District, Canas Province, Cusco Region, Peru.

It is located in the southern highlands of Peru.
