= History of Sonora =

History of the Mexican state

This article details the history of Sonora. The Free and Sovereign State of Sonora is one of 31 states that, with the Federal District, comprise the 32 Federal Entities of Mexico. It is divided into 72 municipalities; the capital city is Hermosillo. Sonora is located in Northwest Mexico, bordered by the states of Chihuahua to the east, Baja California to the northwest and Sinaloa to the south. To the north, it shares the U.S.–Mexico border with the states of Arizona and New Mexico, and on the west has a significant share of the coastline of the Gulf of California.

Our Lady of the Rosary, or Nuestra Señora del Rosario, disputed origin of the name Sonora.

== Name ==
There are various possible histories as to the origin of the name Sonora. One states that the name was derived from "Nuestra Señora", the name given to the territory when Diego de Guzmán crossed the Yaqui River on 7 October, the day of Nuestra Señora del Rosario (Our Lady of the Rosary). The name's pronunciation may have changed in part because none of the indigenous languages of the area have the "ñ" sound. Another version states that Álvar Núñez Cabeza de Vaca and his companions, who were wrecked on the Florida coast and made their way across the continent, were forced to cross present-day Sonora from north to south, carrying an image of Nuestra Señora de las Angustias (Our Lady of Anguish) on a cloth. This group encountered the Opata people, who could not pronounced "Señora", instead saying Senora or Sonora. A third version, written by Cristóbal de Cañas in 1730, states that the name comes from the word for a natural water well, "sonot" which the Spanish eventually modified to Sonora. It is not known if any of these stories are true. The first to use the name Sonora was explorer Francisco Vásquez de Coronado who passed through the state in 1540, calling part of the area the "Valle de La Señora". In 1567, Francisco de Ibarra also traveled through and referred to the "Valles of Señora".

== Pre Hispanic period ==
The Casas Grandes tradition influenced over Sonoran Traditions.

Evidence of human existence in the state dates back over 10,000 years, with some of the best known remains at the San Dieguito complex in the El Pinacate Desert. The first humans were nomadic hunter gatherers and used stone, seashell and wooden tools.

The oldest Clovis culture site in North America is believed to be El Fin del Mundo in northwestern Sonora. It features occupation dating around 13,390 calibrated years BP. In 2011, remains of Gomphothere were found; the evidence suggests that humans did in fact kill two of them here.

In much of the prehistoric period, the environmental conditions were less severe than they are today. Vegetation was similar, but its distribution was wider and denser.

Agriculture first appears around 400 BCE and 200 CE in the river valleys. Ceramics developed after 750 CE and would diversity between 800 and 1350. Between 1100 and 1350, the region had small but somewhat socially complex villages, which were involved in well-developed trade networks. One exception to this was the lowland central coast, which never truly adopted agriculture. Sonora and much of the northwest is not considered to be part of Mesoamerica, with Guasave in Sinaloa the most northwestern Mesoamerican settlement known, but there is evidence of trade between the peoples of Sonora and Mesoamerica.

Three distance cultures developed in the low flat areas of the state near the coast called the Trincheras tradition, the Huatabampo tradition and the Central Coast tradition. The Trincheras tradition is dated to between 750 and 1450 CE and mostly known from sites in the Altar, Magdalena and Concepción valleys, but their range extended from the Gulf of California into northern Sonora. The tradition is named after trenches found in a number of sites, the best known of which is the Cerro de Trincheras. The Huatabampo tradition is centered south of the Trincheras along the coast, with sites along extinct lagoons, estuaries and river valleys. The pottery is distinctive. The culture shows similarities with the Chametla to the south and the Hohokam to the north. It probably disappeared around 1000 CE. Unlike the other two tradition, the Central Coast remained a hunter-gatherer culture, as the area lacks the resources for agriculture.

The higher elevations of the state were dominated by the Río Sonora and Casas Grandes traditions. The Río Sonora culture is located in central Sonora from the border area to modern Sinaloa. A beginning date for this culture has not been determined but it probably disappeared by the early 1300s. The Casas Grandes tradition in Sonora was an extension of that based in the modern state of Chihuahua, and these people exerted their influence down to parts of the Sonoran coast.

Climatic changes in the middle of the 15th century resulted in the increased desertification of Sonora and northwest Mexico in general. This is the probable cause for the drastic decrease in the number and size of settlements starting around this time. Those peoples who remained in the area reverted to a less complex social organization and lifestyle. Whatever socially complex organization existed in Sonora before the Spanish was long gone by the 16th century.

== Colonial period ==
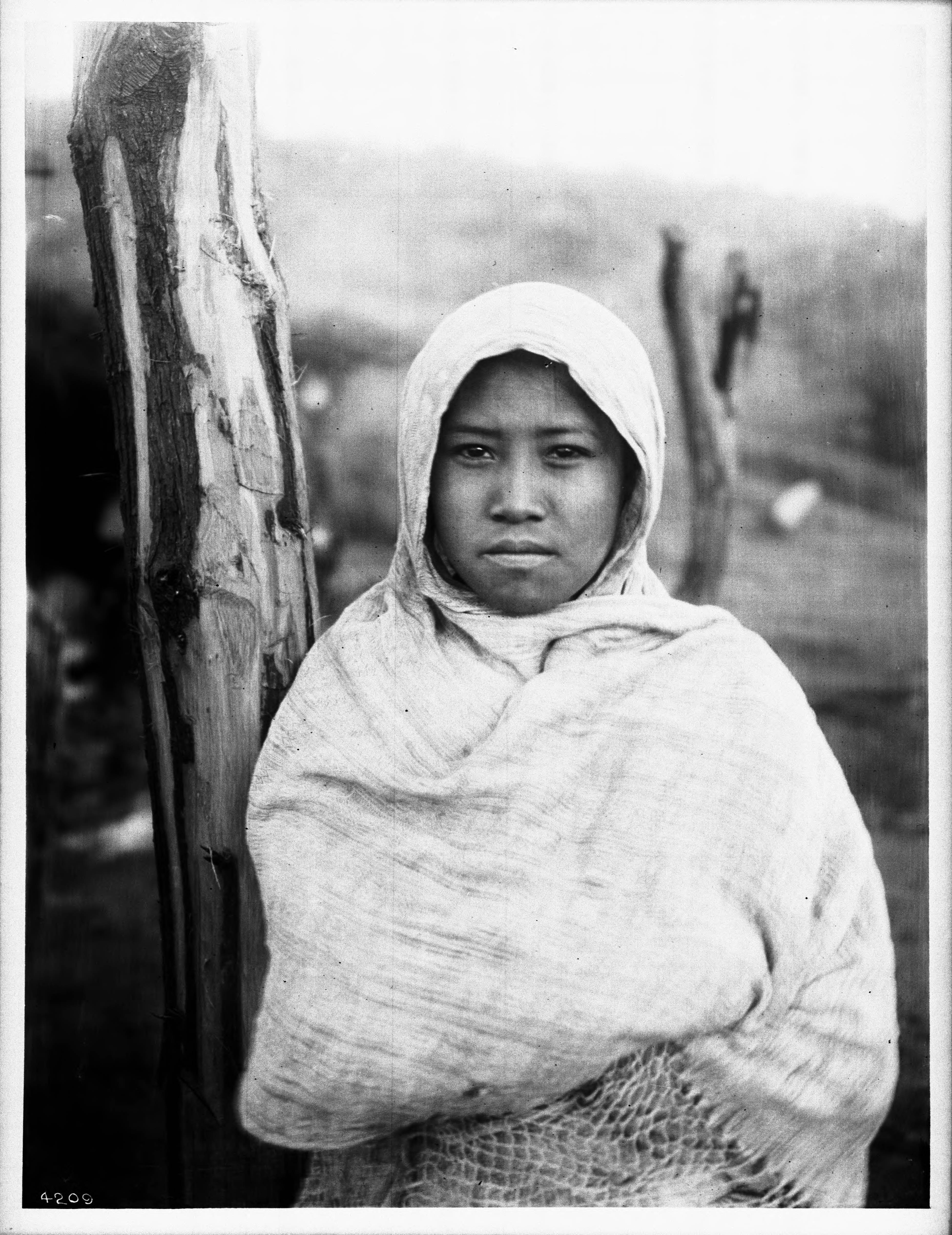
The Yaqui tribe is known for their constant resistance to strangers, including Europeans.

There is little reliable information about the area for the 16th century, just after the Spanish conquest of the Aztec Empire. Some state that the first Spanish settlement was founded by Álvar Núñez Cabeza de Vaca in 1530, near Huépac. Others state that Francisco Vásquez de Coronado founded a village on the edge of the Yaqui River in 1540 on his way north... Others state that the first Spanish presence was not until 1614, by missionaries such as Pedro Méndez and Pérez de Rivas, working with the Mayo. Unlike Mesoamerica in central Mexico, there was no central social or economic centralization in the Sonora area, given the collapse of population centers in the 15th century. The five traditions of the past had broken down to a number of fractured ethnicities. There was no empire or other system for the Spanish to co-opt for domination purposes. In addition, there was Yaqui resistance to European intrusion on their lands, which would keep the Spanish out of their area until the 1600s. While there was exploration of the area through the expeditions of the 16th century, significant permanent Spanish settlement would not be possible until the establishment of the mission system.

Jesuit priests did begin to work in the Sonora area in the 1610s in the lowlands near the coast. Originally, these missionaries worked out a peaceful compromise with the 30,000 Yaquis allowing for the establishment of more than fifty mission settlements in the Sonora river valleys. This broke down when the Jesuits opposed the native shamans who mediated between the living and the dead. The Opata were more receptive to the missionaries and allied with them. After this, the Jesuits began to move into Pima and Tohono O'odham territories. Spanish exploration and missionary work was sufficient to consider the territory part of New Spain. An agreement between General Pedro de Perea and the viceroy of New Spain resulted in the general shaping of the province, initially called Nueva Andalucia in 1637, but renamed Sonora in 1648.

The most famous missionary of Sonora, as well as much of what is now the U.S. Southwest, is Italian Jesuit Eusebio Francisco Chini, better known as Father Kino. He arrived to Sonora in 1687, beginning missionary work in the Pimería Alta area of Sonora and Arizona. He began his first mission at Cucurpe, then established churches and mission in other villages such as Los Remedios, Imuris, Magdalena, Cocóspera, San Ignacio, Tubutama, Caborca and others. He also taught European farming techniques to the indigenous he preached, in order to develop an economy for the benefit of the natives. He died in 1711.

The initial attraction of Sonora for the Spanish was its fertile farmlands along the river valleys and its position as part of a corridor that linked the central Mexican highlands (Mexico City area) up the Pacific coast and on into Arizona and points north. This corridor still exists in the form of Federal Highway 15. After the establishment of the mission system, Spanish colonists followed. Indigenous response was a mixture of accommodation and violence, as different strategies were employed by different groups at different times. The sporadic violence, which would continue throughout the colonial period, resulted in the Spanish building presidios and other fortifications to protect missions and Spanish settlements. While the colonization process was not especially violent, the impact on the indigenous of the area was severe, as it almost completely disrupted their formerly very independent lives, forcing them to conform to an alien centralized system. One consequence of this was alcoholism among the native peoples.

In 1691, what are now the states of Sonora and Sinaloa were joined into an entity called the Provincias de Sonora, Ostimuri y Sinaloa. They would remain as such through the rest of the colonial period until 1823. At this time, there were about 1,300 Spanish settlers in the area. Colonization increased in the 18th century, especially from 1700 to 1767, when mineral deposits were discovered, especially in Álamos. This led to the establishment of a number of royally controlled mining camps, forcing many natives off their agricultural lands. Loss of said lands along the Yaqui and Mayo rivers led to native uprisings during this time. A major Seri rebellion took place on the coast area in 1725–1726, but the largest uprising was by the Yaquis and Mayos from 1740 to 1742 with the goal of expelling the Spanish. Part of the reason for the rebellion was that the Jesuits as well as the secular Spanish were exploiting the indigenous. This rebellion destroyed the reputation of the Jesuit mission system. Another Seri rebellion occurred in 1748, with Pima and Tohono O'otham support and lasted into the 1750s. This kept the settlement situation in disarray. With population of the Mexican north roughly split half indigenous and half Spanish, about one quarter of the indigenous population lived in Sonora alone. In 1767, the king of Spain expelled the Jesuits from Spanish controlled territories, ending the mission system.

== Independence ==
The Spanish colonial era was ended in Sonora by the Mexican War of Independence from 1810 to 1821; however, Sonora was not directly involved in the war. Independence came by way of decree. One positive development of independence is that it would allow for economic development. The former province of Sonora, Ostimuri y Sinaloa, was divided in 1823 to form the states of Sonora and Sinaloa, with the Sonoran capital in Ures. However, they would be reunited again in 1824 and would remain so until the 1830s, in spite of the fact that Sonora was declared a state by the 1824 Constitution of Mexico. Sonora became separate again in 1831, when it wrote its first state constitution, which put the capital in Hermosillo. In 1832, the capital was moved to Arizpe. The struggles between the Conservatives, who wanted a centralized government, and Liberals, who wanted a federalist system affected the state as well as the rest of the country during the 19th century. In 1835, a centralist government was instituted based on what were called the Bases Constitutionales (Constitutional Bases). They were followed by the Siete Leyes Constitutionales (Seven Constitutional Laws), which remained in effect until 1837. But in December of the same year, General José de Urrea proclaimed in Arizpe the re-establishment of the Constitution of 1824, initially supported by then Governor Manuel Gándara. However, for the rest of the century, Gándara and succeeding governors would support a centralized government, leading to political instability in the state. In 1838, the capital was moved back to Ures.

The fertile lands of the Mayo and Yaquis continued to attract outsiders during the 19th century. These were now Mexicans rather than Spanish, and later in the century it was a major draw for settlers and investors from the United States. However, the area received large numbers various European (esp. German, Italian and Russian); Middle Eastern (mainly Lebanese or Syrian Arab) and Chinese immigrants by the end of the 19th century, who would bring new forms of agriculture, mining, livestock, industrial processes, ironwork and textiles.

The Mexican–American War resulted in only one major military confrontation between Mexican and U.S. forces, but its consequences would be severe for the state. In October 1847, the battleship Cyane laid siege to Guaymas bay, resulting in U.S. control of this part of the coast from then until 1848. When the war ended, Sonora lost 339,370 hectares of its territory to the U.S. through the Treaty of Guadalupe Hidalgo. In addition, the war ruined the state's economy. Sonora would lose more territory in the 1850s, through the Treaty of La Mesilla or Gadsden Purchase. Before the war, Sonora was the largest entity in Mexico. The area's weakness immediately after the war made it susceptible to buccaneers such as William Walker, Gaston de Raousset-Boulbon and Henry Alexander Crabb who attacked Sonoran ports such as Guaymas and Caborca. However, most attacks were repelled. The economy would not begin recovery from the war until the late 1850s, then Ignacio Pesqueira became governor and attracted foreign investment to the state, especially in the mining sector as well as worked to create markets abroad for agricultural products.

During the French Intervention in Mexico, Sonora was invaded by French troops as part of their effort to install a monarch in Mexico under Maximilian I. The port of Guaymas was attacked by forces under Armando Castagny, forcing Mexican forces under Pesqueira and General Patoni to retreat north of the city. French troops attacked the Mexicans again at a place called La Pasión, again resulting in defeat for the Mexican resistance. The French were not defeated in the state until the Battle of Llanos de Ures in 1866 by Pesqueria, Jesús García Morales and Ángel Martínez. Shortly after this, the state's current constitution was written in 1871, and its capital would be permanently moved to Hermosillo.

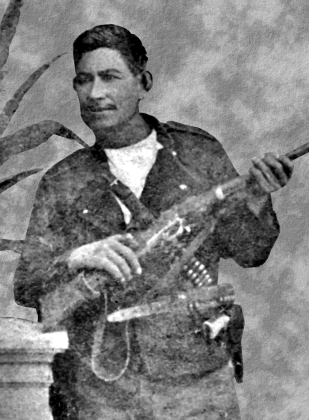
Cajemé, Yaqui resistance leader

During the regime of Porfirio Díaz from the 1800s to the 1900s, major economic changes were promoted. These changes promoted rapid economic growth, which would have far-reaching social and political consequences. Sonora along with the rest of the northern border states would rapidly increase in importance. Development of a rail system would integrate the state's economy into the national, and would also have the effect of greater federal control over all of Mexico's territory. After 1880, this rail system would pass on north into the United States, which is still an important part of bi-national economic relations. However, the changes also permitted foreigners and certain Mexicans to take over very large tracts of land in Mexico. In Sonora, Guillermo Andrade controlled 1,570,000 hectares, Manuel Peniche and American William Cornell Green had about 500,000. Foreign industry owners also tended to bring in foreign workers, including from Asia. Chinese immigration into Sonora would begin at this time, and the Chinese soon became an economic force as they built small business that would spread wherever there was economic development in the state.

The taking over of land for both agriculture and mining, placed renewed pressure on the Yaquis and other native peoples of Sonora. Yaqui resistance up to this point had given them fairly autonomous control of a portion of the state, and kept their agricultural system along the Yaqui River. Encroachment on this land led to uprisings and guerilla warfare by the Yaquis after 1887. By 1895, the federal and state governments began to violently repress the Yaquis and began to expel captured Yaquis to the plantations in Mexico's tropical south, especially the henequen plantations in the Yucatán. The Yaqui resistance continued into the 1900s, with the expulsions reaching a peak between 1904 and 1908, by which time about one quarter of this population had been sent out of state. Still more were forced to flee into Arizona.

== 20th century ==
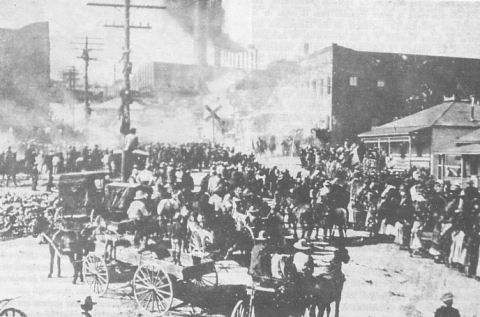
Image from the Cananea miners' strike 1906

The policies of the Díaz government not only caused resentment among the Yaquis, but among the rest of Sonora and the country. One of the preludes to the Mexican Revolution was the 1906 Cananea miner's strike, which sought negotiations with American mine owner William Greene, but he refused to meet with the approximately 2,000 strikers. The strike quickly turned violent when the miners tried to take control of the mine and exchanged gunfire. Greene appealed for federal troops, but when it was obvious they could not arrive in time, he appealed to Arizona and Sonoran government to allow Arizona volunteers in to help. This increased the scale of the violence. When Mexican federal troops arrived two days later, they put everything to a brutal end, with the suspected leaders of the strike executed. However, the strike would make the resentment against Diaz grow, not wane with more strikes in other areas.

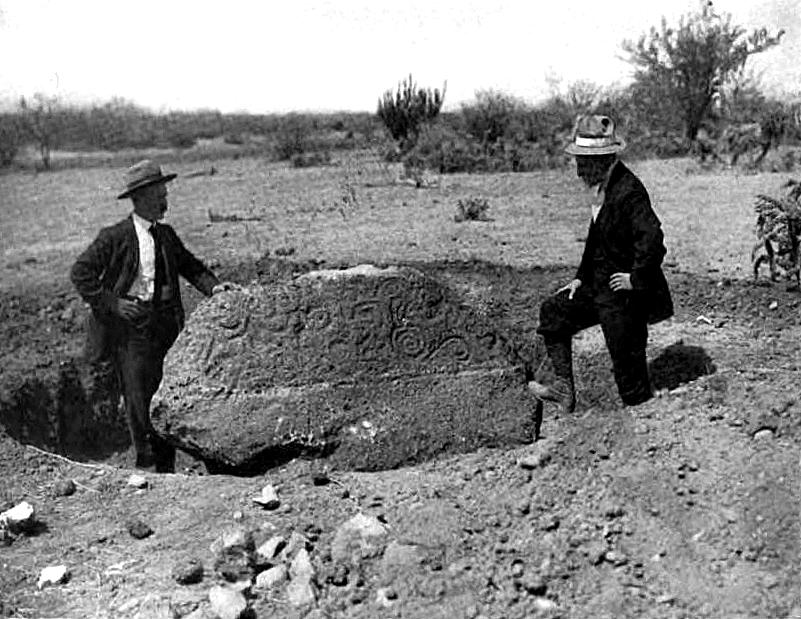
The Esperanza Stone. Found by Major Frederick Russell Burnham in the Yaqui Valley in 1908. Burnham left; Charles Frederick Holder, right

In 1906, Major Frederick Russell Burnham, a celebrated American scout and explorer, went to Sonora in search of mineral resources. While there he met the naturalist Dr. Charles Frederick Holder and the two men soon became associated with the early Yaqui River irrigation project and also made archeological discoveries of what they believed to be remnants of Maya civilization in the region, including the Esperanza Stone. Burnham reasoned that a dam could provide year-round water to rich alluvial soil in the valley; turning the region into one of the garden spots of the world and generate much needed electricity. He purchased water rights and some 300 acres (1.2 km^{2}) of land in this region and contacted an old friend from Africa, John Hays Hammond, who conducted his own studies and then purchased an additional 900,000 acres (3,600 km^{2}) of this land—an area the size of Rhode Island. In late 1910, the Mexican Revolution broke in earnest, and Díaz was quickly deposed. The rest of the war would determine who would take over next. The then governor of Coahuila, Venustiano Carranza, sought refuge in Sonora, and became one of the principal players during the rest of the war, with his main base of operations in Hermosillo. A number of the revolutionary leaders who joined Carranza in Sonora came not from peasant backgrounds but rather the lower middle class of hacienda-managers, shopkeepers, mill-workers, or schoolteachers, opposed to large-scale landowners and the Porfirian elite. Burnham led a team of 500 men in guarding mining properties owned by Hammond, J.P. Morgan, and the Guggenheims in the state of Sonora. However, the onset of the Mexican Revolution frustrated their plans. After Díaz was deposed, Carranza was in contention for power against Álvaro Obregón and others. The Yaquis joined with Álvaro Obregón's forces after 1913. In his case study of the American colonization scheme, Professor Bradford concluded: "a combination of Indian problems, the intricacies of the developing Mexican revolutionary process, and a less than clear-cut mandate from Washington, DC, served to bring the colony down."

By 1920, Carranza was president of Mexico, but found himself opposed by Obregón and others. Carranza tried to suppress political opposition in Sonora, which led to the Plan of Agua Prieta signed that year to formalize Obregón's and his allies' (primarily Abelardo L. Rodríguez, Benjamín Hill and Plutarco Elías Calles) resistance to Carranza. This movement soon came to dominate the political situation, but it caused widespread political instability. Obregón would succeed in deposing Carranza and becoming the next president of Mexico. For the 1924 presidential elections, Obregón chose Plutarco Elias Calles to succeed him, who was also a revolutionary leader from Sonora. This effectively ended the war, but hostilities had again destroyed the Sonoran economy. From 1920 to the early 1930s, four Sonorans would occupy the Mexican presidency Adolfo de la Huerta, Obregón, Calles and Rodríguez.

The Chinese first arrived at Guaymas in the late 19th century and congregated there and in Hermosillo. Over the following decades, they would move into growing communities such as Magdalena and Cananea. Rather than working in the fields, most started their own small businesses, networking among other Chinese. These business spanned a wide range of industries from manufacturing to retail sales of just about every type of merchandise. The Chinese in Sonora has not only become successful shopkeepers, they eventually came to control local small business in many areas of the state. By 1910, the Chinese population in Sonora was 4,486 out of a total population of 265,383, making them the largest foreign presence in the state, with only North Americans a close second at 3,164. Almost none were female as there were only 82 Chinese females in the entire country at the time. The Chinese population reached its peak in 1919 with 6,078 people, again with almost no Chinese women.

Resentment against Chinese success began quickly but rose sharply during the Mexican Revolution as many Chinese prospered despite the war and attacks targeted against them. The first organized anti-Chinese campaign in Sonora began in 1916 in Magdalena. A more serious campaign began in 1925, calling for their expulsion from the state. Mass expulsions were mostly carried out in Sonora and Sinaloa in part because of their large populations, but Chinese, often with their Mexican wives and children, were deported from all over the country. Some were deported directly to China but many others were forced to enter the United States through the border with Sonora, even though Chinese exclusion laws were still in effect there. Sonoran governor Rodolfo Elias Calles was responsible for the expulsion of most Chinese-Mexican families into U.S. territory. Despite the diplomatic problems this caused, Elias Calles did not stop expelling these families until he himself was expelled from Sonora. However, by that time almost all of Sonora's Chinese-Mexicans had disappeared. By the 1940 census, only 92 Chinese were still living in Sonora, with more than two-thirds of these having acquired Mexican citizenship. This had the unintended consequence of nearly collapsing the Sonoran economy.

The efforts at modernization and economic development begun in the Díaz period would continue through the Revolution and on through the rest of the 20th century. In the late 19th and early 20th century, the process of electrification greatly increased the demand for copper, which led to a boom in mining in Sonora and neighboring Arizona. Cananea grew very quickly from a village of 900 to a city of 20,000. It also led to a network of roads, railroads and other connections across the border. However, organized development of the state's agriculture was put on hold because of the Revolution, the Great Depression and other political upheavals.

In the 1930s, Sonora benefitted from a number of national policies aimed at developing the cities on the border with the United States and to build a number of dams to help develop agriculture and general water supply. Major agricultural reform was begun in the 1940s in the Mayo River area, when the delta was cleared of natural vegetation and made into farmland. Water for these farma was secure through the building of the Mocúzari Dam about 15 miles from Navojoa. When it was completed in 1951, there was a system of canals, wells and highways to support large scale agriculture for shipment to other places.

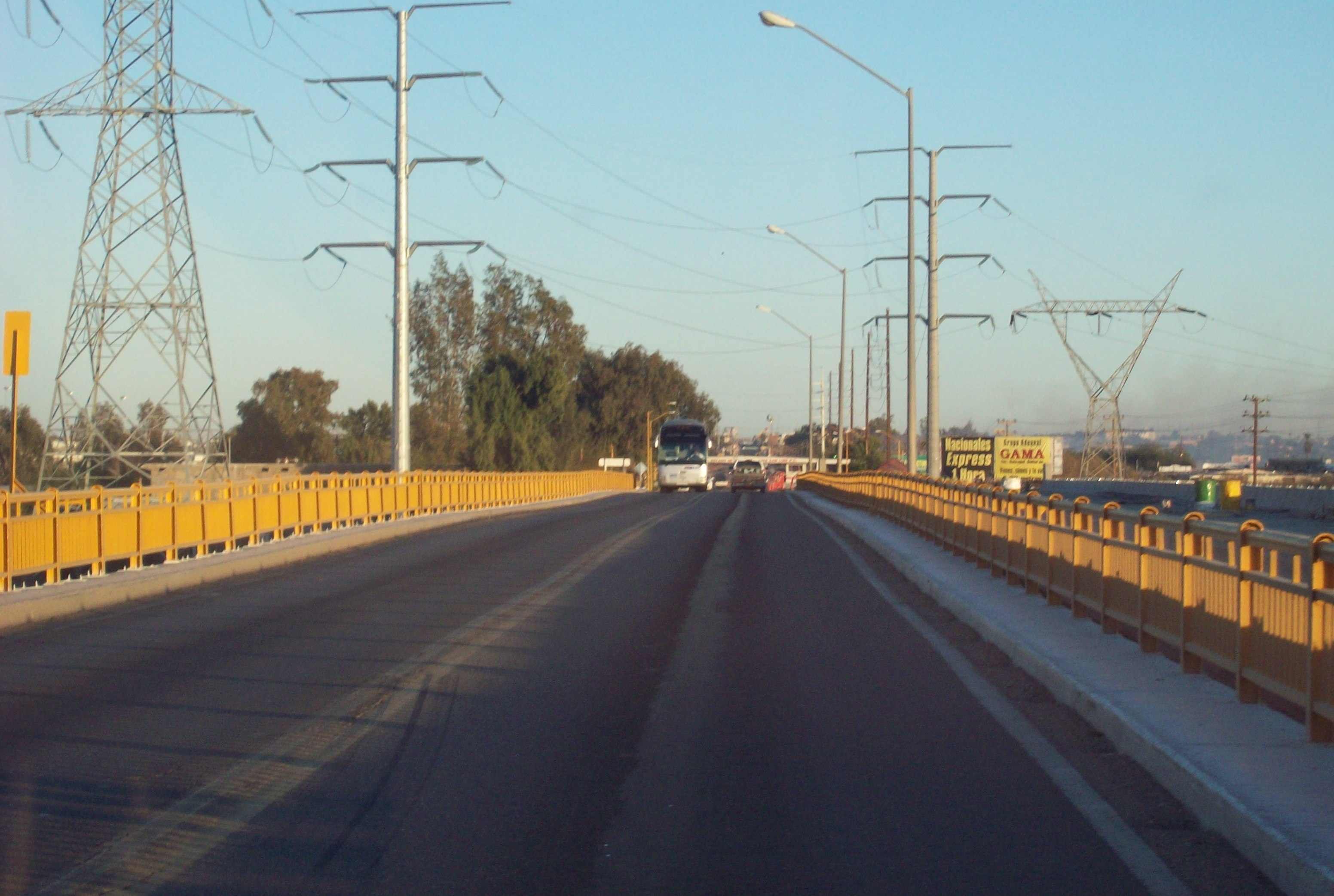
Bridge over the Colorado River in Sonora

In the last half of the 20th century, the state's population has grown and foreign investment has increased due to its strategic location along the border and its port of Guaymas. More than 200 international and domestic enterprises moved into the state. This has allowed for the development of modern infrastructure such as highways, ports and airports, making the state one of the best connected in the country. A bridge was built over the Colorado River to link Sonora with neighboring Baja California Norte in 1964. One important sector of the economy has been industry, culminating in the Ford automotive plant in Hermosillo and a number of assembly plants called maquiladoras on the border with the United States. One of the fastest growing sectors of the economy has been tourism, now one of the most important sectors of the economy, especially along the coast, with the number of visitors there increasing every year. This has led to a surge in hotel infrastructure, especially in Puerto Peñasco.

For most of the 20th century, Mexico was dominated by one political party, the Institutional Revolutionary Party, or PRI. Discontent with this one-party system became prominent in the northern states of Mexico, including Sonora. As early as 1967, a competing party, the National Action Party or PAN, won control of the city government of Sonora's capital, Hermosillo. PAN won important municipal victories in the state in 1983, which President de la Madrid (PRI) was forced to let stand, but he refused to officially recognize them. PAN's growing strength by the 1980s forced the PRI to nominate candidates who were similar to PAN, successful business executives who favored economic liberalization over traditional Mexican statism, preferred in the north of the country. PRI won the Sonoran gubernatorial race in 1985, but it was heavily contested with obvious problems of fraud. By the 1990s, PRI operatives caught manipulating election results were actually prosecuted by the Sonoran state attorney. This along with other events in the country would eventually lead to the end of the one party system when Vicente Fox was elected president in 2000. PAN has since dominated most of the north of the country, but Sonora would not have its first PAN governor until 2009, which the election of Guillermo Padrés Elías.

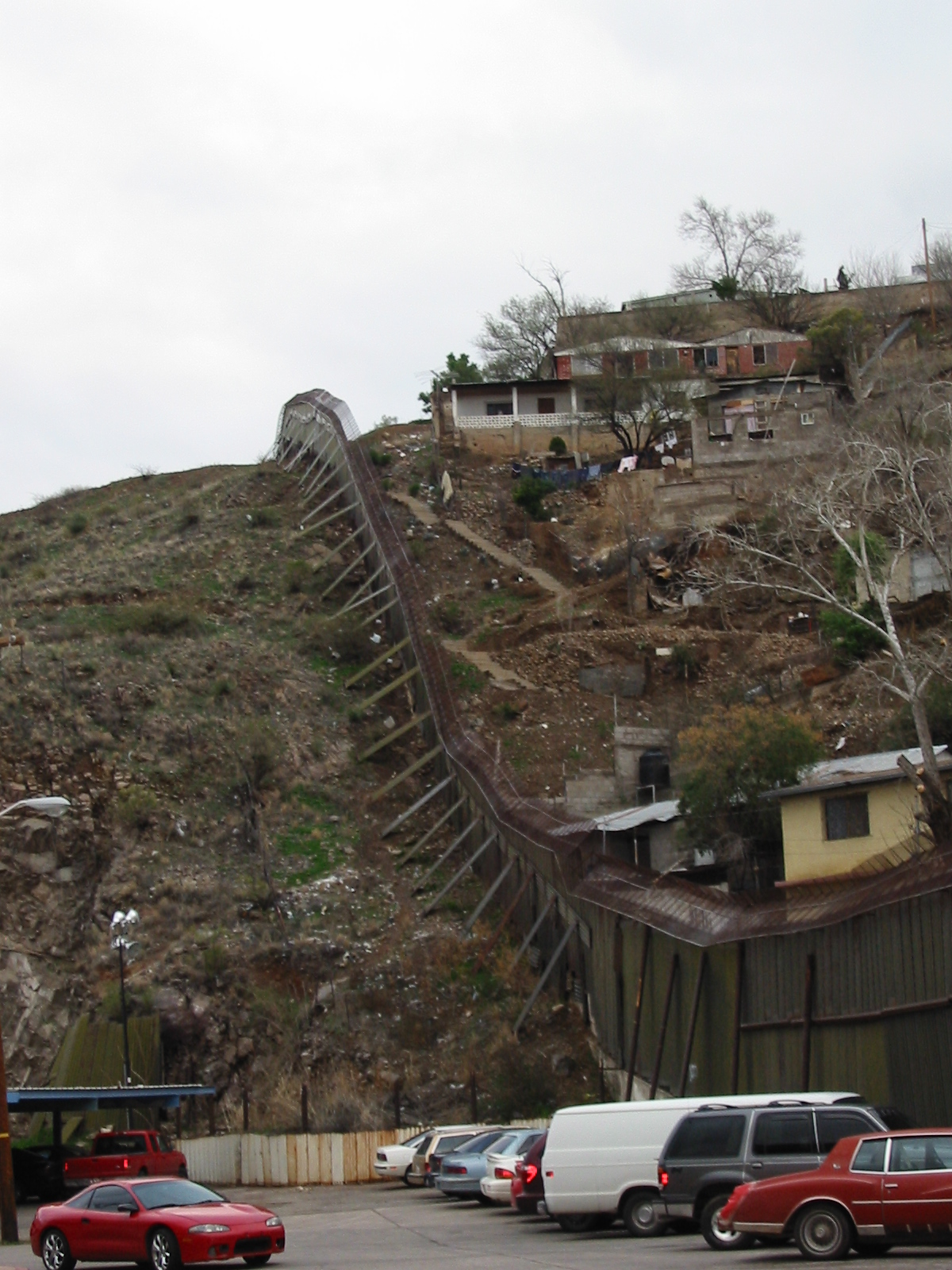
Barrier at the Nogales border

Sonora's border with Arizona has received more attention since 2000, with the increase of illegal border crossings and drug smuggling, especially in rural areas such as around Naco, which is one of the main routes into the United States. Starting in the 1990s, increased border patrols and the construction of corrugated metal and chain link fences in California and Texas dramatically cut illegal border crossing in these two states. This forced illegal immigrants into the more dangerous desert areas of Arizona and New Mexico, which have mostly seen rises in illegal crossings since then. Many migrants now come to the Arizona border between Agua Prieta and Nogales, with Naco as one of the preferred routes for "coyotes" (also called polleros or enganchadores) or smugglers who offer to take migrants across. There are migrant shelters and hotel in border towns catering to those waiting to the chance to make the crossing into Arizona. Providing lodging for migrants is a growing business in Naco and other border towns, where the rate is between 200 and 300 pesos per night per person. Many of these lodgings are filled with people who cannot cross the border. One example is the Hospedaje Santa María, which is a run-down, two-story building.

Forty five percent of the deaths of migrants occur on the Arizona side of the border. According to Arizonan authorities, 2010 was a record year for deaths in Arizona for people crossing illegally from Sonora, with the bodies of 252 crossers found in the deserts between the New Mexico and California borders. This broke the previous record of 234 in 2007, with nearly 2,000 found in this area since 2001. However, Mexican officials state that the figures are higher, with over four hundred dying in Arizona deserts in 2005 alone. In 2006, Mexican officials began to distribute maps of Arizona to Mexicans gathered in Sonoran border town with the intention of crossing illegally. The Mexican government stated the reason for the maps was to help Mexican avoid dangerous areas that have caused deaths from the desert's heat.

This migration and drug smuggling problem has affected most border towns. Many people make a living by catering to migrants or working as "coyote" guides. Mexicans and others either looking to cross, or those recently deported crowd these towns. Some decide to head to the local bus station to return home, but many others decide to stay on the Sonoran border, working to earn money for another attempt. These workers put a strain on insufficient municipal medical services. The walls, which have shut down much of the illegal crossings into Texas and California, have also been built on parts of the Arizona border, especially between towns such as the two Nacos and the two Nogaleses. The wall in Naco is four meters high and made of steel. It currently extends 7.4 km, but there are plans to extend it another 40 km. Security here was further tightened after 11 September 2001. The Border Patrol credits the wall and better surveillance technology with cutting the number of captured border crossers near Naco by half in 2006. People on both sides of the wall have mixed feelings about it.

Violence connected to drug smuggling on the border and in Mexico in general has caused problems with tourism, an important segment of the economy in Sonora as in the rest of the country. Federal troops have been stationed here due to the violence, which has the population divided. While the security they can provide is welcome, there is concern about the violation of human rights. In 2005, the state began advertising campaigns to reassure Arizonans that it is safe to cross the border.

== Bibliography ==
- Bradford, Richard H. (May 1988). "John Hays Hammond: For God and Yale in Mexico". The Journal of Southern History. Southern Historical Meeting. The Fifty-Third Annual Meeting. 54 (2). JSTOR 2209400.
- Fort, Charles; Liveright, Horace (1919). The Book of the Damned. Horace Liveright. chap. XI. ISBN 978-1-870870-53-5.
- Hammond, John Hays (1935). The Autobiography of John Hays Hammond. New York: Farrar & Rinehart. ISBN 978-0-405-05913-1.
- "Guarding Morgan Mines: Burnham's Force also at Guggenheim Properties is report" (PDF). The New York Times. April 23, 1912. ISSN 0362-4331.
- Holder, Charles (1910). "The Esperanza Stone". Scientific American. 103 (11): 196. doi:10.1038/scientificamerican09101910-196.
