= Warachikuy =

Andean coming of age rituals

During the Inca Empire Warachikuy (Quechua) was a ceremony where young men, after undergoing various tests of skill and valor, could receive the official status of an adult man. Today Warachikuy is still an important festival which represents the Andean cultural heritage. The celebrations are held annually at the archaeological site of Sacsayhuamán near Cusco on the third Sunday of September. They include rites, warlike dances, battles like ch'iyar jaqhi (Aymara chiyara black, jaqhi cliff, "black cliff", Hispanicized chiaraje) and competitions.

== See also ==
- Inti Raymi
