= Yana Khuchilla =

Mountain in Peru

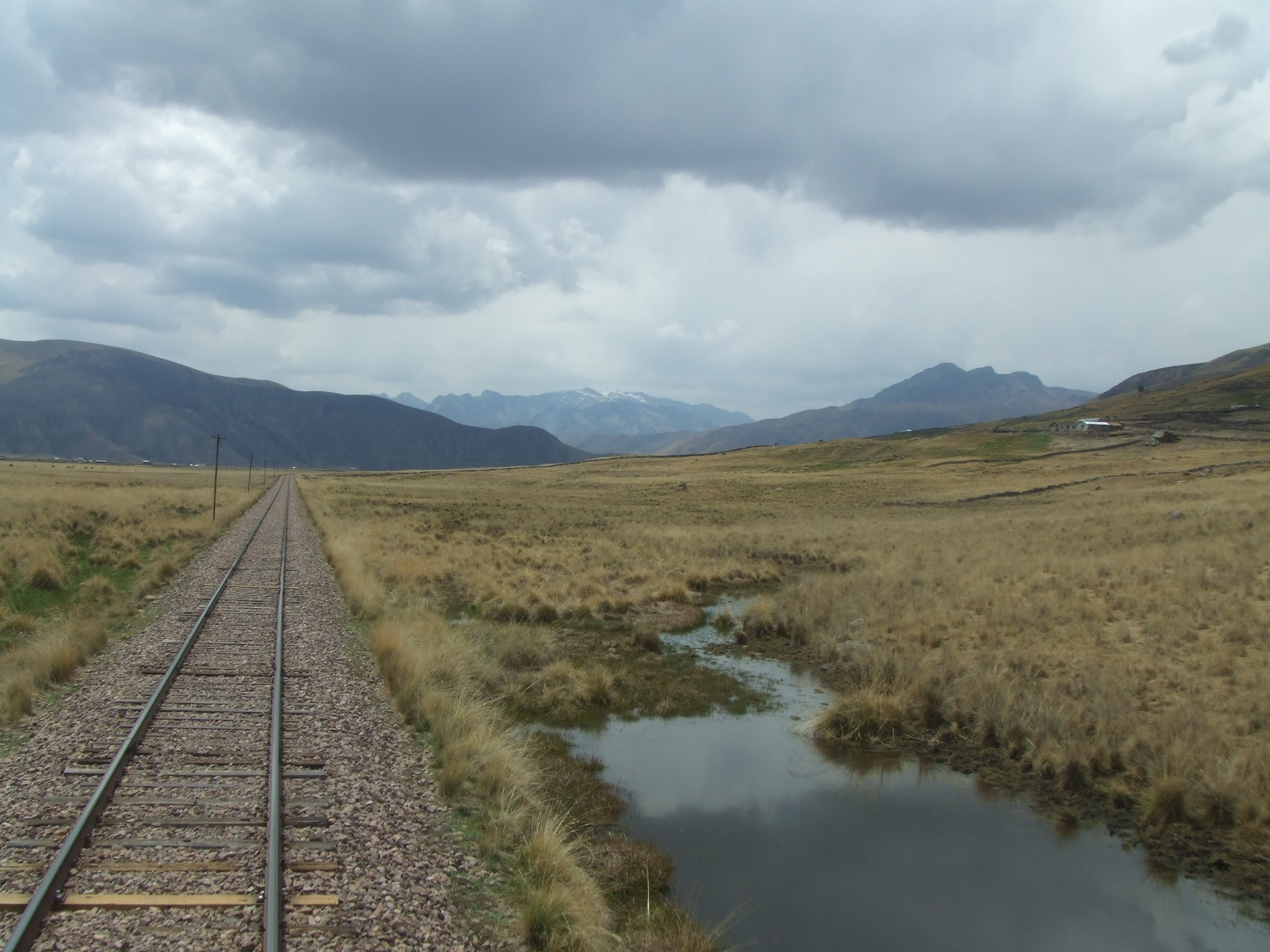
- Yana Khuchilla (center) as seen from the southwest

Highest point
- Elevation: 5,472 m (17,953 ft)
- Coordinates: 14°26′S 70°58′W

Geography
- Location within Peru
- Location: Peru, Puno Region
- Parent range: Andes, La Raya

Yana Khuchilla (Quechua, Hispanicized spelling Yana Cuchilla) is a mountain in the La Raya mountain range in the Andes of Peru, about 5,472 metres (17,953 ft) high. It is situated in the Puno Region, Melgar Province, Santa Rosa District. Yana Khuchilla lies northeast of the La Raya Pass, near the mountain Chimpulla.
