= Takanakuy =

Annual practice in Chumbivilcas Province, Peru, on 25 December

- Observed by: Residents of Chumbivilcas Province
- Type: Indigenous tradition
- Observances: Dancing, fighting
- Date: 25 December
- Next time: 25 December 2025

Takanakuy (Quechua for "to hit each other") is an annual established practice of fighting fellow community members held on 25 December, by the inhabitants of Chumbivilcas Province, near Cuzco, in Peru. The practice started in Santo Tomás, the capital of Chumbivilcas, and subsequently spread to other villages and cities, the prominent ones being Cuzco and Lima. The festival consists of dancing and of individuals fighting each other to settle old conflicts.

Some locals claim to obtain several social benefits from the tradition, while others criticize it. Those in favor claim that public brawling offers an alternative method to resolve conflict and create a peaceful society. It has been variously thought of by academics as a rite, ritual or an incipient sport.

The huaylía de Chumbivilcas, sung by women, is the music traditionally played at the takanakuy fights.

== Customs ==
=== Dress ===
There are five types of traditional characters portrayed during the ceremony that have different roles based on Andean cultural symbols. The majority of the dress is based on traditional horse-riding gear and brightly colored Peruvian ski masks, which are characteristic of the specific regional area. The ski masks are not all the same: they have different colors, different designs, and different textile patterns to make money.

Majeno

Majenos are the most basic level of dress adorning the traditional horse riding gear. A majeta is a person who lives near the Majes River in the Andes and the attire of this character is based on that. Wool horse-riding pants, a leather cap, a harrington-like traditional Peruvian jacket, hollowed out bull's horn for the alcohol. The specific Peruvian ski mask is called uyach'ullu, which has abstract symbolic associations and displays four colors (red, green, yellow, and white) which are supposed to represent the four quadrants of the universe. The main purpose of the ski mask however is to conceal the identity of the fighters to prevent the tensions and animosities lingering into the next year.

Quarawatanna

Majeta dress with the addition of a leather biker jacket, long leather cowboy chaps, and either a dead bird or a deer skull on top of the head. The majority of the young individuals in the indigenous communities pick this type of fighter due to its intimidation factor.

Negro

Aspects of this dress attempt to portray a slave master during the colonial periods; for example, knee-high leather boots, fancy worsted pants, a nice shirt and waistcoat, a silk embroidered cape in pink or baby blue, and a cardboard crown with shiny wrapping paper on the sides and a star at the top. Then the character has to dance in circles like a rooster, which is the character's associated spirit animal. This type of outfit was traditionally reserved for the wealthy men in town and served in contrast to the Majeno's drunk archetype. Over time, the character became less the rich man's costume than the top fighters'.

Qara Capa or Langosta

The Peruvian word langosta translates to locust, and this costume is made to resemble one due to a locust swarm in the 1940s destroying much of Chumbivilca's crops. The outfit is made from a bright colored raincoat and pants meant to mimic the shiny abdomen of the locust, and sometimes worn with a plastic miner's helmet or a dead bird tied around the neck.

Q'ara Gallo

This specific fighter wears no distinct type of dress attributed to Andean culture but still takes part in the procession but not the ceremonious fighting. The dress of Q'ara Gallo is "improvised tending to the extravagant".

=== Fighting ===
The procession to the fighting site starts with a high-pitched falsetto, a method of voice production used by male singers, especially tenors, to sing notes higher than their normal range, through the streets. The procession is family oriented as a preparation for the young children who will see the violent fights later on in the day. Children also dress up for the occasion, usually resembling their father's character.

The purpose of the fighting is to settle conflicts with an individual, friend, family member or to settle territorial conflicts that have come up throughout the year. The style of fighting used during the celebration is relatively similar to martial arts, which involves kicking, punching, and quickness of their movements.

Those fighting call out their opponents by their first and last name. They then proceed to the center of the circle and start the fight. The men fighting must wrap their hands with cloth before the fight. Biting, hitting those on the ground, or pulling hair is not allowed during the fight. The winner is selected based upon a knockout or intervention by the official. There are amateur officials who carry whips in order to keep the crowd under control. At the start and at the end of the fight, the opponents must shake hands or give each other a hug.

If the loser of the fight disagrees with the outcome, he or she can appeal for another fight. This type of fighting also exemplifies one's level of manhood in the community of Santo Tomás.

=== Music ===
The type of music played during the ceremony is known as waylilla or wayliya. This music originated in 1960 as part of the Taki Unquy ideological resistance movement. The lyrics in waylilla center around the repeal of authority, confrontation, and freedom. The chorus is repeated in a loop endlessly throughout the procession to the town's center. Indigenous people believe that dancing waylilla will transform them into a new person.

=== Alcohol ===
There are preliminary drinking days before the celebration. On the day of the celebration the people of the community get together, have breakfast at the local church and drink before the fighting starts. After the fight, fighters will drink more alcohol to numb the pain endured during the fight.

=== Location ===
The main event happens in the Peruvian Andes in the province of Chumbivilcas which has a population of approximately 300, but during the events about 3,000 gather to watch the fights. There is a second event that takes place the day after Christmas in the village of Llique, located in the province of Cuzco. This is where the best fighters of multiple indigenous villages congregate the strongest men, women, and even children for fist fights. There is no police, no military service and no government service in these communities.

Urban settings such as Cuzco and Lima have claimed to engage in this practice as a pretext for brawls.

=== Date ===
The established indigenous practice takes place on 25 December. A teacher from the local indigenous community of Santo Tomás points to the significance of having such violent ceremony on a perceived peaceful day. "There's social meaning to it. Precisely that of settling conflicts, and also as a form of social catharsis."

== Contemporary movement ==
Although the government of Lima has tried to eradicate Takanakuy, the practice has diffused into urban areas such as Cuzco and Lima. People of non-indigenous descent are now taking part in this originally indigenous cultural custom. This practice has crossed class barriers and people of middle and upper-middle class are now also taking part of the celebration. There is a similar event in Bolivia called Tinku; the event takes place in May in the village of Potosí. This practice is very similar to Takanakuy; however, the women rarely fight, and the fights between men are large brawls.

Controversy

This practice has been criticized as barbaric by numerous commentators. Others have decried it as lacking justice, since those more able at fighting can gain legal advantages regardless of their merit in disputes. Numerous injuries are known to occur.

== See also ==
- Ch'iyar Jaqhi
- Tinku
- Festivus – a popular American comedy pseudo-holiday that includes conflict and combat: "Airing of grievances" + "feats of strength" (wrestling)
