= Livitaca District =

Coordinates: 14.3144°S 71.6887°W

Livitaca
- District
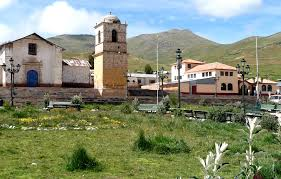
- Livitaca District
- Interactive map of Livitaca
- Country: Peru
- Region: Cusco
- Province: Chumbivilcas
- Founded: January 2, 1857
- Capital: Livitaca

Government
  - Mayor: Cirilo Huacho Huamaní

Area
  - Total: 758.2 km^{2} (292.7 sq mi)
- Elevation: 3,741 m (12,274 ft)

Population (2005 census)
  - Total: 11,403
  - Density: 15.04/km^{2} (38.95/sq mi)
- Time zone: UTC-5 (PET)
- UBIGEO: 080705

Livitaca District is one of eight districts of the Chumbivilcas Province in Peru.

== Geography ==
One of the highest peaks of the district is Waylla Apachita at approximately 4,800 m (15,700 ft). Other mountains are listed below:

- Amayani
- Chunta
- Chuqu Q'awa
- Chhullu
- Chhullu Pata
- Hatun Urqu
- Inti Kancha
- Kunka Q'asa
- Kuntur Sallana
- Kuntur Sayana
- Luntuni
- Machu Qucha
- Piki Qaqa
- Pilluni
- Puka Puka
- Pukara
- Qullpa Pukyu
- Qura
- Saywa Pata
- Siwinta
- Tarujani
- Tika Pallana
- Tuqtu
- Urquchiri
- Wallu Wallu
- Wanaku
- Waywa Qalla
- Willkani

== Ethnic groups ==
The people in the district are mainly indigenous citizens of Quechua descent. Quechua is the language which the majority of the population (96.04%) learnt to speak in childhood, 3.68% of the residents started speaking using the Spanish language (2007 Peru Census).

== See also ==
- Tupay Tuqtu
