= Kuntur Quta =

Mountain in Peru

- Location within Peru

Highest point
- Elevation: 5,425 m (17,799 ft)
- Coordinates: 14°21′29″S 71°01′33″W

Geography
- Location: Peru, Cusco Region, Canchis Province
- Parent range: Andes, La Raya

Kuntur Quta (Aymara kunturi condor, quta lake, -ni a suffix to indicate ownership, "condor lake", Hispanicized spelling Condorcota) is a 5,425-metre-high (17,799 ft) mountain in the La Raya mountain range in the Andes of Peru. It is located in the Cusco Region, Canchis Province, Marangani District. Kuntur Quta lies near the La Raya pass, northwest of Qillqa and north of Qillqa Lake. It is situated at the Qillqa valley whose stream flows to the Willkanuta River.
