= Yanaoca District =

Coordinates: 14.2186°S 71.4303°W

Yanaoca Yana Uqa
- District
- Location of Yanaoca in the Canas province
- Country: Peru
- Region: Cusco
- Province: Canas
- Founded: August 29, 1834
- Capital: Yanaoca

Government
  - Mayor: Juan Francisco Melendez Nina (2007)

Area
  - Total: 292.97 km^{2} (113.12 sq mi)
- Elevation: 3,913 m (12,838 ft)

Population (2005 census)
  - Total: 10,533
  - Density: 35.952/km^{2} (93.117/sq mi)
- Time zone: UTC-5 (PET)
- UBIGEO: 080501

Yanaoca District is one of eight districts in the Canas Province in Peru. Its seat is Yanaoca.

== Geography ==
One of the highest peaks of the district is Yawri Kunka at approximately 4,400 m (14,400 ft). Other mountains are listed below:

- Aqu Saya
- Ch'uwaña
- Hatun Urqu
- Kuntur Sinqa
- Mik'aya
- Pukara
- Qaqa
- Q'ululu Kinray
- Tika Pallana
- Waqutu
- Yana Urqu
- Yawri Kunka

== Ethnic groups ==
The people in the district are mainly indigenous citizens of Quechua descent. Quechua is the language which the majority of the population (88.77%) learnt to speak in childhood, 10.90% of the residents started speaking using the Spanish language (2007 Peru Census).
