= Qillqa (Cusco) =

Mountain in Peru

- Location within Peru

Highest point
- Elevation: 5,360 m (17,590 ft)
- Coordinates: 14°22′01″S 71°00′42″W

Geography
- Location: Peru, Cusco Region, Canchis Province
- Parent range: Andes, La Raya

Qillqa (Quechua for writing (the act and art of writing) Hispanicized spelling Quillca) is a 5,360-metre-high (17,585 ft) mountain in the La Raya mountain range in the Andes of Peru. It is located in the Cusco Region, Canchis Province, Marangani District.

Southwest of the mountain there is also a lake named Qillqa with an intermittent stream of the same name. The stream is a right affluent of the Willkanuta River.
