= Langui District =

Coordinates: 14.4326°S 71.2727°W

Langui
- District
- Location of Langui in the Canas province
- Country: Peru
- Region: Cusco
- Province: Canas
- Capital: Langui

Government
  - Mayor: Dimas Braulio Esquivel Caballero (2007)

Area
  - Total: 187.1 km^{2} (72.2 sq mi)
- Elevation: 3,969 m (13,022 ft)

Population (2005 census)
  - Total: 3,032
  - Density: 16.21/km^{2} (41.97/sq mi)
- Time zone: UTC-5 (PET)
- UBIGEO: 080504

Langui District is one of eight districts in the Canas Province in Peru. Its seat is the village of Langui.

== Geography ==
One of the highest peaks of the district is Yana Urqu at approximately 4,800 m (15,700 ft). Other mountains are listed below:

- Anta Qalla
- Ch'uwaña
- Llallawi
- Lluqu
- Palumani
- Pirwa
- Sawil Chunta
- Yawri Kunka

== Ethnic groups ==
The people in the district are mainly indigenous citizens of Quechua descent. Quechua is the language which the majority of the population (82.83%) learnt to speak in childhood, 16.81% of the residents started speaking using the Spanish language (2007 Peru Census).
