= Cunurana (Melgar) =

Mountain in Peru

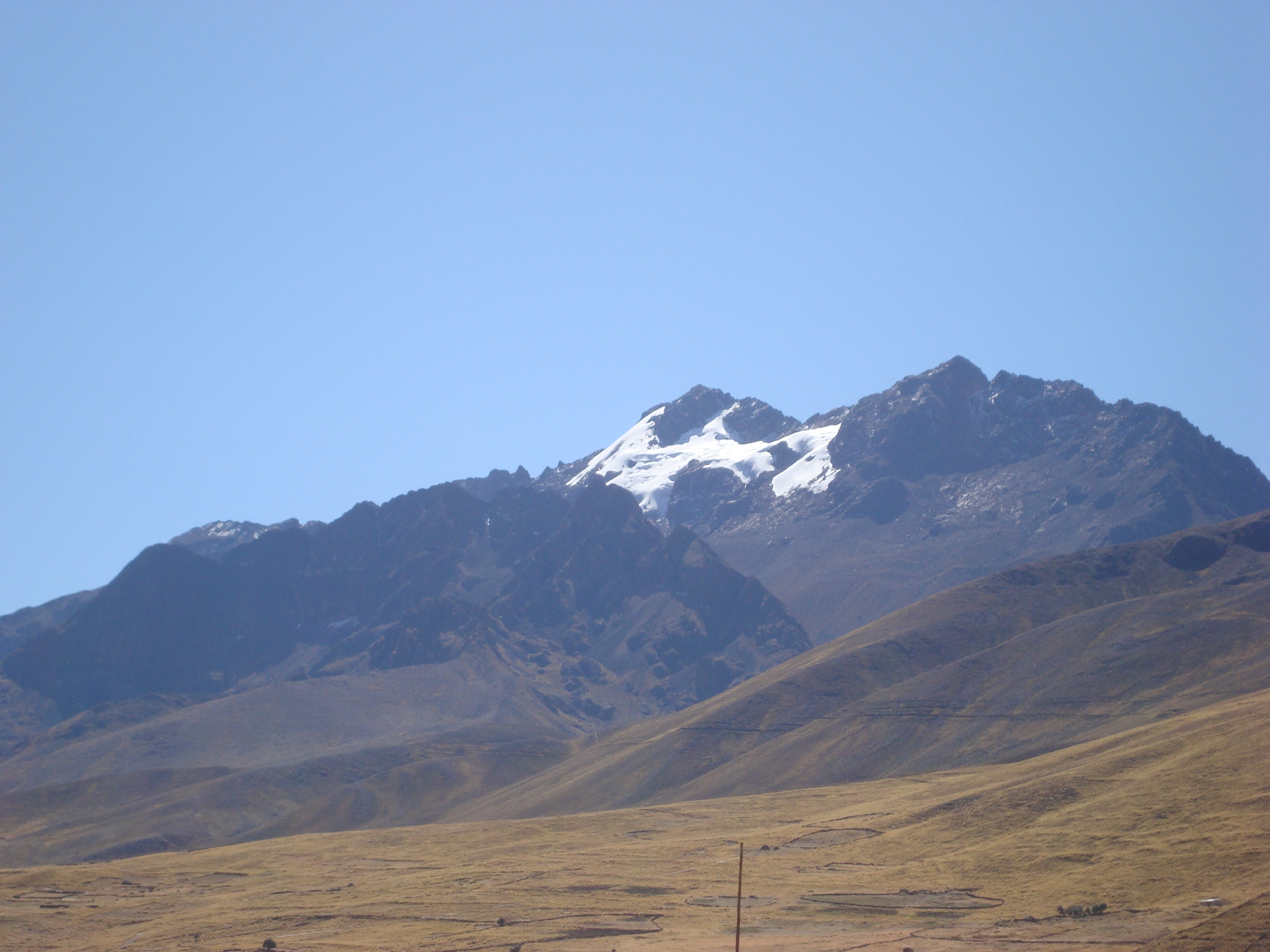
- Cunurana as seen from Santa Rosa

Highest point
- Elevation: 5,420 m (17,780 ft)
- Coordinates: 14°32′56″S 70°49′55″W

Geography
- Location within Peru
- Location: Peru, Puno Region
- Parent range: Andes, La Raya

Cunurana (possibly from Aymara for a variety of potato of the qhini group) is a mountain in the La Raya mountain range in the Andes of Peru, about 5,420 metres (17,782 ft) high. It is situated in the Puno Region, Melgar Province, Santa Rosa District. Cunurana lies south east of La Raya mountain pass near the road and railway that connect Cusco and Juliaca.
