= Chimboya =

Mountain in Peru

- Jinchurusi, Iruna, Willkanuta
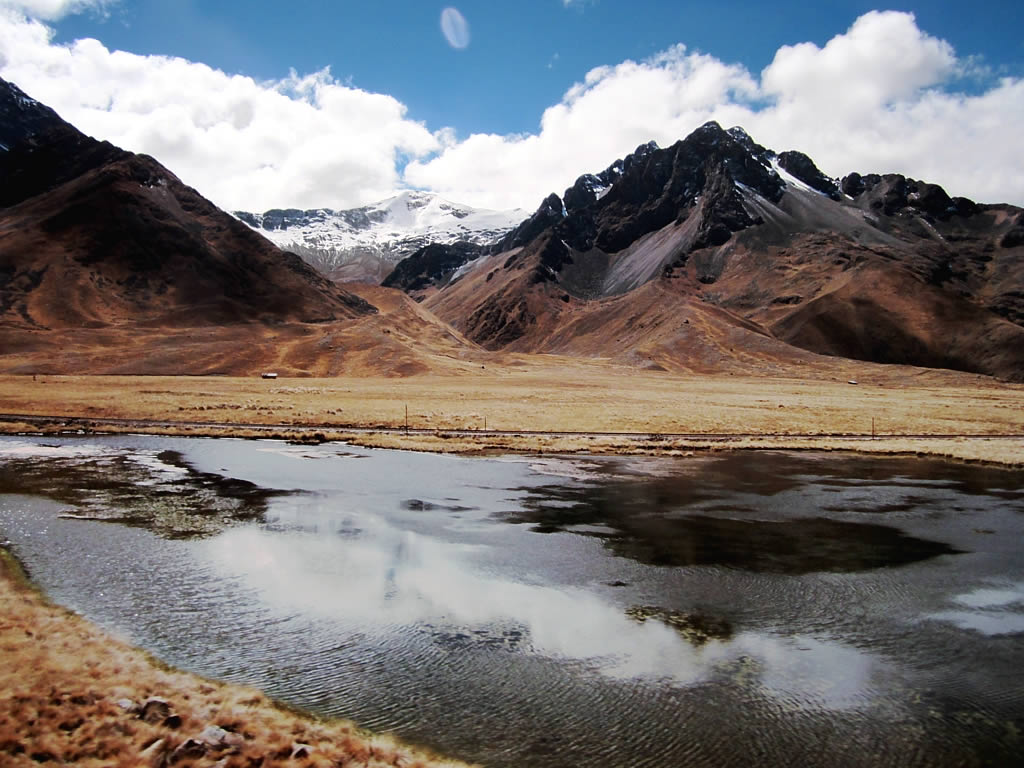
- Chimboya, the snow-covered mountain in the background, as seen from a small lake near the La Raya pass

Highest point
- Elevation: 5,489 m (18,009 ft)
- Coordinates: 14°26′37″S 70°57′44″W

Geography
- Location within Peru
- Location: Peru, Puno Region - Cusco Region
- Parent range: Andes, La Raya

Chimboya or Chimbolla (possibly from Aymara Chimpuya, Chimpulla), Inchurusi (Jinchurusi), Iruna or Vilcanota (Willkanuta) is a mountain in the La Raya mountain range in the Andes of Peru, about 5,489 metres (18,009 ft) high. It is situated in the Cusco Region, Canas Province, Layo District and in the Puno Region, Melgar Province, Santa Rosa District. Chimboya lies northeast of the La Raya Pass and the mountain Kunka and southeast of the mountain Yana Khuchilla.

== Images ==
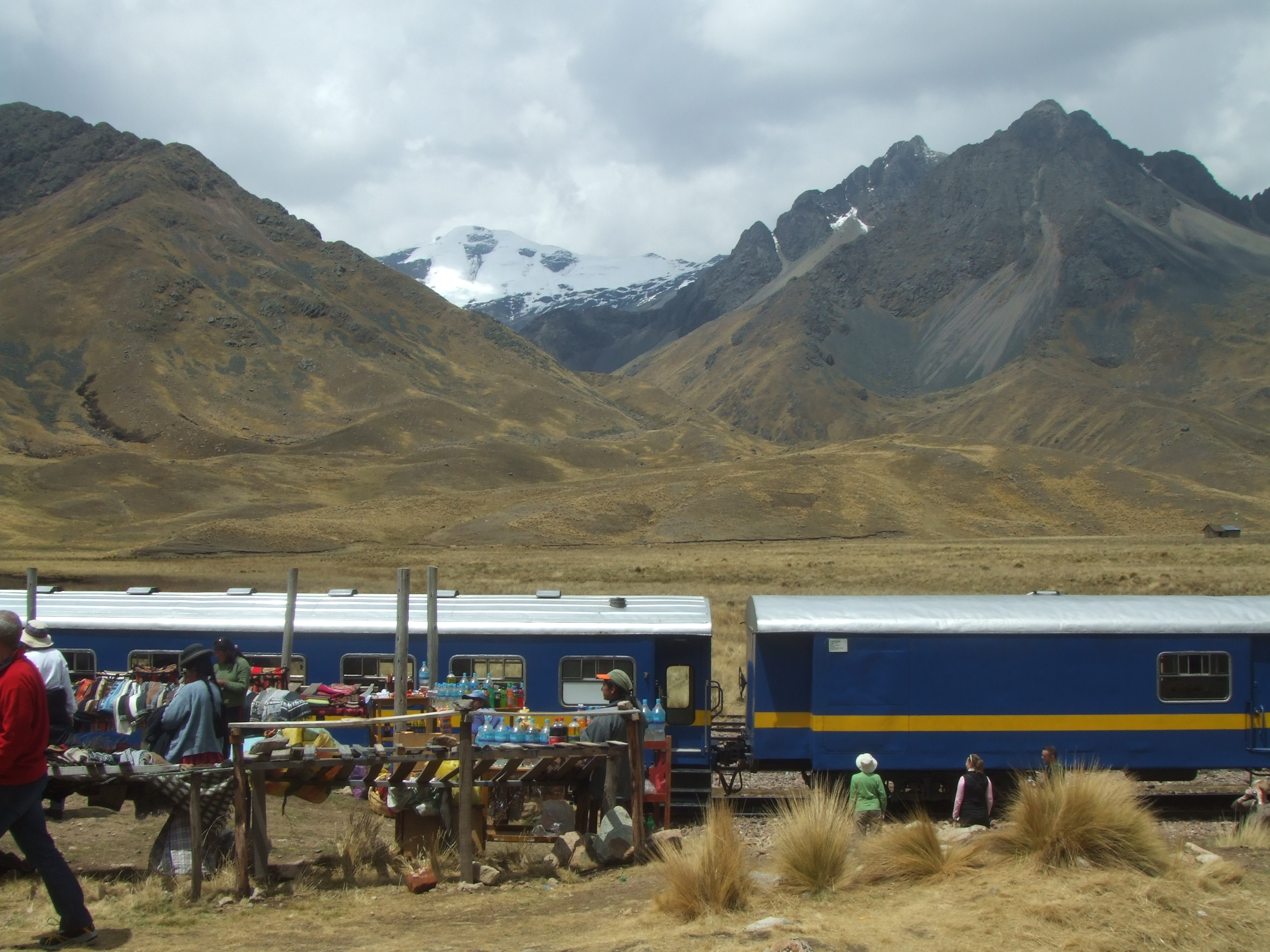
The train Belmond Andean Explorer at La Raya Station with market stalls and the mountain Chimboya in the background
