= Lake Langui Layo =

Lake in Peru

- Location within Peru
- Coordinates: 14°29′33″S 71°10′57″W
- Basin countries: Peru

Lake Langui Layo is a lake in Peru.

== See also ==
- List of lakes of Peru
