= La Raya mountain range =

Mountain range in Peru

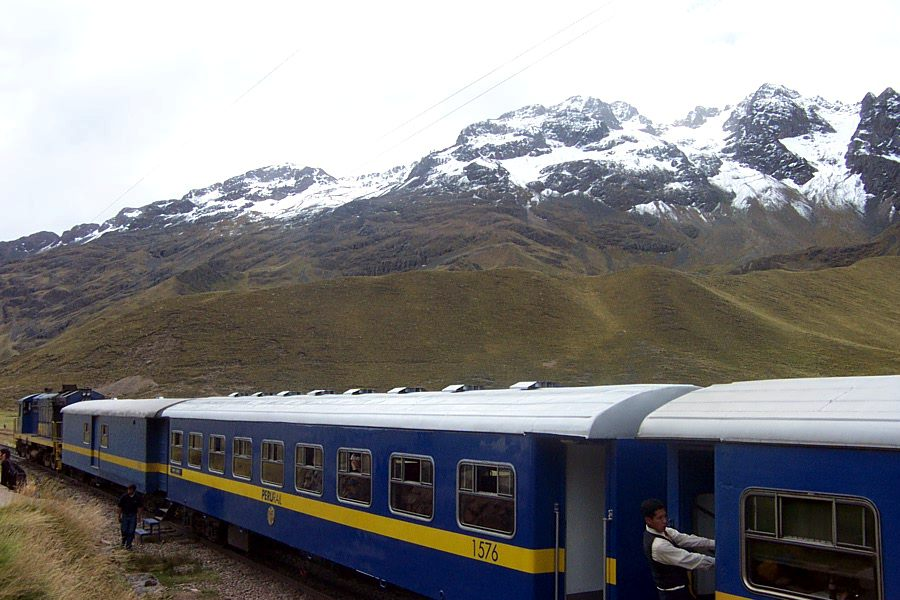
- The train from Puno to Cusco at the La Raya Pass at 4,313 m (14,150 ft)

Dimensions
- Length: 10 km (6.2 mi) NE-SW

Geography
- Country: Peru
- Region(s): Cusco Region, Puno Region
- Parent range: Andes

The La Raya mountain range (Spanish for the line, the limits, the border) is situated in the Andes of Peru. It extends in a northeasterly direction approximately between 14º 20’ and 14º 33’S and 70º 57’ and 71º 02’W for about 10 km. It is located in the Cusco Region as well as in the Puno Region, northwest of the Peruvian Altiplano and Lake Titicaca, near the La Raya pass.

== Mountains ==
One of the highest peaks of the range is Chimpulla (5,489 metres (18,009 ft)). Other mountains are listed below:

- Yana Khuchilla, 5,472 m (17,953 ft)
- Chinchina, 5,463 m (17,923 ft)
- Muskaya, 5,414 m (17,762 ft)
- Kuntur Quta, 5,425 m (17,799 ft)
- Qillqa, 5,360 m (17,590 ft)
- Awkar Utaña, 5,310 m (17,420 ft)
- Huch'uy K'uchu, 5,300 m (17,400 ft)
- Hatun Awkara, 5,230 m (17,160 ft)
- Kunka, 5,200 m (17,100 ft)
- Wila Quta, 5,200 m (17,100 ft)
- Yanaqucha, 5,105 m (16,749 ft)
- Mamaniri, 5,077 m (16,657 ft)
- Qullqini, 5,025 m (16,486 ft)
- Chawpi Tiyana, 5,000 m (16,000 ft)
- Hatun Ichhuna Kunka, 5,000 m (16,000 ft)
- Huch'uy Awkara, 5,000 m (16,000 ft)
- Puka Urqu, 5,000 m (16,000 ft)
- Taruja Marka, 5,000 m (16,000 ft)
- Yana Ranra, 5,000 m (16,000 ft)
- Hatun Wasi, 4,800 m (15,700 ft)
- Inka Kancha, 4,800 m (15,700 ft)
- Ñiq'i Quta, 4,800 m (15,700 ft)
- Silluta, 4,800 m (15,700 ft)
- Yaritani, 4,800 m (15,700 ft)

== See also ==
- PeruRail
