= Analí Márquez =

Peruvian lawyer and politician (born 1988)

First Vice President of the Chamber of Deputies
- Incumbent
- Assumed office 26 July 2026
- President: Óscar Reto
- Preceded by: Fernando Rospigliosi (Note: as First Vice President of the Congress of the Republic)

Member of the Chamber of Deputies
- Incumbent
- Assumed office 26 July 2026
- Constituency: Cusco

Personal details
- Born: Analí Márquez Huanca; 10 October 1988 (age 38) Santo Tomás, Chumbivilcas, Peru
- Citizenship: Peru
- Party: JP (since 2022); RUNA (2020–2021)
- Education: Alas Peruanas University
- Profession: Lawyer · politician

Analí Márquez Huanca (born 10 October 1988) is a Peruvian lawyer and politician. She is the first-vice president and a member of the Chamber of Deputies of Peru for Cusco. She was a candidate for first-vice president in the 2026 Peruvian general election.

== Biography ==
Márquez was born on 10 October 1988, in the district of Santo Tomás, the capital of Chumbivilcas Province in the Department of Cusco, southern Peru. She pursued her higher education at the now-defunct Alas Peruanas University (UAP), earning a Bachelor of Laws degree in May 2015. She later transferred to the Inca Garcilaso de la Vega University in Lima, where she qualified as a lawyer in December 2016. Subsequently, in April 2020, she enrolled in a master's program in public management at César Vallejo University, graduating in August 2021.

=== Professional career ===
In 2018, she worked for a few months as an administrative assistant to the municipal management at the Provincial Municipality of Chumbivilcas. According to her official disclosures, in 2019, she served for a period in the Municipal Office for the Defense of Children and Adolescents (DEMUNA) of the Llusco District Municipality. Following her entry into politics, she served as an official in the DEMUNA office at the Quiñota District Municipality between 2020 and 2021. Later, from 2023 to 2024, she was hired as a specialist in productive, environmental, and social promotion by the Megantoni District Municipality in Cusco. Most recently, she disclosed having worked for a few months in 2025 providing legal advisory services under service contracts for the Lurigancho-Chosica District Municipality. Her tenure during this final period drew scrutiny following reports that several of the legal briefs she submitted were deficient, consisting of only a single page.

== Political career ==
=== National United Renaissance ===
In the 2020 extraordinary parliamentary elections, she ran for a seat in Congress representing Cusco under the National United Renaissance (Renacimiento Unido Nacional) party. She was not elected, receiving 5,125 valid votes. In December 2021, the National Office of Electoral Processes (ONPE) initiated an administrative sanctioning procedure through Management Resolution No. RG-003014-2021-GSFP due to her failure to submit financial disclosures regarding campaign contributions, income, and expenditures from the election cycle.

=== Together for Peru ===
On 5 January 2022, she registered as a member of the Together for Peru (Juntos por el Perú) party ahead of the electoral process later that year. She subsequently ran as the party's candidate for the provincial mayoralty of Chumbivilcas in the 2022 regional and municipal elections. She was not elected, obtaining 1.861% of the valid votes.

She faced public scrutiny after receiving 42,000 PEN through seven service contracts (órdenes de servicio) between April and October 2025 from the Lurigancho-Chosica District Municipality. The municipality was led by Mayor Oswaldo Vargas Cuéllar, a fellow member of Together for Peru. The controversy centered on her legal advisory services, which were reportedly substantiated only by brief monthly reports consisting of a single page and a single photograph of herself, accompanied by short descriptions that lacked any legal analysis. In total, her contracts with this municipality amounted to 48,000 PEN. Across her career, she has accumulated 22 service contracts totaling 82,466.66 PEN, which include engagements with the municipalities of Quiñota, Llusco, and Chumbivilcas.

During the 2026 Peruvian general elections, she was elected as a deputy representing Cusco, securing a seat in the Chamber of Deputies of the Congress of the Republic of Peru following the April parliamentary election results. During the same electoral cycle, she ran for First Vice President of the nation on the presidential ticket led by Roberto Sánchez, which advanced to the 2026 runoff election.

=== Political positions ===
As part of her political agenda, she has expressed support for informal mining, characterizing informal miners as victims of government persecution who perform a "noble and ancestral job." Her platform includes advocating for the extension of the Comprehensive Mining Formalization Registry (REINFO) and proposing modifications to the mining concession system to shorten approval periods. Additionally, she has criticized multinational formal mining corporations, claiming they "contribute nothing to society." She has also publicly supported the convocation of a new constituent assembly.

== See also ==
- Illegal mining in Peru
- Illegal mining
- Roberto Sánchez

== Notes ==
Party political offices
Preceded by José Antonio de Echave	JP nominee for First Vice President of Peru; 2026	Most recent
