= Antabamba (disambiguation) =

Antabamba may refer to:

- Antabamba, a town in Peru
- Antabamba District, in the Antabamba province of Peru
- Antabamba Province, in the Apurímac Region of Peru
