= Waña (Peru) =

Mountain in Peru

- Location within Peru

Highest point
- Elevation: 5,400 m (17,700 ft)
- Coordinates: 14°36′25″S 72°27′13″W

Geography
- Location: Peru, Cusco Region, Chumbivilcas Province
- Parent range: Andes, Wansu

Waña (Aymara for dry, Quechua for a potato variety, Hispanicized spelling Huaña) is a mountain in the Wansu mountain range in the Andes of Peru, about 5,400 metres (17,717 ft) high. It is situated in the Cusco Region, Chumbivilcas Province, Santo Tomás District. Waña lies northwest of Wamanripa, northeast of Chankuwaña, east of Wayunka and southeast of Ikma.
