= Surimana (Waytani) =

Mountain in Peru

- Location within Peru

Highest point
- Elevation: 5,000 m (16,000 ft)
- Coordinates: 14°41′12″S 72°26′57″W

Geography
- Location: Peru, Cusco Region
- Parent range: Andes, Wansu

Surimana (Aymara for a sort of potatoes (white and long), also spelled Sorimana) is a mountain in the Wansu mountain range in the Andes of Peru, about 5,000 metres (16,404 ft) high. It is situated in the Cusco Region, Chumbivilcas Province, Santo Tomás District. Surimana lies south of Uturunku, southwest of Wamanripa, and southeast of Waytani and Wansillu.
