= Muntirayuq (Apurímac) =

Mountain in Peru

- Location within Peru

Highest point
- Elevation: 5,000 m (16,000 ft)
- Coordinates: 14°35′01″S 72°40′41″W

Geography
- Location: Peru, Apurímac Region
- Parent range: Andes, Wansu

Muntirayuq (Quechua muntira ancient cloth cap; bullfighter's hat, -yuq a suffix, 'the one with a cap', also spelled Monterayoc) is a mountain in the Wansu mountain range in the Andes of Peru, about 5,000 metres (16,404 ft) high. It lies in the Apurímac Region, Antabamba Province, Antabamba District. Muntirayuq is situated north of Saywa Punta and east of Pachak Pata.
