= Wallqa Wallqa (Apurímac) =

Mountain in Peru

- Location within Peru

Highest point
- Elevation: 5,200 m (17,100 ft)
- Coordinates: 14°40′9″S 72°41′36″W

Geography
- Location: Peru, Apurímac Region, Antabamba Province
- Parent range: Andes

Wallqa Wallqa (Quechua wallqa collar, the reduplication indicates that there is a group or a complex of something, "a complex of collars", Hispanicized spelling Hualca Hualca) is a mountain in the Andes of Peru, about 5,200 metres (17,060 ft) high. It is situated in the Apurímac Region, Antabamba Province, Antabamba District. Wallqa Wallqa lies south-west of the mountains Sara Sara and Runtu Quri, near the northern border of the Arequipa Region.

== See also ==
- Inti Utka
