= Quncha Urqu =

Mountain in Peru

- Location within Peru

Highest point
- Elevation: 5,000 m (16,000 ft)
- Coordinates: 14°36′49″S 72°42′53″W

Geography
- Location: Peru, Apurímac Region, Antabamba Province
- Parent range: Andes, Wansu

Quncha Urqu (Quechua quncha mushroom, urqu mountain, "mushroom mountain", Hispanicized spelling Joncha Orjo) is a mountain in the Wansu mountain range in the Andes of Peru, about 5,000 metres (16,404 ft) high. It is situated in the Apurímac Region, Antabamba Province, Antabamba District. Quncha Urqu lies near Saywa Punta, Llulluch'a, Lluqu Chuyma and Q'illu in the northeast, south, southwest and north.
