= Paychi =

Mountain in the Andes of Peru

- Location within Peru

Highest point
- Elevation: 5,000 m (16,000 ft)
- Coordinates: 14°35′40″S 72°48′04″W

Geography
- Location: Peru, Apurímac Region
- Parent range: Andes, Wansu

Paychi (Quechua for Petiveria alliacea, also spelled Payche) is a mountain in the Wansu mountain range in the Andes of Peru, about 5,000 metres (16,404 ft) high. It is situated in the Apurímac Region, Antabamba Province, in the districts of Antabamba and Juan Espinoza Medrano. Paychi lies northwest of Quri Waraqa and southeast of Quri Pawkara.
