= Q'illu =

Mountain in Peru

- Location within Peru

Highest point
- Elevation: 5,000 m (16,000 ft)
- Coordinates: 14°36′20″S 72°42′47″W

Geography
- Location: Peru, Apurímac Region, Antabamba Province
- Parent range: Andes, Wansu

Q'illu (Quechua for yellow, Hispanicized spelling Quello) is a mountain in the Wansu mountain range in the Andes of Peru, about 5,000 metres (16,404 ft) high. It is situated in the Apurímac Region, Antabamba Province, Antabamba District. Q'illu lies north of Quncha Urqu and northeast of Lluqu Chuyma and Llulluch'a.
