= Kuntur Wasi (Peru) =

Mountain in Peru

- Location within Peru

Highest point
- Elevation: 4,800 m (15,700 ft)
- Coordinates: 14°34′21″S 72°50′57″W

Geography
- Location: Peru, Apurímac Region
- Parent range: Andes, Wansu

Kuntur Wasi (Quechua kuntur condor, wasi rock, "condor house", also spelled Condorhuasi) is a mountain in the Wansu mountain range in the Andes of Peru, about 4,800 metres (15,748 ft) high. It is situated in the Apurímac Region, Antabamba Province, Juan Espinoza Medrano District. Kuntur Wasi lies west of the peaks of Quri Pawkara and northwest of Yana Uqhu and Yuraq Qaqa.
