= Yana Urqu (Apurímac) =

Mountain in Peru

- Location within Peru

Highest point
- Elevation: 5,000 m (16,000 ft)
- Coordinates: 14°32′47″S 72°34′38″W

Geography
- Location: Peru, Apurímac Region
- Parent range: Andes, Wansu

Yana Urqu (Quechua yana black, urqu mountain, "black mountain", hispanicized spelling Yanaorjo) is a mountain in the north of the Wansu mountain range in the Andes of Peru, about 5,000 m (16,404 ft) high. It is situated in the Apurímac Region, Antabamba Province, Oropesa District. Yana Urqu lies southwest of Willkarana and Kisu Qutu.
