= Sura Kallanka =

Mountain in Peru

- Location within Peru

Highest point
- Elevation: 5,000 m (16,000 ft)
- Coordinates: 14°13′40″S 72°28′44″W

Geography
- Location: Peru, Apurímac Region
- Parent range: Andes

Sura Kallanka (Quechua kallanka large roofed building used for celebrations during the Inca Empire, Hispanicized spelling Soracallanca) is a mountain in the Andes of Peru, about 5,000 metres (16,404 ft) high. It is situated in the Apurímac Region, Antabamba Province, Oropesa District. It lies southeast of Kimsaqucha, Mallmanya and Hatun Q'asa. North of Sura Kallanka there is a lake named Suraqucha (Soracocha).
