= Kinra =

Mountain in Peru

- Location within Peru

Highest point
- Elevation: 5,000 m (16,000 ft)
- Coordinates: 14°42′41″S 72°22′10″W

Geography
- Location: Peru, Cusco Region, Chumbivilcas Province
- Parent range: Andes, Wansu

Kinra (Quechua kimray, kinray, kinra slope, Hispanicized spelling Quinra) is a mountain in the Wansu mountain range in the Andes of Peru, about 5,000 metres (16,404 ft) high. It is situated in the Cusco Region, Chumbivilcas Province, Santo Tomás District. Kinra lies south of the river Qañawimayu and north of Ch'iyara Ch'iyara.
