= Jalanta =

Mountain in Peru

- Location within Peru

Highest point
- Elevation: 5,100 m (16,700 ft)
- Coordinates: 14°36′22″S 72°26′00″W

Geography
- Location: Peru, Cusco Region, Chumbivilcas Province
- Parent range: Andes, Wansu

Jalanta (Aymara jalaña to fly, running of water; west, -nta a suffix, jalanta, inti jalanta west, also spelled Alanta) is a mountain in the Wansu mountain range in the Andes of Peru, reaching about 5,100 metres (16,732 ft) above sea level. It is situated in the Cusco Region, Chumbivilcas Province, Santo Tomás District. Jalanta lies north of Wamanripa and east of Waña.
