= Uqi Saywa =

Mountain in Peru

- Location within Peru

Highest point
- Elevation: 4,800 m (15,700 ft)
- Coordinates: 14°33′09″S 72°45′59″W

Geography
- Location: Peru, Apurímac Region
- Parent range: Andes, Wansu

Uqi Saywa (Quechua uqi lead, lead-colored, saywa boundary stone, landmark,) also spelled Oque Sayhua) is a mountain in the Wansu mountain range in the Andes of Peru, about 4,800 metres (15,748 ft) high. It is situated in the Apurímac Region, Antabamba Province, Antabamba District. Paychi lies north of Paqu Qhawana and northeast of Yana Ranra and Puka Urqu.
