= Paychi (Antabamba) =

Mountain in Peru

- Location within Peru

Highest point
- Elevation: 5,000 m (16,000 ft)
- Coordinates: 14°36′49″S 72°38′07″W

Geography
- Location: Peru, Apurímac Region
- Parent range: Andes, Wansu

Paychi (Quechua for Petiveria alliacea, also spelled Payche) is a mountain in the Wansu mountain range in the Andes of Peru, about 5,000 metres (16,404 ft) high. It is located in the Apurímac Region, Antabamba Province, Antabamba District. Paychi lies north of Phuk'iña and northeast of Runtu Quri and Sara Sara.
