= Misa Urqu =

Mountain in Peru

- Location within Peru

Highest point
- Elevation: 4,800 m (15,700 ft)
- Coordinates: 14°31′02″S 72°33′30″W

Geography
- Location: Peru, Apurímac Region
- Parent range: Andes, Wansu

Misa Urqu (Quechua misa table, urqu mountain, literally "table mountain", hispanicized spelling Misa Orjo) is a mountain in the north of the Wansu mountain range in the Andes of Peru, about 4,800 m (15,748 ft) high. It is situated in the Apurímac Region, Antabamba Province, Oropesa District. Misa Urqu lies north of Kisu Qutu on a ridge west of Willkarana.
