= Warmiqucha (Cusco) =

Lake in the Cusco Region, Peru

- Location within Peru
- Location: Peru; Cusco Region
- Coordinates: 14°35′09″S 71°43′16″W
- Max. length: 1.02 km (0.63 mi)
- Max. width: 0.55 km (0.34 mi)
- Surface elevation: 4,596 m (15,079 ft)

Warmiqucha (Quechua warmi woman, wife, qucha lake, "woman's lake", Hispanicized spelling Huarmicocha) is a lake in Peru located in the Cusco Region, Chumbivilcas Province, Velille District. It is situated at a height of about 4,596 metres (15,079 ft), about 1.02 km long and 0.55 km at its widest point. Warmiqucha lies northeast of the larger lakes named Urququcha and Khirkiqucha.
