= Uturunku (Peru) =

Mountain in Peru

- Location within Peru

Highest point
- Elevation: 5,000 m (16,000 ft)
- Coordinates: 14°39′5″S 72°27′9″W

Geography
- Location: Peru, Cusco Region
- Parent range: Andes, Wansu

Uturunku (Quechua for jaguar, Hispanicized spelling Otorunco) is a mountain in the Wansu mountain range in the Andes of Peru, about 5,000 metres (16,404 ft) high. It is situated in the Cusco Region, Chumbivilcas Province, Santo Tomás District. Uturunku is surrounded by the mountains Chankuwaña, Wamanripa and Waytani in the northwest, east and southwest.
