= Capacmarca District =

Coordinates: 14.0078°S 72.0017°W

Capacmarca Qhapaqmarka
- District
- Interactive map of Capacmarca
- Country: Peru
- Region: Cusco
- Province: Chumbivilcas
- Founded: January 2, 1857
- Capital: Capacmarca

Government
  - Mayor: John Abel Chavez Nina

Area
  - Total: 271.81 km^{2} (104.95 sq mi)
- Elevation: 3,565 m (11,696 ft)

Population (2005 census)
  - Total: 4,813
  - Density: 17.71/km^{2} (45.86/sq mi)
- Time zone: UTC-5 (PET)
- UBIGEO: 080702

Capacmarca

Capacmarca District is one of eight districts of the province Chumpiwillka in Peru.

== Ethnic groups ==
The people in the district are mainly indigenous citizens of Quechua descent. Quechua is the language which the majority of the population (97.92%) learnt to speak in childhood, 1.57% of the residents started speaking using the Spanish language (2007 Peru Census).

== See also ==
- Qañawimayu
