= Aqu Q'asa =

Mountain in Peru

- Location within Peru

Highest point
- Elevation: 5,091 m (16,703 ft)
- Coordinates: 14°31′14″S 72°38′29″W

Geography
- Location: Peru, Apurímac Region
- Parent range: Andes, Wansu

Aqu Q'asa (Quechua aqu sand, q'asa mountain pass, "sand pass", Hispanicized spelling Ajojasa) is a 5,091-metre-high (16,703 ft) mountain in the Wansu mountain range in the Andes of Peru. It is situated in the Apurímac Region, Antabamba Province, Oropesa District. Aqu Q'asa lies northeast of Hatun Qillqa.
