= Puka Puka (Chumbivilcas) =

Mountain in Peru

- Location within Peru

Highest point
- Elevation: 5,100 m (16,700 ft)
- Coordinates: 14°47′42″S 72°16′48″W

Geography
- Location: Peru, Cusco Region, Chumbivilcas Province
- Parent range: Andes, Wansu

Puka Puka (Quechua puka red, the reduplication indicates that there is a group or a complex of something, "a complex of red color", also spelled Pucapuca) is a mountain in the Wansu mountain range in the Andes of Peru which reaches a height of approximately 5,100 metres (16,732 ft). It is located in the Cusco Region, Chumbivilcas Province, Santo Tomás District. Puka Puka lies southeast of Wiska Tunqu.

The Sinqa Wayq'u ("nose brook") originates near the mountain. Its waters flow to the Apurímac River.
