= Colquemarca District =

Coordinates: 14.2857°S 72.0399°W

Colquemarca Qullqi Marka
- District
- Interactive map of Colquemarca; Qullqi Marka
- Country: Peru
- Region: Cusco
- Province: Chumbivilcas
- Capital: Colquemarca

Government
  - Mayor: Sabino Yaguno Merma

Area
  - Total: 449.49 km^{2} (173.55 sq mi)
- Elevation: 3,575 m (11,729 ft)

Population (2005 census)
  - Total: 9,493
  - Density: 21.12/km^{2} (54.70/sq mi)
- Time zone: UTC-5 (PET)
- UBIGEO: 080704

Colquemarca (Quechua: Qullqi Marka, meaning 'silver town') is one of eight districts of the Chumbivilcas Province in Peru.

== Geography ==
One of the highest peaks of the district is Wamanwiri at approximately 4,600 m (15,100 ft). Other mountains are listed below:

- Arma Wachu
- Apachita
- Chuqichampi
- Ch'iqu Rumi
- Kiswarniyuq
- Khuchi Kancha
- Larwiri Q'illu Urqu
- Paquni
- Pilluni
- Pirwa Q'asa
- Puyani
- Qucha Pata
- Qullqa
- Saywayuq Muqu
- Tampu
- Taya
- Waqra Marka
- Waway Qucha
- Waywalla

== Ethnic groups ==
The people in the district are mainly indigenous citizens of Quechua descent. Quechua is the language which the majority of the population (92.41%) learnt to speak in childhood, 7.21% of the residents started speaking using the Spanish language (2007 Peru Census).

== See also ==
- Qañawimayu
