= Yuraq Kancha (Cusco) =

Mountain in Peru

- Location within Peru

Highest point
- Elevation: 5,000 m (16,000 ft)
- Coordinates: 14°45′41″S 72°25′15″W

Geography
- Location: Peru, Cusco Region, Chumbivilcas Province
- Parent range: Andes, Wansu

Yuraq Kancha (Quechua yuraq white, kancha corral, enclosure, frame, also spelled Yurajcancha) is a mountain in the Wansu mountain range in the Andes of Peru, about 5,000 metres (16,404 ft) high. It is situated in the Cusco Region, Chumbivilcas Province, Santo Tomás District. Yuraq Kancha lies north of Minasniyuq and Qullpa K'uchu. The river Qañawimayu originates near the mountain.
