= Igma =

Mountain in Peru

- Location within Peru

Highest point
- Elevation: 5,291 m (17,359 ft)
- Coordinates: 14°34′56″S 72°27′36″W

Naming
- Language of name: Quechua

Geography
- Location: Peru, Apurímac Region, Cusco Region
- Parent range: Andes, Huanzo

Igma (possibly from Quechua for widow) is a 5,291-metre-high (17,359 ft) mountain in the Huanzo mountain range in the Andes of Peru. It is situated in the Apurímac Region, Antabamba Province, Oropesa District, and in the Cusco Region, Chumbivilcas Province, Santo Tomás District. Igma lies north of the mountain Chancohuana, northeast of Huayunca and southeast of Atuncollpa.
