= Pilluni (Apurímac-Cusco) =

Mountain in Peru

- Location within Peru

Highest point
- Elevation: 5,000 m (16,000 ft)
- Coordinates: 14°30′48″S 72°28′4″W

Naming
- Language of name: Aymara

Geography
- Location: Peru, Apurímac Region, Cusco Region
- Parent range: Andes

Pilluni (Aymara pillu crown or cord which some indigenous peoples use to tighten their hair, -ni a suffix to indicate ownership, "the one with a crown" or "the one with a pillu", Hispanicized spelling Pillune) is a mountain in the Andes of Peru, about 5,000 m (16,000 ft) high. It is situated in the Apurímac Region, Antabamba Province, Oropesa District, and in the Cusco Region, Chumbivilcas Province, Santo Tomás District. Pilluni lies northeast of Hatunqullpa at the Hatun Qullpa valley (Jatun Collpa). The waters of its intermittent stream flow to the Qañawimayu.
