= Waman Ch'arpa =

Mountain in Peru

- Location within Peru

Highest point
- Elevation: 5,000 m (16,000 ft)
- Coordinates: 14°36′26″S 72°36′39″W

Geography
- Location: Peru, Apurímac Region
- Parent range: Andes, Wansu

Waman Ch'arpa (Quechua waman falcon or variable hawk, ch'arpa gold nugget, Hispanicized spelling Huamancharpa) is a mountain in the Wansu mountain range in the Andes of Peru, about 5,000 metres (16,404 ft) high. It is situated in the Apurímac Region, Antabamba Province, Oropesa District. Waman Ch'arpa lies southeast of Q'illu Pachaka.
