= Yuraq Urqu =

Yuraq Urqu (Quechua yuraq white, urqu mountain, "white mountain", also spelled Yurac Orcco, Yurac Orjo, Yuracc Orcco, Yuraj Orkho, Yuraccorcco, Yuracorcco, Yuracorjo) may refer to:

- Yuraq Urqu (Apurímac), a mountain in the Apurímac Region, Peru
- Yuraq Urqu (Arequipa), a mountain in the Arequipa Region, Peru
- Yuraq Urqu (Arequipa-Moquegua), a mountain on the border of the Arequipa Region and the Moquegua Region, Peru
- Yuraq Urqu (Ayacucho), a mountain in the Ayacucho Region, Peru
- Yuraq Urqu (Bolivia), a mountain in the Potosí Department, Bolivia
