= Yana Uqhu (Apurímac) =

Mountain in Peru

- Location within Peru

Highest point
- Elevation: 4,800 m (15,700 ft)
- Coordinates: 14°35′51″S 72°50′10″W

Geography
- Location: Peru, Apurímac Region
- Parent range: Andes, Wansu

Yana Uqhu (Quechua yana black, uqhu swamp, Hispanicized spelling Yanaojo) is a mountain in the Wansu mountain range in the Andes of Peru, about 4,800 metres (15,748 ft) high. It is situated in the Apurímac Region, Antabamba Province, Juan Espinoza Medrano District. Yana Uqhu lies southwest of the peaks of Quri Pawkara and south of Yuraq Qaqa.
