= Hatunqullpa =

Mountain in Peru

- Location within Peru

Highest point
- Elevation: 5,200 m (17,100 ft)
- Coordinates: 14°34′9″S 72°29′14″W

Geography
- Location: Peru, Apurímac Region, Cusco Region
- Parent range: Andes, Wansu

Hatunqullpa (Quechua hatun big, qullpa salpeter, "big salpeter (mountain)", Hispanicized spelling Atuncollpa) is a mountain in the Wansu mountain range in the Andes of Peru, about 5,200 metres (17,060 ft) high. It is located in the Apurímac Region, Antabamba Province, Oropesa District, and in the Cusco Region, Chumbivilcas Province, Santo Tomás District. Hatunqullpa is situated north of the mountains Chankuwaña, Wayunka and Pinta Pata and south-west of the mountain Pilluni.

The Hatun Qullpa valley (Jatun Collpa) lies northeast of the mountain. The waters of its intermittent stream flow to the river Qañawimayu.
