= Wank'ayuq Saywa =

Mountain in Peru

- Location within Peru

Highest point
- Elevation: 5,000 m (16,000 ft)
- Coordinates: 14°34′51″S 72°38′34″W

Geography
- Location: Peru, Apurímac Region
- Parent range: Andes, Wansu

Wank'ayuq Saywa (Quechua wank'a rock, -yuq a suffix to indicate ownership, saywa boundary stone, landmark, "rocky landmark" or "landmark with rocks", Hispanicized spelling Huancayojsayhua, Hiancayojsayhua) is a mountain in the Wansu mountain range in the Andes of Peru, about 5,000 metres (16,404 ft) high. It is situated in the Apurímac Region, Antabamba Province, in the districts of Antabamba and Oropesa. Wank'ayuq Saywa lies west of Q'illu Pachaka and southeast of Hatun Qillqa.
