= Sullu Sullu =

Mountain in Peru

- Location within Peru

Highest point
- Elevation: 5,100 m (16,700 ft)
- Coordinates: 14°33′53″S 72°26′53″W

Geography
- Location: Peru, Cusco Region
- Parent range: Andes, Wansu

Sullu Sullu (Aymara sullu miscarried (fetus), Quechua sullu miscarriage; unborn fetus; key for doors or boxes, the reduplication indicates that there is a group or a complex of something, also spelled Sullo Sullo) is a mountain in the Wansu mountain range in the Andes of Peru, about 5,100 metres (16,732 ft) high. It is situated in the Cusco Region, Chumbivilcas Province, Santo Tomás District. Sullu Sullu lies south of Sara Sara and northeast of Ikma.
