= T'alla Kallanka =

Mountain in Peru

- Location within Peru

Highest point
- Elevation: 5,000 m (16,000 ft)
- Coordinates: 14°35′09″S 72°32′31″W

Geography
- Location: Peru, Apurímac Region
- Parent range: Andes, Wansu

T'alla Kallanka (Quechua t'alla outstanding woman of the Inca aristocracy, kallanka large roofed building used for celebrations during the Inca Empire, Hispanicized spelling Tallacallanca) is a mountain in the Wansu mountain range in the Andes of Peru, about 5,000 metres (16,404 ft) high. It is situated in the Apurímac Region, Antabamba Province, Oropesa District. T'alla Kallanka lies west of Millu and northwest of Mina Q'asa.
