= Mina Q'asa =

Mountain in Peru

- Location within Peru

Highest point
- Elevation: 5,100 m (16,700 ft)
- Coordinates: 14°35′37″S 72°30′58″W

Geography
- Location: Peru, Apurímac Region
- Parent range: Andes, Wansu

Mina Q'asa (Spanish mina mine, Quechua q'asa mountain pass, "mine pass", also spelled Minajasa) is a mountain in the Wansu mountain range in the Andes of Peru, about 5,100 metres (16,732 ft) high. It is situated in the Apurímac Region, Antabamba Province, Oropesa District. Mina Q'asa lies south of Puka Urqu and southeast of Millu.
