= Utkhu =

Mountain in Peru

- Location within Peru

Highest point
- Elevation: 4,800 m (15,700 ft)
- Coordinates: 14°32′45″S 72°48′27″W

Geography
- Location: Peru, Apurímac Region
- Parent range: Andes, Wansu

Utkhu (Quechua for cotton, also spelled Ucto, Utco) is a mountain in the Wansu mountain range in the Andes of Peru, about 4,800 metres (15,748 ft) high. It is situated in the Apurímac Region, Antabamba Province, in the districts of Antabamba and Juan Espinoza Medrano. Utkhu lies northeast of Quri Pawkara.
