= Warmiqucha (disambiguation) =

Warmiqucha (Quechua warmi woman, qucha lake, "woman's lake", Hispanicized spellings Huarmi Cocha, Huarmiccocha, Huarmicocha, also Huarmicochas) may refer to:

- Warmiqucha, a lake in the Huancavelica Region, Peru
- Warmiqucha (Cusco), a lake in the Cusco Region, Peru
- Warmiqucha (Junín), a lake in the Junín Region, Peru
