= Urpi Marka =

Mountain in Peru

- Location within Peru

Highest point
- Elevation: 5,068 m (16,627 ft)
- Coordinates: 14°38′12″S 72°49′28″W

Geography
- Location: Peru, Apurímac Region
- Parent range: Andes, Wansu

Urpi Marka (Quechua urpi dove, marka village, "dove village", also spelled Urpimarca) is a 5,068-metre-high (16,627 ft) mountain in the Wansu mountain range in the Andes of Peru. It is situated in the Apurímac Region, Antabamba Province, Juan Espinoza Medrano District. Urpi Marka lies west Sara Sara.
