= Yana Ranra (Apurímac) =

Mountain in Peru

- Location within Peru

Highest point
- Elevation: 5,002 m (16,411 ft)
- Coordinates: 14°34′26″S 72°47′20″W

Geography
- Location: Peru, Apurímac Region
- Parent range: Andes, Wansu

Yana Ranra (Quechua yana black, ranra stony; stony ground, "black stony ground", also spelled Yanaranra) is 5,002-metre-high (16,411 ft) mountain in the Wansu mountain range in the Andes of Peru. It is situated in the Apurímac Region, Antabamba Province, Antabamba District. Yana Ranra lies west of Paqu Qhawana, north of Quri Waraqa and south of Puka Urqu. South of Yana Ranra there is a small lake name Qiñwaqucha (Quechua for Polylepis lake, Queñuacocha)
