= Sinqa Wayq'u =

- Etymology: Quechua

Location
- Country: Peru
- Region: Cusco Region

Physical characteristics
- Source
  - coordinates: 14°47′50″S 72°16′20″W
  - elevation: 4,910 m (16,110 ft)
- Mouth: Qañawimayu
  - location: Santo Tomás District
  - coordinates: 14°33′02″S 72°08′54″W

The Sinqa Wayq'u (Quechua sinqa nose, wayq'u brook or valley, "nose brook (or valley)", Hispanicized spelling Senjahuayjo) which upstream successively is named Urqulla Wayq'u (Orjollahuayjo), Ancha Pallqa (Anchapallja), Wankarama (Huancarama) and Waraqu (Huarajo) is a river in the Cusco Region of Peru. It is located in the Chumbivilcas Province, Santo Tomás District. It belongs to the watershed of the Apurímac River.

The Sinqa Wayq'u originates at a height of 4,910 m (16,110 ft) near a mountain named Puka Puka in the south of the Santo Tomás District. Known as Urqulla Wayq'u it flows to a lake named Quchapata (Ccochapata) in the northeast. After leaving the lake it changes its name to Ancha Pallqa, and after receiving waters from Pallqa Wayq'u (Palljahuajo) it is named Wankarama. The river keeps the northeastern direction up to its confluence with the Waraqu River (waraqu means "cactus"). From now on the river takes the name Waraqu and its direction is to the north. At the confluence with the Qurawat'amayu ("herb island river", Curahuatamayo), a right affluent, it receives the name Sinq'a Wayq'u. The river keeps the name until its confluence with the Qañawimayu near the village of Ch'illiwani (Chillihuani).
