= Yuraq Urqu (Apurímac) =

Mountain in Peru

- Location within Peru

Highest point
- Elevation: 4,800 m (15,700 ft)
- Coordinates: 14°30′09″S 72°43′31″W

Geography
- Location: Peru, Apurímac Region
- Parent range: Andes, Wansu

Yuraq Urqu (Quechua yuraq white, urqu mountain, "white mountain", Hispanicized spelling Yurac Orjo) is a mountain in the Wansu mountain range in the Andes of Peru, about 4,800 metres (15,748 ft) high. It is situated in the Apurímac Region, Antabamba Province, Antabamba District. Yuraq Urqu lies to the northwest of Yawriwiri and Jalanta.
