= Sisiwa =

Mountain in Peru

- Location within Peru

Highest point
- Elevation: 4,949 m (16,237 ft)
- Coordinates: 14°33′15″S 72°36′31″W

Geography
- Location: Peru, Apurímac Region
- Parent range: Andes, Wansu

Sisiwa (Hispanicized spelling Sisihua) is a 4,949-metre-high (16,237 ft) mountain in the Wansu mountain range in the Andes of Peru. It is situated in the Apurímac Region, Antabamba Province, Oropesa District. Sisiwa lies east of Hatun Qillqa and Yuraq Urqu.
