= Hatun Q'asa =

Mountain in Peru

- Location within Peru

Highest point
- Elevation: 5,000 m (16,000 ft)
- Coordinates: 14°13′15″S 72°29′34″W

Geography
- Location: Peru, Apurímac Region
- Parent range: Andes

Hatun Q'asa (Quechua hatun big (jatun in Bolivia), q'asa mountain pass, "big mountain pass", Hispanicized spelling Jatunjasa) is a mountain in the Andes of Peru, about 5,000 metres (16,404 ft) high. It is situated in the Apurímac Region, Antabamba Province, Oropesa District. It lies south of Mallmanya, northwest of Sura Kallanka and southeast of Kimsaqucha. East of Hatun Q'asa there is a lake named Suraqucha (Soracocha).
