= Llusco District =

Coordinates: 14.3386°S 72.1150°W

Llusco Llusk'u
- District
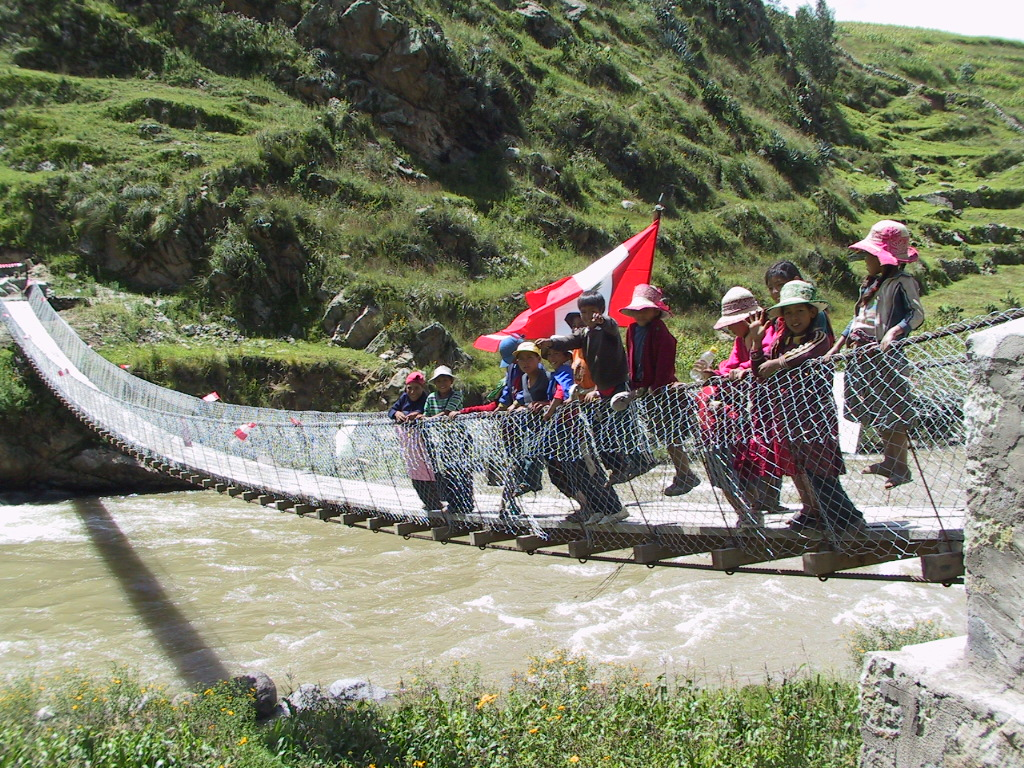
- Footbridge across Qañawimayu (or Santo Tomás River) in Qullpatumayku, Llusco District
- Interactive map of Llusco
- Country: Peru
- Region: Cusco
- Province: Chumbivilcas
- Founded: January 2, 1857
- Capital: Llusco

Government
  - Mayor: Jesús Rimache Huamani

Area
  - Total: 315.42 km^{2} (121.78 sq mi)
- Elevation: 3,525 m (11,565 ft)

Population (2005 census)
  - Total: 7,325
  - Density: 23.22/km^{2} (60.15/sq mi)
- Time zone: UTC-5 (PET)
- UBIGEO: 080706

Llusco District is one of eight districts of the province Chumbivilcas in Peru.

== Geography ==
One of the highest peaks of the district is Qillwa Sirk'a at 4,600 m (15,100 ft). Other mountains are listed below:

- Payrumani
- Puka Marka
- Runa Runa
- Urquni
- Yana P'unqu
- Yuraq Urqu

== Ethnic groups ==
The people in the district are mainly indigenous citizens of Quechua descent. Quechua is the language which the majority of the population (97.65%) learnt to speak in childhood, 2.27% of the residents started speaking using the Spanish language (2007 Peru Census).

== See also ==
- Qañawimayu
