= Huch'uy Sara Sara =

Mountain in Peru

- Location within Peru

Highest point
- Elevation: 5,131 m (16,834 ft)
- Coordinates: 14°36′57″S 72°47′41″W

Geography
- Location: Peru, Apurímac Region
- Parent range: Andes, Wansu

Huch'uy Sara Sara (Quechua huch'uy little, Sara Sara the name of a mountain near Huch'uy Sara Sara, "little Sara Sara", also spelled Uchuy Sara Sara) is a 5,131-metre-high (16,834 ft) mountain in the Wansu mountain range in the Andes of Peru. It is situated in the Apurímac Region, Antabamba Province, in the districts of Antabamba and Juan Espinoza Medrano. Huch'uy Sara Sara lies south of Quri Waraqa and north of Sara Sara.
