= T'ikapallana =

Mountain in Peru

- Location within Peru

Highest point
- Elevation: 4,304.1 m (14,121 ft)
- Coordinates: 14°22′15″S 71°51′12″W

Geography
- Location: Peru, Cusco Region, Chumbivilcas Province
- Parent range: Andes

T'ikapallana (Quechua t'ika flower, pallay to collect, pallana an instrument to collect fruit / collectable, "a place where you collect flowers", Hispanicized spelling Ticapallana) is a mountain in the Andes of Peru. Its summit reaches about 4,304.1 m (14,121 ft) above sea level. T'ikapallana is situated in the Cusco Region, Chumbivilcas Province, Chamaca District.
