= Siq'i Urqu =

Mountain in Peru

- Location within Peru

Highest point
- Elevation: 4,850 m (15,910 ft)
- Coordinates: 14°44′50″S 71°53′34″W

Geography
- Location: Peru, Cusco Region
- Parent range: Andes

Siq'i Urqu (Quechua siq'i scratch, urqu mountain, "scratch mountain", hispanicized spelling Seque Orcco) is a mountain in the Andes of Peru which reaches a height of approximately 4,850 m (15,910 ft). It is located in the Cusco Region, Chumbivilcas Province, Santo Tomás District, and in the Espinar Province, Coporaque District.
