= Oropesa District, Antabamba =

Coordinates: 14°15′22″S 72°33′18″W

Oropesa
- District
- Interactive map of Oropesa
- Country: Peru
- Region: Apurímac
- Province: Antabamba
- Founded: January 2, 1857
- Capital: Oropesa

Government
  - Mayor: Darwin Edizon Cruz Lopez

Area
  - Total: 1,180.12 km^{2} (455.65 sq mi)
- Elevation: 3,310 m (10,860 ft)

Population (2005 census)
  - Total: 2,806
  - Density: 2.378/km^{2} (6.158/sq mi)
- Time zone: UTC-5 (PET)
- UBIGEO: 030305

Oropesa District is one of the seven districts of the province Antabamba in Peru.

== Geography ==
The Wansu mountain range traverses the province. Some of the highest peaks of the province are listed below:

- Allqa Walusa
- Aqu Q'asa
- Chachakumani
- Chaku Q'asa
- Chankuwaña
- Chikuruni
- Hatun Aqu Pampa
- Hatun Q'asa
- Hatun Sura
- Hatunqullpa
- Ichhu Muqu
- Ikma
- Inkap Tiyana
- Japu
- Kallanka
- Kampanillayuq
- Kimsaqucha
- Kisu Qutu
- Kuntur Wachana
- Kunturi
- Lawa Kunka
- Luntu Marka
- Luychu
- Llaqta Pampa
- Llaqta Qhata
- Llaqtarana
- Millu
- Mina Q'asa
- Misa Urqu
- Pallqayuq
- Parqa Marka
- Parqa Sirka
- Pilluni
- Puka Puka
- Puka Urqu
- Pukarani
- Phiruru
- Quncha Urqu
- Qusqu Qhawarina
- Q'illu Pachaka
- Q'illu Urqu
- Q'illu Wachu
- Q'iru Q'asa
- Salli
- Saqsa
- Saqsa P'ukru
- Sisiwa
- Sura Kallanka
- Sura Pata
- Taruja Marka
- T'alla Kallanka
- Waman Ch'arpa
- Wamanillu
- Wank'ayuq Saywa
- Wasi Pampa
- Wayllani
- Waytani
- Wayunka
- Willka Marka
- Willkarana
- Wiraqucha Pata
- Wiska
- Yana Qaqa Pampa
- Yana Urqu
- Yuraq Urqu
- Yuraq Wasina

== Ethnic groups ==
The people in the district are mainly indigenous citizens of Quechua descent. Quechua is the language which the majority of the population (86.65%) learnt to speak in childhood, 12.79% of the residents started speaking using the Spanish language (2007 Peru Census). Its seat is Oropesa.
