= Chamaca District =

Coordinates: 14.3015°S 71.8512°W

Chamaca Ch'amaka
- District
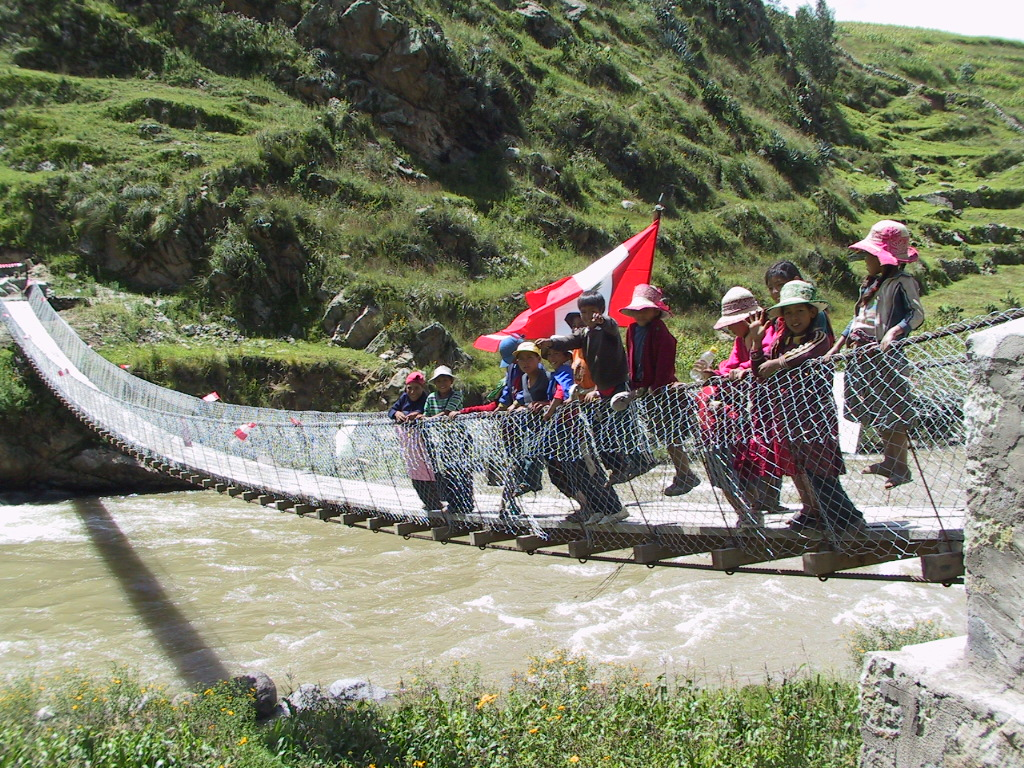
- Collpatomaico footbridge
- Interactive map of Chamaca
- Country: Peru
- Region: Cusco
- Province: Chumbivilcas
- Founded: January 2, 1857
- Capital: Chamaca

Government
  - Mayor: Victor Rolando Abarca Peña

Area
  - Total: 674.19 km^{2} (260.31 sq mi)
- Elevation: 3,754 m (12,316 ft)

Population (2005 census)
  - Total: 6,993
  - Density: 10.37/km^{2} (26.86/sq mi)
- Time zone: UTC-5 (PET)
- UBIGEO: 080703

Chamaca (Quechua: Chamaqa; Aymara: Ch'amaka, meaning, dark or darkness) is one of eight districts of the Chumbivilcas Province in Peru.

== Geography ==
One of the highest peaks of the district is Qala Qala at approximately 4,400 m (14,400 ft). Other mountains are listed below:

- Allqu Wasi
- Ch'iyar Jaqhi
- Hatun Taruka Marka
- Kuntur Marka
- Kuntur Wasi
- Llama Kancha
- Mulli Pata
- Ñawiyuq
- Pampa
- Pichqa Pukyu
- Pinqulluni
- Puma Suyru
- Qachu
- Quyllur Urqu
- Saywa
- Surimana
- Taruka Marka
- Tintaya
- T'uqra
- Wachuna
- Waylla Punchu
- Willa Qawi
- Willkani
- Wisalla
- Yana Qaqa

== Ethnic groups ==
The people in the district are mainly indigenous citizens of Quechua descent. Quechua is the language which the majority of the population (93.64%) learnt to speak in childhood, 6.12% of the residents started speaking using the Spanish language (2007 Peru Census).

== See also ==
- T'ikapallana
