= Ccoyo =

Human settlement in Peru

Coordinates: 14°29′00″S 072°07′00″W

Ccoyo is a populated place in Cusco Region, Peru.

== See also ==
- Acomayo
- Antabamba
- Chuquibambilla
- Paruro
- Raqchi
- Tambobamba
