= Puka Urqu (Oropesa) =

Mountain in Peru

- Location within Peru

Highest point
- Elevation: 4,950 m (16,240 ft)
- Coordinates: 14°33′38″S 72°30′52″W

Geography
- Location: Peru, Apurímac Region
- Parent range: Andes, Wansu

Puka Urqu (Quechua puka red, urqu mountain, "red mountain", Hispanicized spelling Puca Orco) is a mountain in the Wansu mountain range in the Andes of Peru, about 4,950 metres (16,240 ft) high. It is situated in the Apurímac Region, Antabamba Province, Oropesa District. Puka Urqu lies west of Hatunqullpa and northeast of Millu.
