= Santo Tomás District, Chumbivilcas =

Santo Tomás District
- District
- Interactive map of Santo Tomás District
- Country: Peru
- Region: Cusco
- Province: Chumbivilcas
- Capital: Santo Tomás

Government
  - Mayor: Domingo Benito Calderon

Area
  - Total: 1,924.08 km^{2} (742.89 sq mi)
- Elevation: 3,660 m (12,010 ft)

Population (2005 census)
  - Total: 24,614
  - Density: 12.793/km^{2} (33.133/sq mi)
- Time zone: UTC-5 (PET)
- UBIGEO: 080701

Santo Tomás District is one of eight districts of the province Chumbivilcas in Peru.

== Geography ==
The Wansu mountain range traverses the district. Some of the highest peaks of the district are listed below:

- Allpa Marka
- Apachita
- Chaku
- Chaku Urqu
- Chankuwaña
- Ch'iyara Ch'iyara
- Hatun Kunturi
- Hatun Q'asa
- Hatunqullpa
- Ikma
- Jalanta
- Kallanka
- Kimsa Kancha
- Kinra
- Kuntur K'uchu
- Kunturi
- Kuraw Qhata
- Luruma
- Minasniyuq
- Muru Sirka
- Parqu Parqu
- Pata Wasi
- Paychi
- Pichaqani
- Pillu
- Pilluni
- Pintapata
- Pirwa
- Puka Puka
- Puka Urqu
- Pukara
- Qayqu
- Qillqa
- Qullpa
- Qullpa K'uchu
- Q'illu Q'illu
- Sara Sara
- Saywa
- Siq'i Urqu
- Sullu Sullu
- Sunqu
- Surapata
- Surimana (near Minasniyuq)
- Surimana (near Waytani)
- Taruja Marka
- T'alla T'alla
- T'uru Rumi
- Uturunku
- Wamani Wayta
- Wamanripa
- Wansu Apachita
- Waña
- Waña Q'awa
- Warmi Aqu
- Waych'awi
- Waytani
- Wiska Tunqu
- Wiska Waqi
- Yana Qaqa
- Yana Urqu
- Yuraq Kancha
- Yuraq Qaqa

== Ethnic groups ==
The people in the district are mainly indigenous citizens of Quechua descent. Quechua is the language which the majority of the population (85.05%) learnt to speak in childhood, 14.63% of the residents started speaking using the Spanish language (2007 Peru Census).

== Climate ==
Climate data for Santo Tomás, elevation 3,212 m (10,538 ft), (1991–2020)
Month	Jan	Feb	Mar	Apr	May	Jun	Jul	Aug	Sep	Oct	Nov	Dec	Year
Mean daily maximum °C (°F)	22.4 (72.3)	22.3 (72.1)	22.3 (72.1)	22.4 (72.3)	22.5 (72.5)	22.1 (71.8)	21.7 (71.1)	23.0 (73.4)	23.6 (74.5)	24.2 (75.6)	24.9 (76.8)	23.5 (74.3)	22.9 (73.2)
Mean daily minimum °C (°F)	7.4 (45.3)	7.6 (45.7)	7.4 (45.3)	5.3 (41.5)	1.2 (34.2)	−1.5 (29.3)	−1.6 (29.1)	−0.2 (31.6)	3.0 (37.4)	4.9 (40.8)	5.3 (41.5)	6.7 (44.1)	3.8 (38.8)
Average precipitation mm (inches)	162.7 (6.41)	181.5 (7.15)	167.0 (6.57)	57.1 (2.25)	8.6 (0.34)	2.1 (0.08)	5.2 (0.20)	6.7 (0.26)	18.5 (0.73)	51.6 (2.03)	56.1 (2.21)	133.6 (5.26)	850.7 (33.49)
Source: National Meteorology and Hydrology Service of Peru

== See also ==
- Chukchu
- Qañawimayu
- Sinqa Wayq'u
- Wamanmarka
