= Pachak Pata =

Mountain in Peru

- Location within Peru

Highest point
- Elevation: 4,800 m (15,700 ft)
- Coordinates: 14°34′51″S 72°41′44″W

Geography
- Location: Peru, Apurímac Region
- Parent range: Andes, Wansu

Pachak Pata (Quechua pachak, pachaq one hundred, pata step, bank of a river, "one hundred steps", Hispanicized spelling Pachacpata) is a mountain in the Wansu mountain range in the Andes of Peru, about 4,800 metres (15,748 ft) high. It is situated in the Apurímac Region, Antabamba Province, Antabamba District. Pachak Pata lies west of Muntirayuq and northwest of Saywa Punta.
