= Hatun Urqu (Chumbivilcas) =

Mountain in Peru

- Location within Peru

Highest point
- Elevation: 4,400 m (14,400 ft)
- Coordinates: 14°31′10″S 71°48′6″W

Naming
- Language of name: Quechua

Geography
- Location: Peru, Cusco Region, Chumbivilcas Province
- Parent range: Andes

Hatun Urqu (Quechua hatun big, urqu, mountain, "big mountain", Hispanicized spelling Ccatunorcco) is a mountain in the Cusco Region in Peru, about 4,400 metres (14,436 ft) high. It is situated in the Chumbivilcas Province, Velille District, south-east of Velille.
