= Huaquirca District =

Coordinates: 14°12′47″S 72°11′24″W

Huaquirca
- District
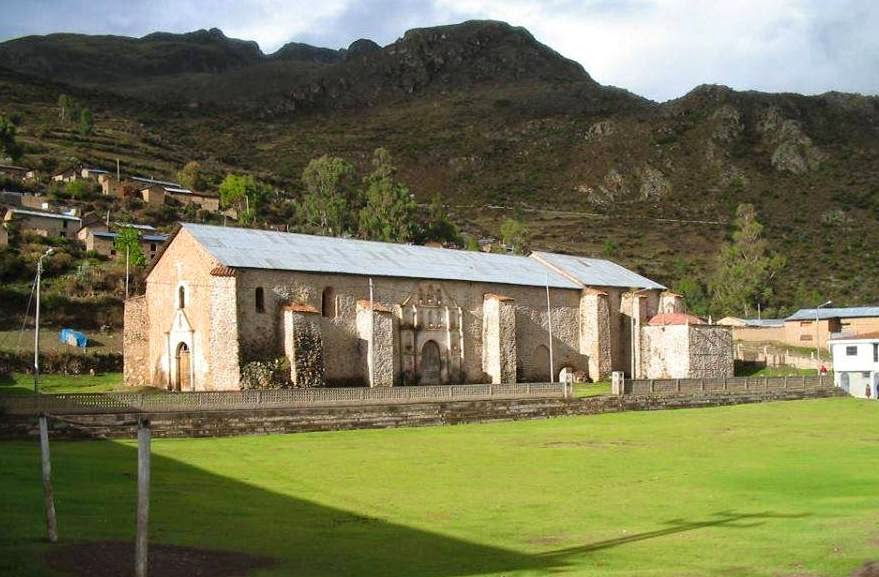
- Colonial church of Huaquirca
- Interactive map of Huaquirca
- Country: Peru
- Region: Apurímac
- Province: Antabamba
- Founded: January 17, 1945
- Capital: Huaquirca

Government
  - Mayor: Erasmo Manuelo Quispe

Area
  - Total: 337.6 km^{2} (130.3 sq mi)
- Elevation: 3,480 m (11,420 ft)

Population (2005 census)
  - Total: 1,420
  - Density: 4.21/km^{2} (10.9/sq mi)
- Time zone: UTC-5 (PET)
- UBIGEO: 030303

Huaquirca District is one of the seven districts of the Antabamba Province in the [Apurímac Region] in Peru.

== Ethnic groups ==
The people in the district are mainly indigenous citizens of Quechua descent. Quechua is the language which the majority of the population (87.92%) learnt to speak in childhood, 11.93% of the residents started speaking using the Spanish language (2007 Peru Census).
