= Juan Espinoza Medrano District =

Coordinates: 13°48′00″S 72°31′01″W

Juan Espinoza Medrano Mullipampa
- District
- Interactive map of Juan Espinoza Medrano
- Country: Peru
- Region: Apurímac
- Province: Antabamba
- Founded: December 12, 1942
- Capital: Mollebamba

Government
  - Mayor: Leoncio Espiritu Miraya Mendoza

Area
  - Total: 623.22 km^{2} (240.63 sq mi)
- Elevation: 3,229 m (10,594 ft)

Population (2005 census)
  - Total: 2,286
  - Density: 3.668/km^{2} (9.500/sq mi)
- Time zone: UTC-5 (PET)
- UBIGEO: 030304

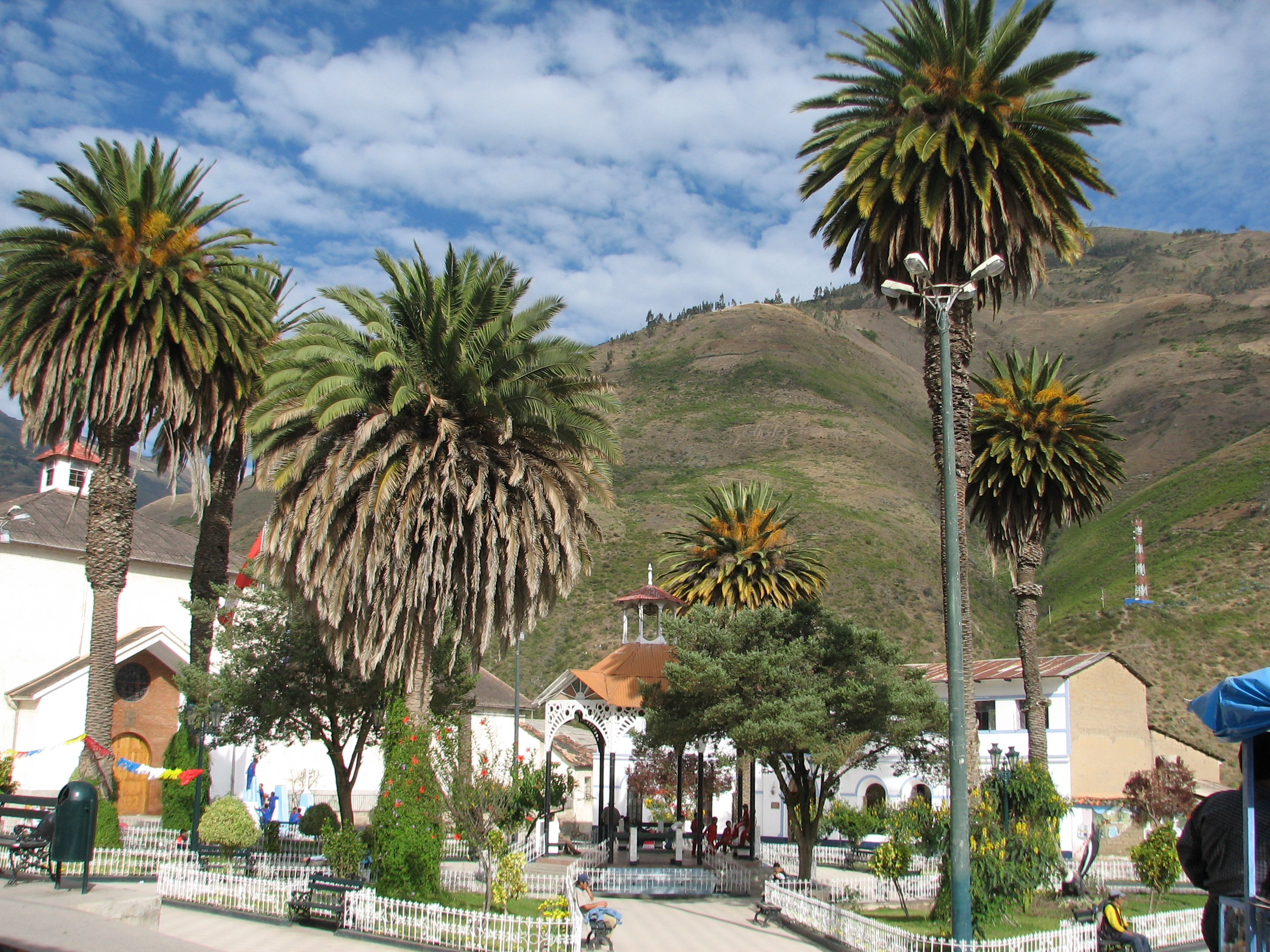
Central plaza in Abancay, Apurímac, Peru.

Juan Espinoza Medrano District is one of the seven districts in the province of Antabamba, Peru. The district is named after Juan de Espinosa Medrano, the most prominent figure of the Literary Baroque of Peru.

== Geography ==
The Wansu mountain range traverses the province, featuring some of the highest peaks of the province, which are listed below:

- Chaka Urqu
- Huch'uy Sara Sara
- Kuntur Wasi
- Kunturi
- Lunq'u
- Llamuqa
- Millu K'uchu
- Panti Pata
- Paychi
- Pilluni
- Pirqa
- Puka Ranra
- Puka Willka
- Pumanuta
- Quri Pawkara
- Quri Waraqa
- Runtuqucha
- Sara Sara
- Surapata
- T'uruyuq
- Urpi Marka
- Utkhu
- Wamanripa
- Yana Uqhu
- Yuraq Qaqa
- Yuraq Urqu

== Ethnic groups ==
The residents of the district are mainly indigenous citizens of Quechua descent. Quechua is the language which most of the population (75.41%) learnt to speak during childhood, while 23.66% of the residents started speaking Spanish, according to the 2007 Peru Census.
