= Wiska Waqi =

Mountain in Peru

- Location within Peru

Highest point
- Elevation: 5,291 m (17,359 ft)
- Coordinates: 14°48′34″S 72°20′21″W

Geography
- Location: Peru, Cusco Region, Chumbivilcas Province
- Parent range: Andes, Wansu

Wiska Waqi (Aymara wiska wool rope, waqi part, portion, "rope part", Hispanicized spelling Huiscahuaque) is a 5,291-metre-high (17,359 ft) mountain in the Wansu mountain range in the Andes of Peru. It is situated in the Cusco Region, Chumbivilcas Province, Santo Tomás District. Wiska Waqi lies northwest of Hatun Waychawi.
