= Chukchu =

Festival and satirical dance in the Andes, Peru

Chukchu (Quechua for malaria) is the name of a festival and a satirical dance of the Andes region in Peru. The festival is held annually on August 25 in the Santo Tomás District of the Chumbivilcas Province in the Cusco Region. The dance is performed on festivals dedicated to the patron saints (fiestas patronales) of communities in the provinces of Anta, Canchi, Chumbivilcas, La Convención and Paucartambo. The figures represented in the dance are sick persons, nurses, doctors, assistants and mosquitos. Members of the Chukchu troup may wear sickly masks, that represent plantation house slaves who became infected with malaria in the jungle. Their choreography includes throwing flour on crowd in imitation of the spread of disease.
