= Yuraq Qaqa (Apurímac) =

Mountain in Peru

- Location within Peru

Highest point
- Elevation: 4,800 m (15,700 ft)
- Coordinates: 14°35′08″S 72°50′29″W

Geography
- Location: Peru, Apurímac Region
- Parent range: Andes, Wansu

Yuraq Qaqa (Quechua yuraq white, qaqa rock, "white rock", Hispanicized spelling Yuracjaja) is a mountain in the Wansu mountain range in the Andes of Peru, about 4,800 metres (15,748 ft) high. It is situated in the Apurímac Region, Antabamba Province, Juan Espinoza Medrano District. Yuraq Qaqa lies west of the peaks of Quri Pawkara and southeast of Kuntur Wasi.
