= Mamara District =

Coordinates: 14°13′44″S 72°35′10″W

Mamara
- District
- Interactive map of Mamara
- Country: Peru
- Region: Apurímac
- Province: Grau
- Founded: January 2, 1857
- Capital: Mamara

Government
  - Mayor: Julian Alejandrino Challco Quispe

Area
  - Total: 66.21 km^{2} (25.56 sq mi)
- Elevation: 3,590 m (11,780 ft)

Population (2005 census)
  - Total: 959
  - Density: 14.5/km^{2} (37.5/sq mi)
- Time zone: UTC-5 (PET)
- UBIGEO: 030705

Mamara District is one of the fourteen districts of the province Grau in Peru.

== Ethnic groups ==
The people in the district are mainly indigenous citizens of Quechua descent. Quechua is the language which the majority of the population (76.95%) learnt to speak in childhood, 22.60% of the residents started speaking using the Spanish language (2007 Peru Census).

== See also ==
- Kimsaqucha
