= Qillqa (Apurímac) =

Mountain in Peru

- Location within Peru

Highest point
- Elevation: 5,000 m (16,000 ft)
- Coordinates: 14°32′59″S 72°39′45″W

Geography
- Location: Peru, Apurímac Region, Antabamba Province
- Parent range: Andes, Wansu

Qillqa (Quechua for qillqa graphic sign, writing (the act and art of writing), Hispanicized spelling Quilca) is a mountain in the Wansu mountain range in the Andes of Peru, about 5,000 metres (16,404 ft) high. It is situated in the Apurímac Region, Antabamba Province, Antabamba District. Qillqa lies northwest of Hatun Qillqa ("big Qillqa").
