= Wiska (Peru) =

Mountain in Peru

- Location within Peru

Highest point
- Elevation: 4,800 m (15,700 ft)
- Coordinates: 14°15′24″S 72°25′50″W

Geography
- Location: Peru, Apurímac Region
- Parent range: Andes

Wiska (Aymara for "wool rope", Hispanicized spelling Huisca) is a mountain in the Andes of Peru, about 4,800 metres (15,748 ft) high. It is situated in the Apurímac Region, Antabamba Province, Oropesa District, and in the Cotabambas Province, Challhuahuacho District.
