= Pachaconas District =

Coordinates: 14°13′23″S 73°01′34″W

- District
- Interactive map of Pachaconas District
- Country: Peru
- Region: Apurímac
- Province: Antabamba
- Founded: August 20, 1872
- Capital: Pachaconas

Government
  - Mayor: Edison Ortega Campana

Area
  - Total: 226.73 km^{2} (87.54 sq mi)
- Elevation: 3,438 m (11,280 ft)

Population (2005 census)
  - Total: 1,098
  - Density: 4.843/km^{2} (12.54/sq mi)
- Time zone: UTC-5 (PET)
- UBIGEO: 030306

Pachaconas District is one of the seven districts of the province Antabamba in Peru.

== Ethnic groups ==
The people in the district are mainly indigenous citizens of Quechua descent. Quechua is the language which the majority of the population (66.93%) learnt to speak in childhood, 32.71% of the residents started speaking using the Spanish language (2007 Peru Census).
