= Velille District =

Coordinates: 14.5089°S 71.8853°W

Velille
- District
- Interactive map of Velille
- Country: Peru
- Region: Cusco
- Province: Chumbivilcas
- Capital: Velille

Government
  - Mayor: Cornelio Coaquira Valencia

Area
  - Total: 756.84 km^{2} (292.22 sq mi)
- Elevation: 3,730 m (12,240 ft)

Population (2005 census)
  - Total: 8,419
  - Density: 11.12/km^{2} (28.81/sq mi)
- Time zone: UTC-5 (PET)
- UBIGEO: 080708

Velille District is one of eight districts of the province Chumbivilcas in Peru.

== Geography ==
One of the highest peaks of the district is Anka Wachana at 4,640 m (15,220 ft). Other mountains are listed below:

- Ch'illkani
- Ch'uspini Urqu
- Hatun Q'asa
- Hatun Urqu
- Isku Urqu
- Kimsa Ranra
- Khari Khari
- Laqaya Pata
- Lariwiri
- Millu Urqu
- Misayuq
- Nasa Parqu
- Pata Wasi
- Puka Puka
- Punta Pata
- Qarwa Tanka
- Sach'a P'ukru
- Sayanta
- Sunqu
- Sura Quta
- Surani
- Suraq Pampa
- Tintaya
- Uqururu
- Waman Wiri
- Wankarani
- Warmi Wasi
- Waych'a Waych'a
- Waylla Apachita
- Yana Qaqa
- Yana Urqu

== Ethnic groups ==
The people in the district are mainly indigenous citizens of Quechua descent. Quechua is the language which the majority of the population (87.09%) learnt to speak in childhood, 12.61% of the residents started speaking using the Spanish language (2007 Peru Census).

== See also ==
- Khirkiqucha
- Urququcha
- Warmiqucha
