= Anka Wachana (Chumbivilcas) =

Mountain in Peru

- Location within Peru

Highest point
- Elevation: 4,640.9 m (15,226 ft)
- Coordinates: 14°32′38″S 71°58′51″W

Geography
- Location: Peru, Cusco Region, Chumbivilcas Province
- Parent range: Andes

Anka Wachana (Quechua anka black-chested buzzard-eagle or eagle, wacha birth, to give birth -na a suffix, "where the eagle is born", Hispanicized spelling Ancahuachana) is a mountain in the Andes of Peru. Its summit reaches about 4,640.9 m (15,226 ft) above sea level. Anka Wachana is situated in the Cusco Region, Chumbivilcas Province, Velille District.
