= Quiñota District =

Coordinates: 14.3097°S 72.1338°W

Quiñota
- District
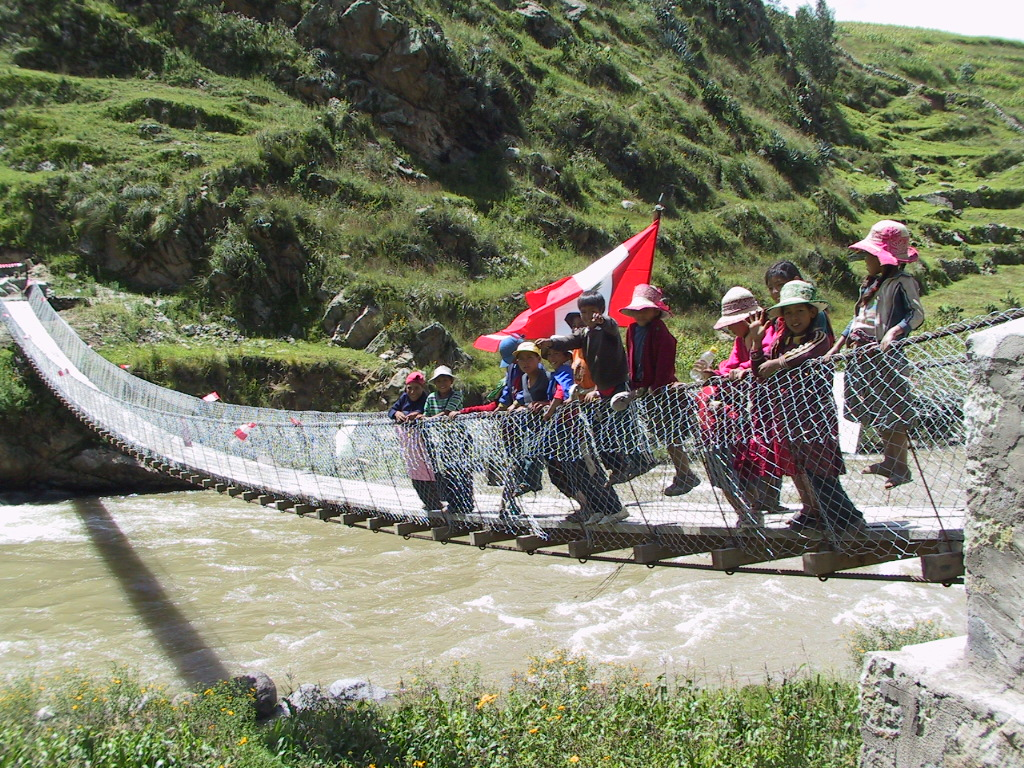
- Collpatomaico footbridge
- Interactive map of Quiñota
- Country: Peru
- Region: Cusco
- Province: Chumbivilcas
- Founded: March 17, 1962
- Capital: Quiñota

Government
  - Mayor: Zacarias Chahua Marquez

Area
  - Total: 221.05 km^{2} (85.35 sq mi)
- Elevation: 3,590 m (11,780 ft)

Population (2005 census)
  - Total: 4,661
  - Density: 21.09/km^{2} (54.61/sq mi)
- Time zone: UTC-5 (PET)
- UBIGEO: 080707

Quiñota District is one of eight districts of the Chumbivilcas Province in Peru.

== Geography ==
One of the highest peaks of the district is Puka Qaqa at approximately 4,400 m (14,400 ft). Other mountains are listed below:

- Hatun Urqu
- Minas Pata
- Parqa Urqu
- Qillwa Sirk'a
- Waman Ruru
- Wat'a Pata
- Wisk'achani
- Yawri Yawri

== Ethnic groups ==
The people in the district are mainly indigenous citizens of Quechua descent. Quechua is the language which the majority of the population (95.31%) learnt to speak in childhood, 4.29% of the residents started speaking using the Spanish language (2007 Peru Census).

== See also ==
- Qañawimayu
