= Chumbivilcas province =

Coordinates: 14.450857°S 72.082403°W

Chumbivilcas
- Province
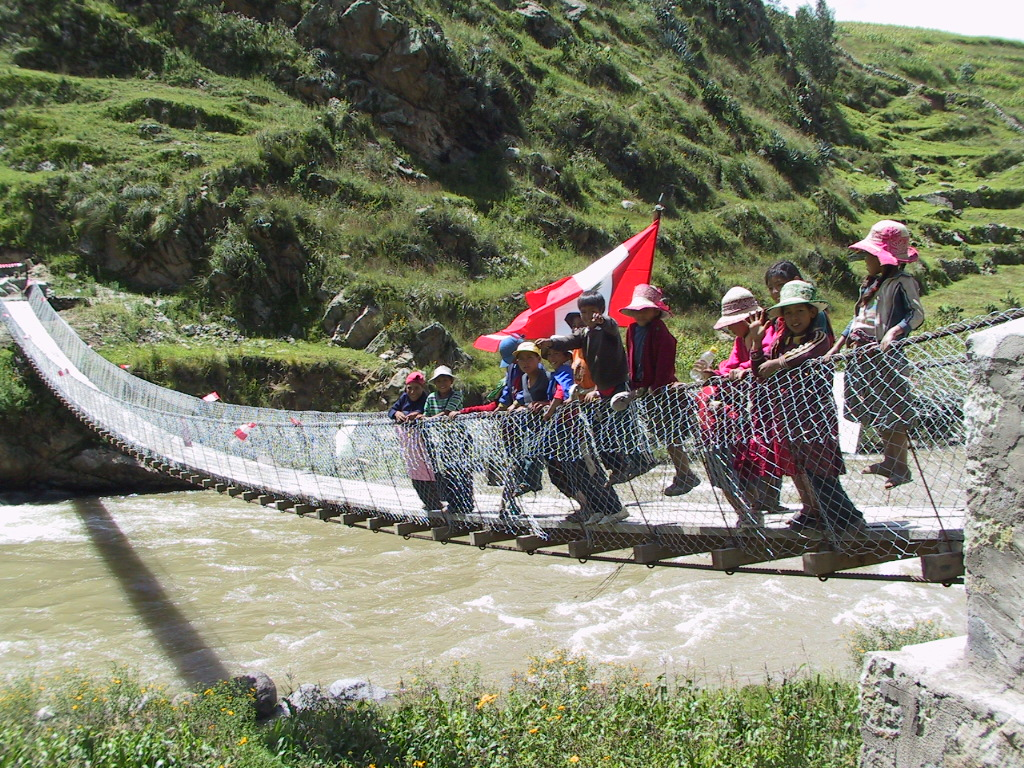
- Children are waving the Peruvian flag on the new footbridge across Qañawimayu in Qullpatumayku, Chumbivilcas Province

- Location of Chumbivilcas in the Cusco Region
- Country: Peru
- Region: Cusco
- Founded: June 21, 1825
- Capital: Santo Tomás

Government
  - Mayor: Domingo Benito Calderon (2007)

Area
  - Total: 5,371.08 km^{2} (2,073.79 sq mi)

Population (2005 census)
  - Total: 77,721
  - Density: 14.470/km^{2} (37.478/sq mi)
- UBIGEO: 0807

Chumbivilcas is a province in the Cusco Region in Southern Peru. The Incas called it "Chumpiwillka". The seat of the province is Santo Tomás. Officially Chumbivilcas was founded on June 21, 1825.

== Geography ==
Some of the most important rivers of the area are Velille River, Qañawimayu and Sinqa Wayq'u which are springs of the Apurímac River.

The Wansu mountain range traverses the province. Some of the highest peaks of the province are listed below:

- Allpa Marka
- Anka Wachana
- Apachita
- Chaku
- Chaku Urqu
- Chankuwaña
- Ch'iyara Ch'iyara
- Hatun Kunturi
- Hatun Q'asa
- Hatun Urqu
- Hatunqullpa
- Ikma
- Jalanta
- Kimsa Kancha
- Kinra
- Kuntur K'uchu
- Kuraw Qhata
- Luruma
- Minasniyuq
- Muru Sirka
- Parqu Parqu
- Pata Wasi
- Paychi
- Pichaqani
- Pilluni
- Pintapata
- Puka Puka
- Puka Urqu
- Pukara
- Qayqu
- Qillqa
- Qullpa
- Qullpa K'uchu
- Q'illu Q'illu
- Sara Sara
- Saywa
- Siq'i Urqu
- Sullu Sullu
- Sunqu
- Surapata
- Surimana (near Minasniyuq)
- Surimana (near Waytani)
- Taruja Marka
- Tuqtu
- T'alla T'alla
- T'ikapallana
- T'uru Rumi
- Uturunku
- Wamani Wayta
- Wamanripa
- Wansu Apachita
- Waña
- Waña Q'awa
- Warmi Aqu
- Waych'awi
- Waytani
- Wiska Tunqu
- Wiska Waqi
- Yana Qaqa
- Yana Urqu
- Yuraq Kancha
- Yuraq Qaqa

== Population ==
According to the Peru 2005 Census 77,721 inhabitants live in an area of 5,371.08 km^{2}. There are about 77 rural communities. Chumbivilcas is looked upon as one of the poorest regions of the country. Half of the population is younger than 16 years. In the rural communities families with eight and more children are not unusual.

=== Ethnic groups ===
The people in the province are mainly indigenous citizens of Quechua descent. Quechua is the language which the majority of the population (91.07%) learnt to speak in childhood, 8.62% of the residents started speaking in Spanish (2007 Peru Census).

Because of the migration of a high number of rural people to the towns the Spanish language (castellano) is getting more and more influence. School children are taught bilingually by law.

== Political divisions ==
Chumbivilcas is one of 13 provinces of the Cusco Region. It is divided into eight districts:

- Santo Tomás
- Capacmarca
- Chamaca
- Colquemarca
- Livitaca
- Llusco
- Quiñota
- Velille

== See also ==
- Ccoyo
- Chukchu
- Khirkiqucha
- Tupay Tuqtu
- Urququcha
- Wamanmarka
- Warmiqucha

== Graphics ==
- The Provinces of Cusco Region
- The Districts
