= Kisu Qutu =

Mountain in Peru

- Location within Peru

Highest point
- Elevation: 5,177 m (16,985 ft)
- Coordinates: 14°32′27″S 72°33′07″W

Geography
- Location: Peru, Apurímac Region
- Parent range: Andes, Wansu

Kisu Qutu (Aymara kisu magnetite, qutu little heap, "magnetite heap", Hispanicized spelling Quesocoto) is a 5,177-metre-high (16,985 ft) mountain in the north of the Wansu mountain range in the Andes of Peru. It is situated in the Apurímac Region, Antabamba Province, Oropesa District. Kisu Qutu lies southwest of Willkarana.
