= Ch'iyara Ch'iyara =

Mountain in Peru

- Location within Peru

Highest point
- Elevation: 5,000 m (16,000 ft)
- Coordinates: 14°45′28″S 72°22′06″W

Geography
- Location: Peru, Cusco Region, Chumbivilcas Province
- Parent range: Andes, Wansu

Ch'iyara Ch'iyara (Aymara ch'iyara black, the reduplication indicates that there is a group or a complex of something, "a complex of black color", Hispanicized spelling Chiarachiara) is a mountain in the Wansu mountain range in the Andes of Peru, about 5,000 metres (16,404 ft) high. It is situated in the Cusco Region, Chumbivilcas Province, Santo Tomás District. Ch'iyara Ch'iyara lies northeast of Minasniyuq and Qullpa K'uchu.
