= Q'illu Pachaka =

Mountain in Peru

- Location within Peru

Highest point
- Elevation: 5,000 m (16,000 ft)
- Coordinates: 14°34′45″S 72°37′08″W

Geography
- Location: Peru, Apurímac Region
- Parent range: Andes, Wansu

Q'illu Pachaka (Quechua q'illu yellow, Hispanicized spelling Jellopachaca) is a mountain in the Wansu mountain range in the Andes of Peru, about 5,000 metres (16,404 ft) high. It is situated in the Apurímac Region, Antabamba Province, Oropesa District. Q'illu Pachaka lies east of Wank'ayuq Saywa and southeast of Hatun Qillqa.
