= Huiscatongo =

Mountain in Peru

- Location within Peru

Highest point
- Elevation: 5,200 m (17,100 ft)
- Coordinates: 14°46′50″S 72°17′4″W

Geography
- Location: Peru, Cusco Region, Chumbivilcas Province
- Parent range: Andes, Huanzo

Huiscatongo (possibly from Aymara wiska wool rope, tunqu maize "rope maize") is a mountain in the east of the Huanzo mountain range in the Andes of Peru, about 5,200 metres (17,060 ft) high. It is situated in the Cusco Region, Chumbivilcas Province, Santo Tomás District. Huiscatongo lies between the mountains Quilca in the north and Puca Puca in the south.
