= Querquecocha =

Lake in Cusco, Peru

- Location within Peru
- Location: Peru; Cusco Region
- Coordinates: 14°37′48″S 71°50′13″W
- Max. length: 1.87 km (1.16 mi)
- Max. width: 0.55 km (0.34 mi)
- Surface elevation: 4,323 m (14,183 ft)

Querquecocha (possibly from Quechua khirki armadillo / very rough, qucha lake, "armadillo lake" or "rough lake") is a lake in Peru located in the Cusco Region, Chumbivilcas Province, Velille District. It is situated at a height of about 4,323 metres (14,183 ft), about 1.87 km long and 0.55 km at its widest point. Querquecocha lies south-east of Velille and north of the lake Orccococha.
