= Yawriwiri =

Mountain in Peru

- Location within Peru

Highest point
- Elevation: 5,000 m (16,000 ft)
- Coordinates: 14°32′31″S 72°42′14″W

Geography
- Location: Peru, Apurímac Region
- Parent range: Andes, Wansu

Yawriwiri or Yawri Wiri (Aymara, Hispanicized spelling Yaurihuiri) is a mountain in the Wansu mountain range in the Andes of Peru, about 5,000 metres (16,404 ft) high. It is situated in the Apurímac Region, Antabamba Province, Antabamba District. Yawriwiri lies between Pumaranra in the east and Apachita in the west.
