= Orccococha (Cusco) =

Lake in Peru

- Location within Peru Location within South America
- Interactive map of Orccococha
- Location: Peru; Cusco Region
- Coordinates: 14°39′32″S 71°50′45″W
- Max. length: 1.33 km (0.83 mi)
- Max. width: 0.47 km (0.29 mi)
- Surface elevation: 4,430 m (14,530 ft)

Orccococha (possibly from Quechua urqu male / mountain, qucha lake, "mountain lake" or "male lake") is a lake in Peru located in the Cusco Region, Chumbivilcas Province, Velille District. It is situated at a height of about 4,430 metres (14,534 ft), about 1.33 km long and 0.47 km at its widest point. Orccococha lies south-east of Velille and south of the lake Querquecocha.
