= Runtu Quri =

Mountain in Peru

- Location within Peru

Highest point
- Elevation: 5,000 m (16,000 ft)
- Coordinates: 14°37′14″S 72°40′00″W

Geography
- Location: Peru, Apurímac Region, Antabamba Province
- Parent range: Andes, Wansu

Runtu Quri (Quechua runtu hail with large particles / egg, quri gold, "coarse-particle gold", Hispanicized spelling Runtucori) is a mountain in the Wansu mountain range in the Andes of Peru, about 5,000 metres (16,404 ft) high. It is situated in the Apurímac Region, Antabamba Province, Antabamba District. Runtu Quri lies northeast of Wallqa Wallqa.

== See also ==
- Inti Utka
