= Millu (Apurímac) =

Mountain in Peru

- Location within Peru

Highest point
- Elevation: 5,100 m (16,700 ft)
- Coordinates: 14°34′58″S 72°31′12″W

Geography
- Location: Peru, Apurímac Region
- Parent range: Andes, Wansu

Millu (Aymara for a kind of salpeter / light brown, reddish, fair-haired, dark chestnut, Quechua for salty, Hispanicized spelling Millo) is a mountain in the Wansu mountain range in the Andes of Peru, about 5,100 metres (16,732 ft) high. It is situated in the Apurímac Region, Antabamba Province, Oropesa District. Millu lies southwest of Puka Urqu and northwest of Mina Q'asa.
