= Puka Urqu (Antabamba) =

Mountain in Peru

- Location within Peru

Highest point
- Elevation: 4,800 m (15,700 ft)
- Coordinates: 14°33′52″S 72°47′06″W

Geography
- Location: Peru, Apurímac Region
- Parent range: Andes, Wansu

Puka Urqu (Quechua puka red, urqu mountain,) "red mountain", Hispanicized spelling Puca Orjo) is a mountain in the Wansu mountain range in the Andes of Peru, about 4,800 metres (15,748 ft) high. It is situated in the Apurímac Region, Antabamba Province, Antabamba District. Paychi lies northwest of Paqu Qhawana and north of Yana Ranra.
