= Lluqu Chuyma =

Mountain in Peru

- Location within Peru

Highest point
- Elevation: 5,000 m (16,000 ft)
- Coordinates: 14°37′54″S 72°43′41″W

Geography
- Location: Peru, Apurímac Region, Antabamba Province
- Parent range: Andes, Wansu

Lluqu Chuyma (Aymara lluqu, lluqu lluqu heart, chuyma heart or another organ, also spelled Llocochuyma) is a mountain in the Wansu mountain range in the Andes of Peru, about 5,000 metres (16,404 ft) high. It is situated in the Apurímac Region, Antabamba Province, Antabamba District. Lluqu Chuyma lies southwest of Llulluch'a.
