= Wamanripa (Cusco) =

Mountain in Peru

- Location within Peru

Highest point
- Elevation: 5,300 m (17,400 ft)
- Coordinates: 14°39′54″S 72°24′24″W

Geography
- Location: Peru, Cusco Region
- Parent range: Andes, Wansu

Wamanripa (local name for Senecio or a species of it, also applied for Laccopetalum giganteum, Hispanicized spelling Huamanripa) is a mountainous complex in the Wansu mountain range in the Andes of Peru, about 5,300 metres (17,388 ft) high. It is situated in the Cusco Region, Chumbivilcas Province, Santo Tomás District. Wamanripa lies southeast of the mountain Chankuwaña and east of the mountains Waytani and Uturunku.

The highest peak of Wamanripa lies in the northeast of the massif at the Wamanripa valley. The slightly lower northwest peak lies at 14°38′55″S 72°25′24″W. One of the highest peaks southwest of the main peak lies at 14°40′53″S 72°25′8″W. The river Qañawimayu flows along its southern slope.
