= Antabamba =

Antabamba Antapampa
- Town
- Location within Peru
- Coordinates: 14°22′26.58″S 72°53′18.12″W
- Country: Peru
- Region: Apurímac Region
- Province: Antabamba Province
- District: Antabamba District

Government
  - Mayor: Raul Carrasco Ccallme
- Elevation: 3,636 m (11,929 ft)
- Website: http://antabamba.com/

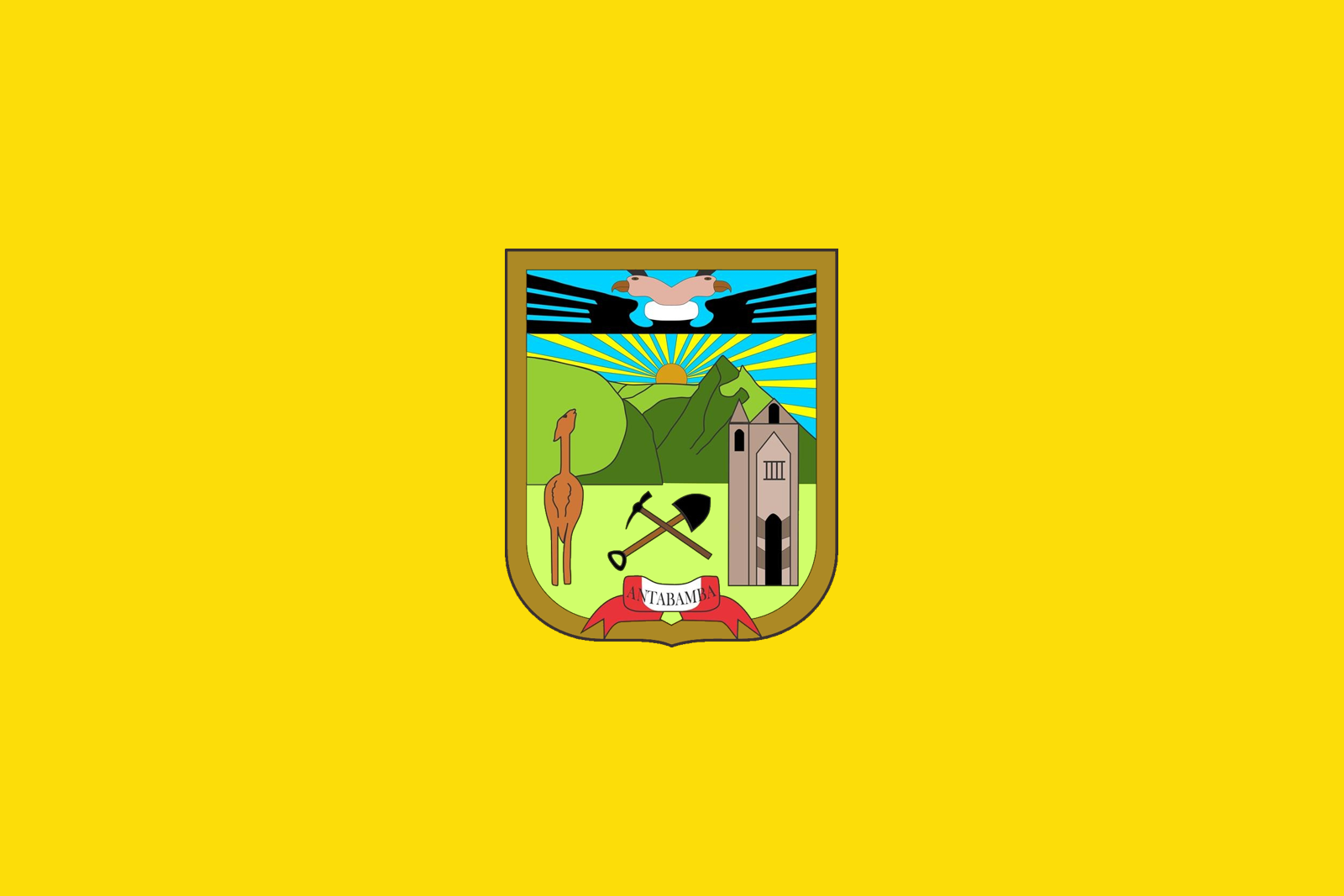
The flag of Antabamba

Antabamba (in Hispanicized spelling) or Antapampa (Quechua anta copper, pampa plain, "copper plain") is a town in southern Peru, capital of the province with the same name in the region Apurímac. Place of birth of the renamed essayist Juan de Espinosa Medrano "El Lunarejo" who in the sixteenth century, the so-called "Spanish Golden Era" wrote, since a remote place of the empire, the best argument in favor of the Culteralismo movement, impressing all of the cultural escenario of his times.

Antabamba is a rich place in natural resources and specially in minerals. Gold, silver, copper, and iron could be easily found but the remote mountainous area and the lack of roads makes their exploitation unprofitable.
