= Wayunka =

Mountain in Peru

- Location within Peru

Highest point
- Elevation: 5,300 m (17,400 ft)
- Coordinates: 14°36′24″S 72°29′23″W

Geography
- Location: Peru, Apurímac Region
- Parent range: Andes, Wansu

Wayunka (Quechua for "bunch of bananas", Hispanicized spelling Huayunca) is a mountain in the Wansu mountain range in the Andes of Peru that is about 5,300 metres (17,388 ft) high. It is situated in the Apurímac Region, Antabamba Province, Oropesa District, northwest of the mountains Waytani and Chankuwaña.
