= Antabamba District =

Coordinates: 14°29′13″S 73°30′43″W

Antabamba District Distrito de Antapampa
- District
- Interactive map of Antabamba District
- Country: Peru
- Region: Apurímac
- Province: Antabamba
- Capital: Antabamba

Government
  - Mayor: Raul Carrasco Ccallme

Area
  - Total: 603.76 km^{2} (233.11 sq mi)
- Elevation: 3,636 m (11,929 ft)

Population (2005 census)
  - Total: 3,343
  - Density: 5.537/km^{2} (14.34/sq mi)
- Time zone: UTC-5 (PET)
- UBIGEO: 030301

Antabamba (in Hispanicized spelling) or Antapampa (Quechua anta copper, pampa plain, "copper plain") is one of the seven districts of the Antabamba Province in Peru.

== Geography ==
The Wansu mountain range traverses the province. Some of the highest peaks of the province are listed below:

- Hatun Qillqa
- Huch'uy Sara Sara
- Inti Utka
- Llulluch'a
- Lluqu Chuyma
- Muntirayuq
- Pachak Pata
- Paychi (Antabamba)
- Paychi (Antabamba-Esp. Medr.)
- Puka Urqu
- Qillqa
- Quncha Urqu
- Quri Pawkara
- Quri Waraqa
- Q'illu
- Runtu Quri
- Sara Sara
- Saywa Punta
- Uqi Saywa
- Utkhu
- Wank'ayuq Saywa
- Wila Quta
- Yana Ranra
- Yawriwiri
- Yuraq Urqu

== Ethnic groups ==
The people in the district are mainly indigenous citizens of Quechua descent. Quechua is the language which the majority of the population (69.83%) learnt to speak in childhood, 29.36% of the residents started speaking using the Spanish language (2007 Peru Census).

== Climate ==
Climate data for Antabamba, elevation 3,817 m (12,523 ft)
Month	Jan	Feb	Mar	Apr	May	Jun	Jul	Aug	Sep	Oct	Nov	Dec	Year
Mean daily maximum °C (°F)	17.1 (62.8)	17.0 (62.6)	16.8 (62.2)	17.9 (64.2)	18.7 (65.7)	18.2 (64.8)	17.8 (64.0)	18.5 (65.3)	19.0 (66.2)	20.2 (68.4)	20.2 (68.4)	18.9 (66.0)	18.4 (65.1)
Daily mean °C (°F)	11.0 (51.8)	11.0 (51.8)	10.8 (51.4)	10.9 (51.6)	10.3 (50.5)	9.6 (49.3)	9.5 (49.1)	10.5 (50.9)	11.4 (52.5)	12.2 (54.0)	12.5 (54.5)	12.0 (53.6)	11.0 (51.8)
Mean daily minimum °C (°F)	4.9 (40.8)	5.0 (41.0)	4.8 (40.6)	3.7 (38.7)	1.9 (35.4)	0.9 (33.6)	1.2 (34.2)	2.4 (36.3)	3.8 (38.8)	4.2 (39.6)	4.8 (40.6)	5.1 (41.2)	3.6 (38.4)
Average precipitation mm (inches)	208.4 (8.20)	231.0 (9.09)	187.1 (7.37)	56.3 (2.22)	14.4 (0.57)	7.0 (0.28)	6.2 (0.24)	12.4 (0.49)	25.6 (1.01)	45.6 (1.80)	43.4 (1.71)	117.6 (4.63)	955 (37.61)
Source 1: Municipalidad Distrital de Kishuara
Source 2: Plataforma del Estado Peruano (precipitation 1965–2012)
