= Wamanmarka, Chumbivilcas =

Archaeological site in Peru

Wamanmarka
- Location: Peru, Cusco Region, Chumbivilcas Province, Santo Tomás District
- Region: Andes

Site notes
- Height: 3,600 metres (11,811 ft)

Wamanmarka (Quechua waman falcon, marka village, also spelled Huamanmarca, Huamanmarka, Wamanmarca) is an archaeological site in Peru. It is located in the Cusco Region, Chumbivilcas Province, Santo Tomás District, at a height of about 3,600 metres (11,811 ft).
