= Kimsaqucha (Apurímac) =

Mountain in Peru

- Location within Peru

Highest point
- Elevation: 5,000 m (16,000 ft)
- Coordinates: 14°13′7″S 72°30′55″W

Geography
- Location: Peru, Apurímac Region
- Parent range: Andes

Kimsaqucha (Quechua kimsa three, qucha lake, "three lakes", Hispanicized spelling Quimsacocha) is a mountain in the Andes of Peru, about 5,000 metres (16,404 ft) high. It is situated in the Apurímac Region, Antabamba Province, Oropesa District, and in the Grau Province, Mamara District.
