= Llulluch'a =

Mountain in Peru

- Location within Peru

Highest point
- Elevation: 5,102 m (16,739 ft)
- Coordinates: 14°37′14″S 72°43′06″W

Geography
- Location: Peru, Apurímac Region, Antabamba Province
- Parent range: Andes, Wansu

Llulluch'a (Quechua for an edible gelatinous, dark green bacteria (nostocales), also spelled Llullucha) is a 5,102-metre-high (16,739 ft) mountain in the Wansu mountain range in the Andes of Peru. It is situated in the Apurímac Region, Antabamba Province, Antabamba District. Llulluch'a lies southwest of Quncha Urqu.
