= Antabamba province =

Coordinates: 14°25′S 72°45′W

Antabamba
- Province
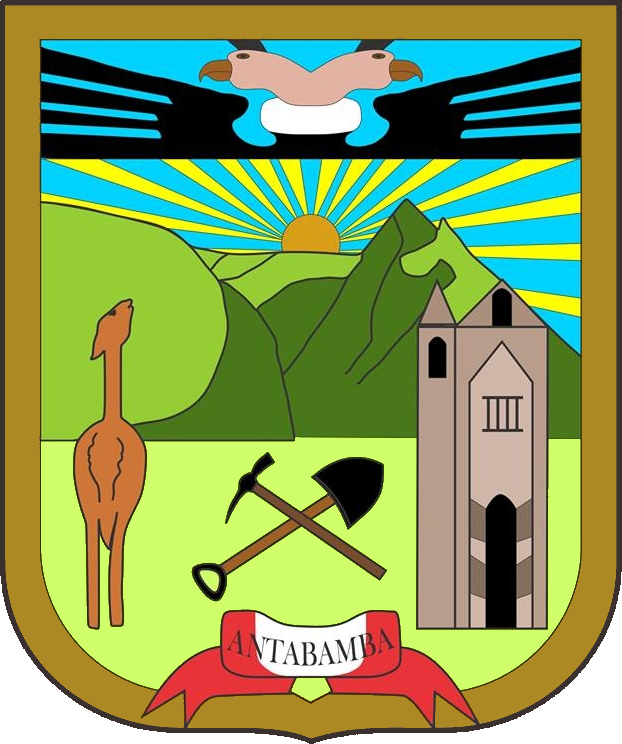
- Coat of arms

- Location of Antabamba in the Apurímac Region
- Country: Peru
- Region: Apurímac
- Capital: Antabamba

Area
  - Total: 3,219.01 km^{2} (1,242.87 sq mi)

Population
  - Total: 11,932
  - Density: 3.7067/km^{2} (9.6004/sq mi)
- Website: www.muniantabamba.gob.pe

Antabamba is one of the seven provinces of the Apurímac Region in Peru. The capital of the province is the city of Antabamba.

== Boundaries ==
- North: province of Grau
- East: province of Cotabambas and Cusco Region
- South: Arequipa Region
- West: province of Aymaraes

== Geography ==
The province of Antabamba covers an area of 1,242.33 square kilometres (479.67 sq mi). The Wansu mountain range traverses the province. Some of the highest peaks of the province are listed below:

- Allqa Walusa
- Aqu Q'asa
- Chachakumani
- Chaku Q'asa
- Chankuwaña
- Hatun Qillqa
- Hatun Q'asa
- Hatunqullpa
- Huch'uy Sara Sara
- Ikma
- Inti Utka
- Kimsaqucha
- Kisu Qutu
- Kiswarani
- Kuntur Wachana
- Kuntur Wasi
- Kunturi
- Luychu
- Lunq'u
- Llamuqa
- Llaqtarana
- Llulluch'a
- Lluqu Chuyma
- Maranniyuq
- Millu
- Mina Q'asa
- Misa Urqu
- Muntirayuq
- Muruq'u
- Pachak Pata
- Paychi (Antabamba)
- Paychi (Antabamba-Esp. Medr.)
- Pilluni
- Pirqa
- Puka Puka
- Puka Ranra
- Puka Urqu (Antabamba)
- Puka Urqu (Oropesa)
- Puka Willka
- Pumanuta
- Phiruru
- Qillqa
- Quncha Urqu
- Quri Pawkara
- Quri Waraqa
- Q'illu
- Q'illu Pachaka
- Q'illu Urqu
- Q'illu Wachu
- Runtu Quri
- Runtuqucha
- Salli
- Sara Sara
- Saywa Punta
- Sisiwa
- Suntur
- Sura Kallanka
- Surapata
- Taruja Marka
- T'alla Kallanka
- Uqi Saywa
- Urpi Marka
- Utkhu
- Waman Ch'arpa
- Wamanripa
- Wank'ayuq Saywa
- Waytani
- Wayunka
- Wila Quta
- Willkarana
- Wiska
- Yana Ranra
- Yana Uqhu
- Yana Urqu
- Yawriwiri
- Yuraq Qaqa
- Yuraq Urqu
- Yuraq Wasina

== Districts ==
The province is divided into seven districts:

- Antabamba
- El Oro
- Huaquirca
- Juan Espinoza Medrano
- Oropesa
- Pachaconas
- Sabaino

== Ethnic groups ==
The people in the province are mainly indigenous citizens of Quechua descent. Quechua is the language which the majority of the population (77.12%) learnt to speak in childhood, 22.26% of the residents started speaking using the Spanish language and 0.28% using Aymara (2007 Peru Census).
