= Saywa Punta =

Mountain in Peru

- Location within Peru

Highest point
- Elevation: 4,900 m (16,100 ft)
- Coordinates: 14°35′35″S 72°40′53″W

Geography
- Location: Peru, Apurímac Region, Antabamba Province
- Parent range: Andes, Wansu

Saywa Punta (Quechua saywa boundary stone, landmark, punta peak, ridge; first, before, in front of, Hispanicized spelling Sayhua Punta) is a mountain in the Wansu mountain range in the Andes of Peru, about 4,900 metres (16,076 ft) high. It lies in the Apurímac Region, Antabamba Province, Antabamba District. Saywa Punta is situated southwest of Hatun Qillqa.
