= Sara Sara (Apurímac) =

Mountain in Peru

- Location within Peru

Highest point
- Elevation: 5,195 m (17,044 ft)
- Coordinates: 14°38′17″S 72°47′17″W

Geography
- Location: Peru, Apurímac Region
- Parent range: Andes, Wansu

Sara Sara (Aymara sara an ounce, Quechua sara maize, the reduplication indicates that there is a group or a complex of something) is a 5,195-metre-high (17,044 ft) mountain in the Wansu mountain range in the Andes of Peru. It is situated in the Apurímac Region, Antabamba Province, in the districts of Antabamba and Juan Espinoza Medrano. Sara Sara lies south of Quri Waraqa and Huch'uy Sara Sara.
