= Santo Tomás, Chumbivilcas =

Santo Tomás
- Town
- Location within Peru
- Coordinates: 14.451°S 72.082°W
- Country: Peru
- Region: Cusco
- Province: Chumbivilcas
- District: Santo Tomás
- Time zone: UTC-5 (PET)

Santo Tomás is a town in southern Peru, capital of Chumbivilcas Province in Cusco Region.

== Climate ==
Climate data for Santo Tomás, elevation 3,212 m (10,538 ft), (1991–2020)
Month	Jan	Feb	Mar	Apr	May	Jun	Jul	Aug	Sep	Oct	Nov	Dec	Year
Mean daily maximum °C (°F)	22.4 (72.3)	22.3 (72.1)	22.3 (72.1)	22.4 (72.3)	22.5 (72.5)	22.1 (71.8)	21.7 (71.1)	23.0 (73.4)	23.6 (74.5)	24.2 (75.6)	24.9 (76.8)	23.5 (74.3)	22.9 (73.2)
Mean daily minimum °C (°F)	7.4 (45.3)	7.6 (45.7)	7.4 (45.3)	5.3 (41.5)	1.2 (34.2)	−1.5 (29.3)	−1.6 (29.1)	−0.2 (31.6)	3.0 (37.4)	4.9 (40.8)	5.3 (41.5)	6.7 (44.1)	3.8 (38.8)
Average precipitation mm (inches)	162.7 (6.41)	181.5 (7.15)	167.0 (6.57)	57.1 (2.25)	8.6 (0.34)	2.1 (0.08)	5.2 (0.20)	6.7 (0.26)	18.5 (0.73)	51.6 (2.03)	56.1 (2.21)	133.6 (5.26)	850.7 (33.49)
Source: National Meteorology and Hydrology Service of Peru
