= Hatun Qillqa =

Mountain in Peru

- Location within Peru

Highest point
- Elevation: 5,000 m (16,000 ft)
- Coordinates: 14°33′32″S 72°39′25″W

Geography
- Location: Peru, Apurímac Region, Antabamba Province
- Parent range: Andes, Wansu

Hatun Qillqa (Quechua hatun big, qillqa graphic sign, writing (the act and art of writing), Hispanicized spelling Jatunquilca) is a mountain in the Wansu mountain range in the Andes of Peru, about 5,000 metres (16,404 ft) high. It is situated in the Apurímac Region, Antabamba Province, Antabamba District. Hatun Qillqa lies southeast of Qillqa, southwest of Sisiwa and Yuraq Urqu (Quechua for "white mountain", Hispanicized Yuraj Orjo) and northwest of Wank'ayuq Saywa.
