= Willkarana =

Mountain in Peru

- Location within Peru

Highest point
- Elevation: 5,300 m (17,400 ft)
- Coordinates: 14°31′29″S 72°32′20″W

Geography
- Location: Peru, Apurímac Region
- Parent range: Andes, Wansu

Willkarana (Aymara willka sun, -rana near, "near the sun", Hispanicized spelling Vilcarana) is a 5,300-metre-high (17,388 ft) mountain in the north of the Wansu mountain range in the Andes of Peru. It is situated in the Apurímac Region, Antabamba Province, Oropesa District.
