= Waytani =

Mountain in Peru

- Location within Peru

Highest point
- Elevation: 5,430 m (17,810 ft)
- Coordinates: 14°39′29″S 72°28′04″W

Geography
- Location: Peru, Apurímac Region, Arequipa Region, Cusco Region
- Parent range: Andes, Wansu

Waytani (Aymara wayta headdress made of feathers or flowers, -ni, a suffix to indicate ownership, 'the one with the decoration on the head', Hispanicized spelling Huaytane) is a mountain in the Wansu mountain range in the Andes of Peru, about 5,430 metres (17,815 ft) high. It is situated in the Apurímac Region, Antabamba Province, Oropesa District, in the Arequipa Region, La Unión Province, Puyca District, and in the Cusco Region, Chumbivilcas Province, Santo Tomás District, south of the mountain Chankuwaña.

== See also ==
- Chankuwaña
- Wamanmarka
