= Quri Waraqa =

Mountain in Peru

- Location within Peru

Highest point
- Elevation: 5,000 m (16,000 ft)
- Coordinates: 14°36′05″S 72°47′10″W

Geography
- Location: Peru, Apurímac Region
- Parent range: Andes, Wansu

Quri Waraqa (Quechua quri gold, waraqa sack, "gold sack", Hispanicized spelling Corihuaraca) or Quri Warak'a (warak'a sling or slingshot, "gold sling" or "gold slingshot") is a mountain in the Wansu mountain range in the Andes of Peru, about 5,000 metres (16,404 ft) high. It is situated in the Apurímac Region, Antabamba Province, in the districts of Antabamba and Juan Espinoza Medrano. Quri Waraqa lies north of Sara Sara, Panti Pata and Huch'uy Sara Sara.
