= Chankuwaña =

Mountain in Peru

- Location within Peru

Highest point
- Elevation: 5,331 m (17,490 ft)
- Coordinates: 14°37′23″S 72°28′09″W

Geography
- Location: Peru, Apurímac Region, Cusco Region
- Parent range: Andes, Wansu

Climbing
- First ascent: 1970

Chankuwaña (Aymara for throw something so that people can scramble or fight for it, Hispanicized spelling Chancoaña, Chancohuana, Chancohuaña, Chancohuañachico, Chancohuana Chico) is a mountain in the Wansu mountain range in the Andes of Peru, about 5,331 metres (17,490 ft) high. It is situated in the Apurímac Region, Antabamba Province, Oropesa District, and in the Cusco Region, Chumbivilcas Province, Santo Tomás District, north of the mountain Waytani and southeast of the mountain Wayunka.

== See also ==
- Wamanmarka
