= Quri Pawkara =

Mountain in Peru

- Location within Peru

Highest point
- Elevation: 5,000 m (16,000 ft)
- Coordinates: 14°34′34″S 72°49′14″W

Geography
- Location: Peru, Apurímac Region
- Parent range: Andes, Wansu

Quri Pawkara (Quechua quri gold, pawkara a species of bird, (possibly Russet-backed oropendola) also spelled Coripaucara) is a mountain in the Wansu mountain range in the Andes of Peru, about 5,000 metres (16,404 ft) high. It is situated in the Apurímac Region, Antabamba Province, in the districts of Antabamba and Juan Espinoza Medrano. Its three peaks lie in a row from north to south northwest of Quri Waraqa.
