= Qañawimayu =

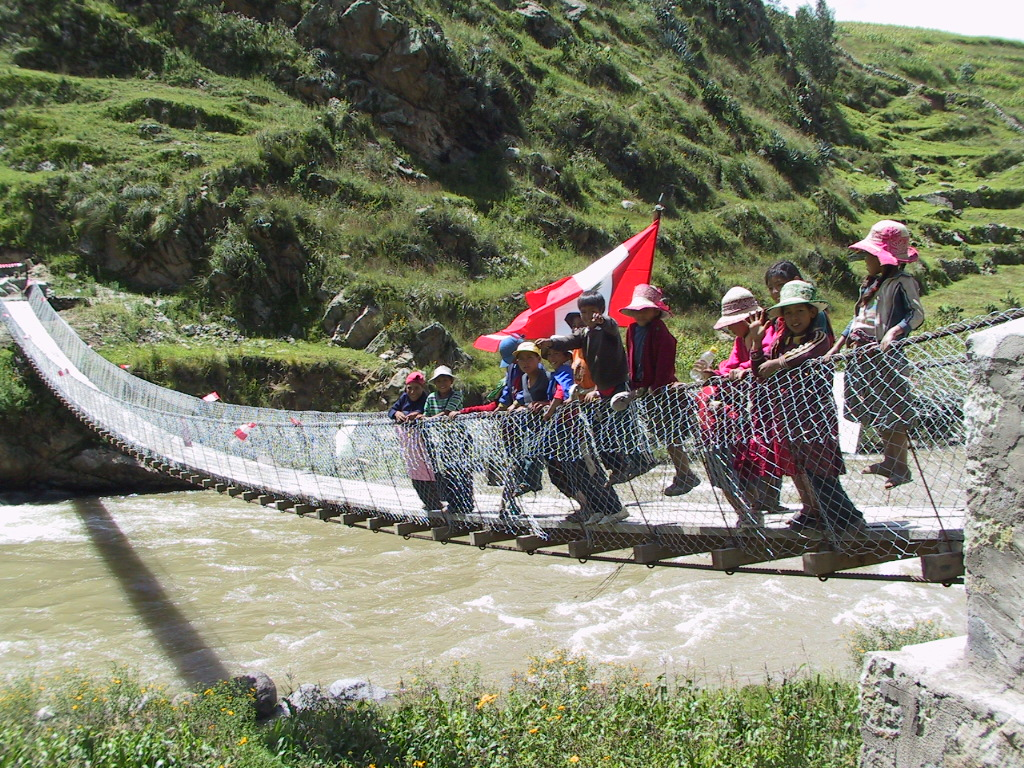
- Children are waving the Peruvian flag on the new footbridge across Qañawimayu (Santo Tomás River) in Qullpatumayku, Chumbivilcas Province
- Etymology: Quechua

Location
- Country: Peru
- Region: Apurímac Region, Cusco Region

Physical characteristics
- Source
  - location: Santo Tomás District
  - coordinates: 14°48′59″S 72°22′57″W
- Mouth: Apurímac River

Qañawimayu (Quechua qañawi, qañiwa, qañawa a cereal from the family Chenopodiaceae, mayu river, "qañawi river", hispanicized spelling Cañahuymayo) which upstream is called Cayacti and downstream successively is named Jaraucata, Qullpa (Collpa), Yawina (Yavina) and Santo Tomás River is a river in Peru. It is located in the Apurímac Region, Cotabambas Province, and in the Cusco Region, Chumbivilcas Province and Paruro Province. It belongs to the Apurímac watershed.

Qañawimayu originates in the south-west of the Santo Tomás District in the Chumbivilcas Province of the Cusco Region between the mountains Minasniyuq and Qullpa K'uchu at a height of 4,940 metres (16,207 ft). At first it flows northwards. South of the mountain Wamanripa it turns to the northeast. It receives waters from the confluence with Sinqa Wayq'u. Near the town of Santo Tomás it turns to the north again. The confluence with the Apurímac River is at a mountain named Tinkuq (Tincoc) on the border of the districts of Tambobamba, Ccapi and Huanoquite.
