= Espinar =

Espinar may refer to:

- Espinar Province, one of thirteen provinces in the Cusco Region of Peru
  - Espinar District, one of eight districts of Espinar Province
  - Espinar, an alternative name of Yauri, Peru, the capital of Espinar Province
- El Espinar, a municipality in the province of Segovia, Castile and León, Spain
- Fort Espinar, the current name of Fort Gulick, a former U.S. Army base in Panama
