= Wanu Wanu =

Mountain in Peru

- Location within Peru

Highest point
- Elevation: 4,800 m (15,700 ft)
- Coordinates: 15°11′34″S 71°02′11″W

Naming
- Language of name: Aymara, Quechua

Geography
- Location: Peru, Cusco Region
- Parent range: Andes

Wanu Wanu (Aymara and Quechua wanu dung, fertilizer, "a lot of dung", hispanicized spelling Huanu Huanu) is a mountain in the Andes of Peru, about 4,800 m (15,700 ft) high. It is located in the Cusco Region, Espinar Province, on the border of the districts of Condoroma and Ocoruro. It lies northeast of Atawallpa and southeast of Hatun Chhuka.
