= Hatun Chhuka =

Mountain in Peru

- Location within Peru

Highest point
- Elevation: 4,800 m (15,700 ft)
- Coordinates: 15°10′35″S 71°02′57″W

Naming
- Language of name: Quechua

Geography
- Location: Peru, Cusco Region
- Parent range: Andes

Hatun Chhuka (Quechua hatun big, chhuka angle, "big angle", Hispanicized spelling Hatunchuca) is a mountain in the Andes of Peru, about 4,800 m (15,700 ft) high. It is located in the Cusco Region, Espinar Province, Ocoruro District. It lies north of Atawallpa.
