= Aguillane =

Mountain in Peru

- Location within Peru

Highest point
- Elevation: 5,000 m (16,000 ft)
- Coordinates: 15°14′39″S 71°03′22″W

Naming
- Language of name: Aymara

Geography
- Location: Peru, Cusco Region
- Parent range: Andes

Aguillane or Aquillane (possibly from Aymara akilla silver bowl (for a beverage), -ni a suffix, "the one with a silver bowl (or silver bowls)") is a mountain in the Andes of Peru, about 5,000 m (16,000 ft) high. It is located in the Cusco Region, Espinar Province, Condoroma District. Aguillane lies southwest of Atawallpa.
