= Janq'u Q'awa =

Janq'u Q'awa (Aymara for "white brook" or "white ravine", also spelled Aconcagua, Aconcahua, Ancocahua, Ancoccahua, Ancojahua) may refer to:

- Aconcagua, a mountain in the Mendoza Province, Argentina
- Janq'u Q'awa (Arequipa), a mountain in the Arequipa Region, Peru
- Janq'u Q'awa (Cusco), a mountain in the Cusco Region, Peru
- Janq'u Q'awa (El Collao), a mountain in the El Collao Province, Puno Region, Peru
- Janq'u Q'awa (Melgar), a mountain in the Melgar Province, Puno Region, Peru
