= Yauri =

Yauri can mean:

- Yauri, Nigeria, a local government area of Kebbi State
- Yauri, Peru, a town in Cusco Region, Peru
- Yauri Emirate, in Nigeria's Kebbi State
