= Janq'u Q'awa (Cusco) =

Mountain in Peru

- Location within Peru

Highest point
- Elevation: 4,800 m (15,700 ft)
- Coordinates: 15°13′35″S 71°08′01″W

Geography
- Location: Peru, Cusco Region
- Parent range: Andes

Janq'u Q'awa (Aymara janq'u white, q'awa little river, ditch, crevice, fissure, gap in the earth, "white brook" or "white ravine", Hispanicized spelling Ancocahua) is a mountain in the Andes of Peru, about 4,800 m (15,700 ft) high. It is located in the Cusco Region, Espinar Province, on the border of the districts of Condoroma and Ocoruro. Janq'u Q'awa lies southwest of Isankani and Aqhu Phichaqa.
