= Oscar Mollohuanca =

mayor of Espinar Province

Personal details
- Known for: 2012 arrest

Oscar Mollohuanca was the mayor of the Espinar Province of Peru. On 30 May 2012, he was arrested by the national government and accused of inciting protests against an expansion of a copper mine owned by Xstrata. He was conditionally released on 13 July. On March 7, 2022, he was found dead near his house, the circumstances of his death led to the assumption that he was murdered.

== Role in Tintaya strike ==
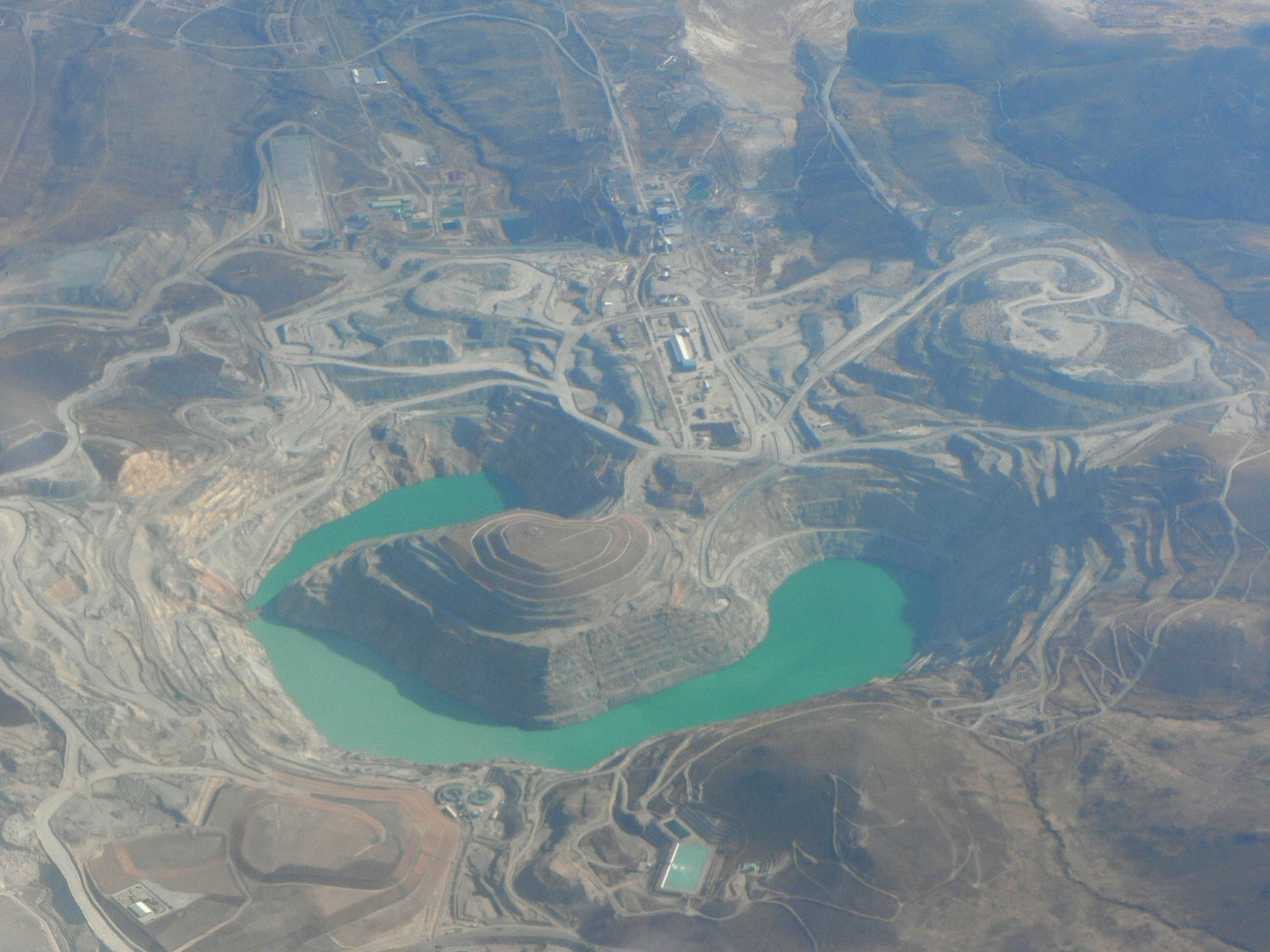
Tintaya copper mine as seen from the air

On 21 May 2012, agricultural leadership in Espinar Province announced a strike against the planned expansion of Tintaya mine, a copper mine owned by the Swiss corporation Xstrata (now merged with Glencore). The leaders' demands included higher environmental standards, more money for area development, and independent oversight of the mine. The Los Angeles Times described Mollohuanca as "one of the principal leaders" of the strike.

Strikers occupied the roads to the mine over the following week, blocking all access. In response, President Ollanta Humala declared a state of emergency in the province, suspending constitutional rights, and deployed police commandos against the strikers. Two civilians were killed in the resulting clashes, and 70 police officers were injured.

== Arrest ==
On 30 May, Mollohuanca asked the national government to mediate talks between Xstrata and the strikers. The following day, he was arrested at Espinar City Hall by more than a dozen police officers. He was then transferred to the jail at Cuzco and the following day to a jail in Ica, a city on the other side of the country.

Authorities accused Mollohuanca of using public funds to support the protests as well as inciting violence, and a judge ordered him to serve five months of "preventative" detention while the accusations against him were investigated. Mollohuanca described his detention as "surely handed down because of pressure from above, because what we have here at play are big interests from, for example, mining companies".

Amnesty International called for a letter-writing campaign in response to the arrest, urging authorities to either charge Mollohuanca with a criminal offense or release him immediately. Peruvian human rights groups also appealed Mollohuanca's case, arguing that his detention was arbitrary as he had not been given a trial. Vigils and protests were held on his behalf throughout the country.

On 13 June, an appeals court ordered his release, though he remained under criminal investigation. Addressing the media after being freed, Mollohuanca protested his "arbitrary" arrest and called for "dialogue to tackle the area's environmental and social problems".

== Political views ==
Mollohuanca belonged to the Tierra y Libertad party.
