= Puka Punchu =

Puka Punchu may refer to:

- Puka Punchu (Cusco)
- Puka Punchu (Puno)
