= Peru and the International Monetary Fund =

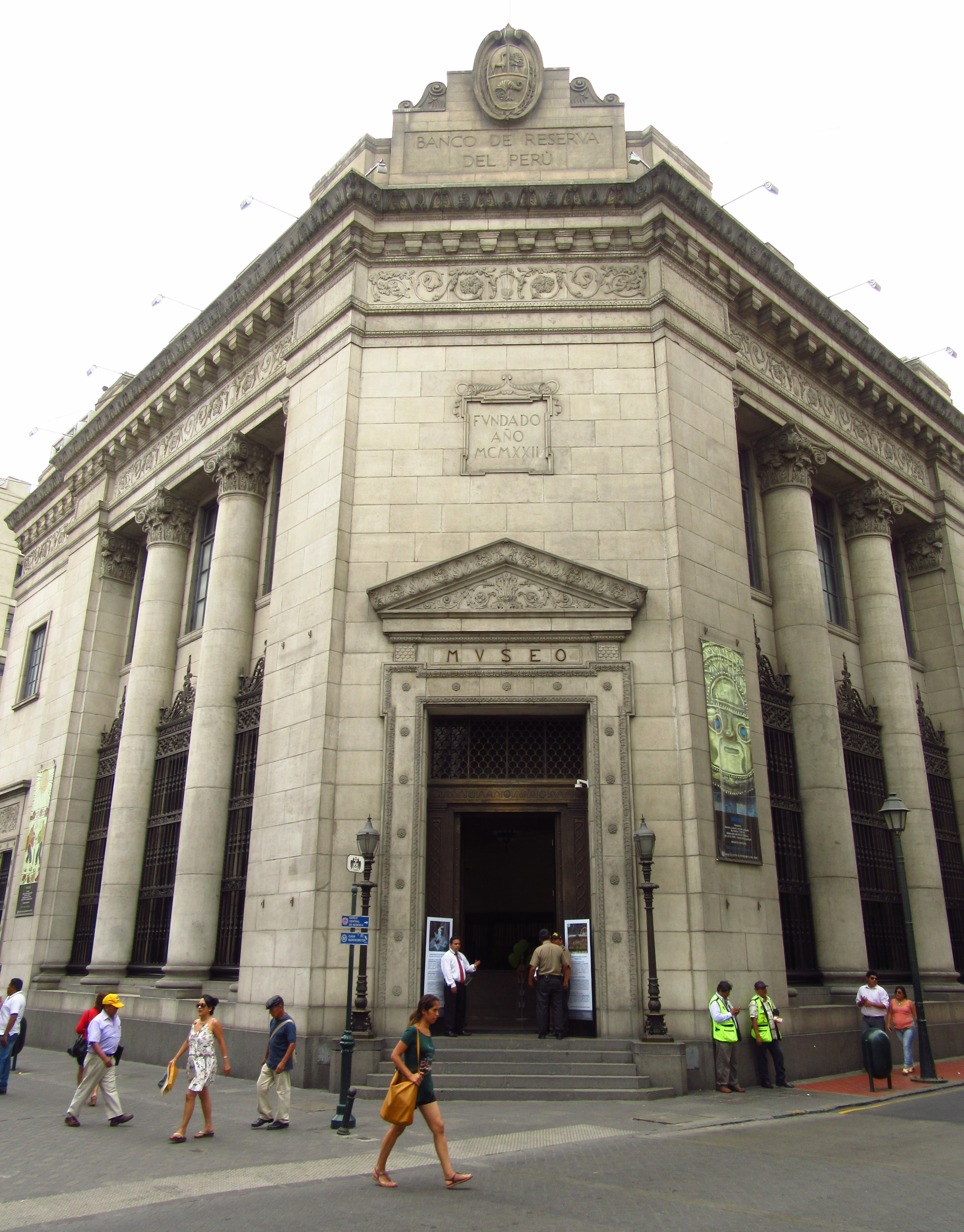
Peru's central bank, whose policies are thought to be a major driver of growth by the IMF.

Peru and the International Monetary Fund (IMF) have a long history together. The country first joined on December 31, 1945, shortly after the Fund's establishment. It has had 27 arrangements with the organization during its membership. The country was dogged by financial mismanagement during the latter half of the twentieth century, culminating in a brief falling-out with the IMF. It has since become one of its most orthodox followers in Latin America. It currently has a quota of 1.3 billion Special Drawing Rights.

== Post-war history (1945-1990) ==
From 1945 to 1970, Peru experienced high growth through its natural resource exports, checkered by periodic balance of payments crises. It was a frequent user of the IMF's Stand-By Arrangement. Import substitution policies ramped up during the presidency of Belaunde and later, under the Velasco military dictatorship. The country imported more than it exported in order to promote manufacturing, which grew as a proportion of GDP. In turn, foreign exchange reserves were drained. Exogenous shocks in the form of the 1970s energy crisis, which affected the entire region, caused Peru's finances to spiral. The government was initially hesitant to adopt IMF-sponsored structural adjustment for loans. They caved as their current account deficit worsened. The first wave of neoliberal reforms fixed their balance of payments problems, but proved to be very politically unpopular as it failed to contain inflation. Civilian rule was restored in 1980, once more under Belaunde.

The next government was similarly unsuccessful at implementing a more ambitious version of these reforms. There was a lack of political will within the Peruvian bureaucracy. Most of the privatizations and related infrastructure investments were left unfinished. Beyond fueling insurgencies by the Shining Path, this prompted a heterodox backlash under the auspices of Alan García. He publicly assailed the IMF in his rhetoric and sought to promote self-sufficiency through exchange rate manipulation and price controls to stimulate exports. Debt servicing limits would eventually make the country ineligible for IMF loans in 1986. Meanwhile, expansionary policies resulted in hyperinflation. The economy severely contracted, having the same GDP in 1990 as in 1975.

== "Fujishock" and the Peruvian miracle (1990-2014) ==
Under the authoritarian presidency of Alberto Fujimori (1990-2000), Peru once more underwent a slate of reforms to stabilize the economy. These policies, collectively known as Fujishock, were drawn from and supported by the IMF. Meanwhile, a new constitution protected the central bank's autonomy. After making overdue payments to the international financial community, the country regained its eligibility to borrow directly from them through an Extended Fund Facility. On the other hand, there was a short-term decline in real earnings and rise in unemployment, done in order to bring down excess demand thought to be inflationary. Cholera and tuberculosis outbreaks overlapped with greater poverty, with the working class being hit especially hard. Later, structural reforms to privatize had the unintended consequence of fueling coca production and enhancing Peru's role as part of the international drug trade. Finally, Fujimori's regime was deeply harmful to democratic institutions, as he performed a self-coup with the backing of the military in order to stay in power.

By the 2000s, Peru maintained an international credit rating of BBB− and above through its low inflation, high exports, and buildup of foreign exchange reserves. It was able to weather the 2008 financial crisis, growing at 9.8%. The mining sector was particularly dynamic during this timeframe, being the primary beneficiary of a global commodity super-cycle, and it continues to account up to 15% of the nation's GDP. The ensuing growth lasted into the early 2010s, averaging more than 6% between 2004 and 2014. Members of the international finance community like the IMF have called it the Peruvian miracle. Nevertheless, the country has struggled with diversification, and large private mining companies are juxtaposed with a lot of unproductive micro-enterprises in the informal sector. The economy's share of manufacturing has decreased, which echoes concerns about premature deindustrialization in Latin America.

== Recent history (2014-present) ==
Since 2014, both real and potential Peruvian growth have declined to about 2-3%. The economy has remained largely insulated from political turmoil that started in 2016. A flexible credit line of 600% of Peru's quota was accepted in May 2020 to protect against the COVID-19 pandemic, which had reversed some of the country's progress against poverty. This was lowered to 300% in May 2022, and eventually allowed to expire in May 2024. The IMF continues to commend the country's macroeconomic fundamentals, such as low inflation, low public debt, and tight monetary policies, in the face of numerous endogenous and exogeneous shocks like the Russian invasion of Ukraine.

Commentators in both the IMF and the Peruvian government expressed optimism about growth based on the opening of the Quellaveco mine, as well as the "Con Punche Perú" program, an economic stimulus plan geared towards agriculture and tourism. However, this has mostly failed to reinvigorate the private sector.

=== Challenges ===
While neoliberal, free market policies have kept the economy stable, they have also fostered a consensus against state interventionism of all forms. This has left the government with a diminished capacity to address other structural factors like inequality and corruption, which threaten Peru's development. The pandemic highlighted this, where a lack of access to ICU beds and medical supplies led to the country having the highest COVID-19 death rate in the world.

Most of the population continues in work the informal sector, and consequently, the country is plagued by poor total factor productivity growth compared to the regional average, even in profitable sectors like mining. Its regulatory framework creates incentives against formalization and upscaling in small and medium-sized firms, which causes the economy to fail to integrate them. Technology and knowledge diffusion lacks. A gap between formal and informal sectors is most evident in the adoption of artificial intelligence, which is comparable to developed economies in the formal sector, but stays low as a whole. Furthermore, the country is among the most vulnerable to climate change and El Niño in South America, especially as public investment has not risen to facilitate adaptation. All of these factors pose headwinds for Peru's future economic prospects.
