= Coporaque District, Espinar =

Coordinates: 14.7988°S 71.5315°W

Coporaque
- District
- Interactive map of Coporaque
- Country: Peru
- Region: Cusco
- Province: Espinar
- Founded: August 29, 1834
- Capital: Coporaque

Government
  - Mayor: Tito Benedicto Ccahua Chara

Area
  - Total: 1,564.46 km^{2} (604.04 sq mi)
- Elevation: 3,942 m (12,933 ft)

Population (Peru 2017 Census)
  - Total: 9,627
  - Density: 6.154/km^{2} (15.94/sq mi)
- Time zone: UTC-5 (PET)
- UBIGEO: 080803

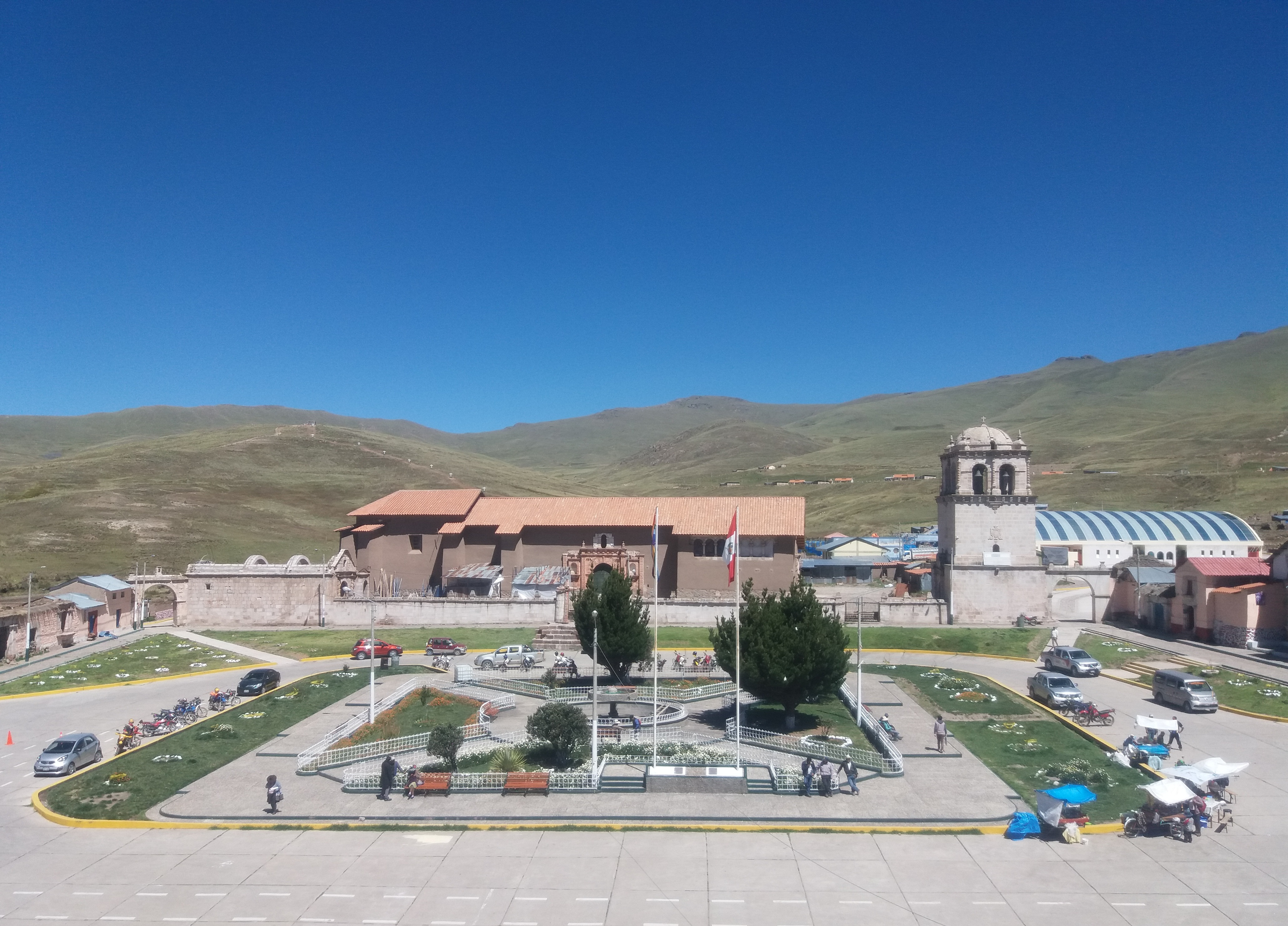
Main Square of the District of Coporaque - Espinar - Cusco - 2016

Coporaque District is one of eight districts of the province Espinar in Peru.

== Geography ==
Some of the highest mountains of the district are listed below:

- Anta Anta
- Anta Qullu
- Chunkara Qaqa
- Jichu Qullu
- Kiswarani Q'asa
- Kuntur Uma
- Muyu Qaqa
- Pilluni
- Puka Puka
- Puka Q'asa
- Pukara
- Pumanuta
- Qullpa Pata
- Salla Saywa
- Siq'i Urqu
- Sura Quta
- Sura Urqu
- Sura Uma
- Taypi Tira
- Urqu K'uchu
- Waman Wachana
- Waylla Apachita
- Waylluma
- Wayna Sinqa

== Ethnic groups ==
The people in the district are mainly indigenous citizens of Quechua descent. Quechua is the language which the majority of the population (93.04%) learnt to speak in childhood, 6.73% of the residents started speaking using the Spanish language (2007 Peru Census). Coporaque is looked upon as one of the poorest districts of the country.

== See also ==
- Mawk'allaqta
