= Ocoruro District =

Ocoruro Uqururu
- District
- Interactive map of Ocoruro
- Country: Peru
- Region: Cusco
- Province: Espinar
- Founded: January 2, 1857
- Capital: Ocoruro

Government
  - Mayor: Adolfo Alfredo Huarza Minauro

Area
  - Total: 353.15 km^{2} (136.35 sq mi)
- Elevation: 4,093 m (13,428 ft)

Population (2005 census)
  - Total: 1,588
  - Density: 4.497/km^{2} (11.65/sq mi)
- Time zone: UTC-5 (PET)
- UBIGEO: 080804

Ocoruro (Hispanicized spelling) or Uqururu (Aymara and Quechua for Mimulus glabratus) is one of eight districts of the Espinar Province in Peru.

== Geography ==
Some of the highest mountains of the district are listed below:

- Allqamarini
- Apachita
- Aqhu Phichaqa
- Atawallpa
- Atawallpa Much'u
- Ch'uwañuma
- Hatun Chhuka
- Huch'uy Mut'u
- Isankani
- Janq'u Q'awa
- Kuntur Sayana
- Machu Kunturuma
- Mut'u
- Pilluni
- Qaqa Urqu
- Q'ara Qullu
- Q'atawini
- Salla
- Tarujani
- Wallqa
- Wanu Wanu
- Yana Urqu

== Ethnic groups ==
The people in the district are mainly indigenous citizens of Quechua descent. Quechua is the language which the majority of the population (80.95%) learnt to speak in childhood, 18.73% of the residents started speaking using the Spanish language (2007 Peru Census).
