= Kiswarani Q'asa =

Mountain in Peru

- Location within Peru

Highest point
- Elevation: 4,862.8 m (15,954 ft)
- Coordinates: 14°45′57″S 71°49′30″W

Geography
- Location: Peru, Cusco Region, Espinar Province
- Parent range: Andes

Kiswarani Q'asa (Aymara kiswara Buddleja incana, -ni a suffix to indicate ownership, kiswarani "the one with kiswara", Quechua q'asa mountain pass, "Kiswarani mountain pass" or "mountain pass with kiswara", Hispanicized spelling Quisuaraniccasa) is a mountain in the Andes of Peru. Its summit reaches about 4,862.8 m (15,954 ft) above sea level. The mountain is located in the Cusco Region, Espinar Province, Coporaque District.

Kiswarani Q'asa lies on a long ridge which extents from west to east along the river Kirwamayu (Querhuamayo) south of it. Kiswarani (Quishuarani) is the name of a stream which flows from the ridge down to Kirwamayu. The peaks east of Kiswarani Q'asa are named Wamanwachana (Huamanhuachana) and Kirwa (Querhua).
