= Mullu Q'awa =

Archaeological site in Peru

- Interactive map of Mullu Q'awa
- 14°47′08″S 71°17′42″W
- Periods: pre-Inca
- Location: Peru, Cusco Region, Espinar Province
- Region: Andes

Site notes
- Height: 4,000 m (13,000 ft)
- Area: 12 ha (30 acres)

Mullu Q'awa (Aymara mullu colored stone like a coral with which they make necklaces, q'awa little river, ditch, crevice, fissure, gap in the earth, hispanicized spellings Molloqhawa, Muyuqhawa) is an archaeological site in Peru on a mountain of that name. It is located in the Cusco Region, Espinar Province, Alto Pichigua District. It lies near the village of Mullu Q'awa (Molloccahua, Molloqhawa). It is situated on top of the mountain at a height of about 4,000 m (13,000 ft).

The site was declared a National Cultural Heritage (Patrimonio Cultural) by Resolution No. 954-2010- INC on April 27, 2010.
