= Minpeco =

Peruvian mining company

- Company type: Private – S.A.
- Industry: Mining
- Founder: Government of Peru
- Headquarters: Lima, Peru

Minpeco S.A. is Peruvian mineral company. It was created as a state-owned company, Empresa Comercializadora de Minerales or Minero Perú Comercial, in the 1970s, and had a monopoly on the export of minerals and ore concentrate produced by large-scale mining in Peru. The company emerged after a series of mining law reforms in Peru in 1969 and 1970 which established the Peruvian state as the dominant actor in the mining industry. In 1984 it had agreements to process ore in Complejo Metalúrgico de Karachipampa in Bolivia.

In 1988 Minpeco obtained a compensation from the Hunt brothers (Nelson Bunker Hunt, William Herbert Hunt and Lamar Hunt), who were found responsible for civil cases of conspiracy to corner the market in silver. The company was to receive $134 million in compensation from the brothers as a compensation for lost money. Minpeco had originally sought $450 million in compensation.

Minpeco was privatized in 1992 during the government of Alberto Fujimori.

== See also ==
- Silver Thursday – 1980 crash in the U.S. commodity markets for silver
