= Chuqi Pirwa (Cusco-Puno) =

Mountain in Peru

- Location within Peru

Highest point
- Elevation: 5,200 m (17,100 ft)
- Coordinates: 15°16′21″S 70°58′31″W

Geography
- Location: Peru, Cusco Region, Puno Region
- Parent range: Andes

Chuqi Pirwa (Aymara chuqi gold, pirwa, piwra granary, Quechua chuqi, metal, every kind of precious metal; gold (<Aymara), pirwa deposit, "gold granary" or "metal deposit", Hispanicized spelling Choquepirhua) is a mountain in the Andes of Peru, about 5,200 m (17,100 ft) high. It is situated in the Cusco Region, Espinar Province, Condoroma District, and in the Puno Region, Lampa Province, Ocuviri District. Chuqi Pirwa lies southwest of Sawanani Lake (Saguanani) and northwest of Qullqi Q'awa.
