= Isankani =

Mountain in Peru

- Location within Peru

Highest point
- Elevation: 4,925 m (16,158 ft)
- Coordinates: 15°12′18″S 71°05′31″W

Geography
- Location: Peru, Cusco Region
- Parent range: Andes

Isankani (Quechua isanka basket; colander, Aymara -ni a suffix, "the one with the basket (or colander)", Hispanicized spelling Isangane) is a 4,925-metre-high (16,158 ft) mountain in the Andes of Peru. It is located in the Cusco Region, Espinar Province, on the border of the districts of Condoroma and Ocoruro. Isankani lies east of Aqhu Phichaqa.
