= Qullqi Q'awa =

Mountain in Peru

- Location within Peru

Highest point
- Elevation: 5,207 m (17,083 ft)
- Coordinates: 15°18′24″S 70°57′55″W

Geography
- Location: Peru, Cusco Region, Espinar Province
- Parent range: Andes

Qullqi Q'awa (Aymara qullqi silver, q'awa little river, ditch, crevice, fissure, gap in the earth, "silver brook" or "silver ravine", Hispanicized spelling Colqueccahua) is a 5,207-metre-high (17,083 ft) mountain in the Andes of Peru. It is situated in the Cusco Region, Espinar Province, in the west of the Condoroma District. Qullqi Q'awa lies near the border with the Puno Region, southwest of Sawanani Lake (Saguanani) and southeast of Chuqi Pirwa.
