= Puka Punchu (Cusco) =

Mountain in Peru

- Location within Peru

Highest point
- Elevation: 5,000 m (16,000 ft)
- Coordinates: 15°16′31″S 71°01′48″W

Naming
- Language of name: Quechua

Geography
- Location: Peru, Cusco Region
- Parent range: Andes

Puka Punchu (Quechua puka red, punchu poncho, "red poncho" or Hispanicized spelling Puca Puncho) is a mountain in the Andes of Peru, about 5,000 m (16,000 ft) high. It is located in the Cusco Region, Espinar Province, Condoroma District. Puka Punchu lies southwest of Yuraq Q'asa and north of Chuqi Pirwa.
