= Kunturi (Cusco) =

Mountain in Peru

- Location within Peru

Highest point
- Elevation: 5,149.6 m (16,895 ft)
- Coordinates: 15°18′35″S 71°5′23″W

Geography
- Location: Peru, Cusco Region, Espinar Province
- Parent range: Andes

Kunturi (Aymara for condor, Hispanicized spelling Condori) is a mountain in the Cusco Region in the Andes of Peru, about 5,149.6 metres (16,895 ft) high. It is situated in the Espinar Province, Condoroma District. Kunturi lies south-east of Condoroma and the mountain Yanaqaqa (Yanacaca) and north of the mountain Pilluni (Pillone).
