= Alto Pichigua District =

Coordinates: 14.7777°S 71.2514°W

Alto Pichigua
- District
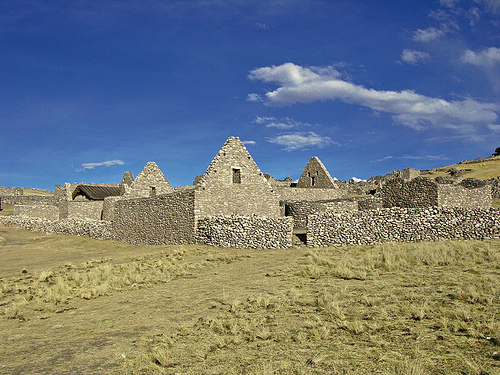
- The archaeological site of K'anamarka in the Alto Pichigua District
- Interactive map of Alto Pichigua
- Country: Peru
- Region: Cusco
- Province: Espinar
- Founded: October 14, 1994
- Capital: Accocunca

Government
  - Mayor: Hugo Huarancca Katata

Area
  - Total: 375.89 km^{2} (145.13 sq mi)
- Elevation: 4,000 m (13,000 ft)

Population (2005 census)
  - Total: 2,905
  - Density: 7.728/km^{2} (20.02/sq mi)
- Time zone: UTC-5 (PET)
- UBIGEO: 080808

Alto Pichigua District is one of eight districts of the Espinar Province in Peru.

== Geography ==
One of the highest peaks of the district is Wamanlipani at approximately 4,800 m (15,700 ft). Other mountains are listed below:

- Allqamarina
- Chilla Tira
- Chuqita
- Ch'iyar Jaqhi
- Ch'ulluni
- Lluxita
- Muru Sirk'a
- Qillqa
- Qaqa Wasi
- Qayqu
- Qurani
- Saywa Sirk'a
- Sirk'a Qaqa
- Tara Qaqa
- Tarukayuq
- Wisa Punta
- Yana Urqu
- Yaritani

== Ethnic groups ==
The people in the district are mainly indigenous citizens of Quechua descent. Quechua is the language which the majority of the population (91.87%) learnt to speak in childhood, 7.88% of the residents started speaking using the Spanish language (2007 Peru Census).

== See also ==
- K'anamarka
- Mullu Q'awa
