= Pallpata District =

Coordinates: 14.8931°S 71.2106°W

Pallpata
- District
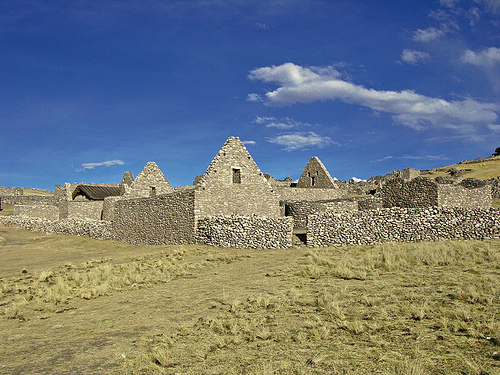
- Interactive map of Pallpata
- Country: Peru
- Region: Cusco
- Province: Espinar
- Founded: November 17, 1917
- Capital: Hector Tejeda

Government
  - Mayor: Melecio Saico Ccolque

Area
  - Total: 815.56 km^{2} (314.89 sq mi)
- Elevation: 3,980 m (13,060 ft)

Population (2005 census)
  - Total: 6,367
  - Density: 7.807/km^{2} (20.22/sq mi)
- Time zone: UTC-5 (PET)
- UBIGEO: 080805

Pallpata District is one of eight districts of the Espinar Province in Peru.

== Geography ==
One of the highest peaks of the district is Aqhuyani at approximately 4,800 m (15,700 ft). Other mountains are listed below:

- Chuqichampi
- Ch'iwani
- Ch'iyara
- Ch'uxña Q'awa
- Ch'iyar Jaqhi
- Hatun Kunka
- Inka Pirqa
- Jayuni
- Llulluch'ani
- Kuntur Pukyu
- Kuntur Sayana
- Pampa Quta
- Pichaqani
- Pinkilluni
- Pirwa Pirwa
- Pukara
- Qillqa
- Qaqa Urqu
- Q'ara Sirk'a Urqu
- Saywa Sirk'a
- Saywani
- Taruka Marka
- Tarukayuq
- Wanakuyuq
- Waña Quta
- Waylla Pata
- Wayllani
- Yana Urqu
- Yaritani

== Ethnic groups ==
The people in the district are mainly indigenous citizens of Quechua descent. Quechua is the language which the majority of the population (69.76%) learnt to speak in childhood, 29.94% of the residents started speaking using the Spanish language (2007 Peru Census).
