= Condoroma District =

Coordinates: 15.2438°S 71.0864°W

Condoroma Kunturuma
- District
- Interactive map of Condoroma
- Country: Peru
- Region: Cusco
- Province: Espinar
- Founded: August 29, 1834
- Capital: Condoroma

Government
  - Mayor: Bartolome Cruz Orosco

Area
  - Total: 513.36 km^{2} (198.21 sq mi)
- Elevation: 4,737 m (15,541 ft)

Population (2005 census)
  - Total: 1,589
  - Density: 3.095/km^{2} (8.017/sq mi)
- Time zone: UTC-5 (PET)
- UBIGEO: 080802

Condoroma District is one of eight districts of the province Espinar in Peru.

== Geography ==
Some of the highest mountains of the district are listed below:

- Akillani
- Aqhu Phichaqa
- Atawallpa
- Atawallpa Much'u
- Chuqi Pirwa
- Isankani
- Janq'u Q'awa
- Japu Apachita
- Kunturi
- Misa Urqu
- Pawsa Urqu
- Pilluni
- Puka Punchu
- Qullqi Q'awa
- Uturunku Pata
- Wanu Wanu
- Waylla Tira
- Yana Qaqa
- Yuraq Q'asa

== Ethnic groups ==
The people in the district are mainly indigenous citizens of Quechua descent. Quechua is the language which the majority of the population (86.26%) learnt to speak in childhood, 13.56% of the residents started speaking using the Spanish language (2007 Peru Census).
