= Suyckutambo District =

Coordinates: 15.0689°S 71.7479°W

Suyckutambo
- District
- Interactive map of Suyckutambo
- Country: Peru
- Region: Cusco
- Province: Espinar
- Founded: March 17, 1961
- Capital: Suyckutambo

Government
  - Mayor: Froelan Taype Ala

Area
  - Total: 652.13 km^{2} (251.79 sq mi)
- Elevation: 4,801 m (15,751 ft)

Population (2005 census)
  - Total: 3,211
  - Density: 4.924/km^{2} (12.75/sq mi)
- Time zone: UTC-5 (PET)
- UBIGEO: 080807

Suyckutambo District is one of eight districts of the Espinar Province in Peru.

== Geography ==
One of the highest peaks of the district is Chila at approximately 5,000 m (16,000 ft). Other mountains are listed below:

- Ayrampu
- Chillwa Q'asa
- Chuqi Tampu
- Ch'iqu Rumi
- Hatun Pukara
- Hatun Qaqa
- Jichu Qullu
- Pilluni
- Puka Urqu
- Pukara
- Pukara Pata
- Qallu Q'asa
- Qayqu
- Saywa
- Sunqu
- Tiklla Q'awa
- Wallatani
- Wankara
- Wayna Kunturi
- Wila Kunka
- Wit'u Pata
- Yana Urqu
- Yaritayuq
- Yuraq Saywa

== Ethnic groups ==
The people in the district are mainly indigenous citizens of Quechua descent. Quechua is the language which the majority of the population (91.54%) learnt to speak in childhood, 8.00% of the residents started speaking using the Spanish language (2007 Peru Census).

== See also ==
- Mawk'allaqta
- Taqrachullu
