= Economic policy of the Alberto Fujimori administration =

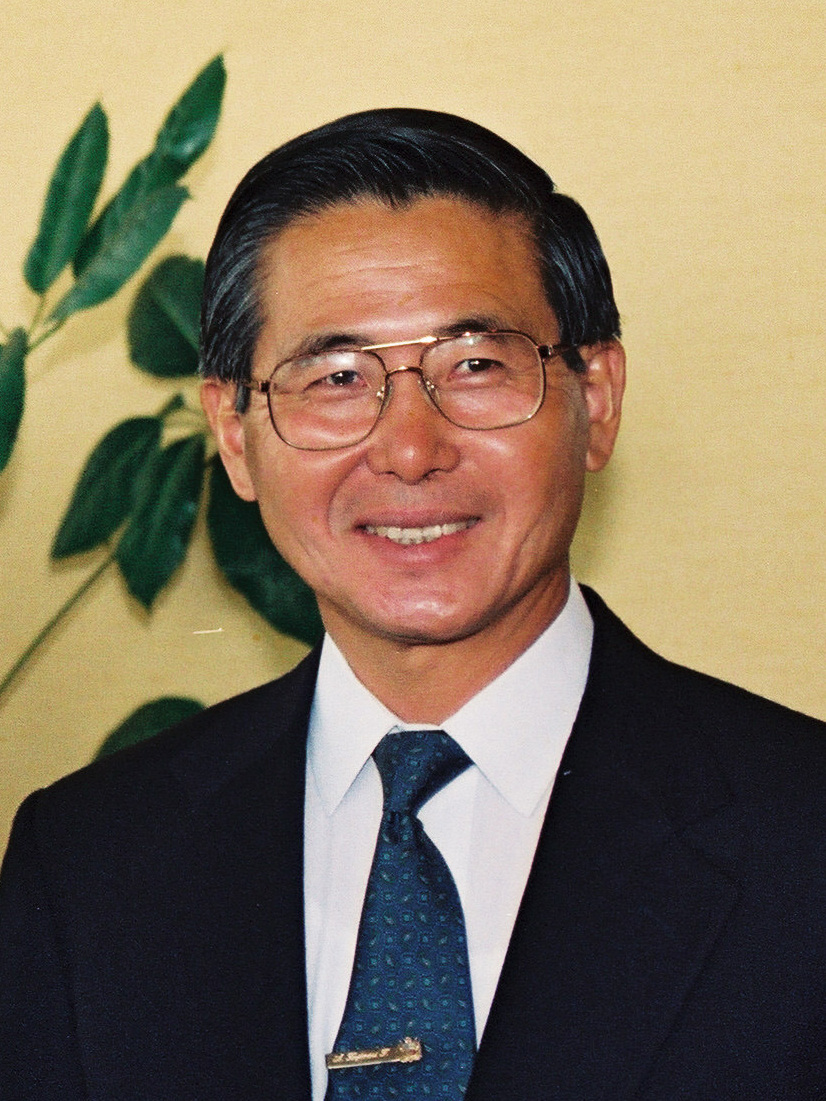
Alberto Fujimori in October 1991

Alberto Fujimori served as the 54th President of Peru from 28 July 1990 to 22 November 2000. A controversial figure, Fujimori has been credited with the creation of Fujimorism, defeating the Shining Path insurgency in Peru and restoring its macroeconomic stability. However, he was criticized for his authoritarian way of ruling the country (especially after 1992) and was accused of human rights violations. Even amid his prosecution in 2008 for crimes against humanity relating to his presidency, two-thirds of Peruvians polled voiced approval for his leadership in that period.

Fujimori's economic policy was largely adopted from the advice of Peruvian economist Hernando de Soto, who prescribed economic guidelines – including the loosening of economic regulation, the introduction of austerity measures and the utilization of neoliberal policies – that were ultimately adopted by the Fujimori administration and established in the 1993 Constitution of Peru. Eventually, the policies resulted in Peru becoming macro-economically stable and gave way to the strongest surge in economic growth in Peru following the period of price controls and increased regulation established during the Lost Decade.

== Background ==
A dark horse candidate, Fujimori won the 1990 presidential election under the banner of the new party Cambio 90 ("cambio" meaning "change"), beating world-renowned writer Mario Vargas Llosa in a surprising upset. He capitalized on profound disenchantment with previous president Alan García and his American Popular Revolutionary Alliance party (APRA). He exploited popular distrust of Vargas Llosa's identification with the existing Peruvian political establishment, and uncertainty about Vargas Llosa's plans for neoliberal economic reforms. Fujimori won much support from the poor, who had been frightened by Vargas Llosa's austerity proposals.

During the campaign, Fujimori was nicknamed El Chino, which roughly translates to "Chinaman"; it is common for people of any East Asian descent to be called chino in Peru, as elsewhere in Latin America, both derogatively and affectionately. Although he is of Japanese heritage, Fujimori has suggested that he was always gladdened by the term, which he perceived as a term of affection. With his election victory, he became the first person of East Asian descent to become head of government of a Latin American nation, and just the third of East Asian descent to govern a South American state, after Arthur Chung of Guyana and Henk Chin A Sen of Suriname (each of whom had served as head of state, rather than head of government).

== First term: 28 July 1990 – 28 July 1995 ==
=== Fujishock ===
During his first term in office, Fujimori enacted wide-ranging neoliberal reforms, known as Fujishock. During the presidency of Alan García, the economy had entered a period of hyperinflation and the political system was in crisis due to the country's internal conflict, leaving Peru in "economic and political chaos". Nonetheless, the Fujishock succeeded in restoring Peru to the global economy, though not without immediate social cost.

The immediate target of the first Fujimori Administration, was to stop the runaway course of inflation. Beyond that, the goals included repudiating protection and import substitution, returning to full participation in the world trading and financial systems, eliminating domestic price controls and subsidies, raising public revenue and holding government spending strictly to the levels of current revenue, initiating a social emergency program to reduce the shock of adjustment for the poor, and devoting a higher share of the country's resources to rural investment and correction of the causes of rural poverty. In practice, new measures came out in bits and pieces, dominated by immediate concern to stop inflation; actions taken in the first year did not complete the program. Reforms have permitted an economic growth since 1993, except for a slump after the 1997 Asian financial crisis.

Fujimori's initiative relaxed private sector price controls, drastically reduced government subsidies and government employment, eliminated all exchange controls, and also reduced restrictions on investment, imports, and capital flow. Tariffs were radically simplified, the minimum wage was immediately quadrupled, and the government established a $400 million poverty relief fund. The latter measure seemed to anticipate the economic agony that was to come, as electricity costs quintupled, water prices rose eightfold, and gasoline prices rose 3000%.

The IMF was impressed by these measures, and guaranteed loan funding for Peru. Inflation began to fall rapidly and foreign investment capital flooded in. Fujimori's privatization campaign featured the selling off of hundreds of state-owned enterprises, and the replacing of the country's troubled currency, the inti, with the Nuevo Sol. The Fujishock restored macroeconomic stability to the economy and triggered a considerable long-term economic upturn in the mid-1990s. In 1994, the Peruvian economy grew at a rate of 13%, faster than any other economy in the world.

A prime target for the privatization were a series of state-owned companies in the mineral industry. First in 1991 and 1992 the Peruvuan state sold off its shares in medium-scale mining. In the years that followed assetst belonging to the large-scale mining category were sold; in November 1992 Minpeco was sold and in 1993 and 1994 Cerro Verde and Tintaya as well as the processing plants Refinería de Zinc de Cajamarquilla and Refinería de Cobre de Ilo were sold. The sale plans for the large polymetallic mining company Centromin Peru failed as no investor showed interest.

=== 1992 Peruvian coup d'état ===
During Fujimori's first term in office, APRA and Vargas Llosa's party, FREDEMO, remained in control of both chambers of Congress (the Chamber of Deputies and Senate), hampering the government's ability to enact economic reforms. Fujimori also found it difficult to combat the threat posed by the Maoist guerrilla organization Shining Path (Spanish: Sendero Luminoso), due largely to what he perceived to be the intransigence and obstructionism of Congress. By March 1992, Congress met with the approval of only 17% of the electorate, according to one poll (the presidency stood at 42%, in the same poll).

In response to the political deadlock, on 5 April 1992, Fujimori with the support of the military carried out a presidential coup, also known as the autogolpe (auto-coup or self-coup) or Fujigolpe (Fuji-coup) in Peru. He shut down Congress, suspended the constitution, and purged the judiciary. The coup was welcomed by the public, according to numerous polls. Not only was the coup itself marked by favorable public opinion in several independent polls, but also public approval of the Fujimori administration jumped significantly in the wake of the coup. Fujimori often cited this public support in defending the coup, which he characterized as "not a negation of real democracy, but on the contrary… a search for an authentic transformation to assure a legitimate and effective democracy." Fujimori believed that Peruvian democracy had been nothing more than "a deceptive formality – a facade"; he claimed the coup was necessary to break with the deeply entrenched special interests that were hindering him from rescuing Peru from the chaotic state in which García had left it. Fujimori's coup was immediately met with the near-unanimous condemnation by the international community. The Organization of American States denounced the coup and demanded a return to "representative democracy", despite Fujimori's claims that his coup represented a "popular uprising". Various foreign ministers of OAS member states reiterated this condemnation of the autogolpe. They proposed an urgent effort to promote the re-establishment of "the democratic institutional order" in Peru. Following negotiations involving the OAS, the government, and opposition groups, Alberto Fujimori's initial response was to hold a referendum to ratify the auto-coup, which the OAS rejected. Fujimori then proposed scheduling elections for a Democratic Constituent Congress (CCD), which would be charged with drafting a new constitution, to be ratified by a national referendum. Despite the lack of consensus among political forces in Peru regarding this proposal, the ad hoc OAS meeting of ministers nevertheless approved Fujimori's offer in mid-May, and elections for the CCD were held on 22 November 1992.

Various states acted to condemn the coup individually. Venezuela broke off diplomatic relations, and Argentina withdrew its ambassador. Chile joined Argentina in requesting that Peru be suspended from the Organization of American States. International financiers delayed planned or projected loans, and the United States, Germany and Spain suspended all non-humanitarian aid to Peru. The coup appeared to threaten the economic recovery strategy of reinsertion, and complicated the process of clearing arrears with the International Monetary Fund.

Whereas Peruvian–U.S. relations early in Fujimori's presidency had been dominated by questions of coca eradication, Fujimori's autogolpe immediately became a major obstacle to international relations, as the United States immediately suspended all military and economic aid to Peru, with exceptions for counter-narcotic and humanitarian-related funds.

=== Post-coup period ===
With FREDEMO dissolved and APRA's leader, Alan García, exiled to Colombia, Fujimori sought to legitimize his position. He called elections for a Democratic Constitutional Congress that would serve as a legislature and a constituent assembly. While APRA and Popular Action attempted to boycott this, the Popular Christian Party (PPC, not to be confused with PCP Partido Comunista del Peru) and many left-leaning parties participated in this election. His supporters won a majority in this body, and drafted a new constitution in 1993. A referendum was scheduled, and the coup and the Constitution of 1993 were approved by a narrow margin of between four and five percent.

Later in the year, on 13 November, there was a failed military coup, led by General Jaime Salinas Sedó. Salinas asserted that his efforts were a matter of turning Fujimori over for trial, for violating the Peruvian constitution.

In 1994, Fujimori separated from his wife Susana Higuchi in a noisy, public divorce. He formally stripped her of the title First Lady in August 1994, appointing their elder daughter First Lady in her stead. Higuchi publicly denounced Fujimori as a "tyrant" and claimed that his administration was corrupt. They formally divorced in 1995.

== Second term: 28 July 1995 – 28 July 2000 ==
The 1993 Constitution allowed Fujimori to run for a second term, and in April 1995, at the height of his popularity, Fujimori easily won reelection with almost two-thirds of the vote. His major opponent, former Secretary-General of the United Nations Javier Pérez de Cuéllar, won only 22 percent of the vote. Fujimori's supporters won comfortable majorities in the legislature. One of the first acts of the new congress was to declare an amnesty for all members of the Peruvian military or police accused or convicted of human rights abuses between 1980 and 1995.

During his second term, Fujimori signed a peace agreement with Ecuador over a border dispute that had simmered for more than a century. The treaty allowed the two countries to obtain international funds for developing the border region. Fujimori also settled some unresolved issues with Chile, Peru's southern neighbor, outstanding since the Treaty of Lima of 1929.

The 1995 election was the turning point in Fujimori's career. Peruvians now began to be more concerned about freedom of speech and the press. However, before he was sworn in for a second term, Fujimori stripped two universities of their autonomy and reshuffled the national electoral board. This led his opponents to call him "Chinochet," a reference to his previous nickname and to Chilean ruler Augusto Pinochet.

According to a poll by the Peruvian Research and Marketing Company conducted in 1997, 40.6% of Lima residents considered President Fujimori an authoritarian.

High growth during Fujimori's first term petered out during his second term. "El Niño" phenomena had a tremendous impact on the Peruvian economy during the late 1990s. Nevertheless, total GDP growth between 1992 and 2001, inclusive, was 44.60%, that is, 3.76% per annum; total GDP per capita growth between 1991 and 2001, inclusive, was 30.78%, that is, 2.47% per annum. Also, studies by INEI, the national statistics bureau show that the number of Peruvians living in poverty increased dramatically (from 41.6% to more than 70%) during Alan García's term, but they actually decreased (from more than 70% to 54%) during Fujimori's term. Furthermore, FAO reported Peru reduced undernourishment by about 29% from 1990 to 1992 to 1997–99.

Peru was reintegrated into the global economic system, and began to attract foreign investment. The sell-off of state-owned enterprises led to improvements in some service industries, notably local telephony, mobile telephony and Internet. For example, before privatization, a consumer or business would need to wait up to 10 years to get a local telephone line installed from the monopolistic state-run telephone company, at a cost of $607 for a residential line. A couple of years after privatization, the wait was reduced to just a few days. Peru's Physical land based telephone network had a dramatic increase in telephone penetration from 2.9% in 1993 to 5.9% in 1996 and 6.2% in 2000, and a dramatic decrease in the wait for a telephone line. Average wait went from 70 months in 1993 (before privatization) to two months in 1996 (after privatization). Privatization also generated foreign investment in export-oriented activities such as mining and energy extraction, notably the Camisea gas project and the copper and zinc extraction projects at Antamina.

By the end of the decade, Peru's international currency reserves were built up from nearly zero at the end of García's term to almost US$10 billion. Economic improvement led to the revival of tourism, agroexport, industries and fisheries.

In addition to the nature of democracy under Fujimori, Peruvians were becoming increasingly interested in the myriad criminal allegations involving Fujimori and his chief of the National Intelligence Service, Vladimiro Montesinos. A 2002 report by Health Minister Fernando Carbone would later suggest that Fujimori was involved in the forced sterilizations of up to 300,000 indigenous women from 1996 to 2000, as part of a population control program. A 2004 World Bank publication would suggest that, in this period, Montesinos' abuse of the power accorded him by Fujimori "led to a steady and systematic undermining of the rule of law".

== Third term: 28 July – 17 November 2000 ==
The 1993 constitution limits a presidency to two terms. Shortly after Fujimori began his second term, his supporters in Congress passed a law of "authentic interpretation" which effectively allowed him to run for another term in 2000. A 1998 effort to repeal this law by referendum failed. In late 1999, Fujimori announced that he would run for a third term. Peruvian electoral bodies, which were politically sympathetic to Fujimori, accepted his argument that the two-term restriction did not apply to him, as it was enacted while he was already in office.

Exit polls showed Fujimori fell short of the 50% required to avoid an electoral runoff, but the first official results showed him with 49.6% of the vote, just short of outright victory. Eventually, Fujimori was credited with 49.89%—20,000 votes short of avoiding a runoff. Despite reports of numerous irregularities, the international observers recognized an adjusted victory of Fujimori. His primary opponent, Alejandro Toledo, called for his supporters to spoil their ballots in the runoff by writing "No to fraud!" on them (voting is mandatory in Peru). International observers pulled out of the country after Fujimori refused to delay the runoff.

In the runoff, Fujimori won with 51.1% of the valid votes. While votes for Toledo declined from 40.24% of the valid votes cast in the first round to 25.67% of the valid votes in the second round, invalid votes jumped from 2.25% of the total votes cast in the first round to 29.93% of total votes in the second round. The large percentage of votes cast as invalid suggested that many Peruvians took Toledo's advice to spoil their ballots.

(The 51.1 and 25 figures are as percentages of valid votes, that is, excluding invalid votes. Thus, there were 29.93% invalid votes and 70.07% valid votes. Of this 70.07%, 51.1% were for Fujimori and 25.67% for Toledo.)

Although Fujimori had won the runoff with only a bare majority, rumors of irregularities led most of the international community to shun his third swearing-in on 28 July. For the next seven weeks, there were daily demonstrations in front of the presidential palace.

As a conciliatory measure, Fujimori appointed former opposition candidate Federico Salas as the new prime minister. However, opposition parties in Parliament refused to support this move while Toledo campaigned vigorously to have the election annulled. At this point, a corruption scandal involving Vladimiro Montesinos broke out, and exploded into full force on the evening of 14 September 2000, when the cable television station Canal N broadcast footage of Montesinos apparently bribing opposition congressman Alberto Kouri for his defection to Fujimori's Perú 2000 party. This video was presented by Fernando Olivera, leader of the FIM (Independent Moralizing Front), who purchased it from one of Montesinos's closest allies (nicknamed by the Peruvian press El Patriota).

Fujimori's support virtually collapsed, and a few days later he announced in a nationwide address that he would shut down the SIN and call new elections—in which he would not be a candidate. On 10 November, Fujimori won approval from Congress to hold elections on 8 April 2001. On 13 November, Fujimori left Peru for a visit to Brunei to attend the Asia-Pacific Economic Cooperation forum. On 16 November, Valentín Paniagua took over as president of Congress after the pro-Fujimori leadership lost a vote of confidence. On 17 November, Fujimori traveled from Brunei to Tokyo, where he submitted his presidential resignation via fax. The Peruvian Congress refused to accept his resignation, voting instead 62 yea –9 nay to remove Fujimori from the office of the president of Peru on the grounds that he was "permanently morally disabled."

On November 19, Fujimori's government ministers presented their resignations en masse. Because Fujimori's first vice president, Francisco Tudela, had resigned a few days earlier, his successor Ricardo Márquez was called the new president. Congress, however, refused to recognize him, as he was an ardent Fujimori loyalist; Márquez resigned two days later. Paniagua was voted by the Peruvian Congress as the next in line, and became interim president to oversee the April elections.

== Reception ==
=== Criticism ===
Detractors have observed that Fujimori was able to encourage large-scale mining projects with foreign corporations and push through mining-friendly legislation laws because the post auto-coup political picture greatly facilitated the process.

Some analysts state that some of the GDP growth during the Fujimori years reflects a greater rate of extraction of non-renewable resources by transnational companies; these companies were attracted by Fujimori by means of near-zero royalties, and, by the same fact, little of the extracted wealth has stayed in the country. Peru's mining legislation, they claim, has served as a role model for other countries that wish to become more mining-friendly.

Fujimori's privatization program also remains shrouded in controversy. A congressional investigation in 2002, led by socialist opposition congressman Javier Diez Canseco, stated that of the US$9 billion raised through the privatizations of hundreds of state-owned enterprises, only a small fraction of this income ever benefited the Peruvian people.

The one instance of organised labour's success in impeding reforms, namely the teachers' union resistance to education reform, was based on traditional methods of organisation and resistance: strikes and street demonstrations.

Some scholars claim that Fujimori's government became a "dictatorship" after the auto-coup, permeated by a network of corruption organized by his associate Montesinos, who now faces dozens of charges that range from embezzlement to drug trafficking to murder (Montesinos is currently on trial in Lima). Fujimori's style of government has also been described as "populist authoritarianism". Numerous governments and human rights organizations such as Amnesty International, have welcomed the extradition of Fujimori to face human rights charges. As early as 1991, Fujimori had himself vocally denounced what he called "pseudo-human rights organizations" such as Amnesty International and Americas Watch, for allegedly failing to criticize the insurgencies targeting civilian populations throughout Peru against which his government was struggling.

In the 2004 Global Transparency Report, Fujimori made into the list of the World's Most Corrupt Leaders. He was listed seventh and he was said to have amassed $600 million.

=== Popular support ===
Fujimori still enjoys a measure of support within Peru. A poll conducted in March 2005 by the Instituto de Desarrollo e Investigación de Ciencias Económicas (IDICE) indicated that 12.1% of the respondents intended to vote for Fujimori in the 2006 presidential election. A poll conducted on 25 November 2005, by the Universidad de Lima indicated a high approval (45.6%) rating of the Fujimori period between 1990 and 2000, attributed to his counterinsurgency efforts (53%).

According to a more recent Universidad de Lima survey, Fujimori still retains public support, ranking fifth in personal popularity among other political figures. Popular approval for his decade-long presidency (1990–2000) has reportedly grown (from 31.5% in 2002 to 49.5% in May 2007). Despite accusations of corruption and human rights violations, nearly half of the individuals interviewed in the survey approved of Fujimori's presidential regime. In a 2007 Universidad de Lima survey of 600 Peruvians in Lima and the port of Callao, 82.6% agreed that the former president should be extradited from Chile to stand trial in Peru. During his campaign, Alejandro Toledo promised Peruvians higher wages, a fight against poverty, anti-corruption measures, higher pensions, more employment, military reform, development of tourism, and industrialization. As Peru's top economist Pedro Pablo Kuczynski noted “Toledo comes after almost 30 years of either dictatorships or governments that weren't so democratic. People expect Toledo to solve all the problems of the last 30 years, which included an enormous increase in relative poverty." Toledo's inability to fulfill many of these promises created widespread dissatisfaction. His approval ratings were consistently low throughout his presidency, sometimes sinking into single digits.

== See also ==
- Neoliberalism in Peru
