= Mawk'allaqta, Espinar =

Archaeological site in Peru

Mawk'allaqta
- Interactive map of Mawk'allaqta
- 14°55′30″S 71°33′58″W
- Location: Peru, Cusco Region, Espinar Province
- Region: Andes

Mawk'allaqta, also Mawk'a Llaqta (Quechua mawk'a ancient, llaqta place (village, town, city, country, nation), "ancient place", hispanicized spellings Maukallacta, Maukallaqta, Mauk'allaqta) is an archaeological site in Peru. It is located in the Cusco Region, Espinar Province, on the border of the districts Coporaque and Suykutambo. Mawk'allaqta is situated on the banks of the Hank'amayu and the Apurímac River at a height of 3,915 metres (12,844 ft).

== See also ==
- Taqrachullu
