= Atawallpa Much'u =

Mountain in Peru

- Location within Peru

Highest point
- Elevation: 5,000 m (16,000 ft)
- Coordinates: 15°12′13″S 71°03′31″W

Naming
- Language of name: Aymara

Geography
- Location: Peru, Cusco Region
- Parent range: Andes

Atawallpa Much'u (Aymara atawallpa hen, much'u little child, "hen's little child", Hispanicized spelling Atahualpa Mocho) is a mountain in the Andes of Peru, about 5,000 m (16,000 ft) high. It is located in the Cusco Region, Espinar Province, on the border of the districts of Condoroma and Ocoruro. Atawallpa Much'u lies northwest of Atawallpa.
