= Taqrachullu =

Archaeological site in Peru

- Interactive map of Taqrachullu
- 14°58′05″S 71°36′23″W
- Location: Peru, Cusco Region, Espinar Province
- Region: Andes

Site notes
- Height: 3,800 m (12,500 ft)

Cultural Heritage of Peru
- Type: Immovable tangible

Taqrachullu, Pukara Taqrachullu, T'akrachullu, Pukara T'akrachullu (Quechua t'akra uncultivated land, an infertile or rocky piece of land, chullu spur of land which ends in the confluence of two rivers / something soaked) or María Fortaleza is an archaeological site in Peru. It is located in the Cusco Region, Espinar Province, Suykutambo District.

The site was declared a National Cultural Heritage (Patrimonio Cultural) of Peru.

== See also ==
- Mawk'allaqta
