= Yauri, Peru =

Yauri Espinar
- Town
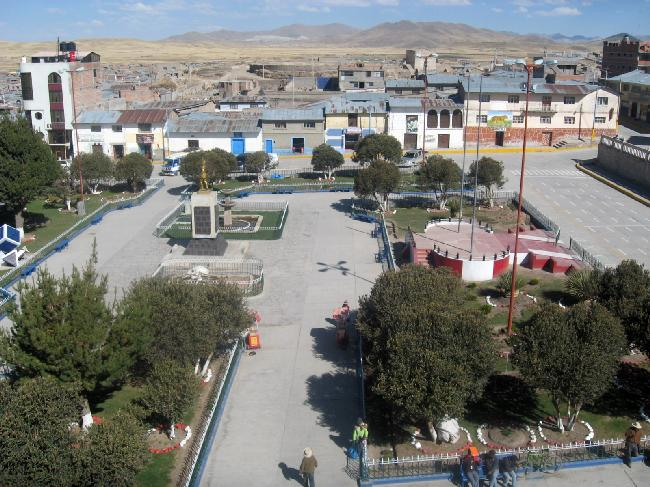

- Location within Peru
- Coordinates: 14.793056°S 71.413333°W
- Country: Peru
- Region: Cusco
- Province: Espinar
- District: Espinar
- Elevation: 3,976 m (13,045 ft)
- Time zone: UTC-5 (PET)

Yauri, or Espinar, is a town in southern Peru, the capital of Espinar Province in the Cusco Region. It is a city located at an elevation of 3,976 metres above sea level,; its district had a population of 41,587 in the 2025 national census. Average temperatures in the province range between 7.2 and 8.6 °C, and snowfall in the town is occasional.

Nearby is the archaeological site Taqrachullo (also known as “María Fortaleza”), which dates to pre-Inca and Inca periods and has been designated as part of the Cultural Heritage of the Nation. The town serves as an access point to the surrounding areas of the Cusco Department, offering a base for exploring the region’s history and culture.
