= Espinar province =

Coordinates: 14.792145°S 71.410447°W

Espinar
- Province
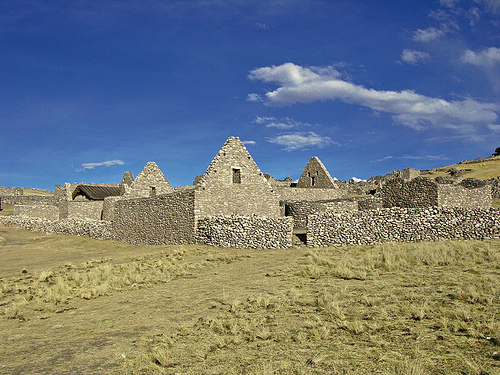
- K'anamarka in the Espinar Province

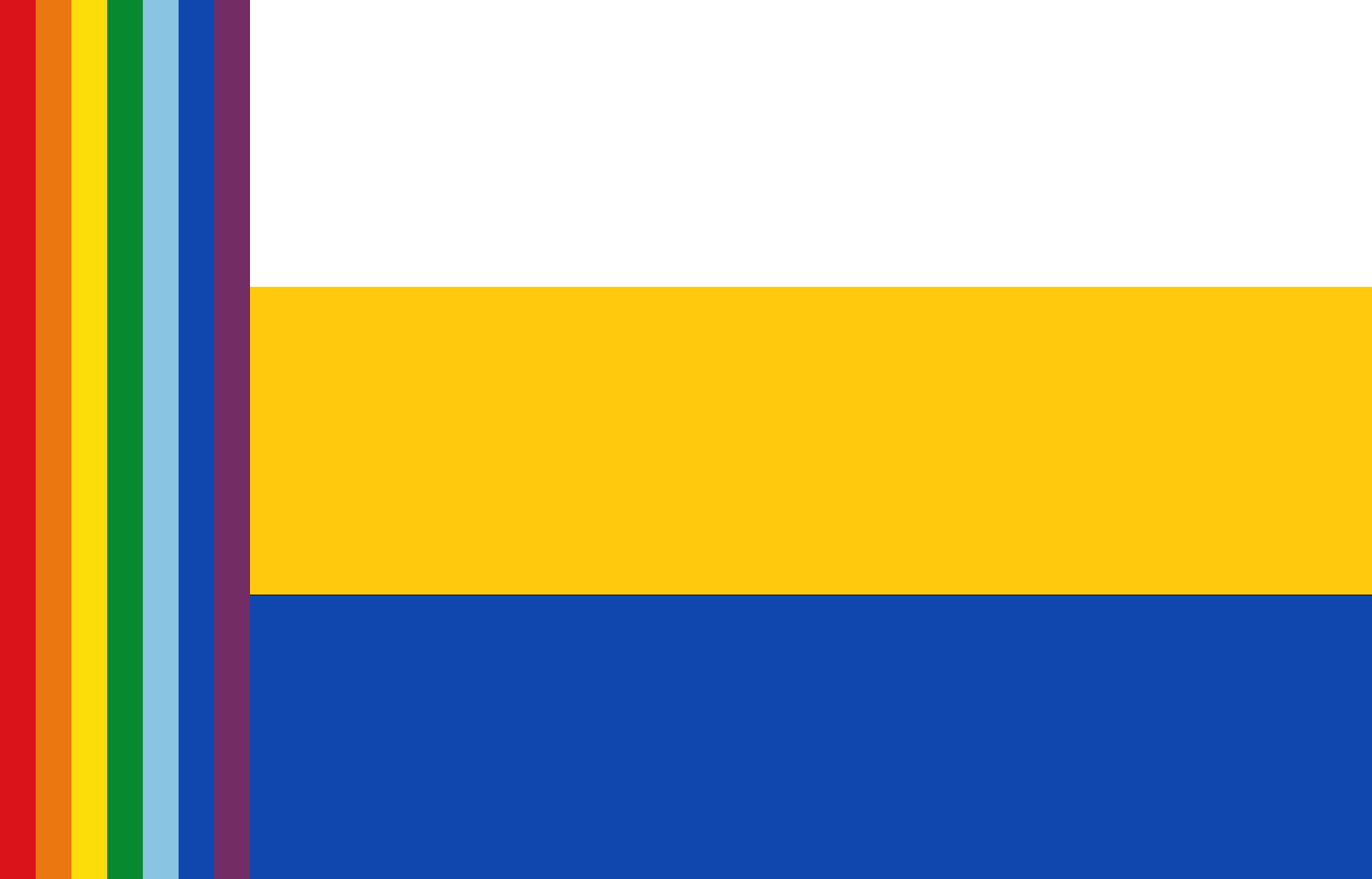
- Flag

- Location of Espinar in the Cusco Region
- Country: Peru
- Region: Cusco
- Capital: Yauri

Government
  - Mayor: Lindley Alfredo Salinas Perez (2007)

Area
  - Total: 5,311.09 km^{2} (2,050.62 sq mi)

Population (2005 census)
  - Total: 66,908
  - Density: 12.598/km^{2} (32.628/sq mi)
- UBIGEO: 0808

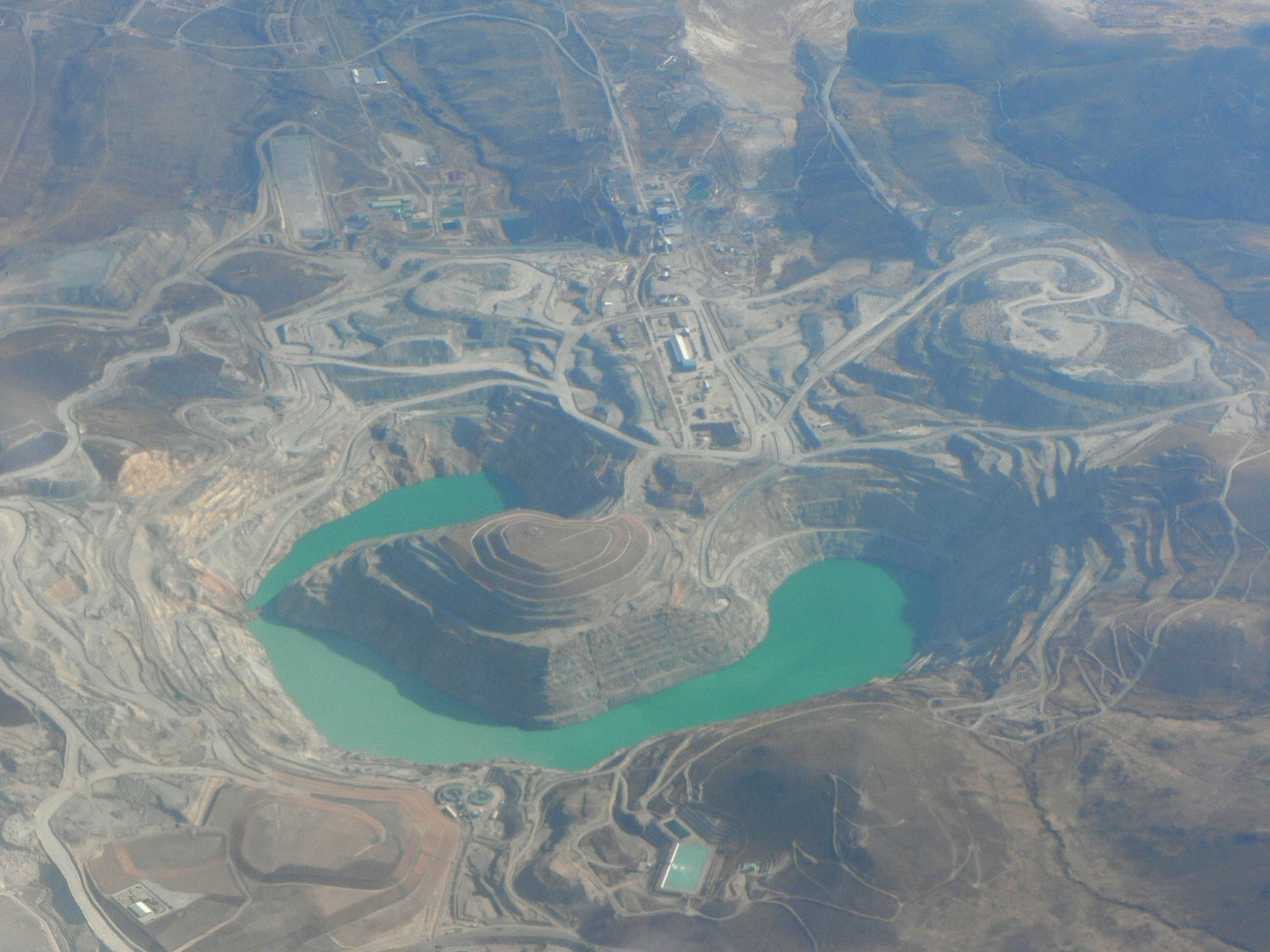
Tintaya copper mine as seen from the air.

Espinar is one of thirteen provinces in the Cusco Region in the southern highlands of Peru.

== Geography ==
Some of the highest mountains of the province are listed below:

- Allqamarini
- Akillani
- Anta Anta
- Anta Qullu
- Apachita
- Aqhu Phichaqa
- Atawallpa
- Atawallpa Much'u
- Chunkara Qaqa
- Chuqi Pirwa (Are.-Cusco)
- Chuqi Pirwa (Cusco-Puno)
- Ch'iyar Jaqhi
- Ch'iyara
- Ch'uwañuma
- Hatun Chhuka
- Huch'uy Mut'u
- Isankani
- Janq'u
- Janq'u Q'awa
- Japu Apachita
- Jichu Qullu
- Kimsa Chata
- Kiswarani Q'asa
- Kuntur Sayana
- Kuntur Uma
- Kunturi
- Laramani
- Machu Kunturuma
- Misa Urqu
- Mut'u
- Muyu Qaqa
- Pawsa Urqu
- Pilluni
- Puka Nasa
- Puka Puka
- Puka Punchu
- Puka Q'asa
- Pukara
- Pumanuta
- Qaqa Urqu
- Qullpa Pata
- Qullqi Q'awa
- Q'ara Qullu
- Q'atawini
- Salla
- Salla Saywa
- Siq'i Urqu
- Sura Quta
- Sura Urqu
- Sura Uma
- Tarujani
- Taypi Tira
- Urqu K'uchu
- Uturunku Pata
- Wallqa
- Waman Wachana
- Wanu Wanu
- Waylla Apachita
- Waylla Tira
- Waylluma
- Wayna Sinqa
- Wila Wila
- Wiska Apachita
- Yana Qaqa
- Yana Urqu
- Yuraq Q'asa
- Yuraq Sunquyuq

== Political division ==
The province is divided into eight districts (Spanish: distritos, singular: distrito), each of which is headed by a mayor (alcalde). The districts, with their capitals in parentheses, are:

- Alto Pichigua (Accocunca)
- Condoroma (Condoroma)
- Coporaque (Coporaque)
- Espinar (Yauri)
- Ocoruro (Ocoruro)
- Pallpata (Hector Tejada)
- Pichigua (Pichigua)
- Suykutambo (Suykutambo)

== History ==
On 21 May 2012, agricultural leadership in Espinar Province announced a strike against the planned expansion of Tintaya mine, a copper mine owned by the Swiss corporation Xstrata. The leaders' demands included higher environmental standards, more money for area development, and independent oversight of the mine. Strikers occupied the roads to the mine over the following week, blocking all access. In response, President Ollanta Humala declared a state of emergency in the province, suspending constitutional rights, and deployed police commandos against the strikers. Two civilians were killed in the resulting clashes, and seventy police officers were injured. On 30 May, provincial mayor Oscar Mollohuanca was arrested by the national government and accused of inciting protests against an expansion of a copper mine owned by Xstrata. He was conditionally released on 13 July.

== Ethnic groups ==
The people in the province are mainly indigenous citizens of Quechua descent. Quechua is the language which the majority of the population (68.90%) learnt to speak in childhood, 30.75% of the residents started speaking in Spanish (2007 Peru Census).

== See also ==
- K'anamarka
- Mawk'allaqta
- Mullu Q'awa
- Qillqa
- Taqrachullu
