= Tintaya mine =

Copper mine in Peru

Coordinates: 14°53′16″S 71°19′13″W

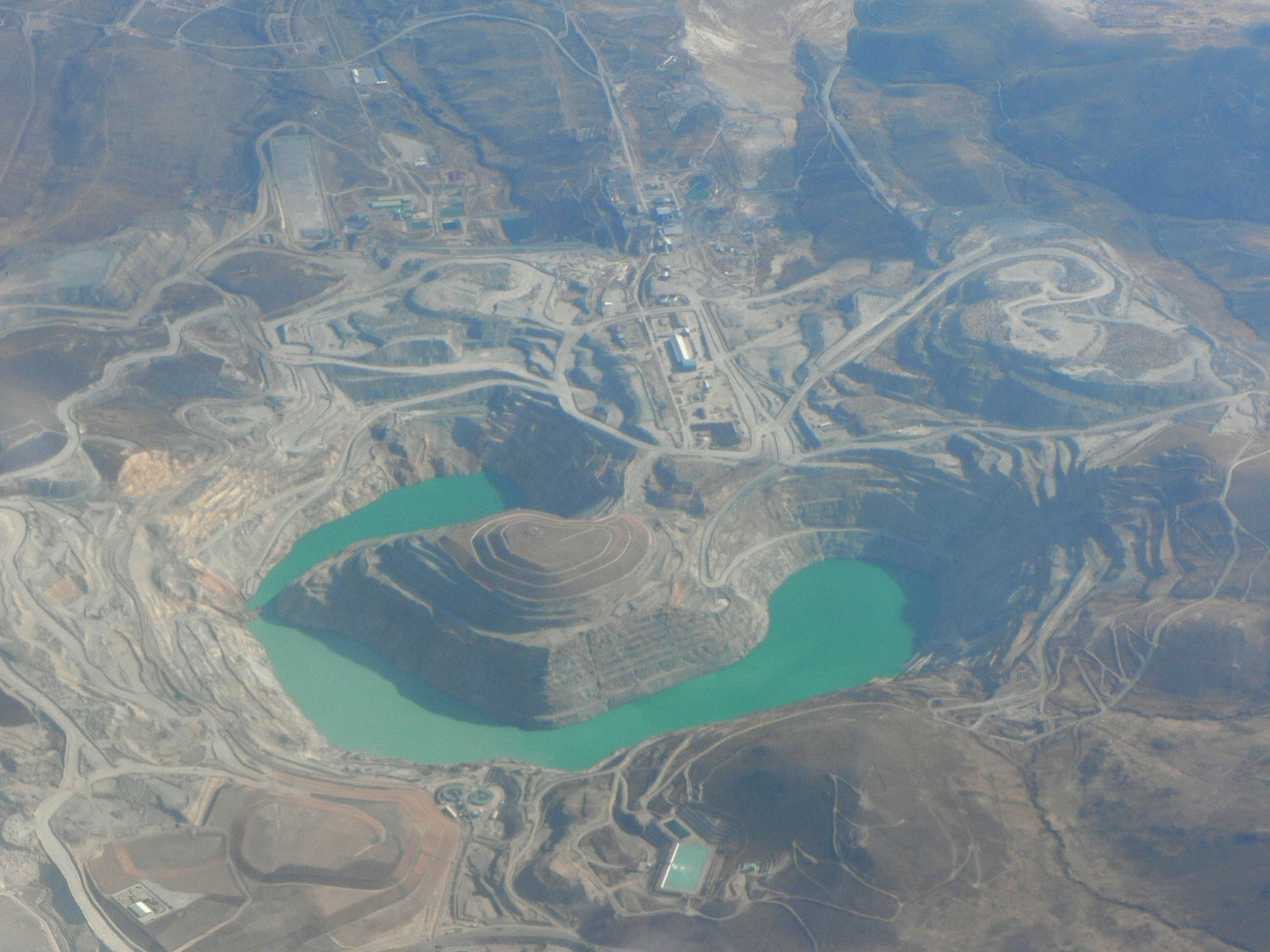
Tintaya copper mine as seen from the air

Tintaya (Quechua for the cocoon which contains the chrysalis of the moth) is a Peruvian copper mine. It was owned by the Swiss corporation Xstrata (now merged with Glencore). The mine is located in the Cusco Region, Espinar Province, Yauri District, southeast of Yauri. The ore processing rate is at 5,404,000 tons per year and the construction phase of the mine asked for US$368 millions investment. SNC, of Montreal, Canada, was hired for feasibility and EPCM for the mine.

== See also ==
- Canadian mining in Latin America and the Caribbean
- Mining in Peru
- List of mines in Peru
