= Yauri District =

Coordinates: 14.7925°S 71.4131°W

Yauri Kiskachay
- District
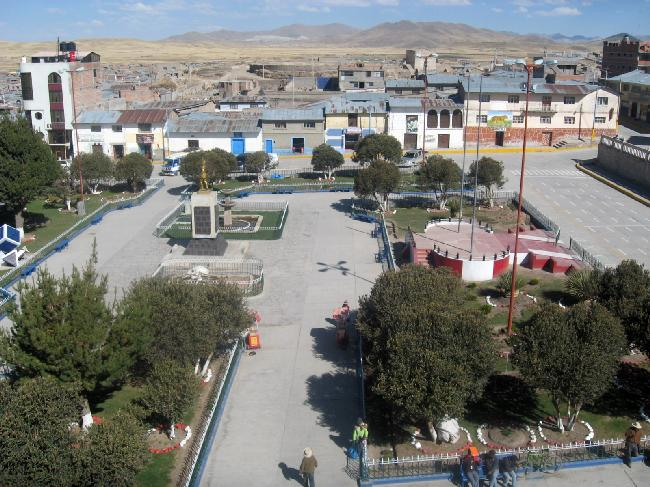
- Interactive map of Yauri
- Country: Peru
- Region: Cusco
- Province: Espinar
- Capital: Yauri

Government
  - Mayor: Lindley Alfredo Salinas Perez

Area
  - Total: 747.78 km^{2} (288.72 sq mi)
- Elevation: 3,915 m (12,844 ft)

Population (2005 census)
  - Total: 32,471
  - Density: 43.423/km^{2} (112.47/sq mi)
- Time zone: UTC-5 (PET)
- UBIGEO: 080801

Yauri District, also known as Espinar or Kiskachay District, is one of eight districts of the Espinar Province in Peru. Its seat is Yauri (Yawri).

== Geography ==
One of the highest peaks of the district is Chuqi Pirwa at approximately 4,800 m (15,700 ft). Other mountains are listed below:

- Chuku Chuku
- Chuwa Chuwa
- Ch'iyar Jaqhi
- Hatun Quymi
- Huch'uy Quymi
- Janq'u
- Kimsa Chata
- Kiska Qhata
- Llallawa
- Pallana
- Pawkara
- Puka Nasa
- Qaqa Punku
- Q'illu Q'illu
- Thutayuq
- Urquyuq
- Wila Wila
- Wiska Apachita
- Yuraq Sunquyuq

== Climate ==
Climate data for Yauri, elevation 3,920 m (12,860 ft), (1991–2020)
Month	Jan	Feb	Mar	Apr	May	Jun	Jul	Aug	Sep	Oct	Nov	Dec	Year
Mean daily maximum °C (°F)	16.8 (62.2)	16.5 (61.7)	16.6 (61.9)	16.5 (61.7)	16.4 (61.5)	16.0 (60.8)	15.9 (60.6)	17.0 (62.6)	18.3 (64.9)	18.9 (66.0)	19.5 (67.1)	18.2 (64.8)	17.2 (63.0)
Mean daily minimum °C (°F)	3.5 (38.3)	3.7 (38.7)	3.2 (37.8)	0.9 (33.6)	−4.7 (23.5)	−8.6 (16.5)	−8.8 (16.2)	−6.9 (19.6)	−3.5 (25.7)	−0.8 (30.6)	0.2 (32.4)	2.1 (35.8)	−1.6 (29.1)
Average precipitation mm (inches)	177.4 (6.98)	178.8 (7.04)	134.9 (5.31)	61.5 (2.42)	8.4 (0.33)	1.9 (0.07)	2.8 (0.11)	9.1 (0.36)	15.5 (0.61)	45.6 (1.80)	57.1 (2.25)	128.0 (5.04)	821 (32.32)
Source: National Meteorology and Hydrology Service of Peru

== See also ==
- K'anamarka
