= Yuraq Q'asa (Espinar) =

Mountain in Peru

- Location within Peru

Highest point
- Elevation: 4,800 m (15,700 ft)
- Coordinates: 15°14′59″S 71°00′48″W

Naming
- Language of name: Quechua

Geography
- Location: Peru, Cusco Region, Espinar Province
- Parent range: Andes

Yuraq Q'asa (Quechua yuraq white, q'asa mountain pass, "white mountain pass", Hispanicized spelling Yuraccasa) is a mountain in the Andes of Peru, about 4,800 m (15,700 ft) high. It is located in the Cusco Region, Espinar Province, Condoroma District.
