= Kanamarka =

Archaeological site in Peru

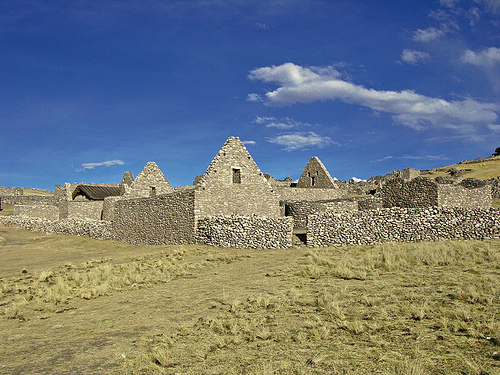
- The ruins of Kanamarka
- Interactive map of Kanamarka
- 14°45′45″S 71°20′00″W
- Location: Peru, Cusco Region, Espinar Province

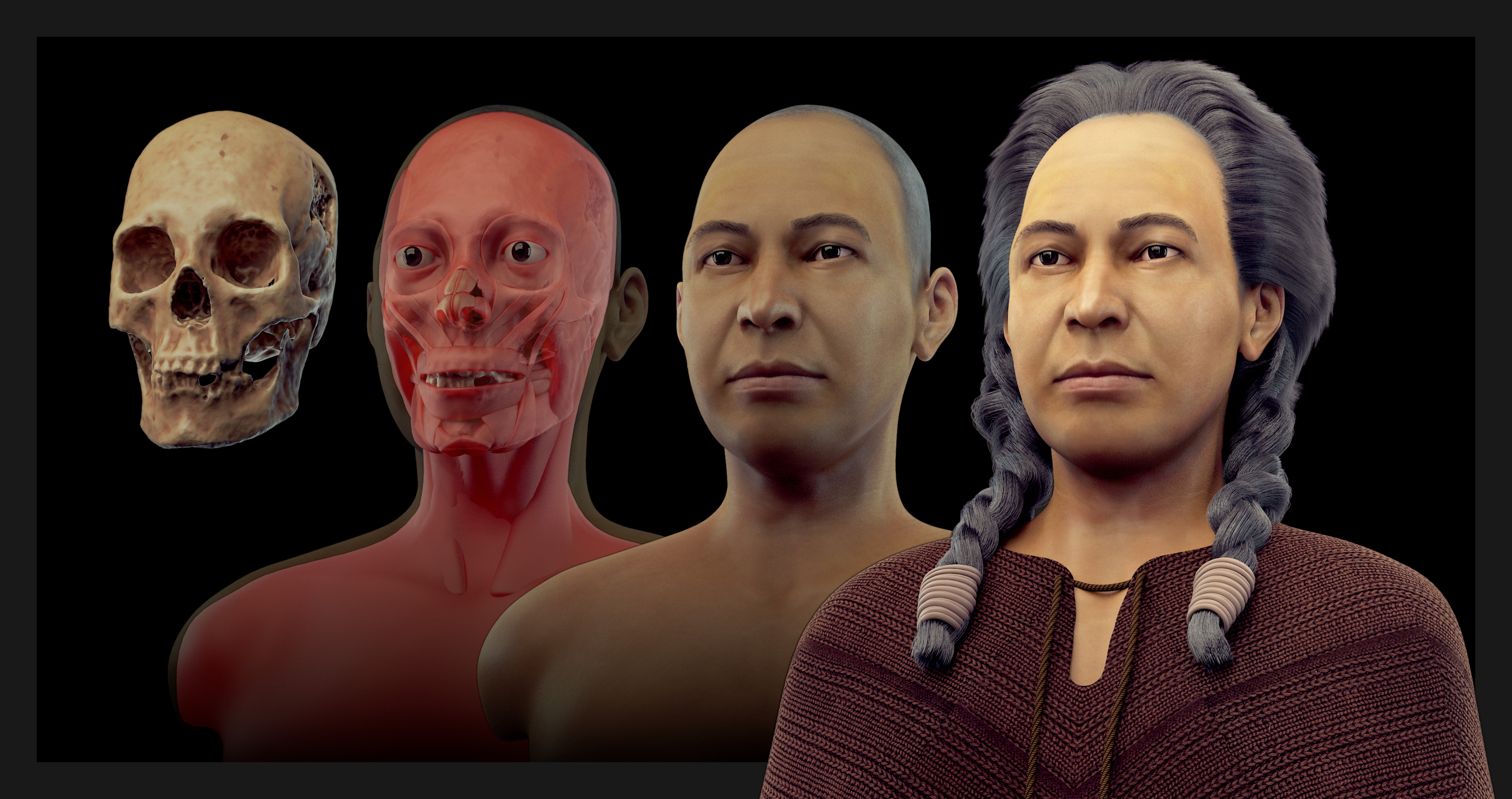
The forensic facial reconstruccion of the Lady of K'anamarka - steps

Kanamarka or Kanamarca (possibly from Quechua k'ana glowing, K'ana a Peruvian people, marka village) is an archaeological site in Peru. It is located in the Cusco Region, Espinar Province, Alto Pichigua District.

== See also ==
- List of archaeological sites in Peru
