= Aqhu Phichaqa =

Mountain in Peru

- Location within Peru

Highest point
- Elevation: 4,800 m (15,700 ft)
- Coordinates: 15°12′39″S 71°06′54″W

Naming
- Language of name: Aymara, Quechua

Geography
- Location: Peru, Cusco Region
- Parent range: Andes

Aqhu Phichaqa (Aymara aqhu tooth, phichaqa big needle, Hispanicized spelling Ajopichaca) is a mountain in the Andes of Peru, about 4,800 m (15,700 ft) high. It is located in the Cusco Region, Espinar Province, on the border of the districts of Condoroma and Ocoruro. Aqhu Phichaqa lies between Yana Urqu in the northeast and Janq'u Q'awa in the southwest.
