= Atawallpa (Cusco) =

Mountain in Peru

- Location within Peru

Highest point
- Elevation: 5,000 m (16,000 ft)
- Coordinates: 15°12′46″S 71°02′45″W

Naming
- Language of name: Aymara

Geography
- Location: Peru, Cusco Region
- Parent range: Andes

Atawallpa (Aymara for hen, Hispanicized spelling Atahualpa) is a mountain in the Andes of Peru, about 5,000 m (16,000 ft) high. It is located in the Cusco Region, Espinar Province, on the border of the districts of Condoroma and Ocoruro. The mountain northwest of it is Atawallpa Much'u ("hen's little child"). Atawallpa lies at a lake named Wallatani ("the one with the Andean goose", Hispanicized Guallatane).
