= Yanaca =

Archaeological site in Peru

Coordinates: 14°13′04″S 73°08′28″W

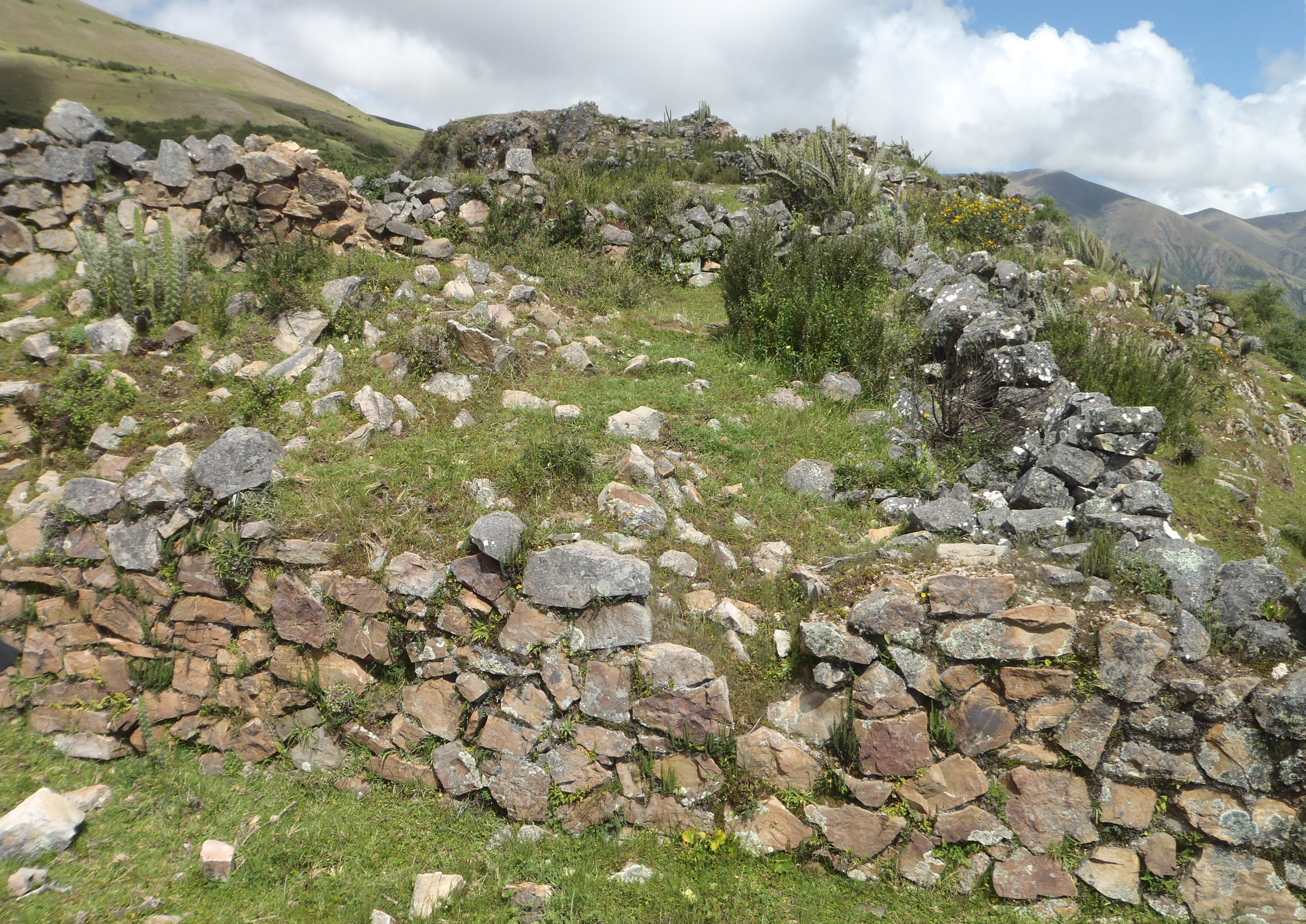
- Ruins of a house in Tunay Q'asa village
- Interactive map of Yanaca
- Type: Settlement
- Location: Yanaca District, Aymaraes Province, Apurimac Region, Peru
- Region: Andes

Yanaca is a group of ancient, pre-Incan towns located in Peru in Apurimac Region, Aymaraes Province, Yanaca District. These towns were located in the area surrounding the present-day town of Yanaca in the Andes mountain range, between the Quechua and Suni regions.

== History ==
=== Pre-Incan Era ===
It is extremely difficult to know when the first inhabitants arrived in Yanaca. Increasing the number of archeological expeditions could help to obtain more information about the origin of the ancient Yana peoples. Through archeological studies carried out at other sites, it was concluded that the first settlers probably arrived from Asia around 2,000 BCE, settling in the area of Pacaicasa (Ayacucho), according to José Rios Velazquez.

Before the Incan civilization had settled the area, there were various peoples that populated the region, like the Quechuas, Pocras, Aucarunas, and Aymaras. According to archaeologist Max Uhle, in Vilcashuamán, in the country of the Chancas, they spoke the Aymara language before the Incan invasion. Various authors have also mentioned the presence of the Yanas in the region.

=== Incan Conquests ===
According to the writings of Felipe Guaman Poma de Ayala from 1350–1400, these Yana tribes voluntarily subjected themselves to the colonizing forces of the Incan Mayta Capac and, later on, his brother Aunque Tito Capac Yupanqui and the Chocce Incas. They traveled through a place called Yawarrco along the Atun Paqcha road, which still exists today.

During the absolute rule of the Inca, it seemed, according to some authors, that the Yanas had submitted to the Incas, although the term "slavery" is not used. Many authors have tried to study the Yanas' culture during the Incan era, but many questions remain unanswered. For example, authors like Garcilaso describe the Yana as the Incas' servants. Others say that the Yanas simply helped the Inca.

Miguel Cabello de Balboa, on the other hand, says that almost 6,000 of the Yana were executed by the Inca. Pedros José Rios Velazques supposes that this last version could be the closest to the truth given that, during the reign of Pachacutec, the rebels moved away towards the Andean towns that were farther from Cuzco, the capital.

According to Murra (1983) and Garcilaso (1960), the Yanas could have benefited from their minority status within the Incan social hierarchy, taking on jobs at the noble court like carpentry, cooking, water carrier, sweeper, etc.

R. Tom Zuidema also confirms this theory. His investigation led to the discovery that Yanaca was a city that had an important role in Incan social, political, and religious organization.

The political division of Incan territory is better known today. Various sources have shown that the province of Aymaraes was divided into four sub-provinces. Yanaca was one of these sub-provinces.

=== Spanish Conquest ===
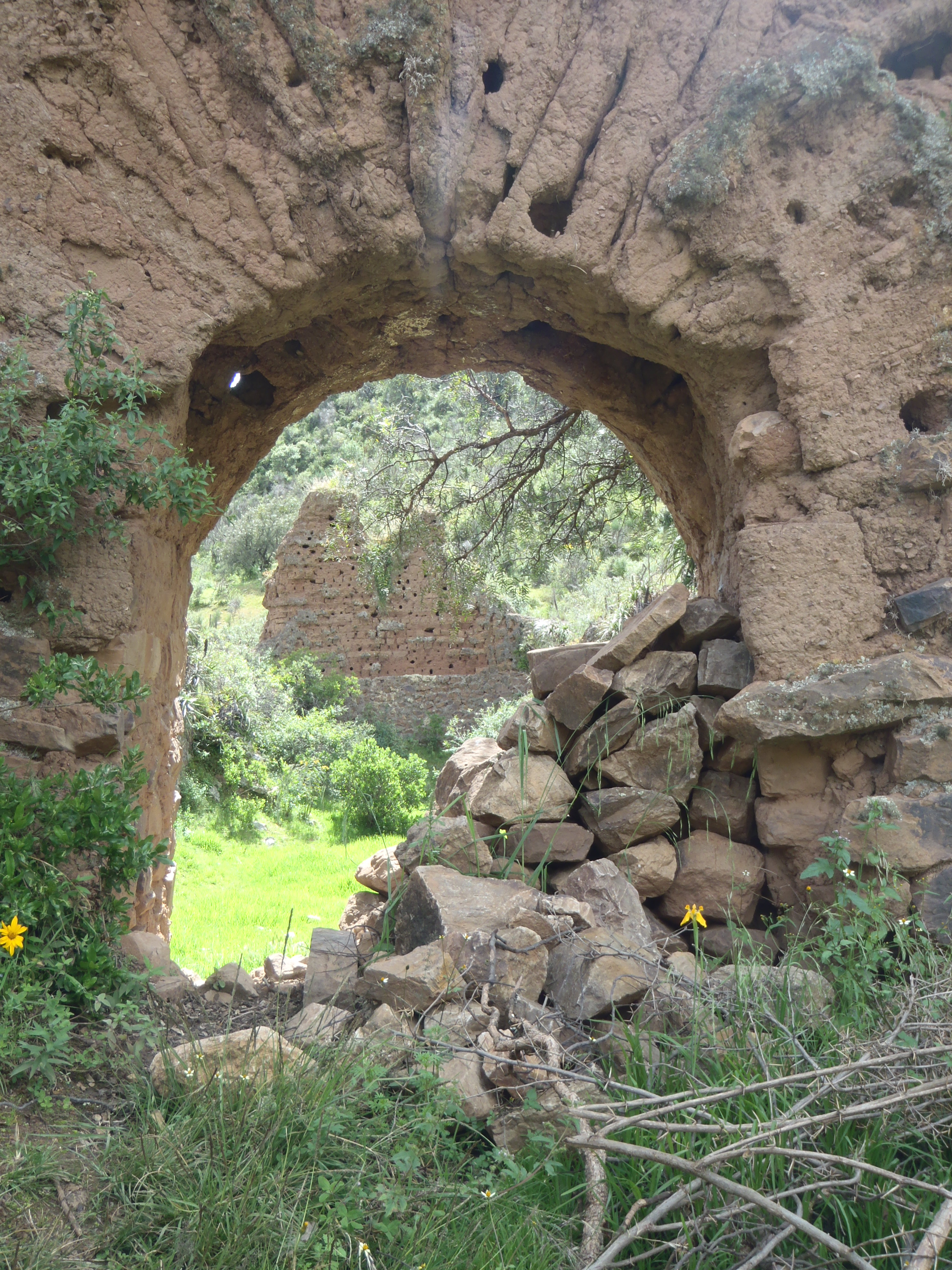
Parancay Church: the first church constructed by the Spanish in the 16th century. Located near the town of Chacha-Callas, this church is made of stone and adobe.

In 1840, after the defeat of the Inca, Francisco Pizzaro ordered the Repartimiento of the indigenous people from the entire Incan Empire. Yanaca was colonized by the Spanish a few years later.

It is believed that the Spanish first settled in the town of Parangay, next to Yanaca. Today, one can still see ruins of the first church that was constructed there. This church was built from stone and adobe. It is located between the town of Parangay and the ruins of Chacha-calla, another pre-Incan city belonging to the Yanaca district.

The information that we have from this era indicates that there was an important level of population density in the Yanaca valley at this time. A census carried out in 1572 registered 30,000 people.

In 1720, Don Juan de Beytia, a magistrate sent by Spanish King Philip V, arrived to Yanaca and decreed that the towns should be separated and formed into independent communities. It is supposed that the town of Yanaca that exists today was created at the end of the 16th or beginning of the 17th century, although Yanaca was previously a group of separate towns scattered throughout the valley.

== Andenes ==
Although there are various myths surrounding the creation of the andenes, they were constructed by pre-Incan peoples for farming, especially maize. People there still use this method today.

== Other Aspects of Ancient Culture ==
=== Apus ===
According to the ancient Andean religion, the Apus are deities represented by the mountains. In Yanaca, the Apus are called Tunay Kassa, Cóndor Carca, Solimana, Sara Sara, etc. Solimana and Sara Sara are the two primary deities of Yanaca's Apus, creating all the rest of Yanaca's apus. These deities controlled aspects of nature, like the rain and the harvest, but also fertility, illness, accidents, etc. There were rites carried out for the Apus like eh "tinka" or the "despacho" at certain times, especially at the start of the sowing season. The Pacha Mama and Pacha tierra were similarly revered.

=== Condorccarcca ===
Condorccarcca is a mountain located to the north east of Yanaca. It seems to have been a ceremonial site for the towns in the surrounding area. It might have served as an observatory, and the shade of the mountains protecting the valley could have signaled the agricultural cycles, solstices, and equinoxes.

== Anthropological and Historical Work in Yanaca ==
Very few studies have been conducted in this region of Peru. Doctor Juan Ossio Acuña, Peruvian Minister of Culture since September 2010, carried out a study in 1996 of the Yanaca people, including their traditions and their pre-Incan history. Doctor R. Tom Zuidema carried out studies about the Inca and mentioned Yanaca, stating that the Rimacvillca group belonged to this people.

== Bibliography ==
- Yanaca en la historia [Yanaca in history], Pedros José Rios Velasquez, 2000
- El primer nueva crónica y buen gobierno [The first good chronicle and good government], Felipe Guamán Poma de Ayala, 1944 (written between 1584 and 1615)
- Nueva crónica y buen gobierno [New chronicle and good government], Felipe Guamán Poma de Ayala, 1980 (written between 1584 and 1615)
- Primer nueva crónica [First new chronicle], Felipe Guamán Poma de Ayala, 1980 (written between 1584 and 1615)
- Misceláneas antárticas, Cabello de Balboa, 1952 (written in 1586)
- Comentarios reales de los incas. Historia general del Perú [Real commentary of the Inca. General history of Peru], Garcilaso de la Vega, 1960.
- Parentesco, reciprocidad y jerarquía en los Andes [Kinship, recipricocity, and hierarchy in the Andes], Juan Ossio Acuña, 1992
- Historia de los incas [History of the Inca], Franklin Pease G. Y. 1994
- Las crónicas y los Andes [The chronicles and the Andes], Franklin Pease G. Y. 1995
- Estructura andinas del poder [Andean power structures], María Rostworowski de Diez Canseco, 1996.
