= Toraya =

Toraya can refer to:

- Toraya Confectionery, Japan
- Toraya District, Peru
