= Lucre District =

Lucre District may refer to:

- Lucre District, Aymaraes, Peru
- Lucre District, Quispicanchi, Peru
