= Piste (disambiguation) =

Piste may refer to:

- Piste, a marked ski-run or path down a mountain
- Piste (fencing), the narrow strip along which the sport of fencing is played
- Piste (pétanque), the strip along which the sport of pétanque is played

== Locations ==
- Pisté, Yucatán, a village in Mexico.
- Pisti, also spelled Piste, a mountain in Peru
