= Pocohuanca District =

Coordinates: 14°13′01″S 73°04′59″W

Pocohuanca
- District
- Interactive map of Pocohuanca
- Country: Peru
- Region: Apurímac
- Province: Aymaraes
- Founded: October 8, 1951
- Capital: Pocohuanca

Government
  - Mayor: Mateo Soria Palomino

Area
  - Total: 82.55 km^{2} (31.87 sq mi)
- Elevation: 3,180 m (10,430 ft)

Population (2005 census)
  - Total: 1,277
  - Density: 15.47/km^{2} (40.07/sq mi)
- Time zone: UTC-5 (PET)
- UBIGEO: 030410

Pocohuanca District is one of the seventeen districts of the province Aymaraes in Peru.

== Ethnic groups ==
The people in the district are mainly indigenous citizens of Quechua descent. Quechua is the language which the majority of the population (80.11%) learnt to speak in childhood, 19.62% of the residents started speaking using the Spanish language (2007 Peru Census).
