= San Juan de Chacña District =

Coordinates: 13°55′26″S 73°10′54″W

San Juan de Chacña
- District
- Interactive map of San Juan de Chacña
- Country: Peru
- Region: Apurímac
- Province: Aymaraes
- Founded: April 17, 1964
- Capital: San Juan de Chacña

Government
  - Mayor: Jaime Antonio Torbisco Martinez

Area
  - Total: 86.13 km^{2} (33.25 sq mi)
- Elevation: 2,854 m (9,364 ft)

Population (2005 census)
  - Total: 1,269
  - Density: 14.73/km^{2} (38.16/sq mi)
- Time zone: UTC-5 (PET)
- UBIGEO: 030411

San Juan de Chacña District is one of the seventeen districts of the province Aymaraes in Peru.

== Ethnic groups ==
The people in the district are mainly indigenous citizens of Quechua descent. Quechua is the language which the majority of the population (88.15%) learnt to speak in childhood, 11.61% of the residents started speaking using the Spanish language (2007 Peru Census).
