= Kiswarani =

Mountain in Peru

- Location within Peru

Highest point
- Elevation: 4,800 m (15,700 ft)
- Coordinates: 14°20′28″S 73°04′04″W

Geography
- Location: Peru, Apurímac Region, Antabamba Province, Aymaraes Province
- Parent range: Andes

Kiswarani (Aymara: Kiswara, Spanish pronunciation: [Quishuarani]) (Note: Meaning Buddleja incana, -ni a suffix to indicate ownership, "the one with kiswara".) is a mountain in the Andes of Peru, about 4,800 metres (15,748 ft) high. It is located in the Apurímac Region, Antabamba Province, Sabaino District, and in the Aymaraes Province, Caraybamba District. Kiswarani lies southeast of Pisti.
