= Capaya District =

Coordinates: 14.119°S 73.318°W

Capaya
- District
- Interactive map of Capaya
- Country: Peru
- Region: Apurímac
- Province: Aymaraes
- Founded: January 12, 1956
- Capital: Capaya

Government
  - Mayor: Vitaliano Julian Arbieto Roldan

Area
  - Total: 77.75 km^{2} (30.02 sq mi)
- Elevation: 3,290 m (10,790 ft)

Population (2005 census)
  - Total: 738
  - Density: 9.49/km^{2} (24.6/sq mi)
- Time zone: UTC-5 (PET)
- UBIGEO: 030402

Capaya District is one of the seventeen districts of the province Aymaraes in Peru.

== Ethnic groups ==
The people in the district are mainly indigenous citizens of Quechua descent. Quechua is the language which the majority of the population (50.73%) learnt to speak in childhood, 48.98% of the residents started speaking using the Spanish language (2007 Peru Census).
