= Sabaino District =

Coordinates: 14°19′01″S 72°51′00″W

Sabaino
- District
- Interactive map of Sabaino
- Country: Peru
- Region: Apurímac
- Province: Antabamba
- Founded: August 20, 1872
- Capital: Sabaino

Government
  - Mayor: Marcelino Rojas Ramirez

Area
  - Total: 178.77 km^{2} (69.02 sq mi)
- Elevation: 3,433 m (11,263 ft)

Population (2005 census)
  - Total: 1,645
  - Density: 9.202/km^{2} (23.83/sq mi)
- Time zone: UTC-5 (PET)
- UBIGEO: 030307

Sabaino District is one of the seven districts of the province Antabamba in Peru.

== Ethnic groups ==
The people in the district are mainly indigenous citizens of Quechua descent. Quechua is the language which the majority of the population (75.72%) learnt to speak in childhood, 23.61% of the residents started speaking using the Spanish language (2007 Peru Census).

== See also ==
- Kiswarani
- Pisti
