= Caraybamba District =

Coordinates: 14°22′37″S 73°09′40″W

Caraybamba
- District
- Interactive map of Caraybamba
- Country: Peru
- Region: Apurímac
- Province: Aymaraes
- Founded: December 14, 1956
- Capital: Caraybamba

Government
  - Mayor: Jacinto Taipe Huamani

Area
  - Total: 234.91 km^{2} (90.70 sq mi)
- Elevation: 3,310 m (10,860 ft)

Population (2005 census)
  - Total: 1,307
  - Density: 5.564/km^{2} (14.41/sq mi)
- Time zone: UTC-5 (PET)
- UBIGEO: 030403

Caraybamba District is one of the seventeen districts of the Aymaraes Province in Peru.

== Geography ==
One of the highest peaks of the district is Pisti at approximately 5,100 m (16,700 ft). Other mountains are listed below:

- Allqa Marka
- Apu Marka
- Chunta
- Lluqu
- Kiswarani
- Puka Punchu
- Puka Salla
- Pumanuta
- Saya Qhata
- Saywa
- Wallulluni
- Waqra Wat'a
- Wayna Quta

== Ethnic groups ==
The people in the district are mainly indigenous citizens of Quechua descent. Quechua is the language which the majority of the population (54.06%) learnt to speak in childhood, 45.78% of the residents started speaking using the Spanish language (2007 Peru Census).
