= Justo Apu Sahuaraura District =

Coordinates: 13°51′47″S 73°04′23″W

Justo Apu Sahuaraura
- District
- Interactive map of Justo Apu Sahuaraura
- Country: Peru
- Region: Apurímac
- Province: Aymaraes
- Founded: September 27, 1984
- Capital: Pichihua

Government
  - Mayor: Marcos Rosalio Zavala Benites

Area
  - Total: 97.64 km^{2} (37.70 sq mi)
- Elevation: 3,150 m (10,330 ft)

Population (2005 census)
  - Total: 1,048
  - Density: 10.73/km^{2} (27.80/sq mi)
- Time zone: UTC-5 (PET)
- UBIGEO: 030408

Justo Apu Sahuaraura District is one of the seventeen districts of the province Aymaraes in Peru.

== Ethnic groups ==
The people in the district are mainly indigenous citizens of Quechua descent. Quechua is the language which the majority of the population (76.62%) learnt to speak in childhood, 23.28% of the residents started speaking using the Spanish language (2007 Peru Census).
