= Soraya District =

Coordinates: 14°09′47″S 73°18′43″W

Soraya
- District
- Interactive map of Soraya
- Country: Peru
- Region: Apurímac
- Province: Aymaraes
- Founded: January 2, 1857
- Capital: Soraya

Government
  - Mayor: Oscar Onton Quillama

Area
  - Total: 43.56 km^{2} (16.82 sq mi)
- Elevation: 2,870 m (9,420 ft)

Population (2005 census)
  - Total: 879
  - Density: 20.2/km^{2} (52.3/sq mi)
- Time zone: UTC-5 (PET)
- UBIGEO: 030413

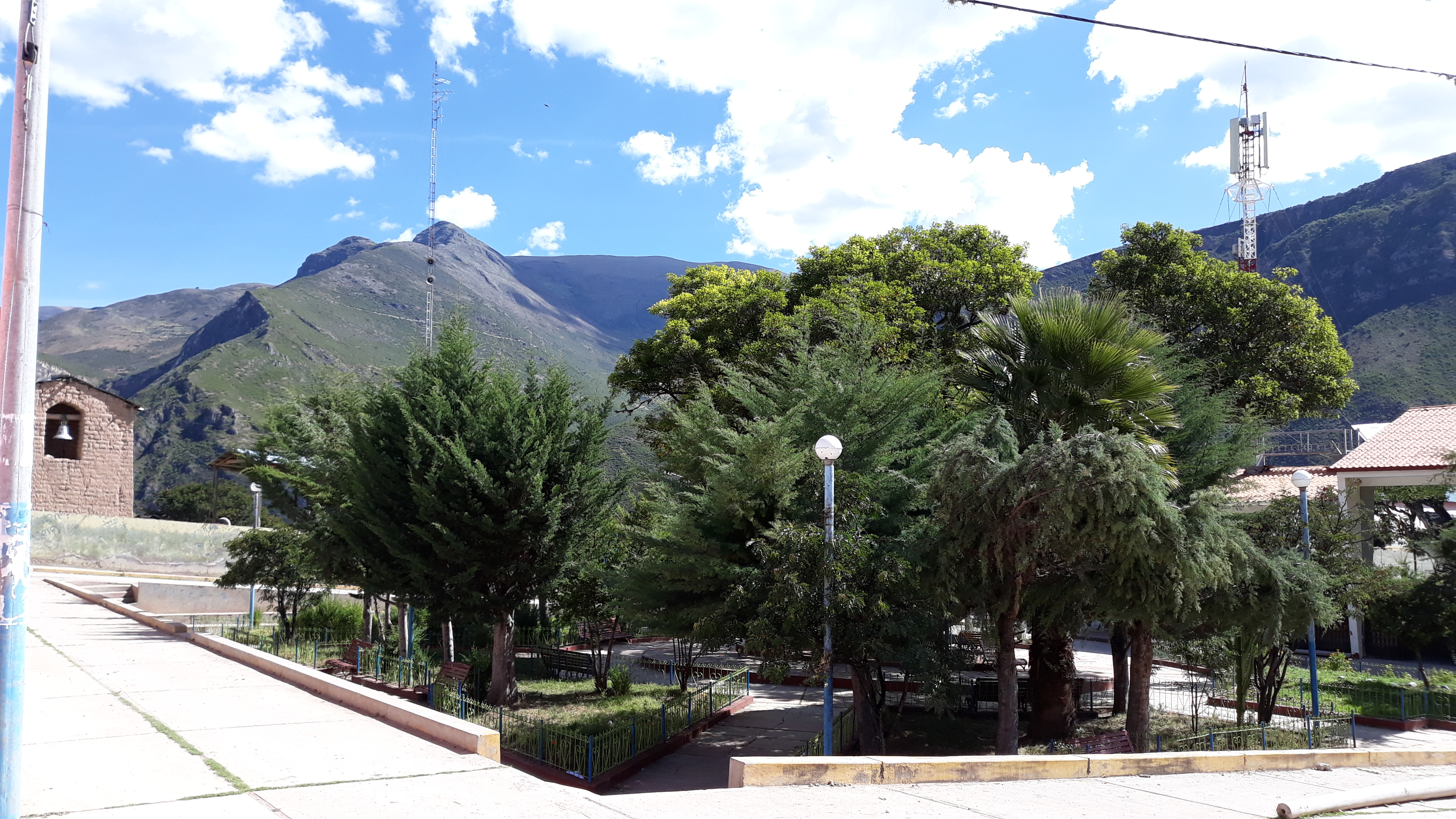
Plaza de Armas of the Soraya District

Soraya District is one of the seventeen districts of the province Aymaraes in Peru.

== Ethnic groups ==
The people in the district are mainly indigenous citizens of Quechua descent. Quechua is the language which the majority of the population (79.31%) learnt to speak in childhood, 20.00% of the residents started speaking using the Spanish language (2007 Peru Census).
