= Tapairihua District =

Coordinates: 14°08′24″S 73°08′35″W

Tapairihua
- District
- Interactive map of Tapairihua
- Country: Peru
- Region: Apurímac
- Province: Aymaraes
- Founded: January 2, 1857
- Capital: Tapairihua

Government
  - Mayor: Fortunato Retamozo Salinas

Area
  - Total: 163.73 km^{2} (63.22 sq mi)
- Elevation: 2,820 m (9,250 ft)

Population (2005 census)
  - Total: 2,770
  - Density: 16.9/km^{2} (43.8/sq mi)
- Time zone: UTC-5 (PET)
- UBIGEO: 030414

Tapairihua District is one of the seventeen districts of the province Aymaraes in Peru.

== Ethnic groups ==
The people in the district are mainly indigenous citizens of Quechua descent. Quechua is the language which the majority of the population (92.52%) learnt to speak in childhood, 7.23% of the residents started speaking using the Spanish language (2007 Peru Census).
