= Yanaca District =

Coordinates: 14°13′05″S 73°08′28″W

Yanaca
- District
- Interactive map of Yanaca
- Country: Peru
- Region: Apurímac
- Province: Aymaraes
- Founded: December 28, 1961
- Capital: Yanaca

Area
  - Total: 103.88 km^{2} (40.11 sq mi)
- Elevation: 3,340 m (10,960 ft)

Population (2005 census)
  - Total: 1,486
  - Density: 14.30/km^{2} (37.05/sq mi)
- Time zone: UTC-5 (PET)
- UBIGEO: 030417

Yanaca District is one of the seventeen districts of the Aymaraes Province in Peru.

== Geography ==
One of the highest peaks of the district is Qullqi Mina at approximately 4,800 m (15,700 ft). Other mountains are listed below:

- Apu Wansillu
- Kuntur K'ark'a
- Minas Q'asa
- Nina Q'asa
- Wayllayuq
- Yana Urqu

== Ethnic groups ==
The people in the district are mainly indigenous citizens of Quechua descent. Quechua is the language which the majority of the population (70.37%) learnt to speak in childhood, 29.27% of the residents started speaking using the Spanish language (2007 Peru Census).
