= Colcabamba District, Aymaraes =

Coordinates: 14°00′29″S 73°14′53″W

Colcabamba Qullqa Pampa
- District
- Interactive map of Colcabamba
- Country: Peru
- Region: Apurímac
- Province: Aymaraes
- Capital: Colcabamba

Government
  - Mayor: Gregorio Avendaño Salas

Area
  - Total: 95.75 km^{2} (36.97 sq mi)
- Elevation: 3,360 m (11,020 ft)

Population (2005 census)
  - Total: 805
  - Density: 8.41/km^{2} (21.8/sq mi)
- Time zone: UTC-5 (PET)
- UBIGEO: 030405

Colcabamba (from Quechua Qullqa Pampa, meaning "storehouse plain") is one of the seventeen districts of the Aymaraes Province in Peru.

== Geography ==
One of the highest peaks of the district is Saqra Urqu at approximately 4,400 m (14,400 ft). Other mountains are listed below:

- Allpaka
- Chuqa Ñawi
- Chuqu Waraka
- Ch'aki Qucha
- Qallpa Pata
- Minayuq
- Phiruruyuq
- Qachqalla
- Ruruchayuq
- Silla Q'asa
- Yana Urqu

== Ethnic groups ==
The people in the district are mainly indigenous citizens of Quechua descent. Quechua is the language which the majority of the population (70.41%) learnt to speak in childhood, 29.46% of the residents started speaking using the Spanish language (2007 Peru Census).
