= Cotaruse District =

Coordinates: 14°24′58″S 73°12′29″W

Cotaruse
- District
- Interactive map of Cotaruse
- Country: Peru
- Region: Apurímac
- Province: Aymaraes
- Founded: June 1, 1914
- Capital: Cotaruse

Government
  - Mayor: Alejandro Rojas Llacsa

Area
  - Total: 1,749.83 km^{2} (675.61 sq mi)
- Elevation: 3,248 m (10,656 ft)

Population (2005 census)
  - Total: 3,576
  - Density: 2.044/km^{2} (5.293/sq mi)
- Time zone: UTC-5 (PET)
- UBIGEO: 030406

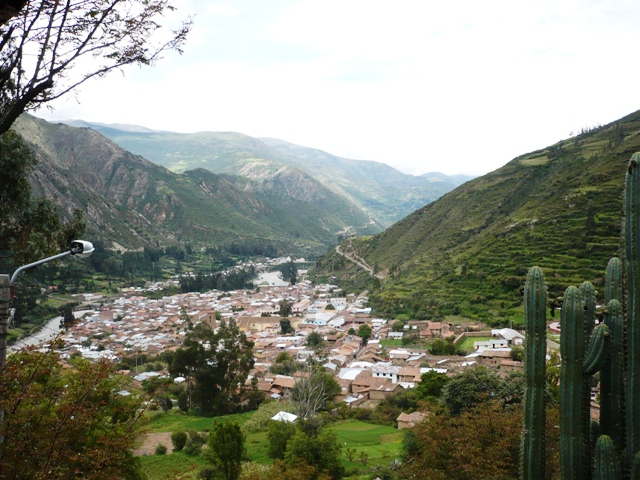
City of Chalhuanca

Cotaruse District is one of the seventeen districts of the Aymaraes Province in Peru.

== Geography ==
One of the highest peaks of the district is Pumanuta at approximately 4,800 m (15,700 ft). Other mountains are listed below:

- Altarniyuq
- Aqu Q'asa
- Aycha Qullqa
- Chachakuma
- Chawpi Urqu
- Ichhu Marka
- Ichhu Sirk'a
- Inka Pirqa
- Kampanayuq
- Kuntur Marka
- Llamuqa
- Ñawin Urqu
- Pampa Quriwiri
- Parqa Saywa
- Puka Kunka
- Puka Pata
- Pukar
- Puma Allqa
- Phiruru
- Qaqa Wasi
- Qullqa Pampa
- Q'illa Wachu
- Q'illu
- Q'illu Q'illu
- Runtu Marka
- Sallikani
- Sillu Sillu
- Sura Pata
- Tintaya
- Uma Q'asa
- Wachu Willka
- Wamanripa
- Wamanripayuq
- Wararani
- Waylla Kunka
- Yana Mach'ay
- Yana Pata
- Yana Saya
- Yanama
- Yunka Wasi

== Ethnic groups ==
The people in the district are mainly indigenous citizens of Quechua descent. Quechua is the language which the majority of the population (61.13%) learned to speak in childhood, while a minority (38.45%) of the residents learned to speak using the Spanish language (2007 Peru Census).
