= Tintay District =

Coordinates: 13°58′04″S 73°11′26″W

Tintay
- District
- Interactive map of Tintay
- Country: Peru
- Region: Apurímac
- Province: Aymaraes
- Founded: December 27, 1961
- Capital: Tintay

Government
  - Mayor: Aurelio Mendieta Arosto

Area
  - Total: 136.58 km^{2} (52.73 sq mi)
- Elevation: 2,772 m (9,094 ft)

Population (2005 census)
  - Total: 3,986
  - Density: 29.18/km^{2} (75.59/sq mi)
- Time zone: UTC-5 (PET)
- UBIGEO: 030415

Tintay District is one of the seventeen districts of the province Aymaraes in Peru.

== Ethnic groups ==
The people in the district are mainly indigenous citizens of Quechua descent. Quechua is the language which the majority of the population (81.56%) learnt to speak in childhood, 18.02% of the residents started speaking using the Spanish language (2007 Peru Census).
