= Chalhuanca District =

Coordinates: 14°18′04″S 73°13′52″W

Chalhuanca
- District
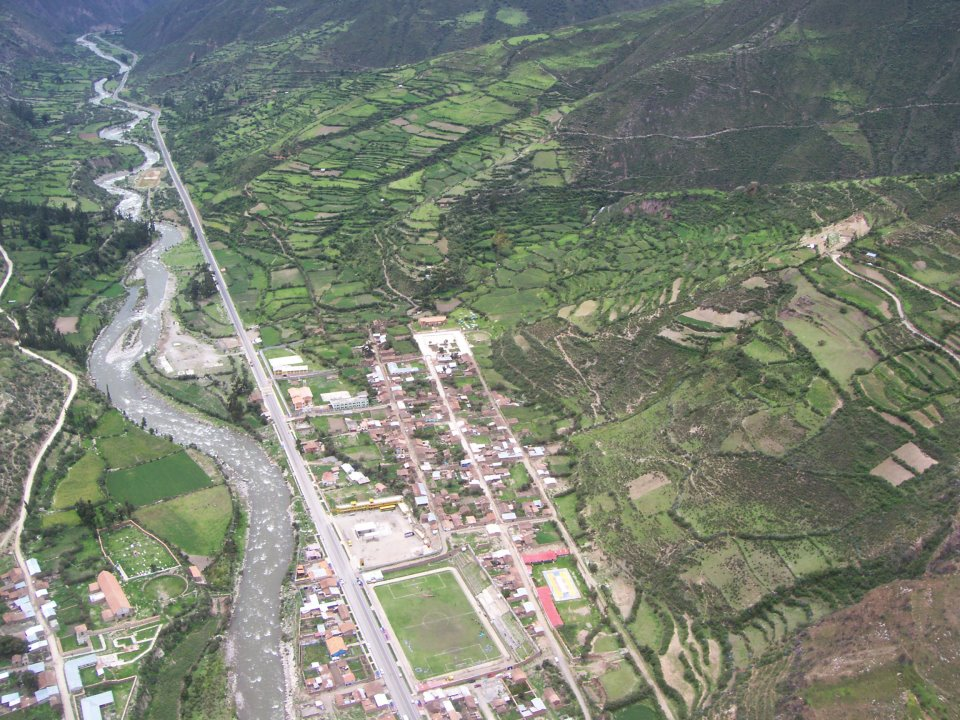
- Chalhuanca
- Interactive map of Chalhuanca
- Country: Peru
- Region: Apurímac
- Province: Aymaraes
- Capital: Chalhuanca

Government
  - Mayor: Sebastian Gonzalo Carbajal Zegarra

Area
  - Total: 322.34 km^{2} (124.46 sq mi)
- Elevation: 2,888 m (9,475 ft)

Population (2005 census)
  - Total: 4,658
  - Density: 14.45/km^{2} (37.43/sq mi)
- Time zone: UTC-5 (PET)
- UBIGEO: 030401

Chalhuanca District is one of the seventeen districts of the Aymaraes Province in Peru.

== Geography ==
One of the highest peaks of the district is Pisti at approximately 5,100 m (16,700 ft). Other mountains are listed below:

- Apu Wansillu
- Chawpi Urqu
- Hatun Waraqu
- Kampanayuq
- Millu
- Muruni
- Nina Q'asa
- Pilluni
- Qucha Pampa
- Qucha Qucha
- Qura Unu
- Q'illu Qaqa
- Wayna P'ukru
- Wayra Tuqlla
- Sinqa Sinqa
- T'uru P'unqu
- Wallulluni
- Wayllayuq
- Yana Ranra
- Yana Qucha
- Yana Urqu
- Yawri Qucha

== Climate ==
Climate data for Chalhuanca, elevation 2,964 m (9,724 ft)
Month	Jan	Feb	Mar	Apr	May	Jun	Jul	Aug	Sep	Oct	Nov	Dec	Year
Mean daily maximum °C (°F)	22.5 (72.5)	22.7 (72.9)	22.1 (71.8)	23.1 (73.6)	23.7 (74.7)	23.2 (73.8)	23.1 (73.6)	24.0 (75.2)	24.0 (75.2)	25.6 (78.1)	25.9 (78.6)	24.8 (76.6)	23.7 (74.7)
Daily mean °C (°F)	16.0 (60.8)	16.1 (61.0)	15.7 (60.3)	15.4 (59.7)	14.3 (57.7)	13.5 (56.3)	13.6 (56.5)	14.6 (58.3)	15.6 (60.1)	16.7 (62.1)	17.2 (63.0)	17.0 (62.6)	15.5 (59.9)
Mean daily minimum °C (°F)	9.5 (49.1)	9.5 (49.1)	9.3 (48.7)	7.6 (45.7)	4.9 (40.8)	3.7 (38.7)	4.0 (39.2)	5.2 (41.4)	7.1 (44.8)	7.7 (45.9)	8.4 (47.1)	9.1 (48.4)	7.2 (44.9)
Average precipitation mm (inches)	182.6 (7.19)	175.0 (6.89)	116.4 (4.58)	51.5 (2.03)	11.4 (0.45)	6.7 (0.26)	12.1 (0.48)	13.0 (0.51)	15.6 (0.61)	46.5 (1.83)	29.6 (1.17)	116.3 (4.58)	776.7 (30.58)
Source 1: Municipalidad Distrital de Kishuara
Source 2: National Meteorology and Hydrology Service of Peru (precipitation 1991–2020)
