= Chalhuanca =

Chalhuanca Challwanka
- Town
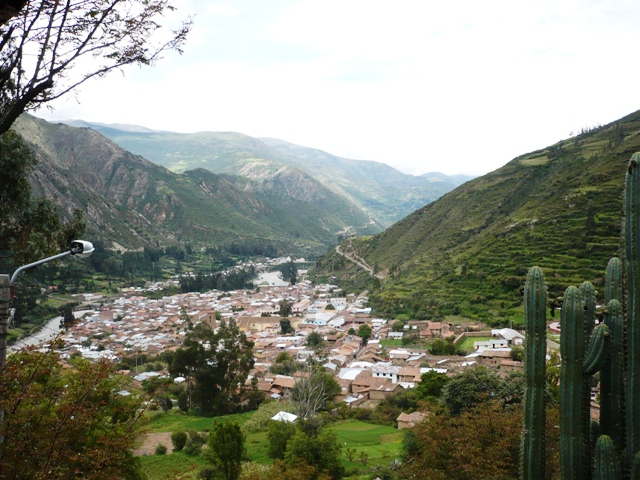
- Chalhuanca, situated on the Chalhuanca River

- Location within Peru
- Coordinates: 14°17′42″S 73°14′40″W
- Country: Peru
- Region: Apurímac Region
- Province: Aymaraes Province
- District: Chalhuanca District

Government
  - Mayor: Sebastian Gonzalo Carbajal Zegarra
- Elevation: 2,888 m (9,475 ft)

Population
  - Total: 27,857

Chalhuanca is a Peruvian city, the capital of the district of the same name and the province of Aymaraes, located in the department of Apurímac. It has a population of 27,857 inhabitants, mostly engaged in agricultural and mining activities.

== Etymology ==
There is speculation about the origin of the name. It is agreed that part of the toponym can be broken down into the Quechua word "challwa" meaning 'fish'. Cerrón Palomino proposes the hypothesis that the name can be decomposed into "challwa" and the Quechua suffix "-nqa," meaning 'fishing place.' This suffix would have been a deverbal and denominal derivational suffix functioning as a future participle. With toponyms, it would have been used with the meaning of 'place prone to (something)' or 'place intended for (something),' maintaining the nuance of the future participle. Thus, it results in the given meaning of 'place for fishing.'

== Geography ==
Chalhuanca is situated in the southern part of the country at 2897 meters above sea level on the eastern slope of the Andes mountain range, on the banks of the Chalhuanca River, an indirect tributary of the Apurímac River.

== Climate ==
Climate data for Chalhuanca, elevation 2,964 m (9,724 ft), (1991–2020)
Month	Jan	Feb	Mar	Apr	May	Jun	Jul	Aug	Sep	Oct	Nov	Dec	Year
Mean daily maximum °C (°F)	26.0 (78.8)	25.2 (77.4)	25.4 (77.7)	25.4 (77.7)	26.6 (79.9)	26.1 (79.0)	26.1 (79.0)	26.6 (79.9)	27.1 (80.8)	27.1 (80.8)	29.0 (84.2)	27.5 (81.5)	26.5 (79.7)
Mean daily minimum °C (°F)	6.3 (43.3)	6.8 (44.2)	6.6 (43.9)	5.2 (41.4)	1.8 (35.2)	1.3 (34.3)	1.2 (34.2)	2.3 (36.1)	4.2 (39.6)	4.7 (40.5)	4.9 (40.8)	5.8 (42.4)	4.3 (39.7)
Average precipitation mm (inches)	182.6 (7.19)	175.0 (6.89)	116.4 (4.58)	51.5 (2.03)	11.4 (0.45)	6.7 (0.26)	12.1 (0.48)	13.0 (0.51)	15.6 (0.61)	46.5 (1.83)	29.6 (1.17)	116.3 (4.58)	776.7 (30.58)
Source: National Meteorology and Hydrology Service of Peru

== Places of Interest ==
One of the attractions of Chalhuanca is the Pincahuacho hot springs, which have medicinal waters. 29 km west of the town of Chalhuanca on the road to Puquio, it hosts shrublands and patches of Polylepis and Polylepis-Gynoxis forests, and on the slopes, cacti and bromeliads.

== Notable people ==
- Dina Boluarte (born 1962), the 64th and the first female President of Peru was born in Chalhuanca.

== Sports ==
Chalhuanca is famous for being one of the best places in Peru for practicing all types of extreme sports, especially canoeing.

== Culture ==
Fiesta Señor de Ánimas: One of the most important cultural attractions in the region is the Major Festival of Apurímac, known as the patronal festival of the Lord of the Souls of Chalhuanca, which is celebrated from July 25 to August 5 each year. Of national significance is the bullfight with a condor called Yawar Fiesta or Toro Pukllay. It was declared a Cultural Heritage of the Nation by the Ministry of Culture.
