= Huayllo District =

Coordinates: 14.119°S 73.318°W

Huayllo Wayllu
- District
- Interactive map of Huayllo; Wayllu
- Country: Peru
- Region: Apurímac
- Province: Aymaraes
- Founded: May 12, 1960
- Capital: Huayllo

Government
  - Mayor: Elio Garay Roldan

Area
  - Total: 72.89 km^{2} (28.14 sq mi)
- Elevation: 3,139 m (10,299 ft)

Population (2005 census)
  - Total: 721
  - Density: 9.89/km^{2} (25.6/sq mi)
- Time zone: UTC-5 (PET)
- UBIGEO: 030407

Huayllo District is one of the seventeen districts of the province Aymaraes in Peru.

== Ethnic groups ==
The people in the district are mainly indigenous citizens of Quechua descent. Quechua is the language which the majority of the population (63.39%) learnt to speak in childhood, 36.27% of the residents started speaking using the Spanish language (2007 Peru Census).
