= Sañayca District =

Coordinates: 14°12′33″S 73°21′43″W

Sañayca
- District
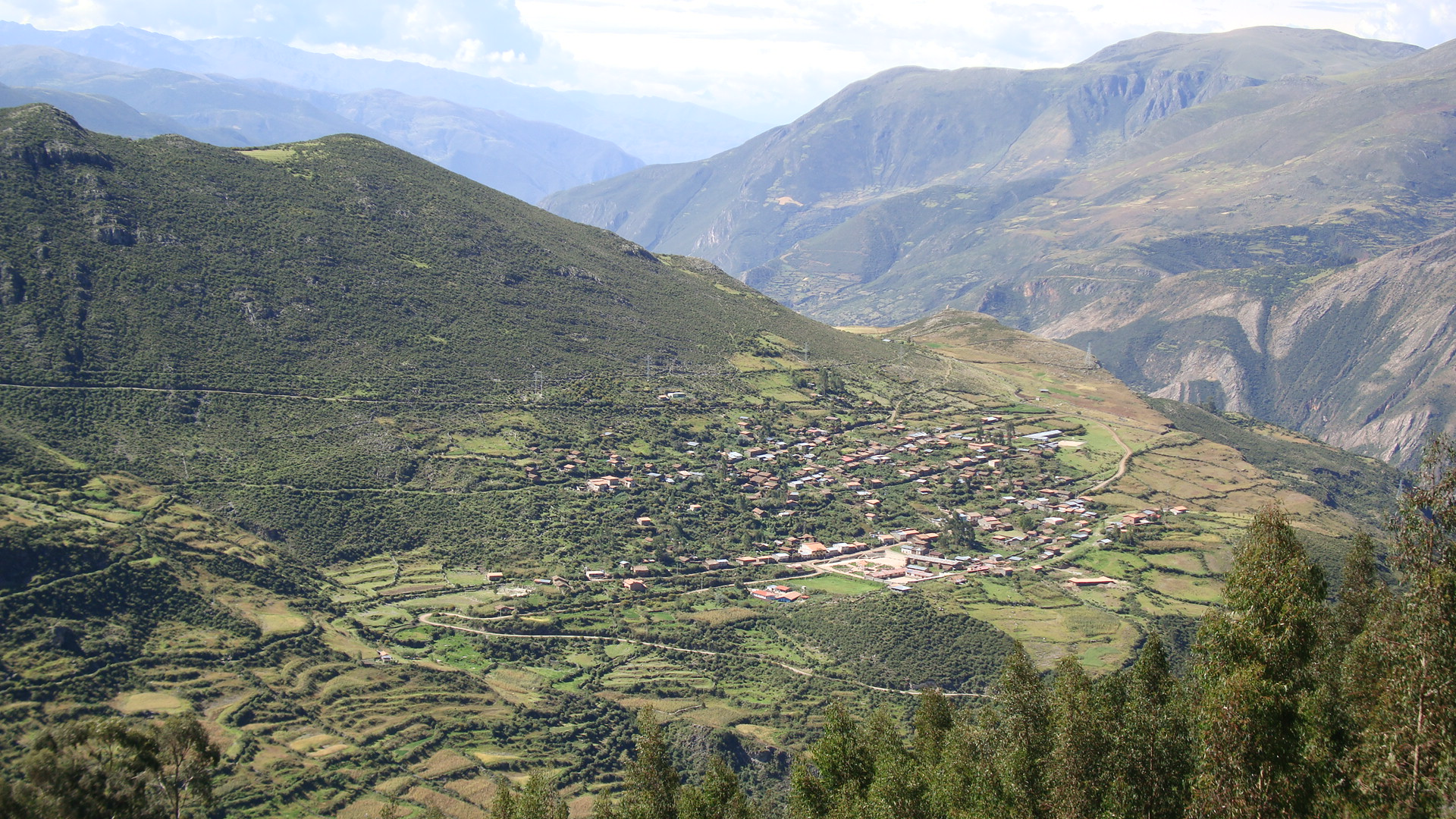
- Interactive map of Sañayca
- Country: Peru
- Region: Apurímac
- Province: Aymaraes
- Founded: November 14, 1944
- Capital: Sañayca

Government
  - Mayor: Ivan Cortez Terrazas

Area
  - Total: 448.91 km^{2} (173.33 sq mi)
- Elevation: 3,370 m (11,060 ft)

Population (2005 census)
  - Total: 1,354
  - Density: 3.016/km^{2} (7.812/sq mi)
- Time zone: UTC-5 (PET)
- UBIGEO: 030412

Sañayca District is one of the seventeen districts of the Aymaraes Province in Peru.

== Geography ==
One of the highest peaks of the district is Hatun Wamanwiri at approximately 4,400 m (14,400 ft). Other mountains are listed below:

- Aqu Q'asa
- Chawpi Urqu
- Ichhu Marka
- Ichhu Urqu
- Kirki Q'asa
- Kuntur Marka
- Kuntur Wachu
- Llulluch'a
- Llulluch'aw
- Ñawpa Llaqta
- Pichqa Pukyu
- Pilluni
- Puka Qucha
- P'unqu
- Qucha Qucha
- Qullpa
- Qura Unu
- Siwi Sirk'a
- Sullka Wamanwiri
- Waylla Qucha
- Yana Mach'ay
- Yana Urqu

== Ethnic groups ==
The people in the district are mainly indigenous citizens of Quechua descent. Quechua is the language which the majority of the population (84.15%) learnt to speak in childhood, 15.44% of the residents started speaking using the Spanish language (2007 Peru Census).
