= Chapimarca District =

Coordinates: 13°58′26″S 73°03′47″W

Chapimarca Chapi Marka
- District
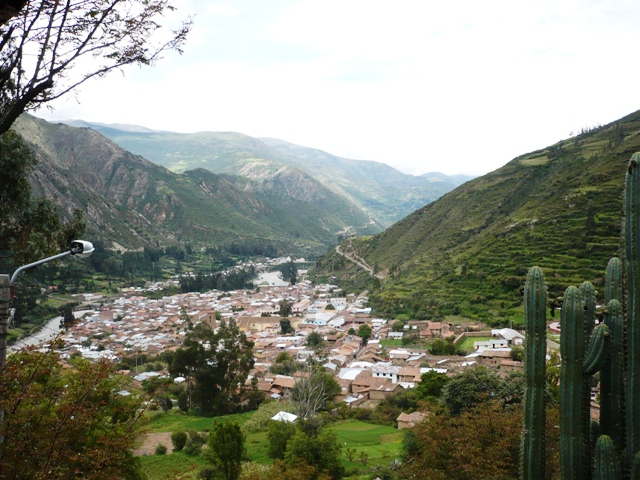
- Interactive map of Chapimarca
- Country: Peru
- Region: Apurímac
- Province: Aymaraes
- Founded: January 2, 1857
- Capital: Chapimarca

Government
  - Mayor: Gregorio Caillahua Pocco

Area
  - Total: 213.09 km^{2} (82.27 sq mi)
- Elevation: 3,414 m (11,201 ft)

Population (2005 census)
  - Total: 2,552
  - Density: 11.98/km^{2} (31.02/sq mi)
- Time zone: UTC-5 (PET)
- UBIGEO: 030404

Chapimarca District is one of the seventeen districts of the Aymaraes Province in Peru.

== Geography ==
One of the highest peaks of the district is Saqra Urqu at approximately 4,400 m (14,400 ft). Other mountains are listed below:

- Añu Pata
- Apachita
- Ch'aki Qucha
- Hatun Puchka
- Ichhu Rutuna
- Kiska Pata
- Kuntur Qaqa
- K'usi
- Mawk'a Llaqta
- Mina Waqsa
- Parqa Marka
- Parqa Rumi
- Puma Qucha
- Qachqa Marka
- Q'illu Q'asa
- Sulimana
- Suparawra
- Taya Q'asa
- Tuqtuqa
- T'akra Qucha Q'asa
- Urqu Pata
- Yuraq Pukyu

== Ethnic groups ==
The people in the district are mainly indigenous citizens of Quechua descent. Quechua is the language which the majority of the population (83.97%) learnt to speak in childhood, 15.78% of the residents started speaking using the Spanish language (2007 Peru Census).
