= Aymaraes province =

Coordinates: 14.301°S 73.231°W

Aymaraes
- Province
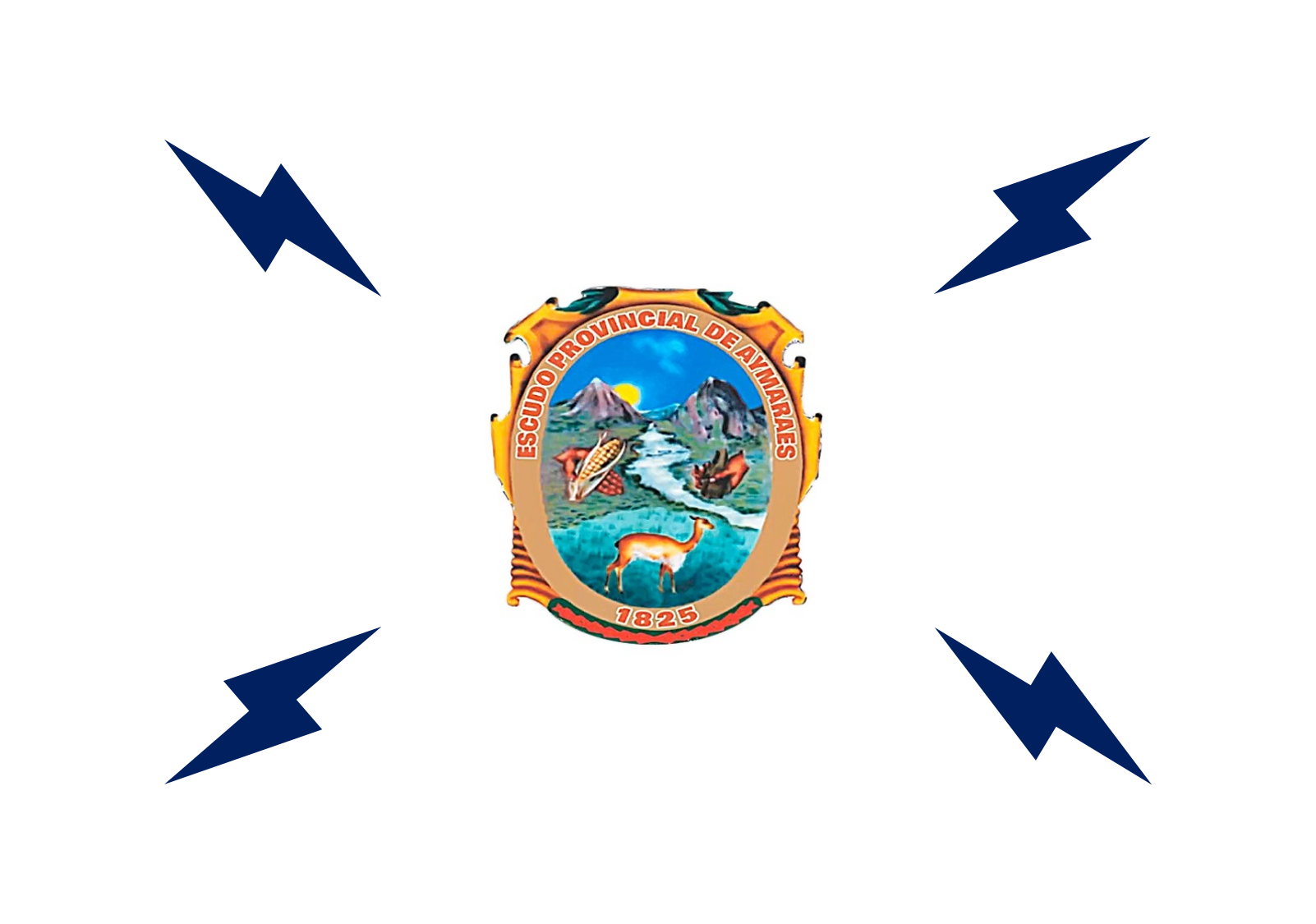
- Flag

- Location of Aymaraes in the Apurímac Region
- Country: Peru
- Region: Apurímac
- Founded: June 21, 1824
- Capital: Chalhuanca

Area
  - Total: 4,213.07 km^{2} (1,626.68 sq mi)

Population
  - Total: 27,598
  - Density: 6.5506/km^{2} (16.966/sq mi)
- UBIGEO: 0304
- Website: www.municipioaymaraes.gob.pe

Aymaraes is the largest of the seven provinces of the Apurímac Region in Peru. The capital of the province is the city of Chalhuanca. The province was founded by General Simón Bolívar on June 21, 1824.

== Boundaries ==
- North: the provinces of Andahuaylas and Abancay
- East: the provinces of Abancay and Antabamba
- South: Ayacucho Region
- West: Ayacucho Region and the province of Andahuaylas

== Geography ==
One of the highest peaks of the province is Pisti at approximately 5,100 m (16,700 ft). Other mountains are listed below:

- Chachakuma
- Chawpi Urqu
- Ch'ankhara
- Ch'uychu Llamuqa
- Huch'uy Ñawincha
- Kiswarani
- Ñawin Urqu
- Puka Kunka
- Puka Urqu
- Puma Ranra
- Puman Uta
- Qaqa Wasi
- Qullqi Mina
- Q'illu Q'illu
- Sara Sara
- Saya Qhata
- Uma Ch'alla
- Waman Pirqa
- Wamanripa
- Waqra Wat'a
- Wayllayuq
- Wayna P'ukru
- Wayna Quta
- Wisk'achayuq

== Political division ==
The province measures 1,242.33 square kilometres (479.67 sq mi) and is divided into seventeen districts:

- Chalhuanca
- Capaya
- Caraybamba
- Chapimarca
- Colcabamba
- Cotaruse
- Huayllo
- Justo Apu Sahuaraura
- Lucre
- Pocohuanca
- San Juan de Chacña
- Sañayca
- Soraya
- Tapairihua
- Tintay
- Toraya
- Yanaca

== Ethnic groups ==
The people in the province are mainly indigenous citizens of Quechua descent. Quechua is the language which the majority of the population (71.05%) learnt to speak in childhood, 28.61% of the residents started speaking using the Spanish language and 0.15% using Aymara (2007 Peru Census).
