= Pisti =

Mountain in Peru

- Location within Peru

Highest point
- Elevation: 5,100 m (16,700 ft)
- Coordinates: 14°19′45″S 73°04′50″W

Geography
- Location: Peru, Apurímac Region, Antabamba Province, Aymaraes Province
- Parent range: Andes

Pisti (Aymara and Quechua for influenca, a common cold or plague, also spelled Piste) is a mountain in the Andes of Peru, about 5,100 metres (16,732 ft) high. It is located in the Apurímac Region, Antabamba Province, Sabaino District, and in the Aymaraes Province, on the border of the districts of Caraybamba and Chalhuanca. Pisti lies northwest of Kiswarani.
