= Lucre District, Aymaraes =

Coordinates: 13°57′04″S 73°13′41″W

Lucre
- District
- Interactive map of Lucre
- Country: Peru
- Region: Apurímac
- Province: Aymaraes
- Founded: March 24, 1960
- Founder: Los Ríos
- Capital: Lucre

Government
  - Mayor: Marcos Orosco Guillen

Area
  - Total: 110.48 km^{2} (42.66 sq mi)
- Elevation: 2,800 m (9,200 ft)

Population (2005 census)
  - Total: 2,391
  - Density: 21.64/km^{2} (56.05/sq mi)
- Time zone: UTC-5 (PET)
- UBIGEO: 030409

Lucre District is one of the seventeen districts of the province Aymaraes in Peru.

== Ethnic groups ==
The people in the district are mainly indigenous citizens of Quechua descent. Quechua is the language which the majority of the population (90.73%) learnt to speak in childhood, 9.01% of the residents started speaking using the Spanish language (2007 Peru Census).
