= Toraya District =

Coordinates: 14°03′15″S 73°18′27″W

Toraya
- District
- Interactive map of Toraya
- Country: Peru
- Region: Apurímac
- Province: Aymaraes
- Founded: July 15, 1936
- Capital: Toraya

Government
  - Mayor: Simon Merino Gonzales

Area
  - Total: 173.05 km^{2} (66.81 sq mi)
- Elevation: 3,146 m (10,322 ft)

Population (2005 census)
  - Total: 1,684
  - Density: 9.731/km^{2} (25.20/sq mi)
- Time zone: UTC-5 (PET)
- UBIGEO: 030416

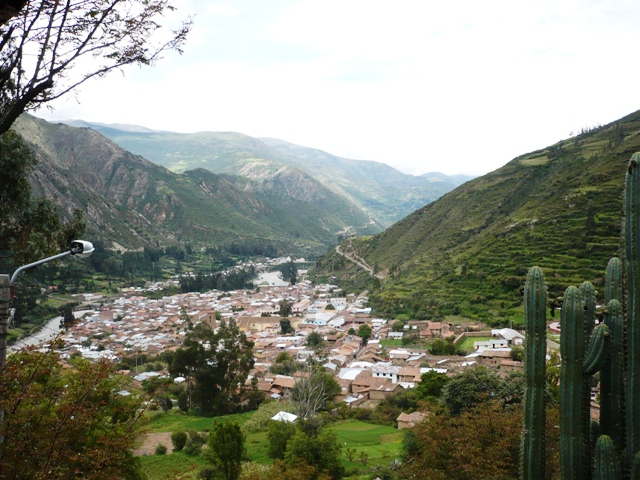
View of Toraya

Toraya District is one of the seventeen districts of the Aymaraes Province in Peru.

== Geography ==
One of the highest peaks of the district is P'unquchayuq at approximately 4,400 m (14,400 ft). Other mountains are listed below:

- Anta Urqu
- Aqchipa Wachana
- Aymara
- Chuqu Waraka
- Kuntur Wachana
- Kunturillu
- Lliwa Urqu
- Minayuq
- Puka T'uruyuq
- Puma Ranra
- Qucha Llink'i
- Quchayuq
- Titiyuq
- Uqhu Rumi

== Ethnic groups ==
The people in the district are mainly indigenous citizens of Quechua descent. Quechua is the language which the majority of the population (82.55%) learnt to speak in childhood, 16.96% of the residents started speaking using the Spanish language (2007 Peru Census).
