= Los Errantes de Chuquibamba =

- Origin: Chuquibamba, Arequipa, Peru
- Genres: Huayno; yaraví; marinera
- Label: Odeón del Perú · Iempsa
- Past members: Gilberto Cueva; Plinio Mogrovejo; Antonio Alarcón

Los Errantes de Chuquibamba (lit. 'The Wanderers of Chuquibamba') was an Andean music group from the town of Chuquibamba, in Condesuyos province, department of Arequipa, Peru. It was founded by Antonio Alarcón Sierra, Gilberto Eleodoro Cueva Fernández, and Plinio Feliciano Mogrovejo Luque.

== History ==
Gilberto Cueva, Antonio Alarcón, and Plinio Mogrovejo were three childhood friends who lived in Chuquibamba. Cueva recounts that, at nine or ten years old, he was already singing Latin songs during masses, novenas, processions, and even burials. In 1950, they decided to formalize the group, but it was in 1959, when Cueva—then working at a record label in Lima—reunited with Mogrovejo, that they recorded some songs together with the Cusco-based group Cumbres del Perú. The following year, Alarcón joined the group, and the trio Los Errantes was born.

The trio undertook their first major tour in 1962, in the city of Cusco. From then on, their performances multiplied, reaching more than three hundred cities and towns throughout Peru. They were responsible for popularizing the huayno de salón, a more elegant and refined style of huayno adapted for indoor settings, ballrooms, and social gatherings of the urban middle class.

Antonio Alarcón passed away in 1995, Gilberto Cueva passed away in 2010, and Plinio Mogrovejo passed away in 2021. In 1995, due to their important contributions to Peruvian music, the then National Institute of Culture awarded them the Medalla Kuntur, a symbol of the National Folklore Prize. In 2010, on the occasion of their 50-year career, the Congress of the Republic of Peru paid them a special tribute.

== Discography ==
- Cantan Los Errantes (1962)
- Tierra Arequipeña (1963)
- Noches Mistianas (1963)
- Paisajes Chuquibambinos (1964)
- Otro Estilo Errante (1965)
- Lagunita (1968)
- Con el Corazón... Como Antes (1969)
- Por Supuesto... Los Errantes (1971)
- Majestuoso Misti (1975)
- ¡Errantes Hasta La Muerte! (1979)
- Cancionero de Oro (1981)
- Las Trovas, Los Errantes – ¡Oh... Chuquibamba! (1982)
- 25 Años Juntos (1984)
- Los Errantes (2000)

== See also ==
- Picaflor de los Andes
- Pastorita Huaracina
