= Andaray District =

Coordinates: 15.8094°S 72.8672°W

Andaray
- District
- Interactive map of Andaray
- Country: Peru
- Region: Arequipa
- Province: Condesuyos
- Founded: January 2, 1857
- Capital: Andaray

Government
  - Mayor: Galo Miguel Sarmiento Sanchez

Area
  - Total: 847.56 km^{2} (327.24 sq mi)
- Elevation: 3,050 m (10,010 ft)

Population (2005 census)
  - Total: 808
  - Density: 0.953/km^{2} (2.47/sq mi)
- Time zone: UTC-5 (PET)
- UBIGEO: 040602

Andaray District is one of eight districts of the province Condesuyos in Peru.

== See also ==
- Coropuna
- Pallaqucha
