= Tirani =

Mountain in Peru

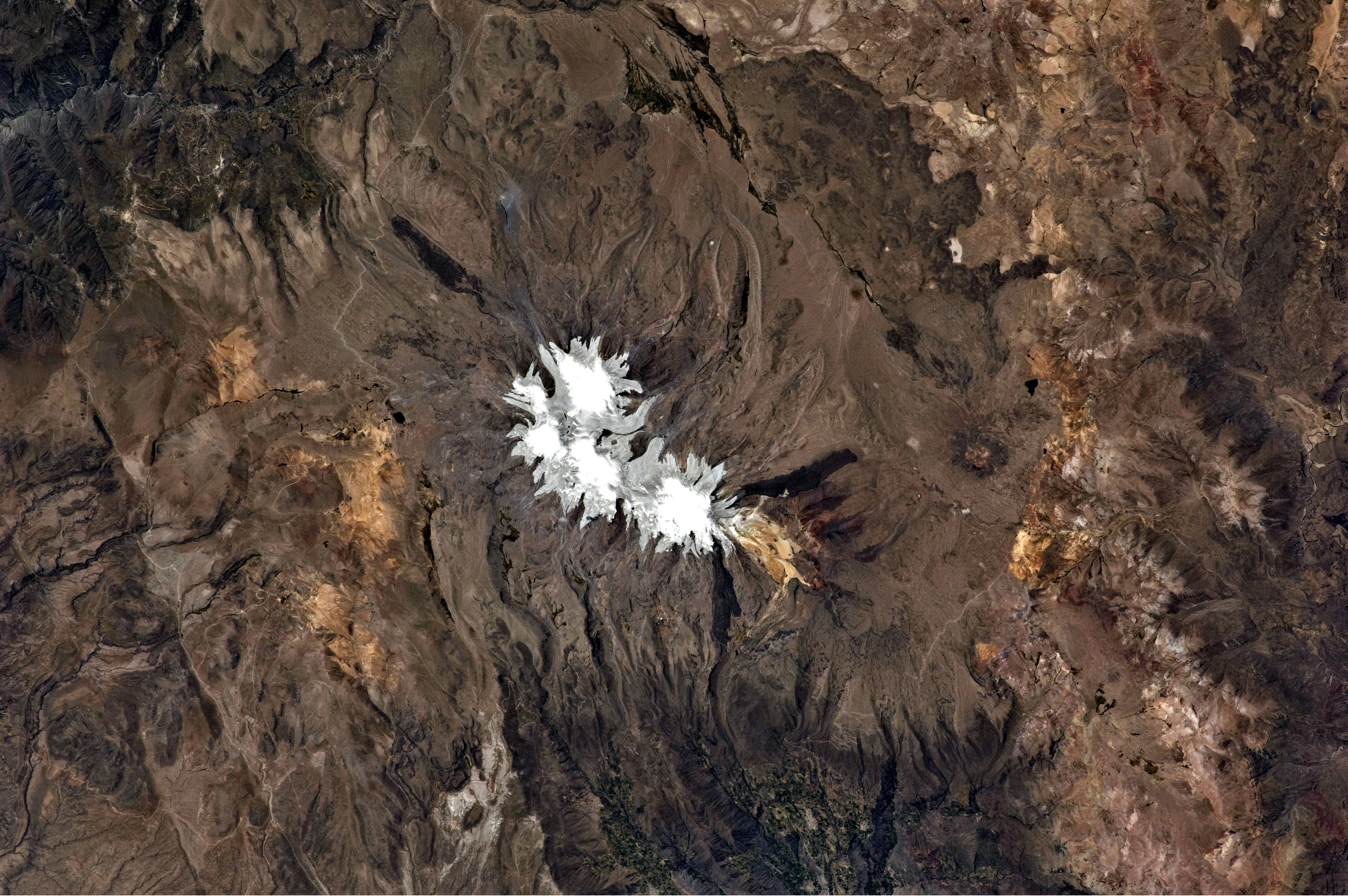
- Coropuna (snow-covered) and Tirani (upper right edge of this image) as seen from the air

Highest point
- Elevation: 5,105 m (16,749 ft)
- Coordinates: 15°20′06″S 72°33′07″W

Geography
- Location within Peru
- Location: Peru, Arequipa Region, Condesuyos Province
- Parent range: Andes

Tirani (Aymara tira cradle, -ni a suffix, "the one with a cradle", also spelled Tirane) is a 5,106-metre-high (16,752 ft) mountain in the Andes of Peru. It is situated in the Arequipa Region, Condesuyos Province, on the border of the districts of Cayarani and Salamanca.
