= Ñawicha =

Mountain in Peru

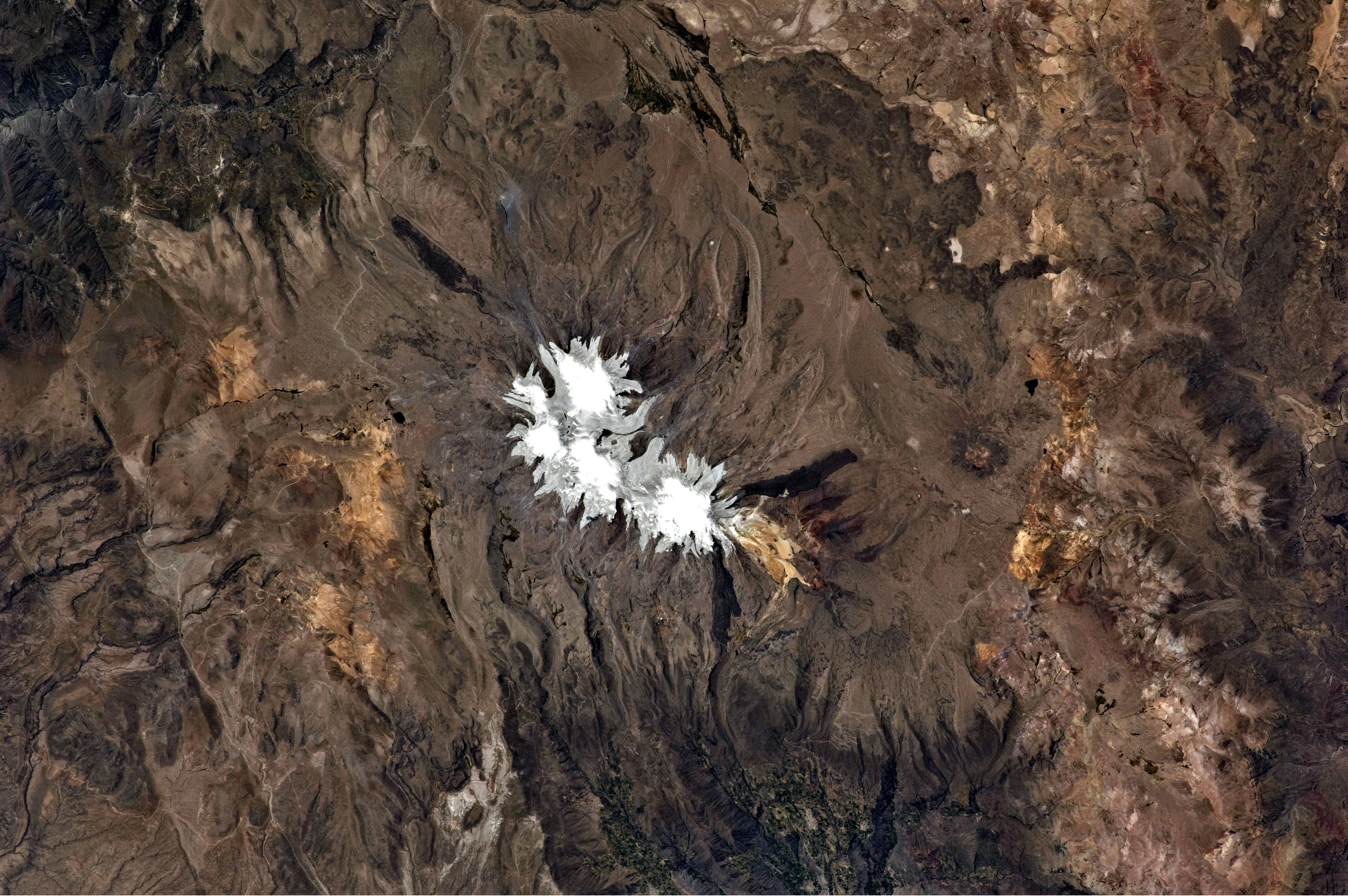
- Coropuna (snow-covered) and Ñawicha (lower left) as seen from the ISS (north is to the upper right part of this image)

Highest point
- Elevation: 4,558.3 m (14,955 ft)
- Coordinates: 15°40′21″S 72°43′43″W

Geography
- Location within Peru
- Location: Peru, Arequipa Region, Condesuyos Province
- Parent range: Andes

Ñawicha (Quechua ñawi eye, -cha a suffix, "little eye", also spelled Ñahuicha) is a mountain in the Arequipa Region in the Andes of Peru, about 4,558.3 metres (14,955 ft) high. It is situated in the Condesuyos Province, Chuquibamba District, southwest of the Coropuna volcano and mount Minasniyuq (Quechua for "the one with a mine", also spelled Minasnioc).
