= Puma Ranra =

Puma Ranra (Quechua puma cougar, ranra stony place, Hispanicized spellings Poma Ranra, Pomarangra, Pomaranra, Puma Rangra, Pumarangra, erroneously also Pumrangra) may refer to:

- Puma Ranra (Castilla-Condesuyos), a mountain on the border of the Castilla Province and the Condesuyos Province, Arequipa Region, Peru
- Puma Ranra (Condesuyos), a mountain in the Condesuyos Province, Arequipa Region, Peru
- Puma Ranra (Lima), a mountain in the Lima Region, Peru
