= Cayarani District =

Coordinates: 14.6831°S 72.0231°W

Cayarani
- District
- Interactive map of Cayarani
- Country: Peru
- Region: Arequipa
- Province: Condesuyos
- Founded: January 2, 1857
- Capital: Cayarani

Government
  - Mayor: Benigno Ahuate Mollo

Area
  - Total: 1,395.67 km^{2} (538.87 sq mi)
- Elevation: 3,920 m (12,860 ft)

Population (2005 census)
  - Total: 2,623
  - Density: 1.879/km^{2} (4.868/sq mi)
- Time zone: UTC-5 (PET)
- UBIGEO: 040603

Cayarani District is one of eight districts of the province Condesuyos in Peru.

== Geography ==
The Wansu mountain range traverses the district. Some of the highest mountains of the district are listed below:

- Allqa Q'awa
- Anka Phawa
- Chuqllu Chuqllu
- Hatun Q'asa
- Inka Misa
- Janq'u Q'awa
- Kuntur Pillu
- Kuntur Salla
- Kunturi
- Mama Wasi
- Misani
- Puka Qaqa
- Pukara
- Puma Ranra
- Puma Willka
- Qillqata
- Qucha Q'asa
- Q'illuqucha
- Saxa Q'awa
- Sura
- Tanka
- Tirani
- T'allani Urqu
- Uma Qala
- Urqu Puñuna
- Waraqu
- Waych'awi
- Waych'a Waqi
- Yana Qaqa
- Yana Yana
- Yuraq Q'asa

== Ethnic groups ==
The people in the district are mainly indigenous citizens of Quechua descent. Quechua is the language which the majority of the population (74.58%) learnt to speak in childhood, 24.96% of the residents started speaking using the Spanish language (2007 Peru Census).
