= T'allani Urqu =

Mountain in Peru

- Location within Peru

Highest point
- Elevation: 4,900 m (16,100 ft)
- Coordinates: 14°49′26″S 71°56′06″W

Geography
- Location: Peru, Arequipa Region
- Parent range: Andes

T'allani Urqu (Aymara t'alla noble woman, lady, -ni a suffix, Quechua urqu mountain, "the mountain with a noble woman", Hispanicized spelling Tallani Orcco) is a mountain in the Andes of Peru which reaches a height of approximately 4,900 m (16,100 ft). It is located in the Arequipa Region, Caylloma Province, Caylloma District, and in the Condesuyos Province, Cayarani District. T'allani Urqu lies southeast of Kuntur Salla.
