= Hatun K'irawniyuq =

Mountain in Peru

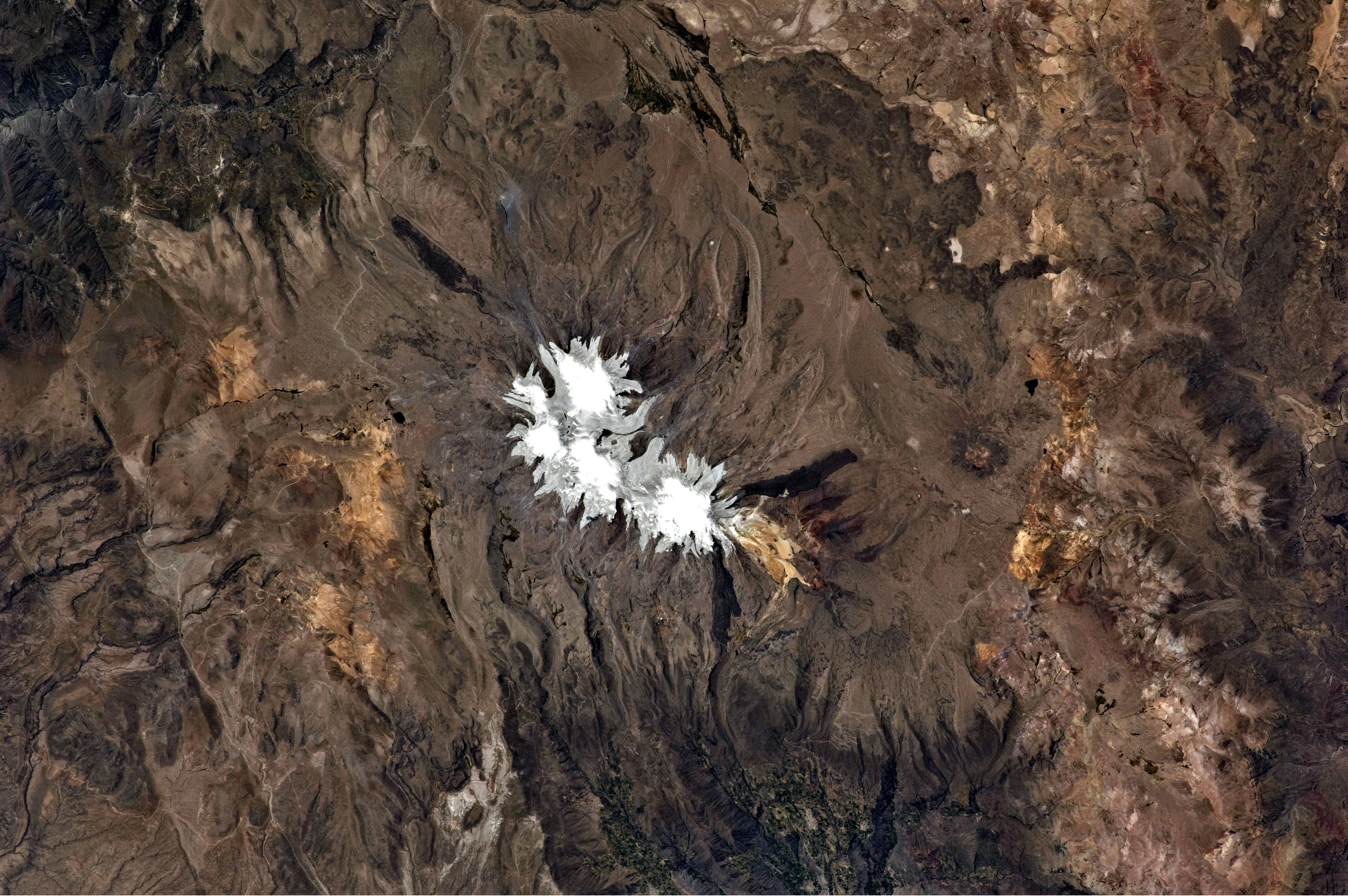
- Coropuna (snow-covered) and Hatun K'irawniyuq (upper center, to the left) as seen from the air

Highest point
- Elevation: 4,731.1 m (15,522 ft)
- Coordinates: 15°26′36″S 72°42′26″W

Geography
- Location within Peru
- Location: Peru, Arequipa Region, Condesuyos Province, La Unión Province
- Parent range: Andes

Hatun K'irawniyuq (Quechua hatun big, k'iraw cradle, bed of a child, -ni, -yuq suffixes, "the one with a big cradle" or "the big one with a cradle", Hispanicized spelling Jatun Quirauniyoc) is a mountain in the Arequipa Region in the Andes of Peru, about 4,731.1 metres (15,522 ft) high. It is situated in the Condesuyos Province, Salamanca District, north of the volcano Coropuna. The peak west of K'irawniyuq is named Quri Qhawana (Ccorecahuana). One of the nearest populated places is Mawk'allaqta (Quechua for "old town", Maucallacta) in the northeast. The village is situated at the mountain Mawk'a Llaqta (Mauca Llacta).
