= Iray =

Iray may refer to:

- Nvidia Iray, a 3D rendering engine from Mental Images
- Iray District, a district in Condesuyos Province, Peru
