= Q'illuqucha =

Q'illuqucha (Quechua: q'illu yellow, qucha lake, "yellow lake", also spelled Kellococha, Kelloccocha, Qellococha, Qelloqocha, Q'elloqocha, Quelloccocha, Quellococha, Quillococha) may refer to:

- Q'illuqucha (Arequipa), a mountain in the Arequipa Region, Peru
- Q'illuqucha (Cusco), a lake in the Cusco Region, Peru
- Q'illuqucha (Huancavelica), a mountain in the Huancavelica Region, Peru
