= Kuntur Sayana (Arequipa) =

Mountain in Peru

- Location within Peru

Highest point
- Elevation: 5,000 m (16,000 ft)
- Coordinates: 15°15′5″S 72°43′36″W

Geography
- Location: Peru, Arequipa Region, Condesuyos Province, La Unión Province
- Parent range: Andes

Kuntur Sayana (Quechua kuntur condor, sayana stop, whereabouts, a place where you stop frequently, "condor stop", Hispanicized spelling Condor Sayana) is a mountain in the Arequipa Region in the Andes of Peru, about 5,000 metres (16,404 ft) high. It is situated in the La Unión Province, Tomepampa District, and in the Condesuyos Province, Salamanca District, west of the mountains Phirura (Firura) and Sunqu Urqu and east of the mountain Saraqutu.
