= Sunqu Urqu =

Mountain in Peru

- Location within Peru

Highest point
- Elevation: 5,191.4 m (17,032 ft)
- Coordinates: 15°14′35″S 72°41′38″W

Geography
- Location: Peru, Arequipa Region, Condesuyos Province, La Unión Province
- Parent range: Andes

Sunqu Urqu (Quechua sunqu heart, urqu mountain, "heart mountain", Hispanicized spelling Soncco Orcco) is a mountain in the Arequipa Region in the Andes of Peru, about 5,191.4 metres (17,032 ft) high. It is situated in the La Unión Province, in the districts Alca and Tomepampa, and in the Condesuyos Province, Salamanca District, east of the mountains Saraqutu and Kuntur Sayana and west of the mountain Phirura (Firura).
