= Aljajahua =

Mountain in Peru

- Location within Peru

Highest point
- Elevation: 4,800 m (15,700 ft)
- Coordinates: 15°01′51″S 72°23′22″W

Geography
- Location: Peru, Arequipa Region
- Parent range: Andes, Huanzo

Aljajahua (possibly from Aymara allqa multicolored, q'awa little river, ditch, crevice, fissure, gap in the earth, "multicolored brook (or ravine)") is a mountain in the Huanzo mountain range in the Andes of Peru, about 4,800 metres (15,748 ft) high. It is situated in the Arequipa Region, Condesuyos Province, Cayarani District. Aljajahua lies between the Pumaranra valley in the east and the Huañajahua valley ("dry brook") in the west.
