= Chichas District =

Coordinates: 15.5500°S 73.0304°W

Chichas
- District
- Interactive map of Chichas
- Country: Peru
- Region: Arequipa
- Province: Condesuyos
- Founded: January 2, 1857
- Capital: Chichas

Government
  - Mayor: Tomas Wuile Ayñayanque Rosas

Area
  - Total: 392.16 km^{2} (151.41 sq mi)
- Elevation: 2,120 m (6,960 ft)

Population (2005 census)
  - Total: 904
  - Density: 2.31/km^{2} (5.97/sq mi)
- Time zone: UTC-5 (PET)
- UBIGEO: 040604

Chichas District is one of eight districts of the province Condesuyos in Peru.

== Places of interest ==
- Solimana
