= Yuraq Urqu (Arequipa) =

Mountain in Peru

- Location within Peru

Highest point
- Elevation: 4,985 m (16,355 ft)
- Coordinates: 15°12′16″S 72°32′31″W

Geography
- Location: Peru, Arequipa Region, Condesuyos Province, La Unión Province
- Parent range: Andes

Yuraq Urqu (Quechua yuraq white, urqu mountain, "white mountain", also spelled Yuraccorcco) is a 4,985-metre-high (16,355 ft) mountain in the Andes of Peru. It is situated in the Arequipa Region, Condesuyos Province, Salamanca District, and in the La Unión Province, Puyca District. Yuraq Urqu lies northeast of a lake named Tintarqucha (Tintarcocha).
