= Pallarcocha =

Lake in Peru

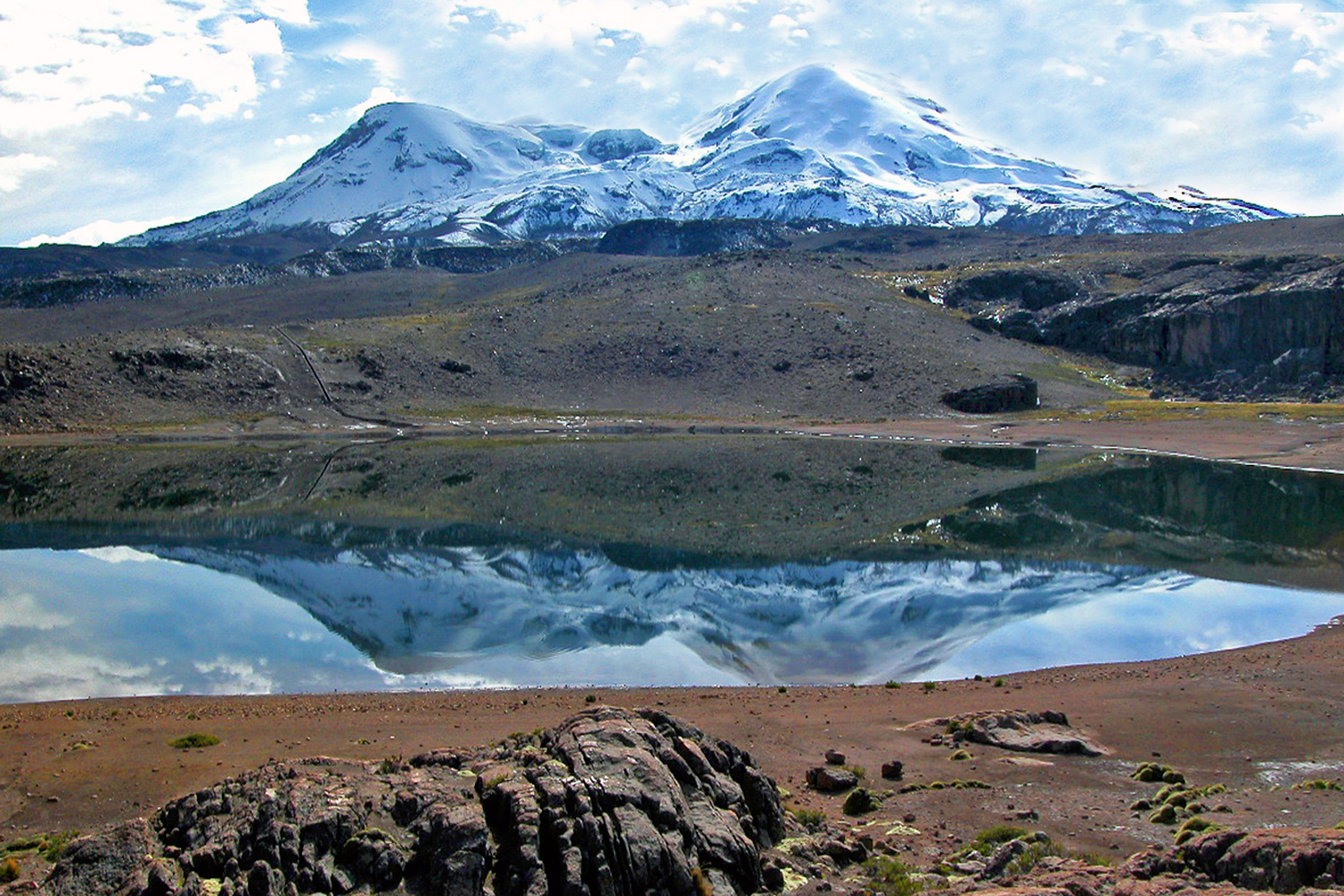
- Pallarcocha with Coropuna in the background

- Location within Peru
- Location: Peru; Arequipa Region
- Coordinates: 15°34′34″S 72°43′20″W
- Surface elevation: 4,740 m (15,550 ft)

Pallarcocha or Pallacocha (possibly from Quechua palla, dame, lady, mature woman of the Inca nobility, and qucha, lake,) is a small lake in Peru located in the Arequipa Region, Condesuyos Province, Salamanca District. It is situated at a height of about 4,740 metres (15,550 ft), west of the Coropuna volcano.
