= Pukara (Condesuyos) =

Mountain in Peru

- Location within Peru

Highest point
- Elevation: 5,000 m (16,000 ft)
- Coordinates: 14°57′30″S 72°18′14″W

Geography
- Location: Peru, Arequipa Region, Condesuyos Province
- Parent range: Andes, Wansu

Pukara (Aymara and Quechua for fortress, Hispanicized spelling Pucara) is a mountain in the Wansu mountain range in the Andes of Peru, about 5,000 metres (16,404 ft) high. It is situated in the Arequipa Region, Condesuyos Province, Cayarani District. Pukara lies southeast of Yana Yana.
