= Waraqu =

Mountain in Peru

- Location within Peru

Highest point
- Elevation: 5,005 m (16,421 ft)
- Coordinates: 15°09′58″S 72°29′48″W

Geography
- Location: Peru, Arequipa Region
- Parent range: Andes

Waraqu (Aymara and Quechua for cactus, Hispanicized spelling Huaraco) is a 5,005-metre-high (16,421 ft) mountain in the Andes of Peru. It is located in the Arequipa Region, Condesuyos Province, Cayarani District, and in the La Unión Province, Puyca District.
