= Río Grande District, Condesuyos =

Coordinates: 15.9579°S 73.1464°W

Río Grande District Hatun Mayu
- District
- Interactive map of Río Grande District
- Country: Peru
- Region: Arequipa
- Province: Condesuyos
- Founded: April 23, 1965
- Capital: Iquipi

Government
  - Mayor: Luis Aldrin Cardenas Carpio

Area
  - Total: 527.48 km^{2} (203.66 sq mi)
- Elevation: 505 m (1,657 ft)

Population (2005 census)
  - Total: 3,885
  - Density: 7.365/km^{2} (19.08/sq mi)
- Time zone: UTC-5 (PET)
- UBIGEO: 040606

Río Grande District is one of eight districts of the province Condesuyos in Peru.
