= Puma Ranra (Condesuyos) =

Mountain in Peru

- Location within Peru

Highest point
- Elevation: 4,800 m (15,700 ft)
- Coordinates: 15°00′20″S 72°22′35″W

Geography
- Location: Peru, Arequipa Region, Condesuyos Province
- Parent range: Andes, Wansu

Puma Ranra (Quechua puma cougar, puma, ranra stony place) erroneously also spelled Pumrangra) is a mountain in the Wansu mountain range in the Andes of Peru, about 4,800 metres (15,748 ft) high. It is situated in the Arequipa Region, Condesuyos Province, Cayarani District. Puma Ranra lies south of Janq'u Q'awa and Saxa Q'awa at the Puma Ranra valley (Pumaranra) in the west.
