= Uma Qala =

Mountain in Peru

- Location within Peru

Highest point
- Elevation: 4,853 m (15,922 ft)
- Coordinates: 15°12′33″S 72°28′46″W

Geography
- Location: Peru, Arequipa Region, Condesuyos Province
- Parent range: Andes

Uma Qala (Aymara uma water, qala stone, "water stone", also spelled Umajala) is a 4,853-metre-high (15,922 ft) mountain in the Andes of Peru. It is situated in the Arequipa Region, Condesuyos Province, Cayarani District. Uma Qala lies east of the mountain named Inka Misa. Inka Misa is also the name of the little lake at the feet of Uma Qala.
