= Saraqutu =

Mountain in Peru

- Location within Peru

Highest point
- Elevation: 5,200 m (17,100 ft)
- Coordinates: 15°15′17″S 72°47′13″W

Geography
- Location: Peru, Arequipa Region, Condesuyos Province, La Unión Province
- Parent range: Andes

Saraqutu (Quechua sara maize, qutu heap, "maize heap", Hispanicized spelling Saraccoto) is a mountain in the Arequipa Region in the Andes of Peru, about 5,200 metres (17,060 ft) high. It is situated in the La Unión Province, in the districts Cotahuasi and Tomepampa, and in the Condesuyos Province, Salamanca District. Saraqutu lies west of the mountains Sunqu Urqu and Kuntur Sayana.
