= Alca District =

Coordinates: 15.1471°S 72.7811°W

Alca
- District
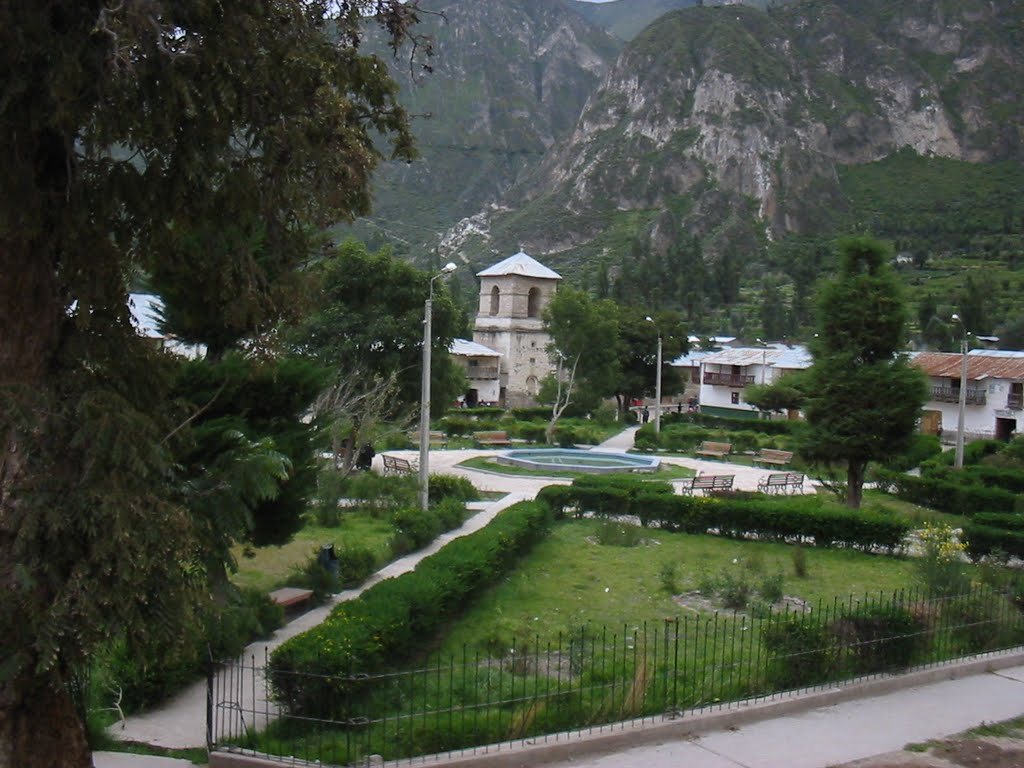
- Main square of Alca
- Interactive map of Alca
- Country: Peru
- Region: Arequipa
- Province: La Unión
- Founded: May 4, 1835
- Capital: Alca

Government
  - Mayor: Benjamin Barrios Bellido

Area
  - Total: 193.42 km^{2} (74.68 sq mi)
- Elevation: 2,750 m (9,020 ft)

Population (2005 census)
  - Total: 2,263
  - Density: 11.70/km^{2} (30.30/sq mi)
- Time zone: UTC-5 (PET)
- UBIGEO: 040802

Alca District is one of eleven districts of the province La Unión in Peru.

== Ethnic groups ==
The people in the district are mainly indigenous citizens of Quechua descent. Quechua is the language which the majority of the population (78.33%) learnt to speak in childhood, 20.69% of the residents started speaking using the Spanish language (2007 Peru Census).

== See also ==
- Sunqu Urqu
