= Condesuyos province =

Coordinates: 15.839264°S 72.651358°W

Condesuyos
- Province
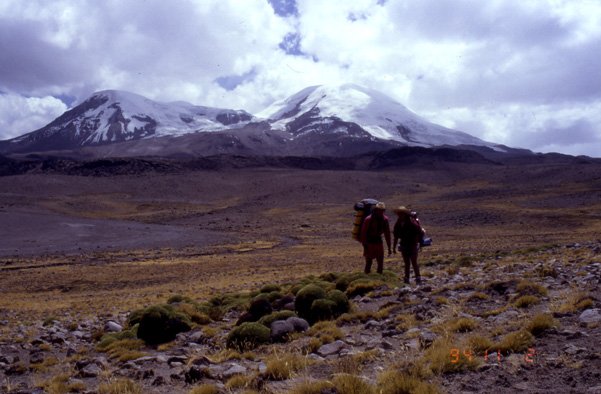
- Qurupuna volcano, Condesuyos Province

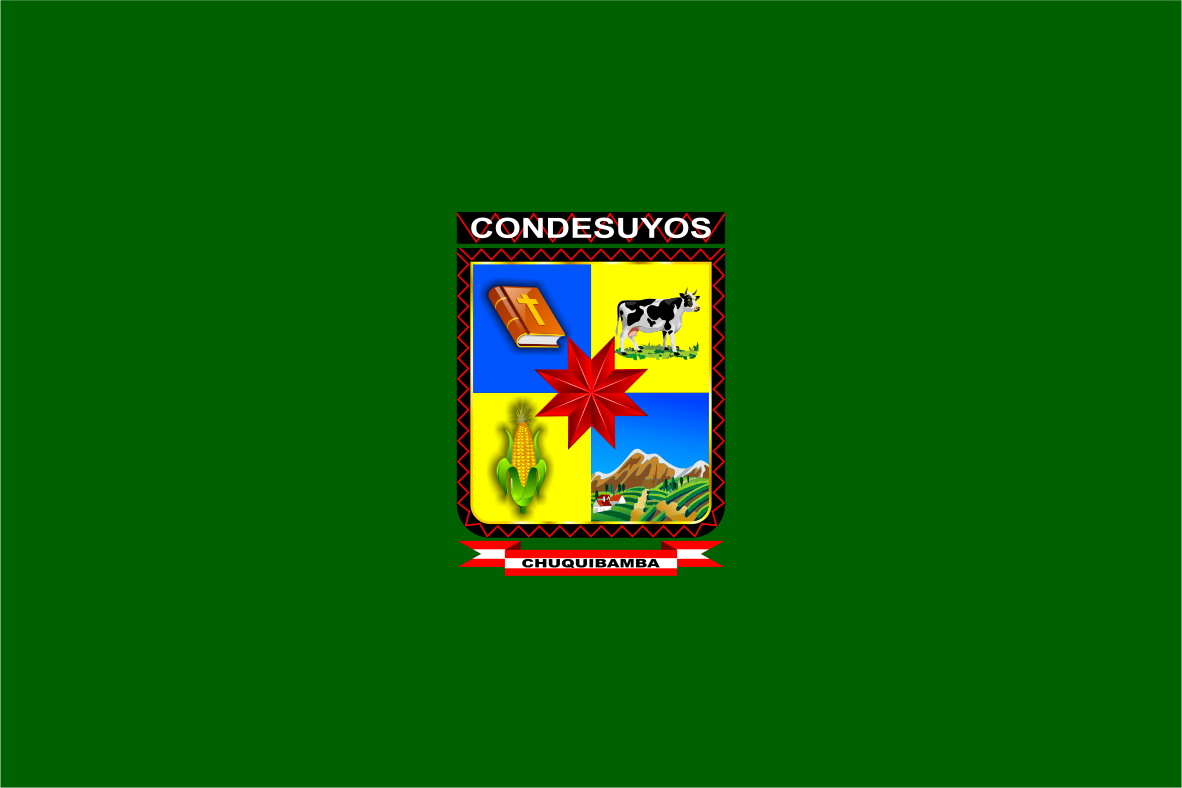
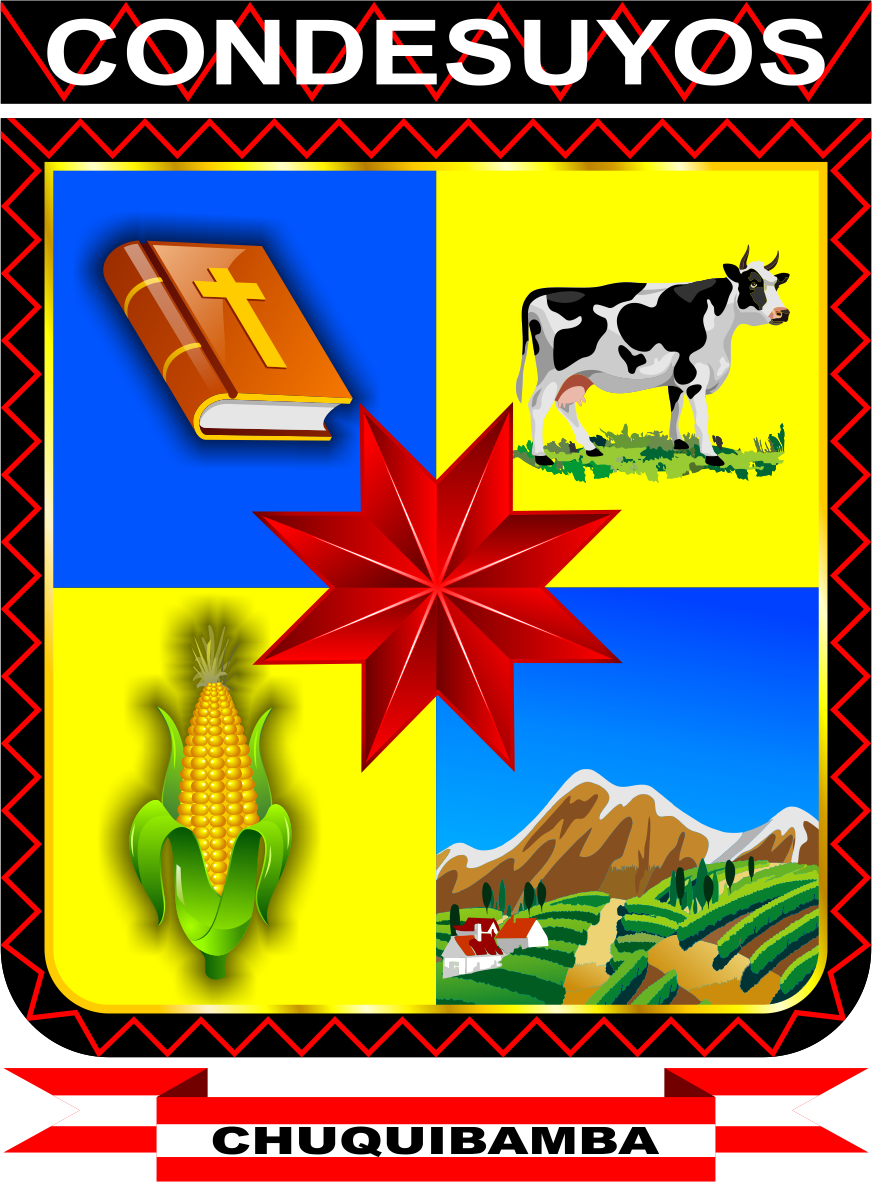
- Flag Coat of arms

- Location of Condesuyos in the Arequipa Region
- Country: Peru
- Region: Arequipa
- Capital: Chuquibamba

Government
  - Mayor: Miguel Angel Manchego Llerena (2007)

Area
  - Total: 6,958.4 km^{2} (2,686.7 sq mi)

Population
  - Total: 18,963
  - Density: 2.7252/km^{2} (7.0582/sq mi)
- UBIGEO: 0406

Condesuyos is one of eight provinces in the Arequipa Region of Peru. Its seat is Chuquibamba.

== Geography ==
The Andean Volcanic Belt and the Wansu mountain range traverse the province. Some of the highest peaks of the province are listed below:

- Allqa Q'awa
- Anka Phawa
- Anta Puna
- Chuqllu Chuqllu
- Hatun K'irawniyuq
- Hatun Q'asa
- Inka Misa
- Janq'u Q'awa
- Kuntur Pillu
- Kuntur Salla
- Kuntur Sayana
- Kunturi
- Misani
- Misawana Mawras
- Ñawicha
- Puka Qaqa
- Pukara (Condesuyos)
- Pukara (Salamanca)
- Pukyu Uma
- Puma Wasi
- Puma Ranra (Castilla-Cond.)
- Puma Ranra (Cond.)
- Qillqata
- Qucha Q'asa
- Quyllur Umasqa
- Q'illuqucha
- Rinri Q'asa
- Qurupuna
- Saraqutu
- Saxa Q'awa
- Sulimana
- Sunqu Urqu
- Tanka
- Tirani
- T'allani Urqu
- Uma Qala
- Waraqu
- Waych'awi
- Waych'a Waqi
- Yana Qaqa
- Yana Yana
- Yana Urqu
- Yaritayuq Apachita
- Yuraq Q'asa
- Yuraq Urqu

== Political division ==
The province is divided into eight districts which are:

- Andaray (Andaray)
- Cayarani (Cayarani)
- Chichas (Chichas)
- Chuquibamba (Chuquibamba)
- Iray (Iray)
- Río Grande (Iquipi)
- Salamanca (Salamanca)
- Yanaquihua (Yanaquihua)

== Ethnic groups ==
The province is inhabited by indigenous citizens of Quechua descent. Spanish, however, is the language which the majority of the population (73.02%) learnt to speak in childhood, 26.37% of the residents started speaking using the Quechua language (2007 Peru Census).

== See also ==
- Pallaqucha
