= Tomepampa District =

Coordinates: 15.1742°S 72.8341°W

Tomepampa Tumipampa
- District
- Interactive map of Tomepampa
- Country: Peru
- Region: Arequipa
- Province: La Unión
- Founded: May 4, 1835
- Capital: Tomepampa

Government
  - Mayor: Francisco Paul Hinojosa Solis

Area
  - Total: 94.16 km^{2} (36.36 sq mi)
- Elevation: 2,590 m (8,500 ft)

Population (2005 census)
  - Total: 957
  - Density: 10.2/km^{2} (26.3/sq mi)
- Time zone: UTC-5 (PET)
- UBIGEO: 040810

Tomepampa District is one of eleven districts of the province La Unión in Peru.

== See also ==
- Kuntur Sayana
- Saraqutu
- Sunqu Urqu
