= Hatun Q'asa (Arequipa) =

Mountain in Peru

- Location within Peru

Highest point
- Elevation: 4,800 m (15,700 ft)
- Coordinates: 15°01′41″S 72°20′06″W

Geography
- Location: Peru, Arequipa Region, Condesuyos Province
- Parent range: Andes, Wansu

Hatun Q'asa (Quechua hatun big (jatun in Bolivia), q'asa mountain pass, "big mountain pass", hispanicized spelling Jatun Casa) is a mountain in the Wansu mountain range in the Andes of Peru, about 4,800 metres (15,748 ft) high. It is situated in the Arequipa Region, Condesuyos Province, Cayarani District. Hatun Q'asa lies at the Q'illumayu valley (Quechua for "yellow river", also spelled Quellomayo).
