= Toro District =

Coordinates: 15.2644°S 72.9258°W

Toro T'uru
- District
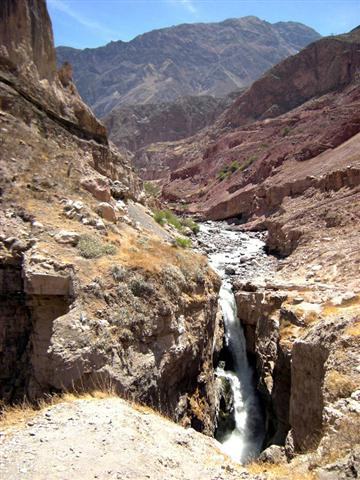
- Cascade of Sipia, Toro district
- Interactive map of Toro
- Country: Peru
- Region: Arequipa
- Province: La Unión
- Founded: May 4, 1835
- Capital: Toro

Government
  - Mayor: Francisco Elias Tapia Martinez

Area
  - Total: 391.44 km^{2} (151.14 sq mi)
- Elevation: 2,964 m (9,724 ft)

Population (2005 census)
  - Total: 1,205
  - Density: 3.078/km^{2} (7.973/sq mi)
- Time zone: UTC-5 (PET)
- UBIGEO: 040811

Toro District is one of eleven districts of the province La Unión in Peru.

== Geography ==
One of the highest peaks of the district is Sulimana at 6,093 m (19,990 ft). Other mountains are listed below:

- Hatun Ikma
- Hatun Yaritayuq
- Huch'uy Ikma
- Huch'uy Yaritayuq
- Kimsa Urqu
- Kuntur Sinqa
- Puka Puka
- Puka Urqu
- Qaqa Wachu
- Q'illu Q'illu
- Yana Qaqa
- Yana Ranra

== Economic activity ==
- Crop production
- Construction
- Cattle Keeping

== Livestock ==
- Cattle
- Goat
- Chicken

== See also ==
- Tooro Kingdom
- Districts of Uganda
