= Chuquibamba =

Chuquibamba Chuqipampa
- Town
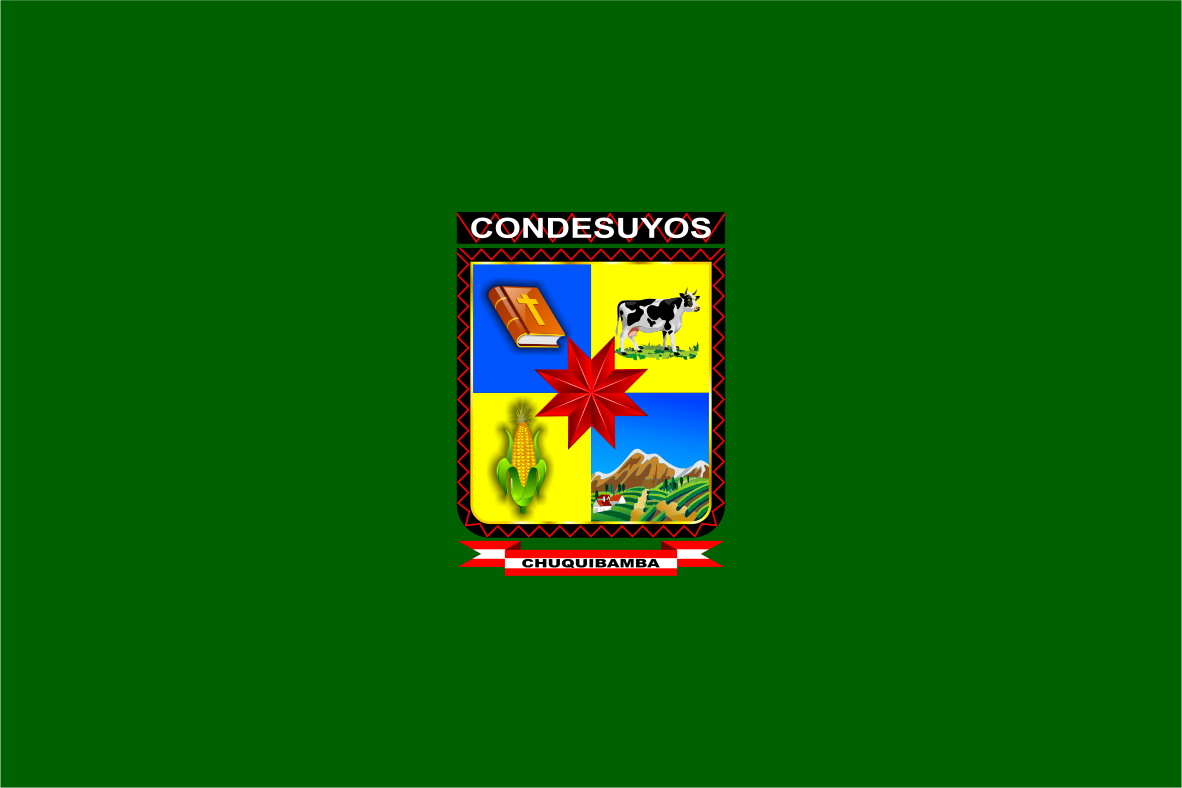
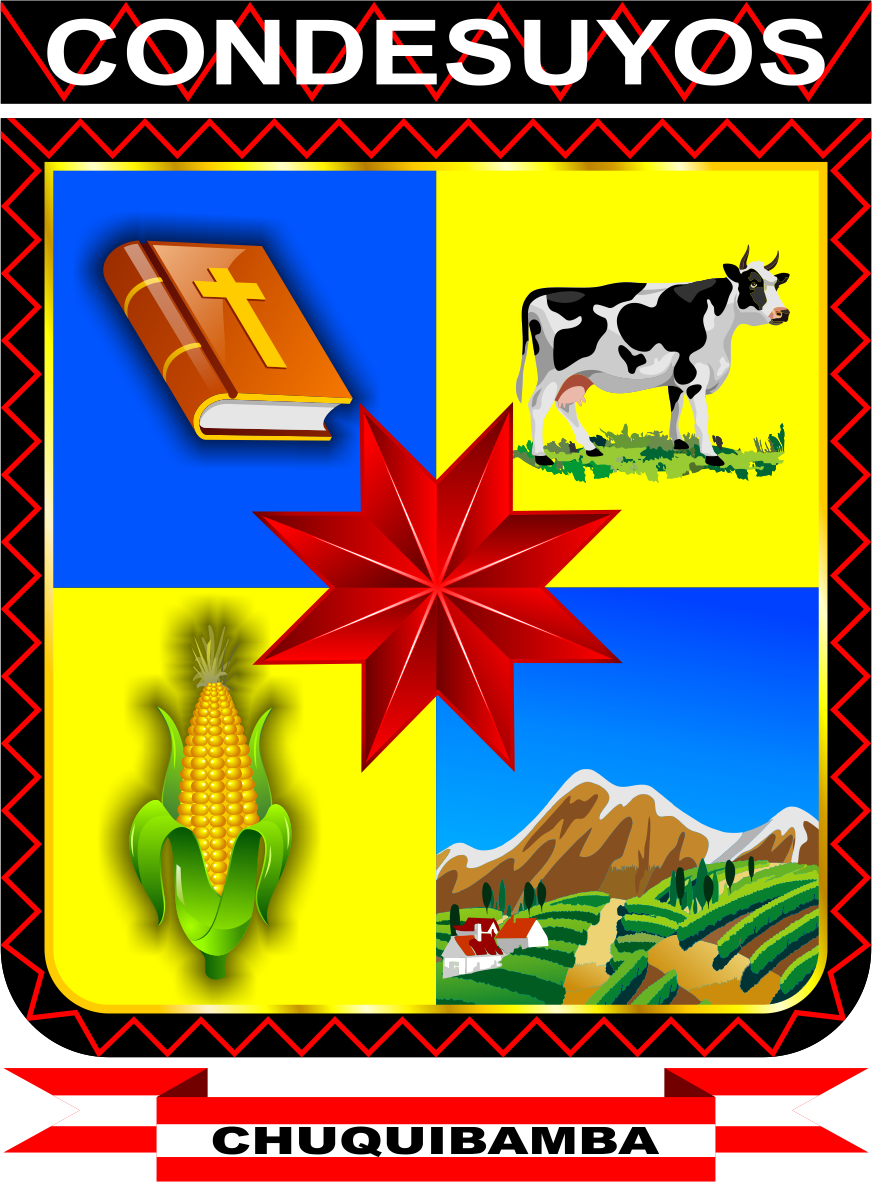
- Flag Coat of arms

- Location within Peru
- Coordinates: 15°50′21.35″S 72°39′04.89″W
- Country: Peru
- Region: Arequipa
- Province: Condesuyos
- District: Chuquibamba

Government
  - Mayor: Miguel Angel Manchego Llerena
- Elevation: 2,945 m (9,662 ft)
- Time zone: UTC-5 (PET)

Chuquibamba (Quechua: Chuqipampa, chuqi means "ore" and pampa means "plain") is a town in southern Peru, capital of the province Condesuyos in the region Arequipa. It is the seat of the Territorial Prelature of Chuquibamba.

The population of Chuquibamba is 3,066 according to the 2005 census. It is the location of the high school Colegio Nacional San Luis Gonzaga which is over 100 years old.

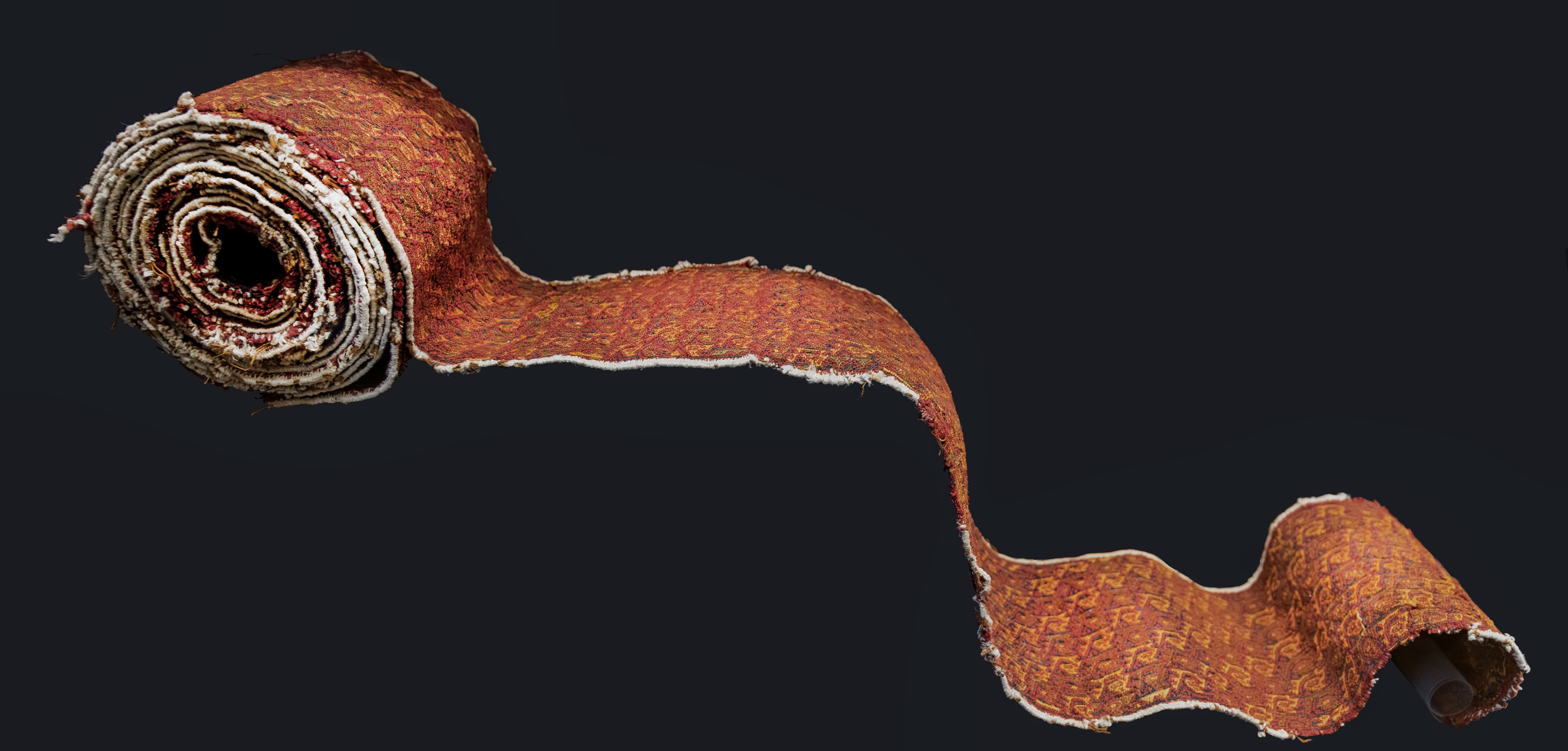
Men's belt from the Chuquibamba culture - Musée des Amériques - Auch
