= Iray District =

Coordinates: 15.8966°S 72.5770°W

Iray
- District
- Interactive map of Iray
- Country: Peru
- Region: Arequipa
- Province: Condesuyos
- Founded: November 26, 1917
- Capital: Iray

Government
  - Mayor: Yurgen Oscar Bernal Medina

Area
  - Total: 247.62 km^{2} (95.61 sq mi)
- Elevation: 2,400 m (7,900 ft)

Population (2005 census)
  - Total: 812
  - Density: 3.28/km^{2} (8.49/sq mi)
- Time zone: UTC-5 (PET)
- UBIGEO: 040605

Iray District is one of eight districts of the province Condesuyos in Peru.
