= Salamanca District =

Coordinates: 15.5061°S 72.8380°W

Salamanca Salamanka
- District
- Interactive map of Salamanca
- Country: Peru
- Region: Arequipa
- Province: Condesuyos
- Founded: January 2, 1857
- Capital: Salamanka

Government
  - Mayor: Anastacio Felix Huisacayna Soria

Area
  - Total: 1,235.8 km^{2} (477.1 sq mi)
- Elevation: 3,203 m (10,509 ft)

Population (2005 census)
  - Total: 1,257
  - Density: 1.017/km^{2} (2.634/sq mi)
- Time zone: UTC-5 (PET)
- UBIGEO: 040607

Salamanca District is one of eight districts of the province Condesuyos in Peru.

== Geography ==
Some of the highest mountains of the district are listed below:

- Anta Puna
- Chuñu Pirwa
- Hatun K'irawniyuq
- Iruyuq
- Kuntur Sayana
- Kuntur Sinqa
- Llulluch'ani
- Mama Wasi
- Mawk'a Llaqta
- Pallqa
- Pariwana
- Pukara
- Pukyu Uma
- Puma Wasi
- Puma Ranra
- Qiñwa Ranra
- Quri Qhawana
- Quyllur Umasqa
- Qhawana
- Rayusqa
- Rinri Q'asa
- Saraqutu
- Saywa Ranra
- Saywa Urqu
- Sulimana
- Suni
- Sunqu Urqu
- Sura Pata
- Tirani
- Waycha Waqi
- Wayllachani
- Wayna Warqu
- Yana Qucha
- Yana Saywa
- Yana Urqu
- Yaritayuq Apachita
- Yuraq Q'asa
- Yuraq Urqu
