= Kuntur Salla =

Mountain in Peru

- Location within Peru

Highest point
- Elevation: 5,003 m (16,414 ft)
- Coordinates: 14°47′30″S 71°57′14″W

Geography
- Location: Peru, Arequipa Region
- Parent range: Andes

Kuntur Salla (Quechua kuntur condor, salla large cliff of gravel, "condor cliff", Hispanicized spelling Condorsalla) is a 5,003-metre-high (16,414 ft) mountain in the Andes of Peru. It is located in the Arequipa Region, Condesuyos Province, Cayarani District.
