= Quello Cocha (Arequipa) =

Mountain in Peru

- Location within Peru

Highest point
- Elevation: 4,800 m (15,700 ft)
- Coordinates: 15°13′22″S 72°30′17″W

Geography
- Location: Peru, Arequipa Region, Condesuyos Province
- Parent range: Andes

Quello Cocha (possibly from in the Quechua spelling Q'illuqucha or Q'illu Qucha; q'illu yellow, qucha lake, "yellow lake") is a mountain in the Andes of Peru, about 4,800 m (15,748 ft) high. It is located in the Arequipa Region, Condesuyos Province, Cayarani District. Quello Cocha lies east of a lake named Tintarcocha (Tintarqucha).

== Geography ==
Quello Cocha is located in the Andes Mountains, within the Arequipa Region of southern Peru. It is surrounded by high-altitude terrain and indigenous flora, typical of the Andean ecosystem.

== See also ==
- List of lakes in Peru
