= Saxa Q'awa =

Mountain in Peru

- Location within Peru

Highest point
- Elevation: 5,000 m (16,000 ft)
- Coordinates: 14°58′42″S 72°22′19″W

Geography
- Location: Peru, Arequipa Region, Condesuyos Province, La Unión Province
- Parent range: Andes, Wansu

Saxa Q'awa (Aymara saxa hollow, q'awa little river, ditch, crevice, fissure, gap in the earth, "hollow brook", hispanicized spelling Sacsajahua) is a mountain in the Wansu mountain range in the Andes of Peru, about 5,000 metres (16,404 ft) high. It is situated in the Arequipa Region, Condesuyos Province, Cayarani District. Saxa Q'awa lies south of Janq'u Q'awa between the Puma Ranra valley in the west and a lake name Anqasqucha (Quechua for "blue lake") in the east.
