= Chuquibamba District, Condesuyos =

Coordinates: 15.8479°S 72.9377°W

Chuquibamba Chuqipampa
- District
- Interactive map of Chuquibamba
- Country: Peru
- Region: Arequipa
- Province: Condesuyos
- Capital: Chuquibamba

Government
  - Mayor: Miguel Angel Manchego Llerena

Area
  - Total: 1,255.04 km^{2} (484.57 sq mi)
- Elevation: 2,945 m (9,662 ft)

Population (2005 census)
  - Total: 4,123
  - Density: 3.285/km^{2} (8.509/sq mi)
- Time zone: UTC-5 (PET)
- UBIGEO: 040601

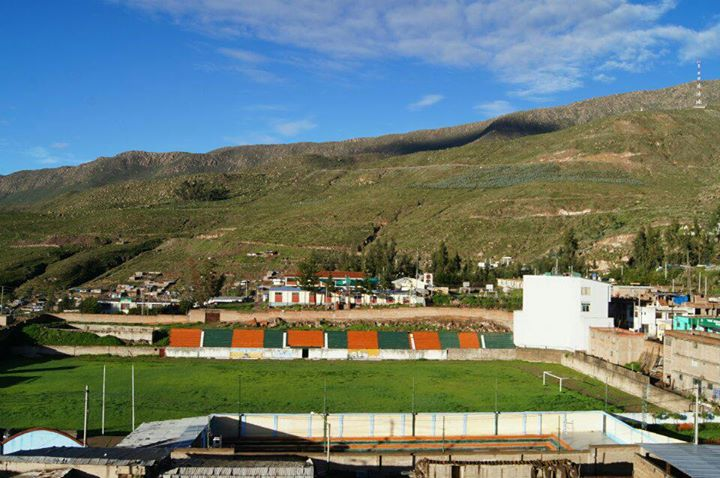
View of Los Estudiantes Stadium, Chuquibamba.

Chuquibamba District is one of eight districts of the province Condesuyos in Peru.

== See also ==
- Ñawicha
