= Firura =

Mountain in Peru

- Location within Peru

Highest point
- Elevation: 5,498 m (18,038 ft)
- Coordinates: 15°14′S 72°48′W

Geography
- Location: Arequipa Region, Peru
- Parent range: Andean Volcanic Belt, Andes

Firura is an extinct volcano of the Central Andean Volcanic Belt, located in the Arequipa Region of southern Peru. Together with Sara Sara, Solimana and Coropuna it forms one of the Central Andean volcanoes. It is in the Andes, north of the Pucuncho Basin.

== Description ==
Two domes form the Firura volcano, which has a low relief of 500 metres (1,600 ft) and grew on top of older ignimbrites. Lava flows and stratovolcanoes form a 10–12 kilometres (6.2–7.5 mi) long field. Aside from the main summit Firura, there also are Soncco Orcco (5,191 metres (17,031 ft)), Jahsaya (5,144 metres (16,877 ft)) and separating Firura from Solimana Antapuna (4,852 metres (15,919 ft)). The complex has generated basaltic or basaltic andesite lava flows that reach down into inhabited areas, as well as an ignimbrite resulting from the collapse of the ancient crater. A collapse of the crater was also responsible for the formation of a landslide dam in the Cotahuasi River valley. The date of the last volcanic activity is Pleistocene to Holocene, but it does not appear to be a significant hazard and is classified as a very low-risk volcano.

Much of the southern side of the volcano above 5,300 metres (17,400 ft) altitude is covered with perennial snow. A small glacier (>0.5 square kilometres (0.19 sq mi)) is found on the southern summit of Firura and reaches down to 5,255 metres (17,241 ft). This glacier appears to be located above the local equilibrium line altitude.

Firura has well preserved moraine systems. A major moraine system with a relief of 80–100 metres (260–330 ft) was left by the Last Glacial Maximum, although expansion of glaciers on the northern flank was constrained by a high plateau. The prevalent aridity of the climate impedes the degradation of these moraines.
