= Solimana (volcano) =

Mountain in Peru

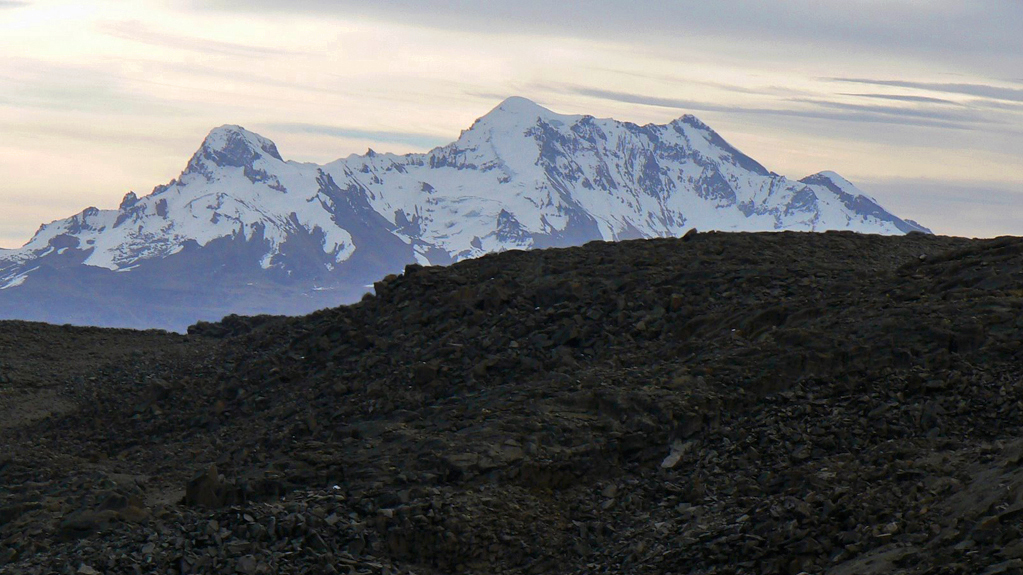

Highest point
- Elevation: 6,093 m (19,990 ft)
- Prominence: 1,461 m (4,793 ft)
- Parent peak: Coropuna
- Coordinates: 15°24′36″S 72°53′35″W

Geography
- Location within Peru
- Location: Arequipa Region
- Parent range: Andes

Geology
- Mountain type: Stratovolcano
- Last eruption: Pleistocene

Climbing
- First ascent: First ascent to the main summit (central peak), 6’093m.(19’990 ft), on 1st August 1970 by Mario Bignami (CAI) Italy, and Julian Blanco Herrera, Peru.

Solimana is a volcanic massif in the Andes of Peru, South America, that is approximately 6,093 metres (19,990 ft) high. (Note: Other data from available digital elevation models: SRTM yields 6,020 metres (19,750 ft), ASTER 6,010 metres (19,720 ft) and TanDEM-X 6,015 metres (19,734 ft). The nearest key col reaches an elevation of 4,632 metres (15,197 ft) and the volcano has a topographic prominence of 1,461 metres (4,793 ft) with a dominance of 23.98%. Its parent peak is Coropuna and the Topographic isolation is 29.1 kilometres (18.1 mi).) It is considered an extinct stratovolcano that is part of the Central Volcanic Zone, one of the volcanic belts of the Andes. It features a caldera as well as traces of a sector collapse and subsequent erosion. The volcano is glaciated.

== Geomorphology and geography ==
=== Regional ===
It is situated in the Arequipa Region, Condesuyos Province, in the districts of Chichas and Salamanca, and in the La Unión Province, in the districts of Cotahuasi and Toro. Several towns lie around the volcano.

Solimana is part of the Peruvian segment of the Central Volcanic Zone of the Andes. The Central Volcanic Zone in this segment has both generated large composite volcanoes which rise 2–3 kilometres (1.2–1.9 mi) above their basement and monogenetic volcanoes and volcanic fields. This zone of volcanoes includes, from northwest to southeast, Sara Sara, Solimana, Coropuna, Andagua volcanic field, Huambo volcanic field, Ampato, Sabancaya, Cerro Nicholson, Chachani, Misti, Ubinas, Huaynaputina, Ticsani, and Tutupaca, some of which have been active during historical time.

=== Local ===
Solimana rises above an approximately 4-kilometre (2.5 mi) high basement. It has a caldera, which gives it an asymmetric appearance; further on the south flank both the basement and inner parts of the edifice crop out. This asymmetry was caused by large sector collapses and subsequent erosion of the southern flank. The main edifice is formed by a compound volcano accompanied by lava domes and lava flows as well as pyroclastic flows and lahars, the latter relating to the formation of the collapse structure.

Solimana has a high relief reaching approximately 2,000 metres (6,600 ft), the consequence of glacial erosion. Neighbouring canyons have begun to incise the edifice. The Cotahuasi Canyon runs north of Solimana, and the southern flank is drained by numerous quebradas.

During the Last Glacial Maximum a number of glaciers developed on Solimana, the longest of which occupied the Quebrada Caño on the northern flank and reached 9 kilometres (5.6 mi) length. There have been approximately five episodes of glaciation on Solimana in total. Later glaciations after the Last Glacial maximum emplaced conspicuous moraines, which are well preserved by the arid climate. Presently, glaciers are restricted to a valley on the northern slope and the steep southeastern flank; a report in 1992 indicated the presence of an ice cap covering a surface of 50 square kilometres (19 sq mi). In addition, rock glaciers are present on Solimana.

== Geology ==
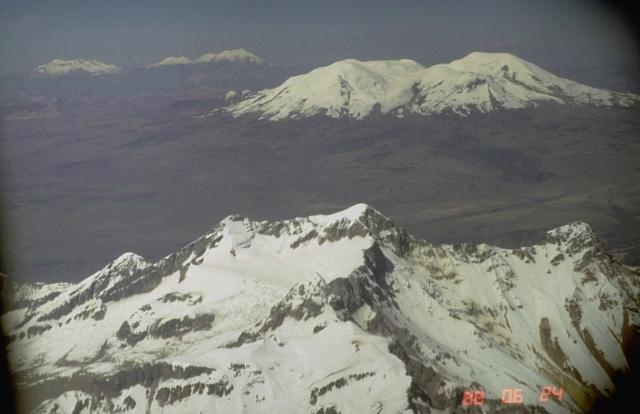
Aerial photo of Solimana (foreground), Coropuna (upper right) and Sabancaya (upper left)

The Nazca Plate subducts beneath the South America Plate at a rate of 61 ± 3 millimetres per year (2.40 ± 0.12 in/year); it has slowed since the Oligocene. This subduction process is responsible for the formation of the Andes mountains in the region.

Together with Sara Sara and Coropuna, Solimana is located on the northwestern end of the Central Volcanic Zone; no volcanism occurs farther north where the Nazca Plate subducts at a shallower angle than beneath the Central Volcanic Zone. Of these volcanoes, Solimana is considered to be the oldest and Coropuna the youngest. Solimana together with Ampato and Coropuna form the Cordillera Ampato.

The basement dates back to the Precambrian-Paleozoic and is buried beneath several pre-Oligocene formations. The Tacaza formation forms a Miocene-Oligocene layer of volcanic and sedimentary rocks that are overlain by Quaternary volcanoes, which include the Barroso Group formation and the Pliocene Sencca formation.

=== Composition ===
Samples taken from Solimana are andesite and dacite, but more recently basaltic andesite was erupted as well. The rocks contain hornblende, hypersthene, and plagioclase, with additional olivine in the phreatomagmatic deposits.

The geochemistry of volcanoes of the Central Volcanic Zone typically displays strong evidence of crustal contamination, which is attributed to the thick crust that has developed in this region. A granulitic basement may be a plausible origin of this contamination, with additional contribution of subducted sediments.

== Vegetation ==
Llareta and ichu grass form the thin vegetation up to about 5,000 metres (16,000 ft) altitude.

== Archeology ==
The Inca considered Solimana and Coropuna to be sacred mountains, which were within the Inca Condesuyos province.

In 2008, an Inca archeological site was discovered on Solimana's eastern flank, in the locality of Minticocha. The site most likely served religious and ceremonial purposes. According to colonial period sources, Solimana is the site of a major oracle, but this oracle is more likely to be located at Muyu Muyu close to the town of Yanque than at Minticocha.

== First ascent ==
First ascent to the main summit (central peak), 6’093m.(19’990 ft), on 1st August 1970 by Mario Bignami (CAI) Italy, and Julian Blanco Herrera, Peru. Note: In 1952, Mathias Rebitsch, Piero Ghiglione, Anders Bolinder and Alberto Parodi climbed the North peak, the second highest peak.

== Eruption history ==
Solimana is an extinct volcano. It was active during the Miocene and Pliocene between 4 and 1.5 million years ago, with the last eruption occurring between 500,000 and 300,000 years ago. The collapses occurred at some time between 3.05 and 1.5 million years ago and after the collapse volcanism became centered inside the collapse scar and its margins, with the youngest activity forming phreatomagmatic deposits within the caldera and a scoria cone on its south.

Solimana may be the source of the Lomas pyroclastic flow deposit and the Upper Sencca ignimbrite. The Upper Sencca ignimbrite was erupted between 1.76 and 2.09 million years ago and filled several valleys with 13–32 cubic kilometres (3.1–7.7 cu mi) of material, while the Lomas deposit was erupted between 1.56 and 1.26 million years ago. Solimana still features fumarolic activity within the caldera and the Peruvian geophysical institute has installed a geodesic control point on the volcano. It is considered a moderately dangerous volcano.
