= Chuqllu Chuqllu =

Mountain in Peru

- Chhuxllu Chhuxllu
- Location within Peru

Highest point
- Elevation: 5,000 m (16,000 ft)
- Coordinates: 14°49′36″S 72°13′42″W

Geography
- Location: Peru, Arequipa Region, Castilla Province
- Parent range: Andes, Wansu

Chuqllu Chuqllu or Chhuxllu Chhuxllu (Quechua chuqllu corncob, spelled chhuxllu in Aymara, the reduplication indicates that there is a group or a complex of something, "a group of corncobs", Hispanicized spelling Chocllochocllo) is a mountain in the Wansu mountain range in the Andes of Peru, about 5,000 metres (16,404 ft) high. It is situated in the Arequipa Region, Castilla Province, Orcopampa District.
