= Coropuna =

Volcano in Peru

- Nevado Coropuna
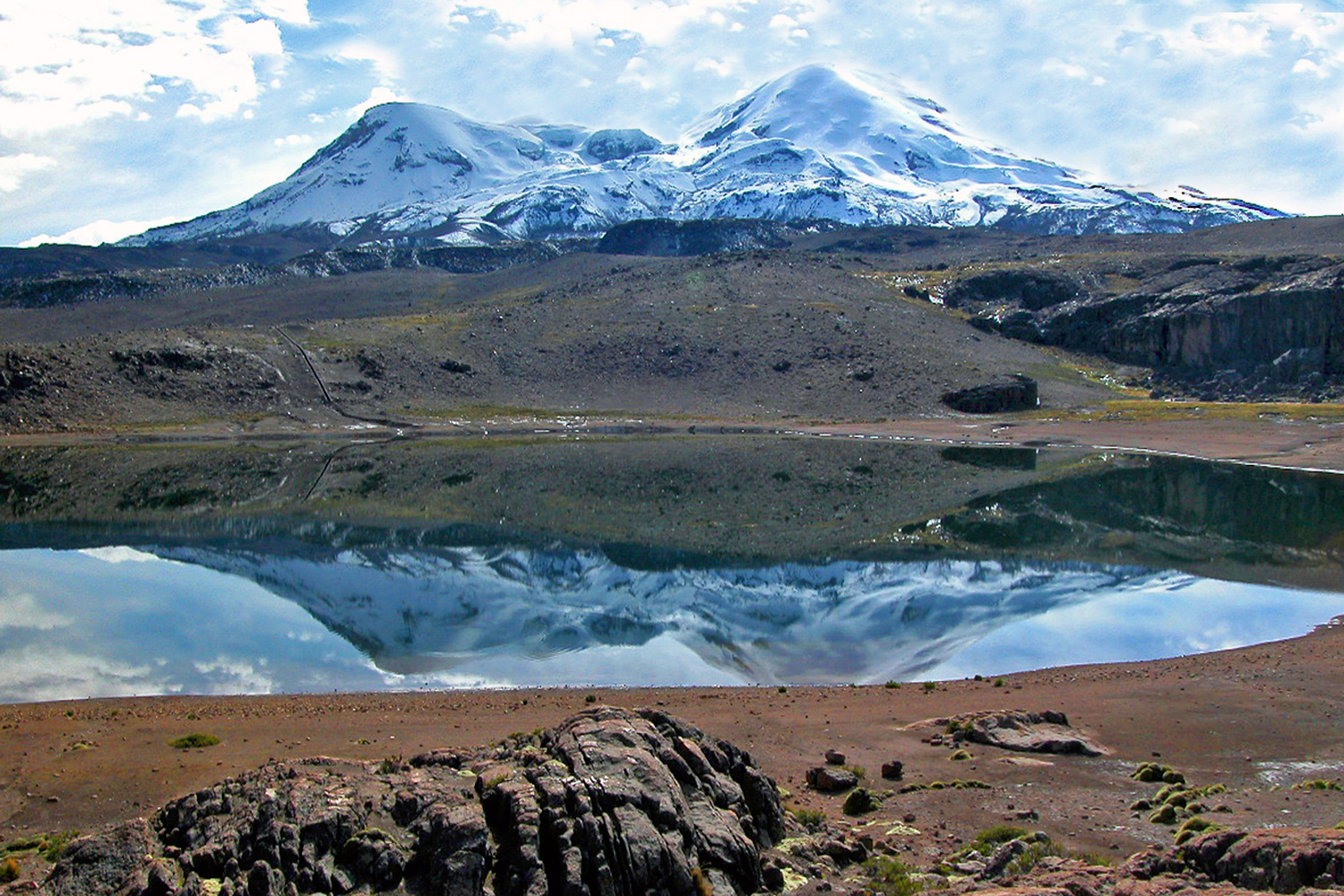

Highest point
- Elevation: 6,377 m (20,922 ft)
- Coordinates: 15°33′S 72°39′W

Naming
- Etymology: Etymology
- Native name: Qhuru Puna (Quechua)
- English translation: "Golden mountain", "cold, snowy" or "cut off at the top"

Geography
- Location within Peru
- Parent range: Cordillera Occidental, Peruvian Andes

Geology
- Rock ages: Early Pliocene – Holocene; c. 5 Ma – 1 ka
- Mountain type: Stratovolcano complex
- Rock type: Geology
- Volcanic belt: Andean Volcanic Belt
- Last eruption: 1,100 ± 100 or 700 ± 200 years ago

Climbing
- First ascent: possibly prehistoric

Coropuna is a dormant volcano located in the Andes mountains of southeast-central Peru. The upper reaches of the compound volcano consist of several perennially snowbound conical summits, lending it the name Nevado Coropuna in Spanish. The complex extends over an area of 240 square kilometres (93 sq mi) and its highest summit reaches an altitude of 6,377 metres (20,922 ft) above sea level. This makes the Coropuna complex the third-highest of Peru. Its thick ice cap is the most extensive in Earth's tropical zone, with several outlet glaciers stretching out to lower altitudes. Below an elevation of 5,000 metres (16,000 ft), there are various vegetation belts which include trees, peat bogs, grasses and also agricultural areas and pastures.

The Coropuna complex consists of several stratovolcanoes. These are composed chiefly of ignimbrites (Note: Ash flows) and lava flows on a basement formed by Middle Miocene ignimbrites and lava flows. The Coropuna complex has been active for at least five million years, with the bulk of the current cone having been formed during the Quaternary. (Note: The age of man, including Pleistocene and Holocene.) Coropuna has had two or three Holocene eruptions 2,100 ± 200 and either 1,100 ± 100 or 700 ± 200 years ago which generated lava flows, plus an additional eruption which may have taken place some 6,000 years ago. Current activity occurs exclusively in the form of hot springs.

Coropuna is located 150 kilometres (93 mi) northwest of the city of Arequipa. People have lived on the slopes of Coropuna for millennia. The mountain was regarded as sacred by the Inca, and several archaeological sites have been discovered there, including the Inca sites of Maucallacta and Acchaymarca. The mountain was considered one of the most important Inca religious sites in their realm; human sacrifices were performed on its slopes, Coropuna forms part of many local legends and the mountain is worshiped to the present day.

The ice cap of Coropuna, which during the Last Glacial Maximum (LGM) had expanded to over 500 km^{2} (190 sq mi), has been in retreat since at least 1850. Estimates published in 2018 imply that the ice cap will persist until about 2120. The retreat of the Coropuna glaciers threatens the water supply of tens of thousands of people relying upon its watershed, and interaction between volcanic activity and glacial effects has generated mudflows that could be hazardous to surrounding populations. Because of this, the Peruvian geological agency, INGEMMET, monitors Coropuna and has published a hazard map for the volcano.

== Name and etymology ==
In Quechua, puna means "plateau", and coro is a common component of toponyms such as with Coro Coro, Bolivia, its etymology is unclear but may relate to Puquina language coro "round" but may also refer to "world". The name may mean Qoripuna, "Puna of Gold", "golden mountain", "cold, snowy" or "cut off at the top". Ernst Wilhelm Middendorf believed it was originally the name of the high plateau around the mountain. The name is also spelled Qhuru Puna or Coropona. The mountain is also called Nevado Coropuna; "Nevado" is the Spanish word for "snowy". There is another volcano in the Andahua volcanic field which has the same name, but is completely separate.

== Geography and geomorphology ==
Coropuna lies in the Andes of Peru, on the border between the Castilla and Condesuyos Provinces of the Arequipa Department. Towns around the volcano belong to the Chuquibamba, Machaguay, Pampacolca and Viraco Districts. The volcano can be reached on paved roads through the town of Andahua, either from Arequipa or through Aplao from the Pan-American Highway. Roads also pass along the northern and western sides of the volcano.

=== Regional ===
The Andes stretch along the western coast of South America from Tierra del Fuego northwards to Venezuela, forming the longest mountain chain in the world. More regionally, the volcano is in the Cordillera Ampato, a mountain range which lies at an average of 100 kilometres (62 mi) from the Pacific coastline, and contains nearly one hundred glaciers.

Coropuna is in the Central Volcanic Zone of the Andes, which contains 44 stratovolcanoes – including many of the world's highest – and several glaciated volcanoes. Besides Coropuna, some of the latter are Sara Sara, Solimana, Mismi, Ampato, Hualca Hualca, Sabancaya, Chachani, Misti, Ubinas, Huaynaputina, Tutupaca, Yucamane and Casiri. Also found nearby are Neogene-age calderas. Sixteen volcanoes in Peru are active or potentially active.

There is no habitation on Coropuna above 5,200 metres (17,100 ft), but numerous villages dot the lower slopes. (Note: Villages on the lower slopes of Corpuna include: Ocororuro, Arma, Maucallacta, Purhua Purhua, Chaupipuna, Utchu-Amayani, Torilla, Patilla, Pallca, Alco Llacta, Viques, Campanayo, Pecoy, Tagre, Pillcull, Chupacca, Chipcama, Cabra Grande, Pampacolca, Huncor, Huanjo, Santa Maria, Toma de Hayllaura and Huayllaura.) Agriculture and animal husbandry are the most common economic activities; there are copper and gold mines as well. The city of Arequipa lies 150 km (93 mi) to the southeast.

=== Local ===
==== General outline ====
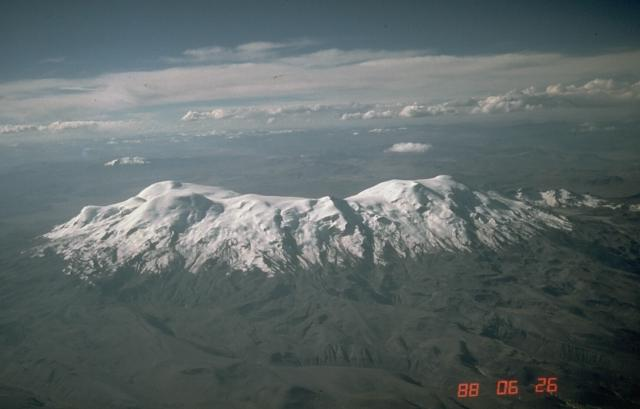
Coropuna seen from the south in 1988

Seen from above, Coropuna has a pear-shaped outline and is a 20 km (12 mi) east–west ridge that features four summits that are separated by broad saddles. In addition, there is another summit north of the east–west trend. A 5,558 m (18,235 ft) high subsidiary peak named Cerro Cuncaicha lies east of Coropuna; it is an extinct stratovolcano. Coropuna covers a surface area of 240 square kilometres (93 sq mi) and its various main summits rise about three kilometres (1.9 mi) above the surrounding plateau.

The volcano is formed from alternating layers of ignimbrite and lava, and consists of coalesced stratovolcanoes and seven separate coulees. Ice cover makes discerning its structure difficult, but about six separate peaks as well as six not readily recognisable summit craters have been counted. Additional lava domes form a southeastward trending line on the southwestern side of the volcano and dikes crop out close to Lake Pallarcocha. Coropuna overlies the margin of a buried caldera.

The higher elevations of Coropuna consist of an ice cap and glaciated terrain but old lava flows with gentle slopes and blocky lava crop out from underneath the ice. Regions of hydrothermally altered rocks, lava flows, pyroclastic flows and areas covered by volcanic ash occur all around the mountain. Glacial activity has eroded these volcanic rocks, carving valleys into them or removing them altogether. This process created U-shaped valleys such as Buenavista, Cospanja and Tuilaqui on the southern flank, and glacial valleys such as Chaque, Mapa Mayo, Río Blanco, Torcom and Ullulo on the northern slopes. Glacial valleys of Coropuna are up to 300 m (980 ft) deep and seven km (4.3 mi) long.

There are several collapse scarps on the mountain, especially around its central sector. A sector collapse took place on the southwestern flank and formed a landslide deposit as well as a horseshoe-shaped valley that was later filled by glaciers. Also on the southern side, mud-water flow deposits have been found in the Capiza River valley and appear to relate to Coropuna; at least eight such debris flows have been identified. Lahars (mudflows) have reached the Colca River valley. Lahars are dangerous phenomena owing to their high speed and density, causing large scale destruction and fatalities, and can be generated both by volcanic and meteorological processes. Such lahars occurred in 2016 and 2023, causing damage to agricultural land and irrigation infrastructure.

==== Lakes, rivers and groundwater ====
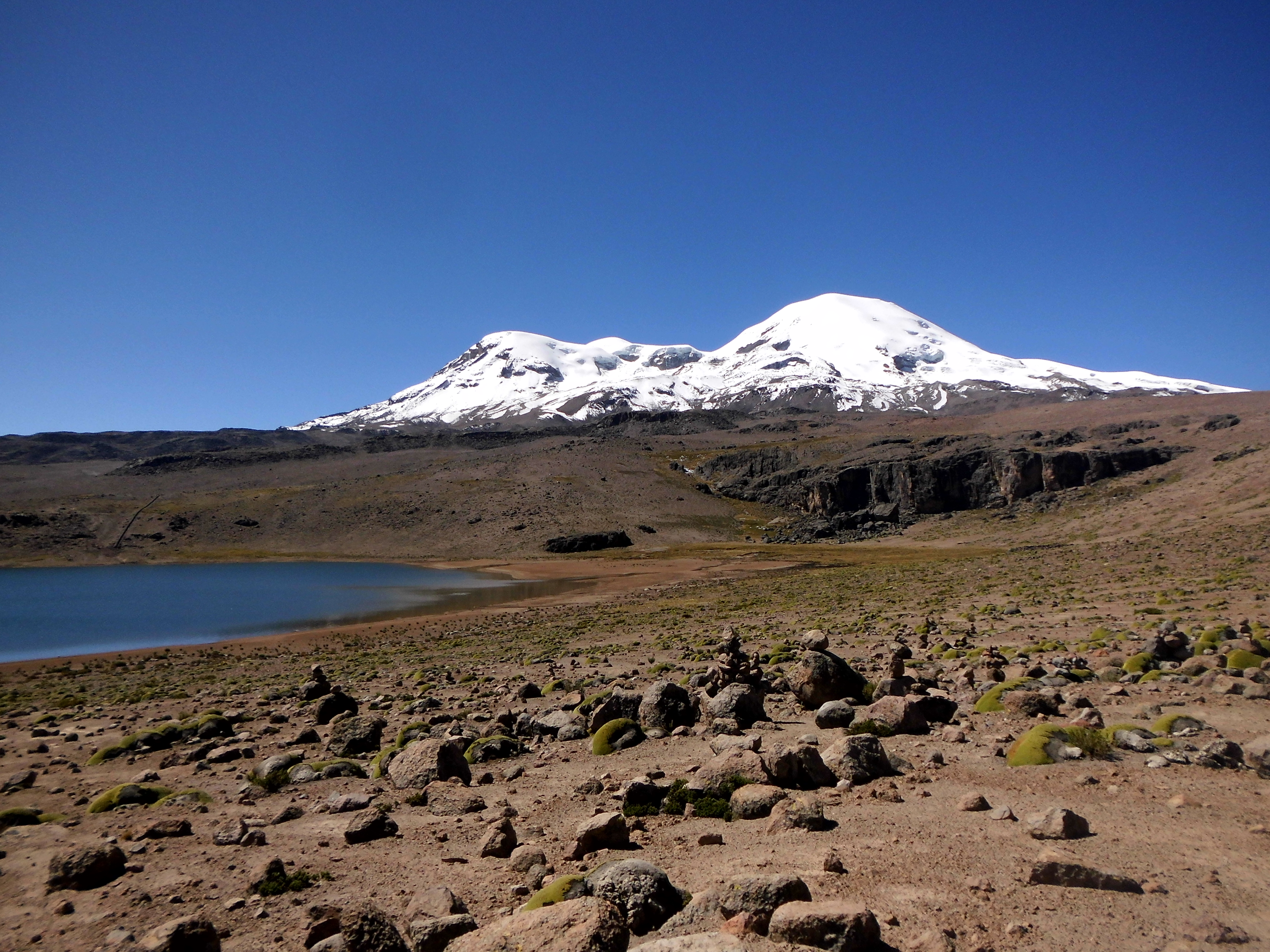
Coropuna seen from Lake Pallacocha

Lakes lie on the flanks of the volcano. These include Lake Pallarcocha on the southwestern flank on formerly glaciated terrain, Laguna Pucaylla on Coropuna's northeastern side and Laguna Caracara on the southeastern side. A number of streams and rivers originate on the mountain. Clockwise around Coropuna, these include Quebrada Chauqui-Huayco, Rio Amayani on the northern side, Quebrada Chinchina/Infernillo, Quebrada Jollpa, Quebrada Caspanja with the lake Laguna Caracara, Quebrada Buena Vista, Quebrada Tuallqui, Rio Testane on the southern flank, Rio de Huayllaura on the southwestern flank, Quebrada del Apacheta, Quebrada Sigue Chico and Quebrada Sepulturayoc on the western flank. The Rio Blanco and Rio Amayani eventually form the Rio Arma, while the Rio Capiza discharges water from Coropuna to the Colca River. During the winter dry season, most of these rivers do not carry substantial discharge.

The volcano is situated on a drainage divide. Most of Coropuna drains to the Rio Arma west of the volcano, a tributary of the Ocoña River, while to the east, the Colca River is part of the Majes River watershed. An endorheic area that receives meltwater from the volcano also exists northeast from Coropuna, on Pampa Pucaylla where the lake of the same name lies.

Glacial meltwater seldom forms streams. The Quebrada Ullulo on the northern side is the largest such meltwater stream. Glacial input is more significant to groundwater; especially on the northern flank glacial meltwater makes up a large fraction of local river discharge. The andesites of Coropuna and its glacial sediments host aquifers that convey glacial meltwater to springs and rivers. Some aquifers on the eastern side are influenced by sulfur-containing rocks.

==== Surrounding terrain ====
Coropuna rises two km (1.2 mi) above the surrounding terrain from a base elevation of 4,500 m (14,800 ft), and about 3.5 km (2.2 mi) on the southern side where the Rio Llacllaja has incised the underlying basement almost to the foot of the volcano, forming sharp, amphitheatre-like valleys. In general, many deep valleys cut into the flanks of the volcano and give the mountain an "impressive topographic relief".

The region is characterised by high plateaus separated by deep canyons, including some of the world's deepest gorges that reach depths of 600–3,000 m (2,000–9,800 ft). Apart from river erosion, giant landslides have affected the Altiplano below Coropuna, such as the Chuquibamba landslide, which took place over the last 120,000 years in the form of multiple collapse events within a fault-controlled basin.

Geomorphologically, Coropuna lies at the edge of the Altiplano high plateau on the Western Cordillera mountain range; in the Central Andes this mountain chain is split into two ranges – the western and the eastern Cordillera – separated by the Altiplano. The Pucuncho Basin and Firura volcano lie north of Coropuna, while Solimana volcano is northwest from Coropuna. Sara Sara is another volcano in the area. A large lava dome lies northwest of Coropuna while Cerro Pumaranra, a 5,089 m (16,696 ft) eroded volcano, is to the northeast. 19 km (12 mi) west-southwest from Coropuna lies the 4,855 m (15,928 ft) high Antapuna, while the Andahua "Valley of the Volcanoes" is 20 km (12 mi) east-northeast of Coropuna.

=== Elevation and size ===
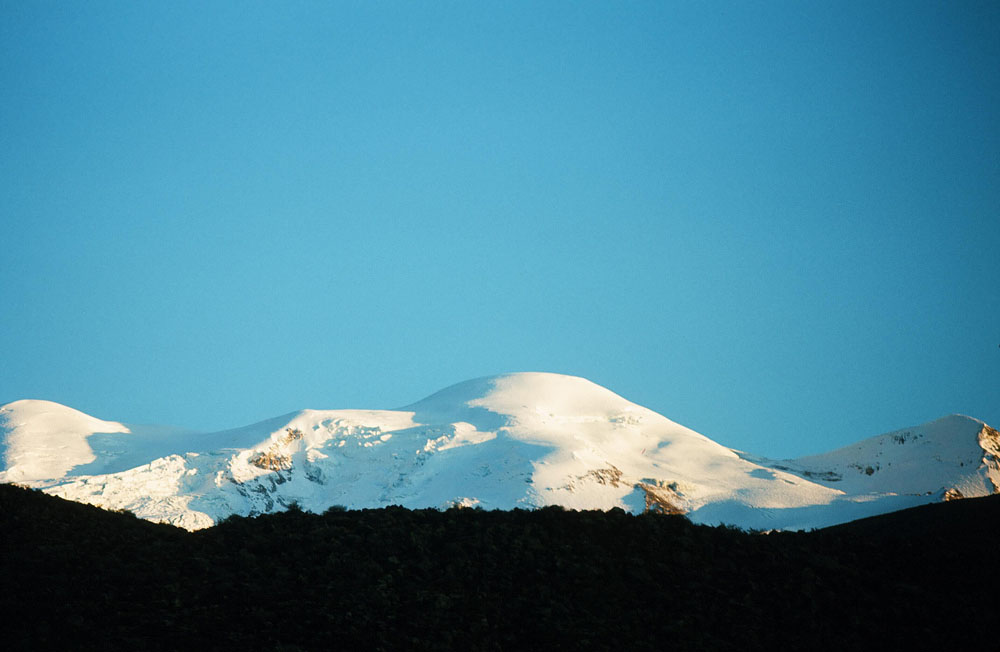
Coropuna Este

Coropuna is the largest and highest volcano in Peru, the highest peak of the Cordillera Ampato and the third-highest mountain in Peru. The highest point of Coropuna is the northwestern dome named Coropuna Casulla, with 6,377 metres (20,922 ft) elevation. Mountaineering sources also cite an elevation of 6,425 m (21,079 ft) for the El Toro summit, which would make Coropuna the 22nd highest mountain in the Andes. (Note: Other estimates of its height are 6,380 m (20,930 ft); 6,426 m (21,083 ft) on the western summit; 6,446 m (21,148 ft); and 6,450 m (21,160 ft).)

Estimates on the height of Coropuna have changed over time. In the 19th century, it was one of the candidates for "highest mountain in Peru", with the Mapa del Perú (Map of Peru) of Antonio Raimondi giving an estimated height of 6,949 m (22,799 ft); other candidates were peaks in the Cordillera Blanca. In 1910 it was believed that the volcano was over 7,000 m (23,000 ft) high and thus the highest mountain in South America, ahead of Aconcagua, although a North American expedition during the preceding year had determined that Coropuna was not the highest, as they only found an elevation of 6,615 m (21,703 ft), and Huascaran is higher than this. Varying snow elevations might also lead to varying height estimates.

Coropuna has several summits (up to ten overall according to one count) which exceed 6,000 m (20,000 ft) elevation, plus a 5,623 m (18,448 ft) northern summit. Those with individual names are the northwestern Coropuna Casulla at 6,377 m (20,922 ft), El Toro, the western Nevado Pallacocha at 6,171 m (20,246 ft), the central Coropuna Central II at 6,161 m (20,213 ft), Escalera at 6,171 m (20,246 ft) in the western sector of the volcano, Paiche at 6,330 m (20,770 ft) in the central sector, and Coropuna Este and Yana Ranra at 6,305 m (20,686 ft) in the eastern sector.

== Ice cap ==
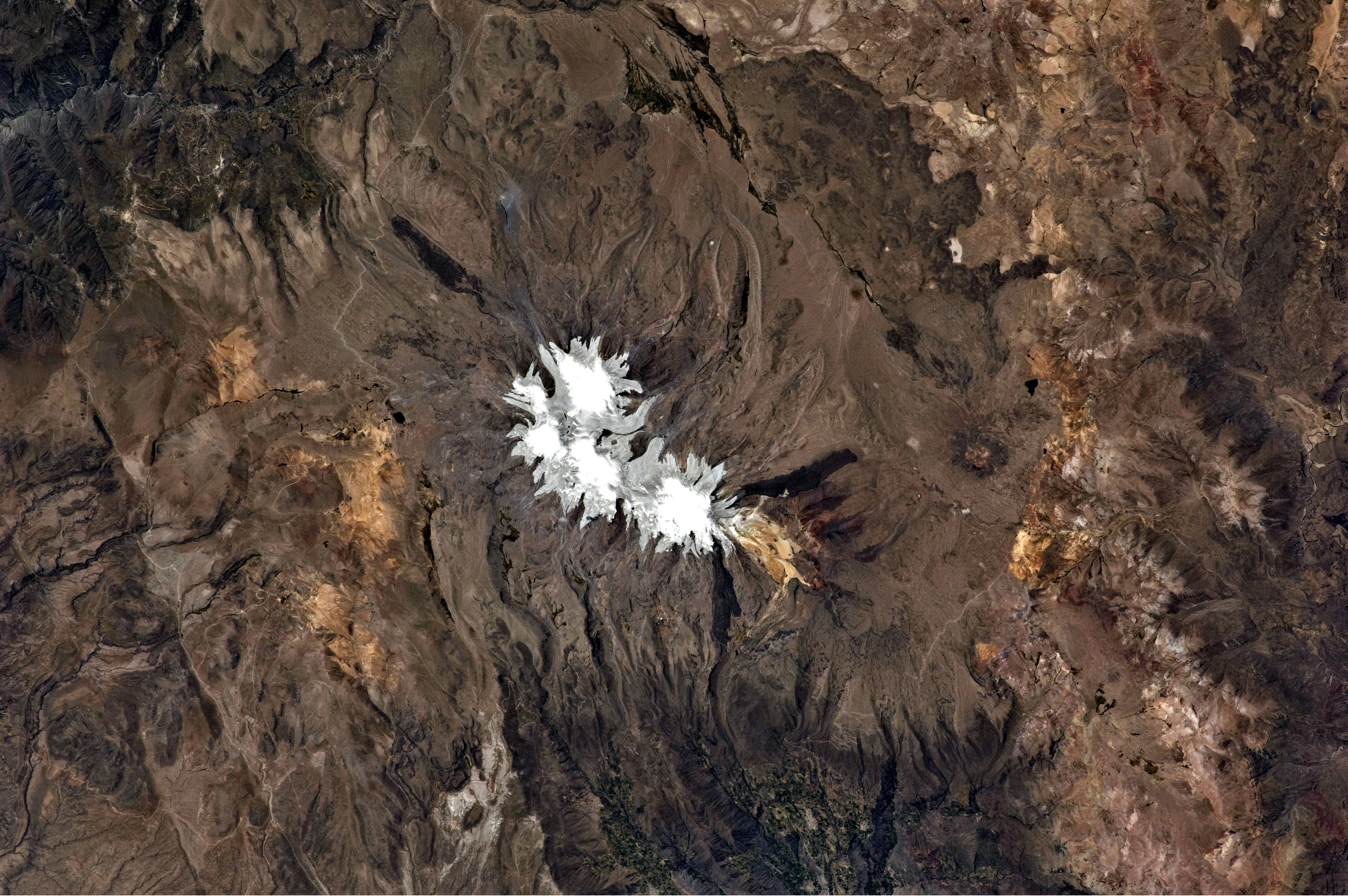
Coropuna's ice cap seen from space in 2010

Coropuna features the largest ice cap of the tropics. As of 2014 it was 8.5 km (5.3 mi) wide and eleven km (6.8 mi) long. It is larger than the Quelccaya Ice Cap 250 km (160 mi) farther northeast, which was considered to be the largest, but has since shrunk to a size less than Coropuna's. A subsidiary peak named Cerro Cuncaicha, east of Coropuna, has a small ice cap as well. In general, Peruvian glaciers form the bulk of the world's tropical glaciers. The ice cap consists of three ice domes and many glaciers. Perennial snow fields are present on Coropuna, sometimes making it hard to measure the true extent of glaciation or glacier retreat.

On average, the ice cap of Coropuna is about 80.8 m (265 ft) thick, with maximum thicknesses exceeding 180 m (590 ft). In 2003–2004 the ice cap had a volume of about 3.69 cubic kilometres (0.89 cu mi) snow water equivalents. Ice cores have been taken from the Coropuna ice cap and from a summit crater; one of these ice cores covers a timespan beginning from 20,000 years ago.

Penitentes reaching heights of two m (6 ft 7 in) and seracs (blocks of ice in glaciers delimited by cracks) occur on the glaciers, while debris cover is rare. The ice of Coropuna's ice cap is mostly temperate. Mudflows (lahars) originated from the ice cap and left deposits at the bottom of valleys. A lahar took place on the southeastern flank on 22 December 2016, causing damage to water infrastructure and pastures below the volcano.

=== Glaciers and periglacial phenomena ===
A number of glaciers flow down from the ice cap, their number variously estimated to be 15, 17 and 23. Some glaciers have been named; on the southwestern flank two glaciers are known as Azufrioc 1 and 2, three Rio Blanco 1 through 3 and six Tuialqui 1 through 6. Eighteen separate accumulation areas have been found as well. There are no substantive valley glaciers presently on Coropuna and some glaciers, especially in the eastern side, emanate from cirques. The ongoing downward movement of the ice on Coropuna produces icequakes.

Glaciers descend to elevations of about 5,100 to 5,300 m (16,700 to 17,400 ft) on the southern flank, and to about 5,500 to 5,800 m (18,000 to 19,000 ft) on the northern flank. This is higher than the freezing level, owing to the dry climate; the freezing level at Coropuna lies at about 4,900 m (16,100 ft) elevation. In 2001, the ice limits were located at elevations of 5,300 m (17,400 ft) on the southern and at 5,600 m (18,400 ft) on the northern flank.

Moraines are mostly found on Coropuna's northern and southern side and reach lengths of three to eight km (1.9 to 5.0 mi), with longer moraines on the northern flank. In general, moraines on Coropuna are steep and have prominent crests as they are little eroded. Grey-coloured, fresh moraines up to 500 m (1,600 ft) from the ice cap may reflect the position of the glaciers before the onset of glacier retreat which has left small mounds that often contain ice between these moraines and the ice cap and small, discontinuous moraines.

Apart from normal glaciers, 78 rock glaciers have been counted on Coropuna, but only 11 of them are considered to be active. Permafrost occurs at elevations exceeding 5,100 metres (16,700 ft) on the southern and 5,750 metres (18,860 ft) on the northern flank. Cryoturbation, gelifluction, patterned grounds, solifluction and other periglacial landforms are noticeable at over 4,500 m (14,800 ft) elevation.

==== Recent area and retreat ====
Extent of the ice cap over the years, from various sources: (Note: As cited in Forget et al (2008), Palenque et al (2018), Marinque et al (2018), Silverio (2018), Silverio, Herold & Peduzzi (2010), and Silverio & Jaquet (2012).)

Measuring the surface area of Coropuna's ice cap is difficult as seasonal snow can be mistaken for ice, and different studies come to various conclusions about the retreat rate, due to the use of different time periods and methodological practices. However, all studies conclude that the net retreat trend is obvious and that the ice cap is diminishing. Retreat rates shortly before 2009 reached 13 per cent in only 21 years. Between 1980 and 2014 the ice cap shrank at a rate of 0.409 km^{2}/a (0.158 mi^{2}/a) with a 2015 estimate amounting to 0.5 km^{2}/a (0.19 mi^{2}/a), and a brief slowdown observed during the late 1990s and early 2000s and acceleration between 2013 and 2023. Total shrinkage has been estimated to amount to 26 per cent between 1962 and 2000, and by 18 per cent between 1955 and 2007. Retreat is faster on the northern side of the mountain and slower among the rock glaciers and rock-covered glaciers. If retreat continues at the current rate, the ice cap will disappear in 2120.

The Coropuna ice cap retreat follows the pattern recorded elsewhere in Peru such as in the Cordillera Blanca, Cordillera Vilcanota and the mountains Ampato, Quelccaya and Sabancaya, and is slightly slower than in other Peruvian glaciers. All of this retreat is attributed to global warming, and tends to increase during El Niño years owing to a drier climate. The glaciers lose mass through both sublimation and melting. Ablation occurs year-round and is diurnal. Recently deglaciated terrain is covered by rock debris.

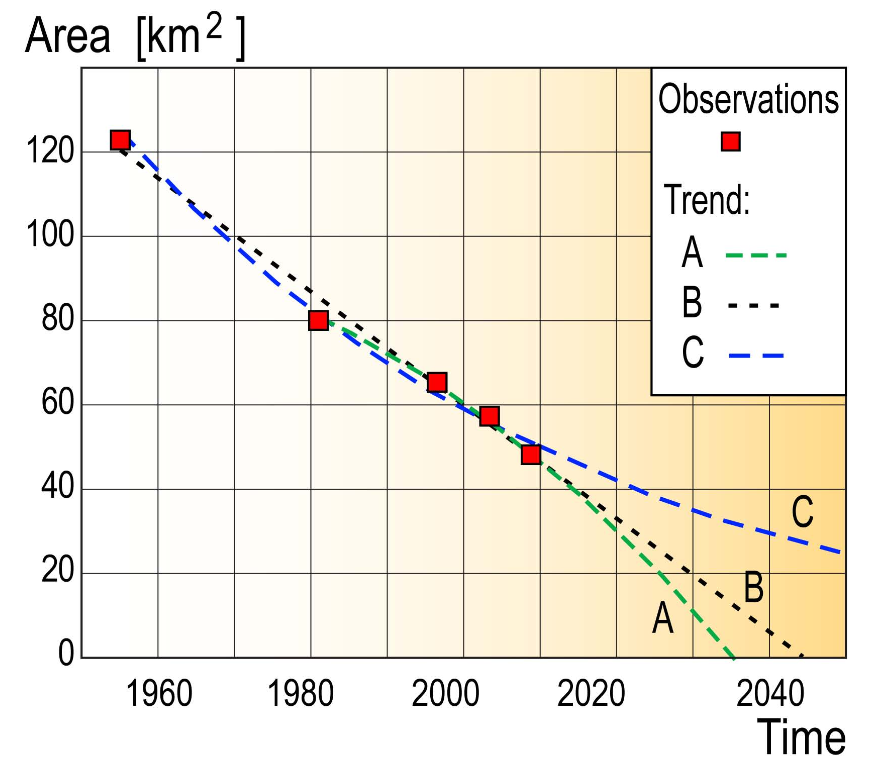
Glacier trends and extrapolation

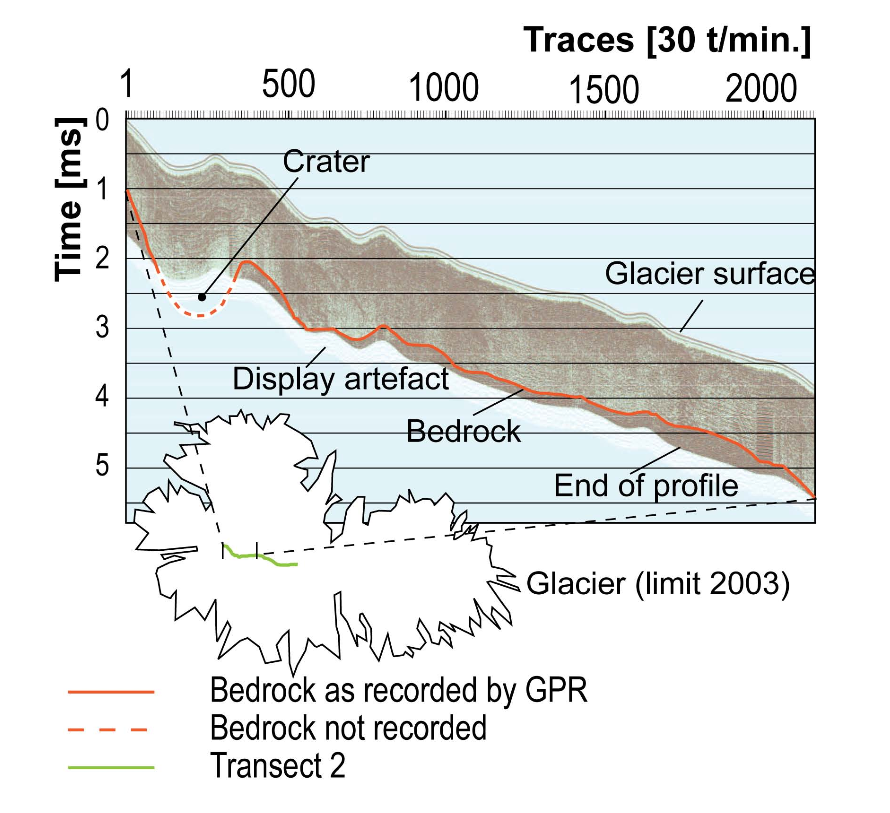
Ice profile

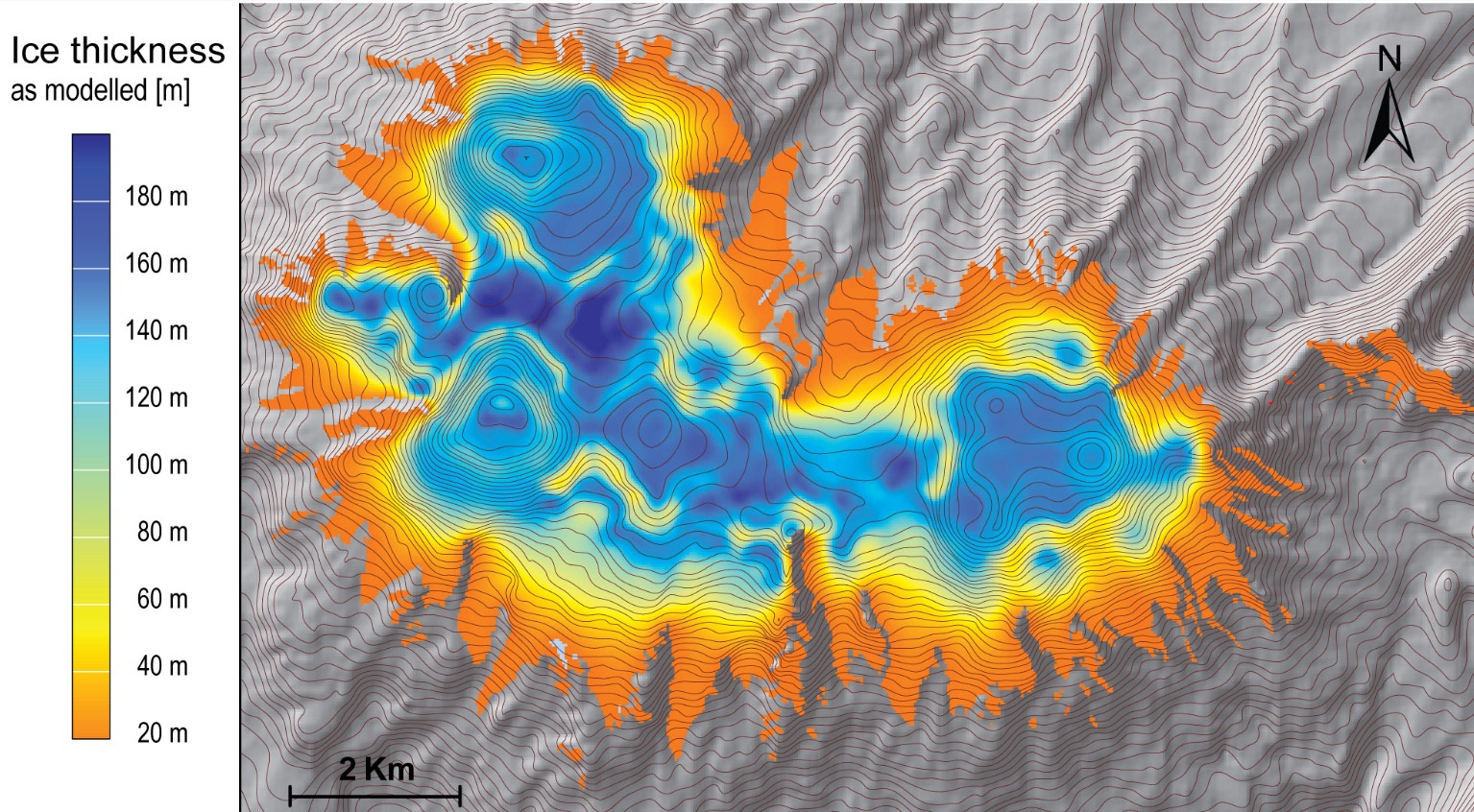
Ice thickness

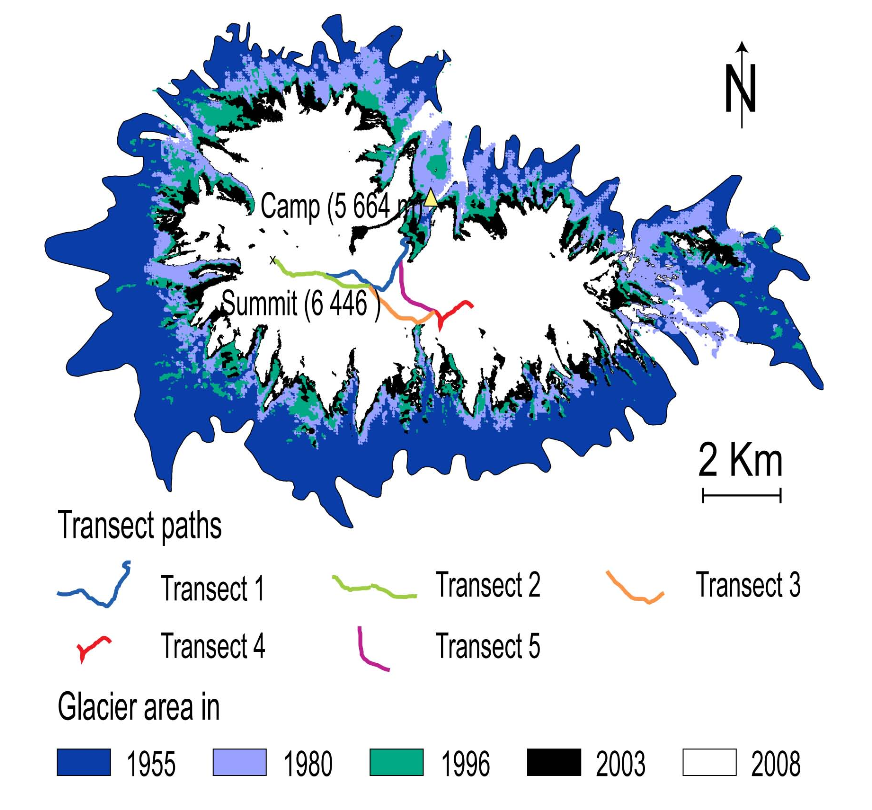
Ice schematics

=== Glacial history ===
Before the first human settlement of the area, the ice cap on Coropuna was much larger than today, with its surface exceeding 500 km^{2} (190 sq mi) and its glaciers descending to much lower elevations. Additionally, glaciers also expanded from the mountains Pumaranra, Pucaylla and Cuncaicha to the east of Coropuna. They covered the Pampa Pucaylla northeast from Coropuna and descended the Jellojello valley and other valleys to the east. Glacial valleys radiate from Coropuna, and glaciofluvial landforms are associated with moraines.

Regional climate oscillations are recorded in the ice masses of Coropuna. The glacial history of the volcano has been reconstructed with tephrochronology (using dated tephra layers such as those from the 1600 Huaynaputina eruption), radiocarbon dating and surface exposure dating using helium-3. Three separate moraine generations and about five separate glacial stages have been recorded on the volcano. Glacial advances on Coropuna appear to be synchronous to advances of the ice sheets in the Northern Hemisphere. Glaciers developed on other mountains in the region as well.

==== Last glacial maximum ====
During the Last Glacial Maximum (LGM) 25,000–20,000 years ago, valley glaciers on Coropuna were considerably longer than today. The longest glacier, at 12 km (7.5 mi), was in the Quebrada Ullulo. The glaciers had a cover of boulders and gravel and formed tall moraines, and both lateral and terminal moraines where outlet glaciers ended. At the crest, these moraines were as much as 100 m (330 ft) high, eight km (5.0 mi) long, and five–ten m (16–33 ft) wide. On the northern flank, moraine systems have been observed in the Santiago, Ullulo, Keaña, Queñua Ranra, Cuncaicha, Pommulca and Huajra Huire valleys, while the southeastern flank was covered by glaciers in the Yanaorco, Viques, Cospanja, Buena Vista Este, Buena Vista Oeste and Huasi valleys. Rock bars occur in some glacial valleys on the southern and southwestern side of the volcano. There are large cirques around Cerro Cuncaicha.

The LGM ice cap had an area of at least 365 km^{2} (141 sq mi), with glaciers descending to 3,780–4,540 m (12,400–14,900 ft) elevation. Glacier ends were lower on the northern and western sides, probably due to airflow-mediated variations in sublimation. The growth of the ice cap has been explained by a decrease of the equilibrium line altitude of about 750 m (2,460 ft). Assuming constant precipitation, temperatures may have decreased by 4.5–5.5 °C (8.1–9.9 °F). The glaciers began to retreat between 12,000 and 11,000 years ago.

==== Other glacial periods ====
Ice has been present on Coropuna for at least 80,000 years. At least two pre-LGM advances spread beyond the area that was covered with ice during the LGM, with an expansion occurring in particular in the eastern sector of the volcano. Moraines older than marine isotope stage 2 are widespread. Those close to the village of Viraco may date back 40,000–45,000 years and thus be part of an earlier glaciation, and old dates of 47,000–31,000 and 61,000–37,000 years ago in the Huayllaura and Sigue Chico valleys could reflect even larger glacier expansions during marine isotope stage 3 or 4.

Glaciers retreated after the end of the last glacial maximum 20,000–18,000 years ago and then re-expanded. During the Late Glacial, a group of moraines formed between the position of the LGM moraines and the position of the recent moraines, with one lateglacial advance dated to either 13,400–10,000 or 13,900–11,900 years ago. Full glacial conditions lasted until 10,000–9,000 years ago; minor advances took place about 13,000–9,000 years ago, and again some 6,000 years ago. The late glacial advances coincide with similar glacier expansions worldwide and some of them may correlate with the Younger Dryas cold period or the Antarctic Cold Reversal. During the Little Ice Age, glaciers on Coropuna did not expand much, although some rock glaciers might have formed during that time. The glaciers descended to 4,900 m (16,100 ft) elevation.

=== Importance as a source of water ===
Glaciers in Peru are important sources of water for local communities and for hydropower generation, especially during the dry season; their shrinkage is thus of concern. A 2003 study by Bryan G. Mark and Geoffrey O. Seltzer estimated that about 30 per cent of the dry season runoff in the Cordillera Blanca comes from glaciers. Meltwater from the glaciers on Coropuna sustains the baseflow of the rivers during dry periods; Coropuna is an important source of water for the valleys of the surrounding areas and for the desert-like piedmont, with more than 60,000 people depending directly or indirectly on water originating from it. This water supply is threatened by the retreat of the glaciers and would require costly mitigation measures to compensate for its reduction. The Peruvian government is making preparations for Coropuna ceasing to be a contributor to the local water supply by 2025; a 2018 study and re-evaluation of past data concluded that the ice cap should persist until about 2120, and recommends that greater in situ monitoring of Coropuna's glaciers is needed to aid future planning and mitigation. Glacial meltwater has a low content of regulated metals while springs sometimes have very high concentrations.

== Geology ==
=== Regional setting ===
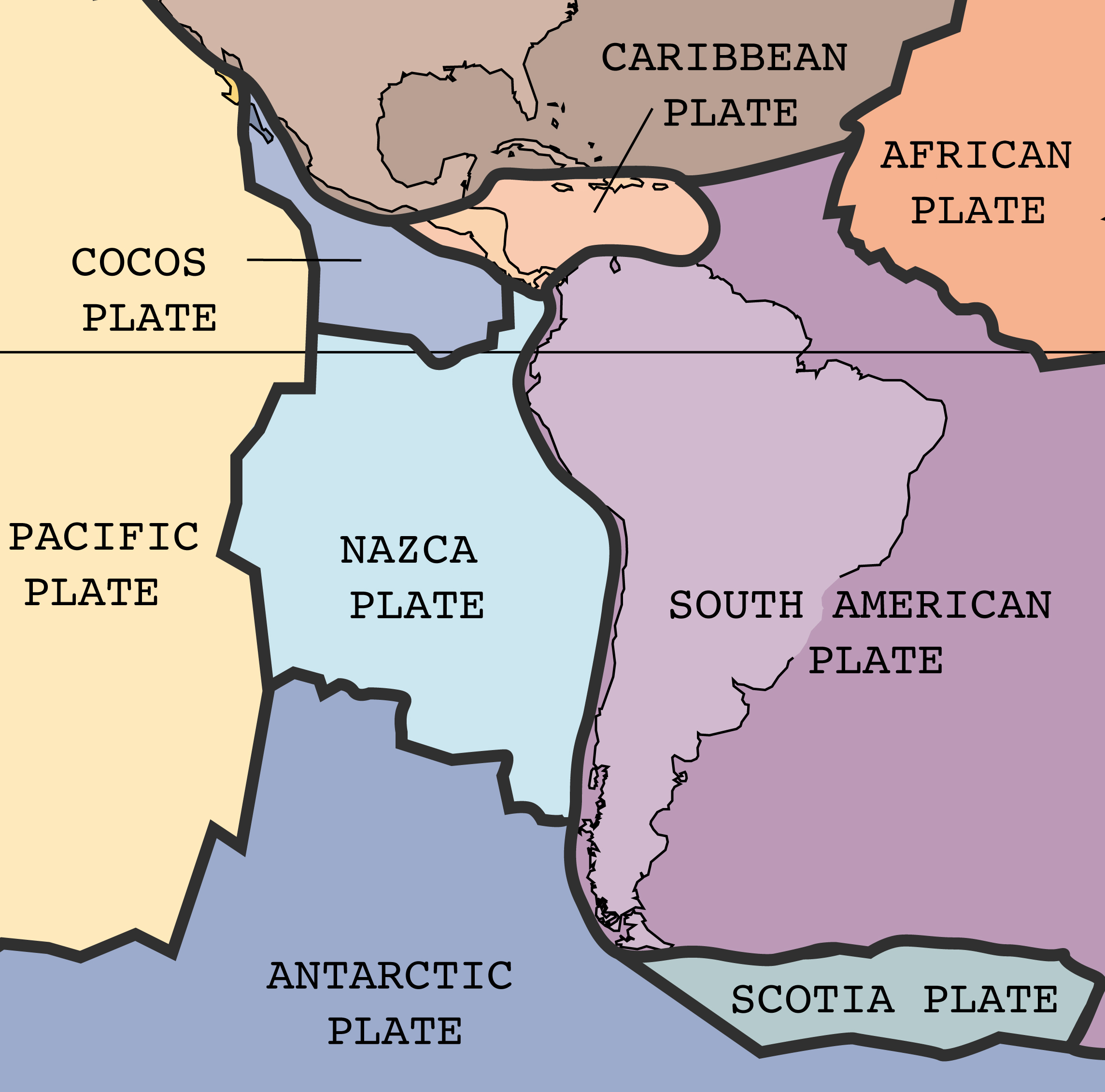
The larger tectonic plates around South America

Off the coast of Peru, the Nazca Plate subducts beneath the South American Plate at a rate of five–seven centimetres per year (2.0–2.8 in/year) or nine centimetres per year (3.5 in/year). This subduction process, along with the subduction of the Antarctic Plate also underneath the South American Plate, is responsible for the volcanism in the Andes and the uplift of the mountain chain. In the Cordillera Occidental (Western Cordillera) uplift commenced about 50 million years ago in the Eocene, paused until 25 million years ago in the Oligocene, and increased substantially after about 10 million years ago in the Miocene. Andean uplift in the area of Coropuna is ongoing.

Coropuna is part of the volcanic arc of southern Peru and is considered to be a member of the Barroso volcanic arc. There are over six hundred volcanoes in southern Peru, and the entire Cordillera Occidental from southern Peru to northern Chile is covered with volcanic rocks, although present-day volcanic activity is scarce. Many of the older volcanoes are deeply eroded by glaciation, while younger volcanoes often still resemble cones.

Volcanic activity in the Andes occurred during three eras. The first was between 195 and 190 million years ago in the Early Jurassic, and generated the Chocolate Formation. The second between 78 and 50 million years ago (Late Cretaceous to Early Eocene) generated the Toquepala Formation and the Andean batholiths. Volcanic activity in southern Peru commenced about 13 million years ago in the Miocene. One volcanic unit – after being folded and eroded – was covered by a second lava and tuff unit, which in turn was followed by the emplacement of large volcanoes. Ignimbrites and stratovolcano activity, at times subdivided into a "rhyolitic" and an "andesitic" formation, alternated.

=== Basement ===
Coropuna is constructed atop of 14 million year old ignimbrites and lava flows of Neogene age. Individual ignimbrites crop out mainly in valleys; on the highlands they are buried beneath more recent volcanic products. The volcanic basement includes the Miocene to Plio-Pleistocene-era Tacaza, Huaylillas, Sencca and Barroso Formations; the latter formation includes Coropuna itself. Below these formations lie the sedimentary Murco and Socosani formations and the Yura Group, which are sediments of Jurassic-Cretaceous age with intruded plutons of the same age; finally there is a Basal Complex of Precambrian age.

=== Faults and lineaments ===
The basement is cut by faults and lineaments such as the Viraco-San Antonio Fault that crosses the edifice, Pampacolca Fault on the southern side of the volcano and the Pumaranra and Cerro Casulla lineaments, which trend southeast–northwest and northeast–southwest, respectively. One east–west lineament may have influenced the recent volcanism; the alignment of Coropuna with Sara Sara, Solimana and El Misti may indicate a tectonic control on the volcano in general. On the southern flank, Holocene normal faults have offset lava flows and streams.

=== Composition ===
The rocks released by Coropuna are dark brown to black and porphyritic. They consist of andesite, dacite, rhyodacite, rhyolite, trachy-basaltic andesite, trachyandesite and trachydacite. The more recent lava flows have been dacitic or trachydacitic. Phenocryst phases include amphibole, biotite, plagioclase, pyroxene and titanomagnetite. Aside from the volcanic rocks, deposits of salts, sulfur and travertine produced by hot springs are found on the southern flank.

The volcanic rocks define a calc-alkaline potassium-rich suite which resembles that of Chilean and Peruvian volcanoes such as Tutupaca. They contain large amounts of rubidium, strontium and barium. Complicated processes of crystallisation and interaction with Earth's crust appear to have produced the magma.

== Eruption history ==
The beginning of Coropuna's growth has variously been placed over 5 million years ago, during the Pliocene or late Miocene, but most of its structure developed during the Quaternary. Volcanic activity has been subdivided into two stages: explosive eruptions during the now mostly eroded Coropuna I stage produced volcanic ash, pyroclastic flows and pumice but also lava flows, while Coropuna II above 6,000 m (20,000 ft) elevation erupted lava flows from the now snow-covered vents. The existence of a Coropuna III sequence has been proposed. The most recent eruption products have been described as the "Andahua Group". About 5.3 million years ago, the Sunjillpa volcano was active southwest from Coropuna, while Cunciacha east of Coropuna is of lower Pleistocene and Pumaranra of Pliocene to Quaternary age.

A major ignimbrite eruption took place about 2 million years ago at Coropuna; its deposits have been identified west of the volcano and it led to the destruction of the edifice, which later re-formed on the remains of the old volcano. The occurrence of explosive eruptions during a mostly effusive activity has been found at Chachani and Sara Sara as well.

In addition, the Upper Sencca Ignimbrite, the Lower Sencca Ignimbrite and the Chuquibamba (Huaylillas) Ignimbrite may have originated here as well; the latter was produced by a volcanic explosivity index 7 class "super-eruption" between 14.3 and 13.2 million years ago in the Middle Miocene. The Upper Sencca Ignimbrites are a 2.09–1.76 million years old composite ignimbrite which form a 10–30 m (33–98 ft) thick apron around Coropuna and other regional volcanoes; Coropuna appears to have formed on top of one of the Upper Sencca Ignimbrite vents.

After a hiatus, volcanic activity continued into the Pleistocene. Several lava flows on the western and central sides of Coropuna have been dated, yielding ages ranging from 410,000 ± 9,000 to 62,600 ± 4,300 years ago. During the last glacial maximum, Coropuna was inactive and moraines buried its lava flows. However, one or two tephra layers on a moraine close to the village of Viraco on the southern side have been dated to be about 41,000 and 30,000 – 31,000 years old. These ages correspond to radiocarbon ages of 37,370 ± 1,160 and 27,200 ± 300 years. These tephras may have originated in fissure eruptions associated with the three recent lava flows. In postglacial times lava bombs, lapilli and volcanic ash were deposited on previously glaciated terrain. Pumice deposits may have formed during the Holocene.

=== Holocene ===
No eruptions of Coropuna during historical or modern times are known, and the volcano was considered to be long-extinct. However, young-looking ʻaʻā lava or block lava flows erupted during the Holocene and in part overlie late-glacial moraines. Their vents are now hidden beneath glacier ice, and the flows have been affected by later glacial advances. These lava flows are found on the west–northwest, south–southeast and northeast side of the mountain:

- A northwesterly lava flow – Coropuna's longest at 8.5 km (5.3 mi) – occupies the Cerro Sepulturayoc valley. It has been dated to about 6,000 years ago, but research published in 2019 has suggested it may have erupted somewhat earlier, during the Late Glacial period.
- A southeasterly flow lies in the Cospanja valley and is either 1,100 ± 100 or 700 ± 200 years old, the latter age being derived from cosmogenic isotope dating. It was probably formed during a single eruption and is four kilometres (2.5 mi) long.
- A dark, young-looking lava flow runs northeasterly in the Queñua Ranra valley and is five kilometres (3.1 mi) long. The eruption took place about 2,100 ± 200 years ago according to cosmogenic isotope dating. Its deposition was preceded by the eruption of lava bombs that cover the valley and by the production of a lahar that advanced 14 km (8.7 mi) from its source. Whether a secondary lava flow in the same valley occurred at the same time or later is not clear, as that flow has not yet been dated.

The ages of the flows indicate an eastward shift in activity. The southeasterly and northeasterly flows may have been erupted within 500 years from the same fissure, while the eruption of the northwesterly flow might be a consequence of the retreat of the ice cap. These lava flows are the most recent manifestation of volcanic activity and they imply that Coropuna is still active; it is thus considered to be a dormant volcano, rather than an extinct one. There is no evidence of Holocene tephras in peat bog drill cores and volcanism at Coropuna since the last ice age has been primarily effusive.

=== Present day status ===
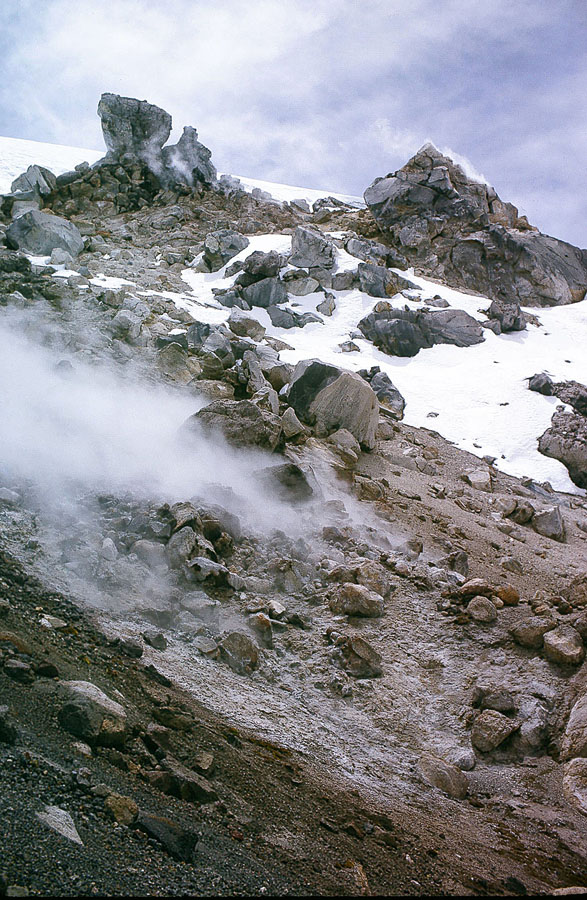
Steam rising on Coropuna Este

The volcano is still hydrothermally active. Six hot springs are found on Coropuna, mostly on the southeastern foot, such as at Acopallpa, Antaura/Antauro, Viques, Ccollpa/Collpa, Buena Vista and Aguas Calientes and, on its northern flank, at Huamaní Loma. Their water temperatures range between 18 and 51 °C (64 and 124 °F). With the exception of the last two, which are situated in glacial terrain, these hot springs rise within valleys via rock fractures. Geochemical analyses of the water from these springs published in 2015 show no major variations in composition, implying a stable volcanic system. Whether solfataric or fumarolic activity occurs at Coropuna is unclear (Note: Pits in the ice with thermal anomalies were reported in 2002.), and the thick glaciation indicates that the summit craters have no thermal activity.

Some of the hot springs on Coropuna are used for bathing. The volcano had been considered a potential site for geothermal power production, but research published in 1998 concluded that the available energy of the Coropuna area was insufficient.

The first volcano activity report published in 2018 noted ongoing seismic activity involving volcano-tectonic earthquakes. Seismic swarms were observed at Coropuna after the 2001 southern Peru earthquake and were possibly triggered by that earthquake. Observations of deformation of the volcanic edifice have shown that gravitational instability and soil water absorption result in movements of part of the volcano but, as a whole, Coropuna shows no evidence of volcanic deformation.

=== Hazards and monitoring ===
The Peruvian Instituto Geológico Minero y Metalúrgico (INGEMMET) monitors Coropuna for activity. It uses data such as the composition of hot spring waters and the shape of the volcano as estimated by satellite images, GPS and geodesy, as well as information from five seismic stations. Seismic monitoring of the volcano began in 2008-2010 and was supplemented with geophysical monitoring in 2018. A volcanic hazard map and scenarios of lahar generation have been published, the Peruvian government publishes regular status reports. The Peruvian Geophysical Institute considers Coropuna a "high risk" volcano; about 90,000 people live in risk areas, and the sites most in danger are towns in the steep southern valleys.

Together with El Misti, Sabancaya and Ubinas, Coropuna is considered to be one of Peru's most dangerous volcanoes. The presence of a large ice cap, and therefore the risk of incandescent volcanic rocks melting that ice, creates a hazard of lahars, or mudflows, such as those that in 1985 killed over 23,000 people at Nevado del Ruiz volcano in Colombia. The risk to life is further increased by Coropuna's steep slopes and by the concentration of people in nearby valleys. The terrain around the volcano has one of the greatest topographic reliefs in the world and a number of towns lie on the floor of the Majes valley, right down to the Pacific Ocean where the district capital Camaná with 20,000 inhabitants is situated. Although there is no evidence of past mudflows of such size, lahars could reach as far as the coast, affecting a number of towns and infrastructure such as roads, antennas and small hydropower plants in the provinces Condesuyos, Castilla and Camaná. According to the 2007 census, 110,481 people lived in the provinces that span Coropuna and lie downstream of it.

Lava flows are also a potential danger at Coropuna. Other hazards with lesser probabilities are directed volcanic blasts, lava dome collapses, fast-moving massive pyroclastic flows and flows of pumice and volcanic ash, lava bombs and shock waves from volcanic explosions.

== Climate ==
=== Precipitation ===
Coropuna lies between the semi-humid Altiplano and the arid western slope of the Andes. Its climate is semi-arid, with precipitation at 6,080 m (19,950 ft) elevation reaching 390 millimetres per year (15 in/year) (Note: Other reported precipitation values range between 700 mm/a (28 in/year) and 1,000 mm/a (39 in/year), the latter referring to the summit of Coropuna.). Lower down the mountain, at altitudes between at 3,000 and 4,000 m (9,800 and 13,100 ft), annual precipitation levels increase to between 226 and 560 mm/a (8.9 and 22.0 in/year) (semi-humid). Even further down, at altitudes around 2,000–3,000 m (6,600–9,800 ft), they decrease again to 98–227 mm/a (3.9–8.9 in/year) (desert). Cold water brought from Antarctica along the Pacific Ocean by the Humboldt Current, the presence of a stable anticyclone and of a temperature inversion over the Pacific, and the Andean rainshadow are all responsible for this dryness.

Most precipitation falls as hail or snow. This happens mostly during the summer wet season, between December and March, when the ITCZ moves south and a summer monsoon is active over South America. Most precipitation is brought by easterly winds coming from the Amazon and the Atlantic Ocean, whereas the westerly winds that dominate during the dry season do not carry much moisture. Thus, humidity generally decreases in a westward direction.

The amount of precipitation is modulated by the El Niño Southern Oscillation. During phases of El Niño, the weather is drier, snow cover smaller and glacier retreat increases. Over longer timespans, precipitation in the region increases whenever iceberg discharge and cooling occur in the North Atlantic. This was the case during the Heinrich events and the Younger Dryas when lakes formed on the Bolivian Altiplano: The Sajsi formed about 25,000–19,000 years ago, Tauca about 18,000–14,000 and Coipasa 13,000–11,000 years ago. Cold periods in the Southern Hemisphere such as the Antarctic Cold Reversal between 14,500 and 12,900 years ago may have pushed the polar front north and increased precipitation as well. That increased precipitation may have delayed the retreat of Coropuna's glaciers after the end of the last glacial maximum. Coropuna experienced moist conditions during the early Holocene, whereas the late Holocene beginning 5,200 years ago was drier there, with a pronounced dry period lasting from 5,200 to 3,000 years ago.

=== Temperature ===
Temperatures decrease with altitude gain, and at lower elevations around 2,000–3,000 m (6,600–9,800 ft) they average 12–17 °C (54–63 °F). Between 3,000 and 4,000 m (9,800 and 13,100 ft) they average 7.8 °C (46.0 °F) and at 4,000–5,200 m (13,100–17,100 ft) elevation they average 0–6 °C (32–43 °F). At altitudes above 5,200 m (17,100 ft) they remain below freezing. Temperatures fluctuate more over daily timescales than over seasonal ones when measured close to the glaciers. Southerly cold waves can sometimes reach Coropuna, leaving traces in ice cores in the form of southern pollen. During the Little Ice Age, at 5,000–5,200 m (16,400–17,100 ft) elevation temperatures decreased to −5 to −7 °C (23 to 19 °F). Warm fluctuations between about 2,200 and 900 years ago, plus a cold fluctuation between around 970 to 1010 AD, are also recorded.

== Vegetation, fauna and agriculture ==
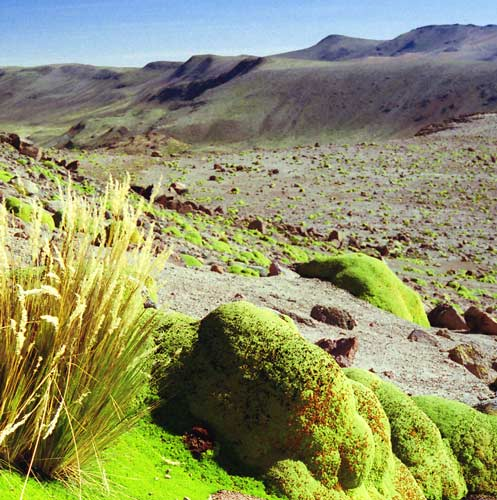
Yareta on Coropuna

Most of the region is covered by puna grassland, with the exception of isolated Polylepis woods to the southwest of the volcano, plus other different vegetation types to the west and southeast. Peat bogs are present on the southern and southwestern sides of Coropuna, and some of these have been drilled to obtain sediment cores. There are several private conservation areas around the volcano. Elsewhere, agriculture is widespread around Coropuna. Insects such as beetles and hymenopterans, birds such as the Andean condor, fish, and mammals such as the alpaca, llama and vicuña occur in the region. Several new species of butterfly have been discovered there.

The mountain has several distinct vegetation belts:

- Between 800 and 2,500 m (2,600 and 8,200 ft) lies steppe vegetation with Ambrosia shrubs and cacti. Irrigation permits the cultivation of garlic, olive, onion, potato, rice, sugar cane and wheat. Pastures are also present.
- The steppe vegetation is also present between 2,500 and 3,500 m (8,200 and 11,500 ft) in the "pre-Puna", but it is denser here and includes shrubs of the family Asteraceae, such as Ambrosia, Diplostephium and Senecio. Crops grown here include alfalfa, but there is also some dairy farming and the planting of eucalyptus and pine trees as a wood supply for the local population.
- Between 3,000 and 4,000 m (9,800 and 13,100 ft) lies a so-called "supra-tropical facies" on soils overlying lava flows. It includes shrubs and thorny vegetation in very wet and very dry areas, respectively. Agriculture is practised here, including the growing of kiwicha, maize, quinoa and vegetables on anthropogenic soils and terraced fields. Dominant natural plants between 3,500 and 4,000 m (11,500 and 13,100 ft) include herbaceous plants of the families Fabaceae and Solanaceae, as well as shrubs of the Asteraceae.
- Between 4,000 and 4,800 m (13,100 and 15,700 ft) vegetation is found in marshes and peat bogs where sufficient water is available, in the form of relic Polylepis woodlands as well as herbaceous puna vegetation which is particularly prolific during the wet season. These areas are used for pasture of alpacas and llamas, and for fishing in wetlands and Polylepis woods; hamlets are found close to wetlands and forests. Plant genera found here include Baccharis, Calamagrostis, Chuquiraga, Festuca, Parastrephia, Senecio and Stipa.
- Above 4,800 m (15,700 ft) lies the so-called "Puna brava", with herbs and deep-rooted plants that have all adapted to withstand permafrost conditions. The cushion plant, yareta, which is used as a fuel source, is the dominant plant in this belt. Other plants from the Apiaceae and Asteraceae also occur. Vegetation, including ichu grass and yareta, exist up to about five km (3.1 mi) elevation; higher elevations are unvegetated.

== Archaeology and religious importance ==
More than 130 archaeological sites lie on Coropuna, especially at the southern and northern bases of the volcano and on its western slope. Among these are funerary towers known as chullpas. Some of these western sites are on the ice cap. Proposals have been made to make the area of Coropuna including these archaeological sites into a protected area.

The coastal regions of Peru were first occupied 11,000 and 9,000 years BC. Evidence of the presence of hunter-gatherers near Coropuna first appear in the archaeological record in the caves of Cavalca and Pintasayoc, respectively north and south of the volcano. In the latter cave, rock paintings interpreted as dating to 7,000 – 3,000 years BC have been found. The first human activity at Coropuna in the Cuncaicha cave north of the volcano began 12,300 – 11,100 years ago, shortly after the final retreat of glaciers from the mountain. The region around the volcano was settled over the last 4,000 years.

=== Inca times ===
A larger number of archaeological sites go back to the 2nd Intermediate Period and during the Inca era. The Inca expanded preexisting irrigation and terrace systems which are in part still existing today. These include the highest irrigation system in the world, which was possibly constructed on Coropuna to allow the cultivation of bitter potatoes. Inca sites are often found at higher elevations than the sites left by preceding civilisations; the highest one is located at 5,700 m (18,700 ft) elevation, and there is evidence of Inca presence to 6,200 m (20,300 ft) elevation. In addition, an important branch of the Inca road system passes by the western foot of Coropuna. The region was densely populated; the close location of the mountains and favourable climatic conditions facilitated its settlement.

As noted by Spanish chroniclers such as Pedro Cieza de León, Coropuna played an important role in Inca religion, and an important temple was situated there, possibly at Maucallacta. Pedro Cieza de León considered Coropuna to be the fifth most important holy site of the Inca empire. One archaeological site on the volcano may have been a stopover for religious ceremonies to its summit. South of Coropuna, the archaeological site of Illomas and its petroglyphs may bear a relationship to the volcano. Capacocha, a form of human sacrifice, were offered to the mountain; reportedly, in 1965, a mummy was found there.

==== Maucallacta and Acchaymarca ====
Among the archaeological sites at Coropuna is the important Inca site of Maucallacta, on the southwestern flank of the mountain. Some of the structures there were built to evoke the appearance of the mountain. A royal residence, an oracle and a political unit were associated with Maucallacta, and the oracle of Coropuna would have answered the rulers' queries all year round. The site drew thousands of pilgrims during festivities, who came to Coropuna to seek advice or make offers to the gods. The Maucallacta site was probably the most important one at Coropuna; the western summit today known as "La Niña" was apparently also significant.

Another important site associated with Coropuna is Acchaymarca, to the west of the mountain, where about 280 Inca stone structures have been found. It is likely that many pilgrims came there for ceremonies honouring the apus of Coropuna and Solimana.

== Mythology, religion and legends ==
In the Inca Empire, Coropuna was a sacred mountain, especially for the people of Cotahuasi. It was regarded as the apu of the southern region, and the second-most important in the cosmology of the Andes. The mountain was considered to be an abode of the dead – a large village where holy people received the souls of the departed, who lived there in the afterlife, and that could be accessed through caves. On the way on to the mountain, the souls are judged for their treatment of domestic animals and kitchen utensils. In Huaquira District mythology, the exhalations of the souls yield underground lakes, which return water to the living. In different mythologies Coropuna is instead the starting point for the deceased on a journey to Surimana. Coropuna and Solimana are often paired. Sometimes Coropuna is seen as a male entity while Solimana volcano is seen as a female one. The mountain is still worshipped today, and local people continue to observe the ancient mortuary rites.

An enduring Franciscan influence from a colonial-era Cusco friary, the "pious among today's Peruvian peasantry" revere a "Flying" St Francis of Assisi, who is believed to await the souls of the dead on top of Coropuna. Other poorly recorded legends are associated with Coropuna. One story narrates how a brother tried to deceive Coropuna and other mountains, and was turned into a deer. Another legend tells of a conflict between Coropuna and other local mountains against an interloping Inca. A third story states that a troupe was transporting precious metals for Coropuna and Solimana when the animal leading it was shot by a hunter; the mountains then castrated the hunter.

== Climbing ==
The archaeological findings made on Coropuna indicate that the Inca may have reached the summit. Annie Peck and Hiram Bingham III each reached a summit of Coropuna in 1911; Peck raised a banner saying "Votes for Women" on the summit she had ascended, which was slightly lower than the one reached by Bingham a little later. This banner action was part of the women's suffrage campaigns that were taking place at that time, and meant to illustrate that women were just as capable as men of physical deeds. Bingham's ascent determined that Coropuna was not the highest summit of South America. Since then, other summits of the mountain have been ascended as well.

The rugged area offers mountaineering opportunities. Coropuna is normally ascended from Laguna Pallarcocha, from where a route along the western rib and glacier slopes leads up to a fore-summit and then to the main summit. Along this way, a high camp can be set up at 5,600–5,800 m (18,400–19,000 ft) elevation. An ascent of Coropuna would normally be a three-day trip, and on the French adjectival climbing scale the route is graded as Facile (F). Pallarcocha itself can be reached from a road that begins in the town of Chuquibamba.
