= List of volcanoes in Peru =

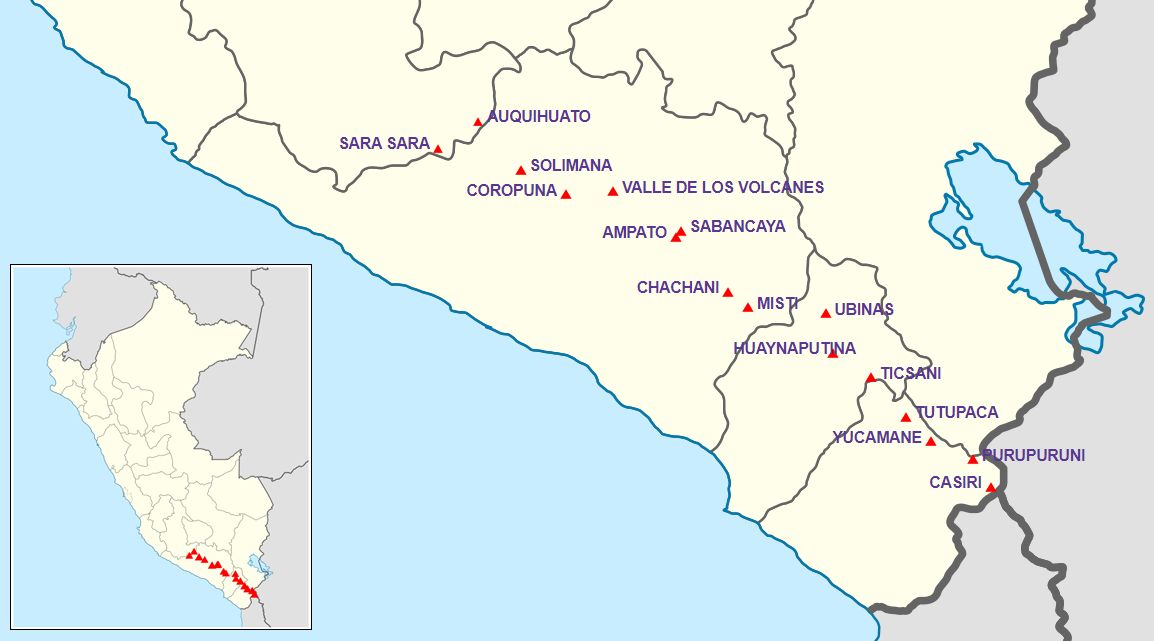
Major volcanoes of Peru

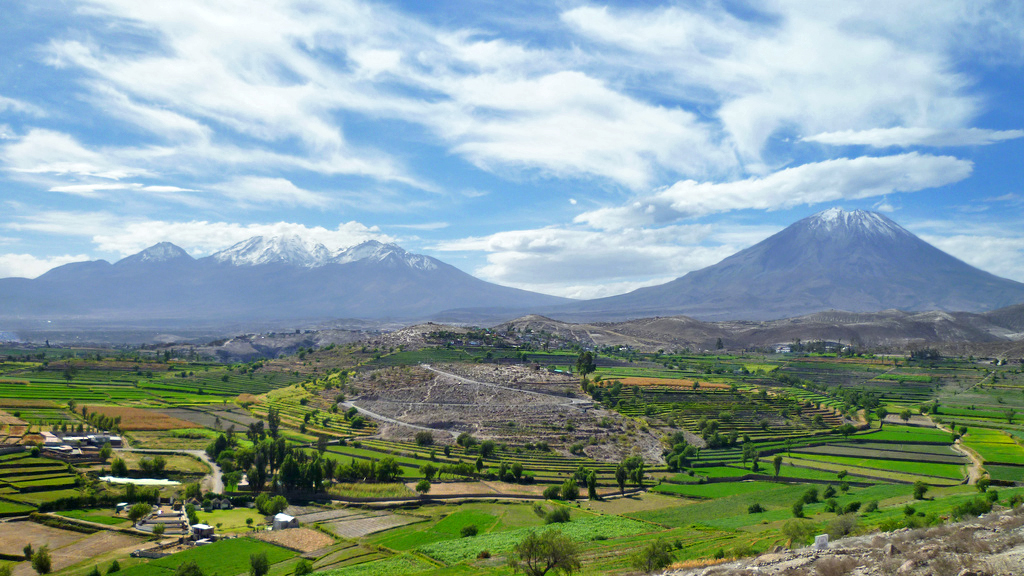
Chachani and Misti

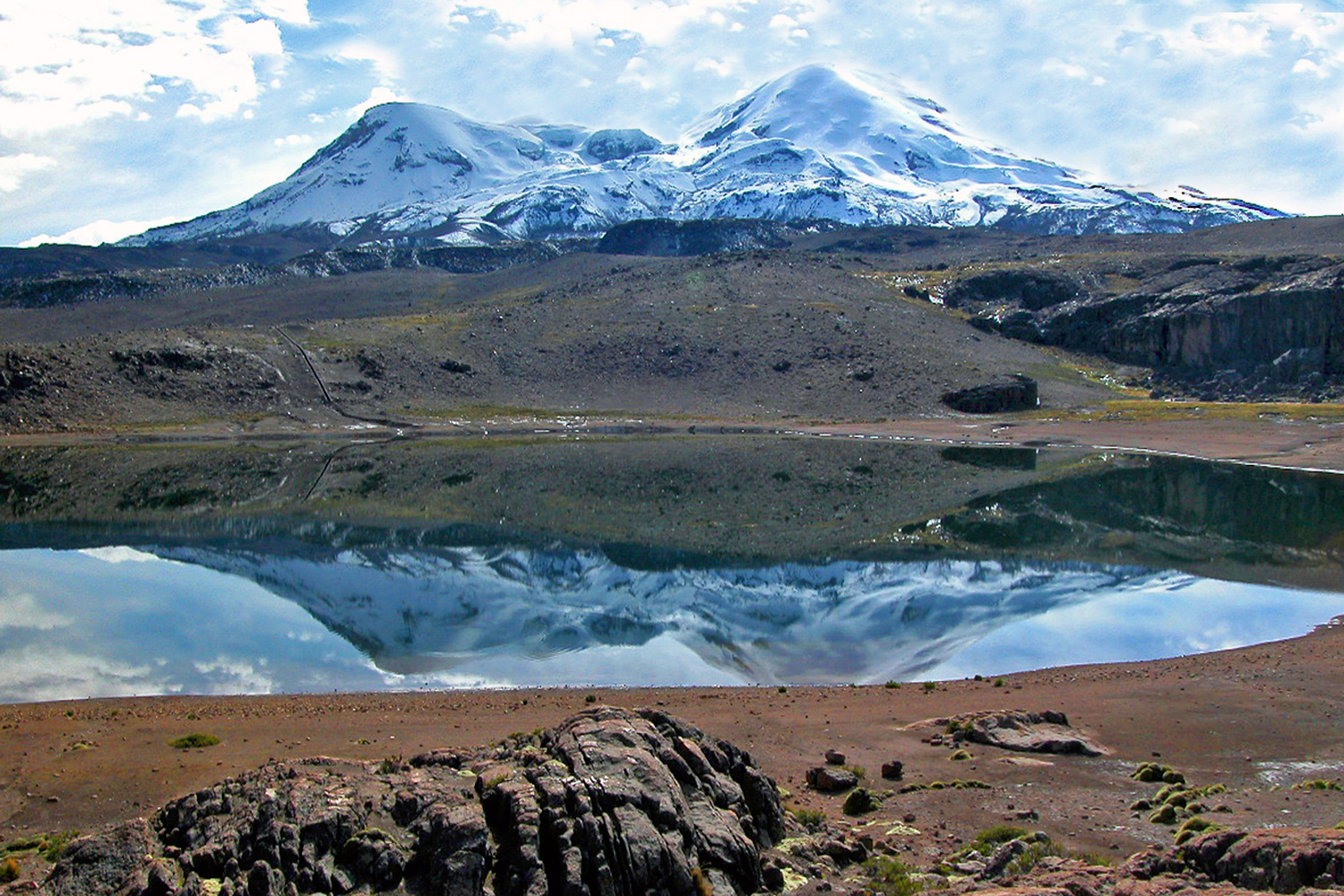
Coropuna

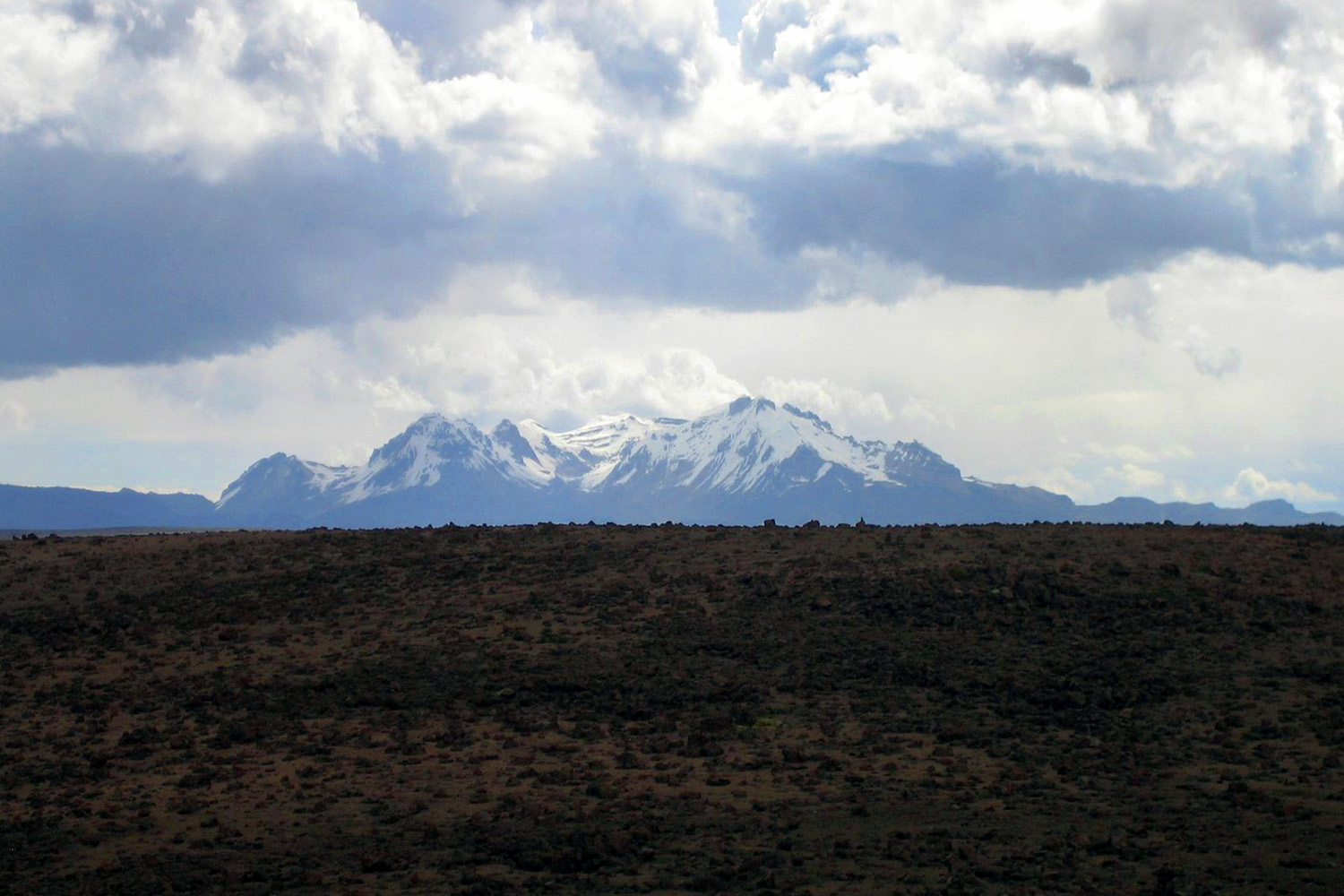
Hualca Hualca

This is a list of active and extinct volcanoes in Peru.

| Name | Elevation | | Location | Last eruption |
| Name | meters | feet | Coordinates | Last eruption |
|---|---|---|---|---|
| Ampato | 6,288 | 20,630 | 15°49′S 71°53′W | - |
| Arichua | 5,150 | 16,896 | 16°36′04″S 70°02′00″W | - |
| Auquihuato | 4,980 | 16,338 | 15.07°S 73.18°W | - |
| Chachani | 6,057 | 19,872 | 16.191°S 71.530°W | Holocene |
| Cerro Nicholson | 2,524 | 8,282 | 16.261°S 71.754°W | Unknown |
| Chilcayoc | 3,347 | 10,981 | 15°31′27″S 72°18′46″W | - |
| Chilcayoc Grande | 3,243 | 10,640 | 15°32′10″S 72°17′17″W | - |
| Coropuna | 6,425 | 21,079 | 15.52°S 72.65°W | Holocene |
| Huambo volcanic field | | | 15.83°S 72.13°W | 700 BCE ± 50 |
| Firura | 5,498 | 18,038 | 15.23°S 72.63°W | Holocene |
| Jechapita | 3,388 | 11,115 | 15°32′05″S 72°18′39″W | - |
| Quinsachata | 3,700 | 12,139 | 14°09′56″S 71°21′21″W | 4450 BCE |
| Macusani | | | | Pliocene |
| Misti | 5,822 | 19,101 | 16.294°S 71.409°W | 1985 |
| Pichu Pichu | 5,564 | 18,255 | 16.44°S 71.23°W | - |
| Puca Mauras | 4,955 | 16,257 | 15°27′13″S 72°13′49″W | - |
| Puca Mauras (Andagua) | 4,262 | 13,983 | 15°25′33″S 72°20′19″W | - |
| Ccarhuarazo | 5,112 | 16,772 | 14°19′55″S 73°45′25″W | - |
| Jenchaña | 3,600 | 11,800 | 15°31′13″S 72°20′44″W | - |
| Casiri | 5,650 | 18,537 | 17.47°S 69.813°W | Holocene |
| Sabancaya | 5,967 | 19,577 | 15.78°S 71.85°W | 2017 |
| Sara Sara | 5,522 | 18,117 | 15.33°S 73.45°W | - |
| Solimana | 6,093 | 19,990 | 15°24′36″S 72°53′35″W | - |
| Ticsani | 5,408 | 17,743 | 16.755°S 70.595°W | - |
| Tutupaca | 5,815 | 19,078 | 17.025°S 70.358°W | - |
| Ticsho | 3,860 | 12,664 | 15°29′05″S 72°22′43″W | - |
| Ubinas | 5,672 | 18,609 | 16.355°S 70.903°W | 2008 |
| Hualca Hualca | 6,025 | 19,767 | 15°49′S 71°53′W | - |
| Huaynaputina | 4,850 | 15,912 | 16.608°S 70.85°W | 1600 |
| Yanamauras | 3,761 | 12,339 | 15°29′02″S 72°21′06″W | - |
| Yucamane | 5,550 | 18,208 | 17.18°S 70.20°W | 1902 |
