= Corryocactus volcanicus =

Scientific classification
- Kingdom: Plantae
- Clade: Tracheophytes
- Clade: Angiosperms
- Clade: Eudicots
- Order: Caryophyllales
- Family: Cactaceae
- Subfamily: Cactoideae
- Genus: Corryocactus
- Species: C. volcanicus

Binomial name
- Corryocactus volcanicus A.Pauca & Hoxey

Species of plant

Corryocactus volcanicus is a species of succulent flowering plant in the genus Corryocactus, within the family Cactaceae. It is endemic to the department of Arequipa in southern Peru.

== Description ==
Corryocactus volcanicus is a species of large, shrubby cactus that may also develop a columnar growth form. It can grow to 3 m in height. It branches from the base and forms erect stems measuring 10-12 cm in diameter. The epidermis is light green in color.

The stems have 7-10 ribs, which are raised by 2.2-2.8 cm. The circular areoles, which measure 0.9-1.9 cm in diameter and are separated by 2.1-3 cm, are found on top of the ribs. The older areoles have a grayish felt-like covering, while the younger areoles have a black felt-like covering with a small brown tuft pointing towards the rib, as well as small, yellow-green, deltoid scales.

Plant in flower

This species has 12-17 spines per areole, although the basal areoles of the trunk may produce up to 50. The central and radial spines are practically indistinguishable. Their surfaces are smooth, and they are generally straight, although they occasionally may appear slightly curved. They reach 0.6-10.5 cm in length. The new spines are yellow, with a yellowish base and a brownish apex throughout development, even as the rest of the spine turns gray with age.

The flowers open during the day, and are radially symmetrical and funnel-shaped. They often develop in a subapical position and are an almost-white shade of light yellow in color. They grow to 7.2-7.7 in length and 5-5.3 in diameter when open. The pericarpel is greenish and measures 1.6-2.4 cm in length and 2.1-2.7 cm in diameter. It is covered in dark green deltoid scales measuring 0.7-2.9 mm in length. On these are rounded areoles measuring 1.6-2.4 mm in diameter, with a brownish-black felt-like covering and a few off-white curly trichomes. Each areole has 3 straight spines that are yellowish and 3-4 mm in length.

The ovary is off-white in color and measures 9-10 mm in width. The style is off-white, cylindrical, glabrous, short, and thick, measuring 1.3-1.4 cm in length and 4-5 mm in diameter. The stigma has 20-24 yellowish lobes, which measure 1-1.3 cm in length and are papillose on the surface. The nectary is situated at the base of the style. The stamens are numerous and grow from near the base of the style. Their filaments are glabrous and light yellow in color, growing to 0.9-1.4 cm in length. The anthers are yellowish, basifixed, and laterally-dehiscent, measuring approximately 2 mm in length. The external tepals are glabrous and greenish, with acute, brownish, and apiculate apices. The internal tepals are glabous, spathulate, and very light yellow, with dentate margins and apiculate, light pink apices. The tepals grow to 1.6-3.3 cm in length and 3-10 mm in width.

The fruit is globose in shape and grows to approximately 7.5 cm in diameter. The pericarp is yellow-green and the pulp is translucent and sour in flavor. The areoles on the fruits retain their blackish felt-like covering and develop 27-33 thin, flexible, and yellowish spines that grow up to 2 cm in length.

The seeds are brown-black in color, widely oval-shaped and asymmetrical. They measure 1.76-1.95 mm in length, 1.20-1.35 mm in thickness, and 0.65-0.98 mm in width. They are covered by a mucilage sheath, and have dull, rough surfaces. The margin of the testa is expanded towards the hilum, and the cells gradually decrease in size in this direction. These cells are isodiametric and have channeled, anticlinal margins. The micropyle and the hilum occupy the same region, although they are separated by a band of sclerenchyma tissue. The hilo-micropylar region measures 0.5-0.79 mm in length.

=== Similar species ===
Corryocactus volcanicus exhibits morphological similarities to Corryocactus brevistylus and Corryocactus brachypetalus, although it may be distinguished from both of these species by a combination of floral, reproductive, and ecological characteristics.

With respect to C. brevistylus, the primary difference is the very light yellow color and smaller size of the flowers of C. volcanicus, as well as the flexible spines on the fruits, which on C. brevistylus are rigid. Furthermore, its seeds are smaller and have a shorter micropylar region. Although these two species are found within 24 km of one another, C. volcanicus is geographically isolated by mountain ranges exceeding 5000 m in altitude.

With respect to C. brachypetalus, C. volcanicus may be distinguished, again, by its very light yellow flowers, compared to the orange-yellow to reddish flowers of C. brachypetalus. Furthermore, the spines on the fruits are flexible, while those on the fruits of C. brachypetalus are rigid. The seeds of C. brachypetalus are black, as opposed to blackish-brown. Ecologically speaking, the two species occupy different habitats: C. brachypetalus inhabits coastal hills, while C. volcanicus inhabits pre-Andean scrublands at higher altitudes. The distributions of the species are separated by a distance of approximately 120 km and an altitude of approximately 2300 m.

== Distribution and habitat ==
Corryocactus volcanicus is endemic to Valle de los Volcanes, in the district of Andagua in southern Peru's Arequipa department. It is found in the drainage basin of the Andagua River. It has been recorded from the localities of Andagua, Chachas, Sucna, Chipchane, and Nahuira, as well as along the road leading to Ayo.

It primarily inhabits desert and dry scrubland biomes at altitudes of 2700 to 3800 meters above sea level. It grows in sandy or rocky soils, often associated with volcanic scoria, on flat areas and hill slopes. It shows a preference for leeward slopes, where the conditions are more favorable for its establishment.

In some locations, it can reach high densities and form large stands known as "cactus forests". In these environments, it shares its habitat with diverse species that are characteristic of the pre-Andean xerophytic scrublands.

== Taxonomy ==
Corryocactus volcanicus was described by the botanists Anthony Pauca and Paul Hoxey, who published this name in the scientific journal Phytotaxa 733: 283 in 2025.

Etymology

- Corryocactus: the genus name honors Thomas Avery Corry (1862-1942), an engineer for the Peruvian railway company Ferrocarril del Sur, who helped to discover these plants - the first three described species of this genus grew near the newly-constructed railway. De hecho, las primeras tres especies conocidas del género crecían cerca de la recién construida vía férrea. Furthermore, the Latin term cactus refers to plants in the family Cactaceae.
- volcanicus: the specific epithet refers to the Valle de los Volcanes of Andagua, in the Peruvian department of Arequipa, where this species is found.

== Conservation status ==
Under the proposed assessment for the IUCN Red List, Corryocactus volcanicus could be classified as being Endangered (EN), signifying that this species faces a very high risk of extinction in the wild if the current factors threatening it continue to affect its populations and habitat.

The main threats to this species' survival are related to mining and forest fires caused by human activity, both of which occur in its native habitat. Furthermore, climate change causes additional stress due to the increased frequency of extreme climactic events such as prolonged droughts or floods.
