= Minasniyuq (Castilla) =

Mountain in Peru

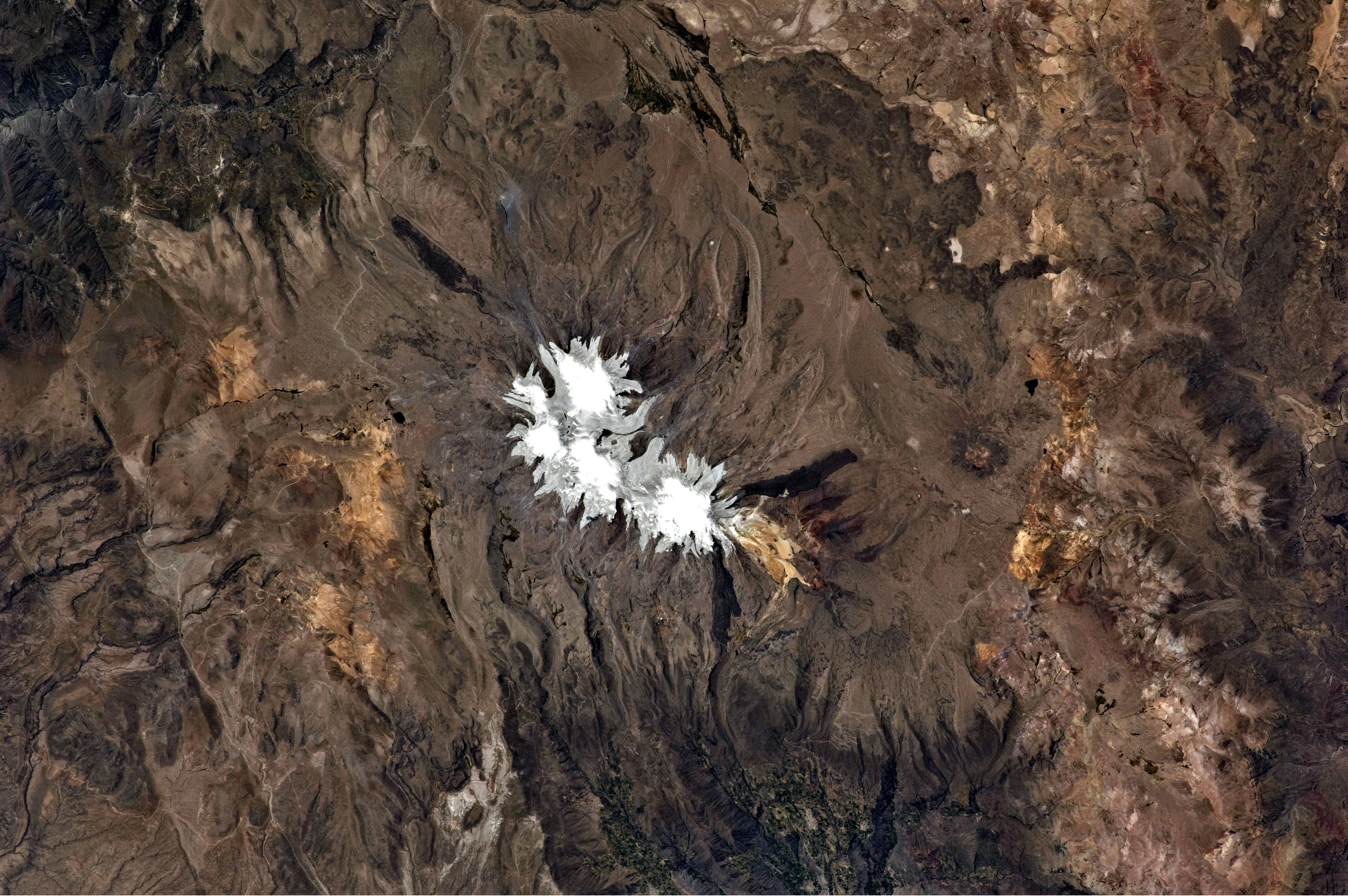
- Coropuna (snow-covered) and Minasniyuq (to the right) as seen from the ISS (north is to the upper right part of this image)

Highest point
- Elevation: 4,800 m (15,700 ft)
- Coordinates: 15°30′03″S 72°28′46″W

Geography
- Location within Peru
- Location: Peru, Arequipa Region, Castilla Province
- Parent range: Andes

Minasniyuq (Spanish minas mines, Quechua -ni, -yuq suffixes, "the one with mines", hispanicized spelling Minasnioc) is a mountain in the Andes of Peru, about 4,800 metres (15,748 ft) high. It is located in the Arequipa Region, Castilla Province, Andagua District. Minasniyuq lies south of Wakapallqa, southwest of Llallawi and southeast of Puma Ranra. It is situated at the Q'illu Q'illu valley (Jellojello).
