= P'isqi P'isqi =

Mountain in Peru

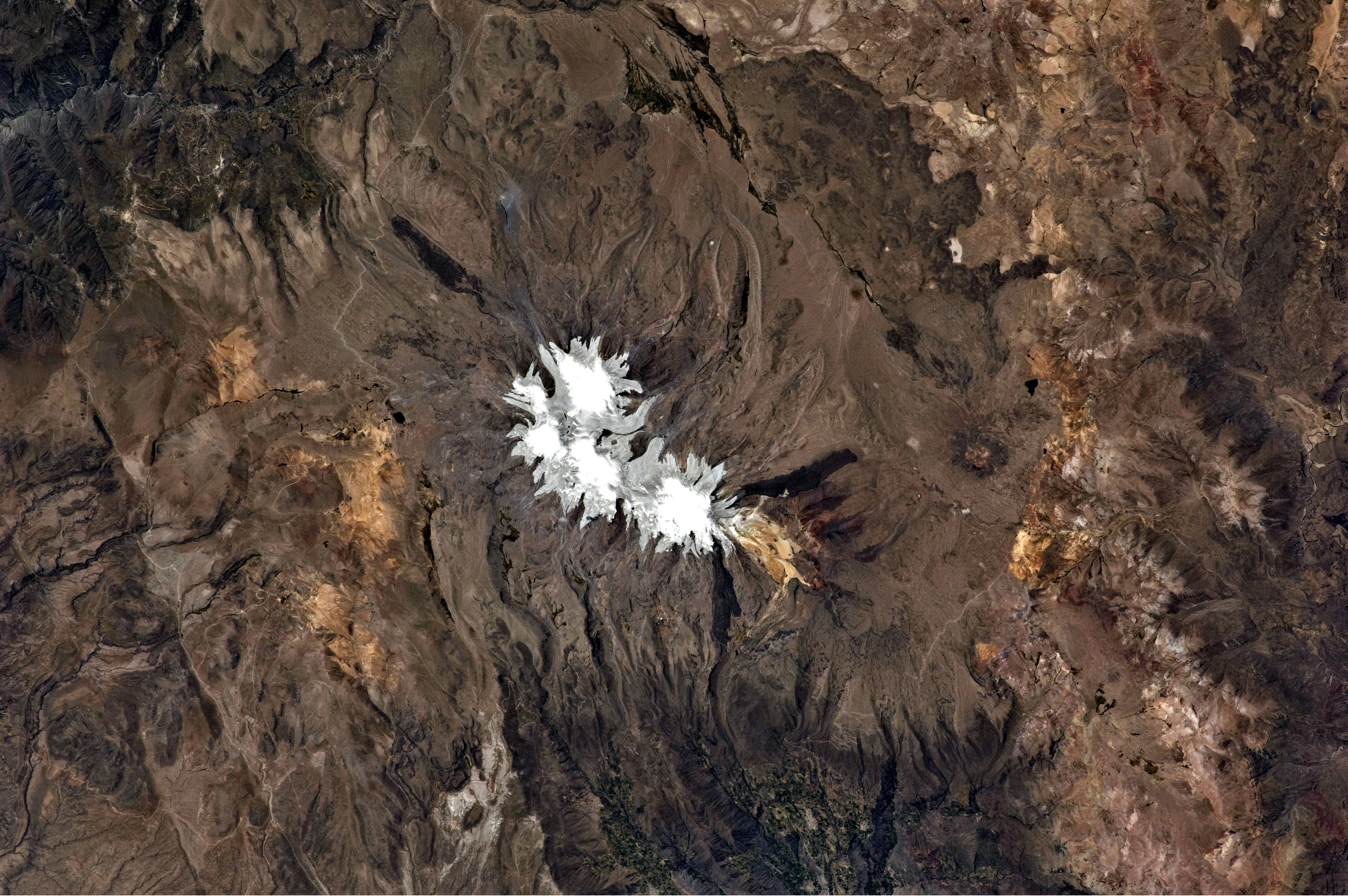
- Coropuna (snow-covered) and P'isqi P'isqi (to the right) as seen from the ISS (north is to the upper right part of this image)

Highest point
- Elevation: 4,600 m (15,100 ft)
- Coordinates: 15°28′21″S 72°26′50″W

Geography
- Location within Peru
- Location: Peru, Arequipa Region, Castilla Province
- Parent range: Andes

P'isqi P'isqi (Aymara p'isqi white quinoa, Quechua p'isqi a stew or purée of quinua, the reduplication indicates that there is a group or a complex of something, Hispanicized spelling Pesjepesje) is a mountain in the Andes of Peru, about 4,600 metres (15,092 ft) high. It lies in the Arequipa Region, Castilla Province, Andagua District. P'isqi P'isqi is situated west of Wakapallqa and Llallawi.
