= Minasniyuq =

Minasniyuq (Spanish minas mines, Quechua -ni, -yuq suffixes, "the one with mines", Hispanicized spellings Minasnioc, Minasnioj, Minasniyoc) may refer to:

- Minasniyuq (Arequipa-Cusco), a mountain on the border of the Arequipa Region and the Cusco Region, Peru
- Minasniyuq (Castilla), a mountain in the Castilla Province, Arequipa Region, Peru
- Minasniyuq (Caylloma), a mountain in the Caylloma Province, Arequipa Region, Peru
- Minasniyuq (Cusco), a mountain in the Cusco Region, Peru
