= Puca Mauras (Andagua-Chilcaymarca) =

Mountain in Peru

- Location within Peru

Highest point
- Elevation: 4,262 m (13,983 ft)
- Coordinates: 15°25′33″S 72°20′19″W

Geography
- Location: Peru, Arequipa Region
- Parent range: Andes, Chila

Puca Mauras (possibly from Quechua puka red) is a volcano in the Andes of Peru, about 4,262 metres (13,983 ft) high. It is situated at the "Valley of the Volcanoes" in the Arequipa Region, Castilla Province, on the border of the districts of Andagua and Chilcaymarca. Puca Mauras lies in the western extensions of the Chila mountain range, northeast of the Ticsho and Yanamauras volcanoes.
