= P'aqu Urqu (Arequipa) =

Mountain in Peru

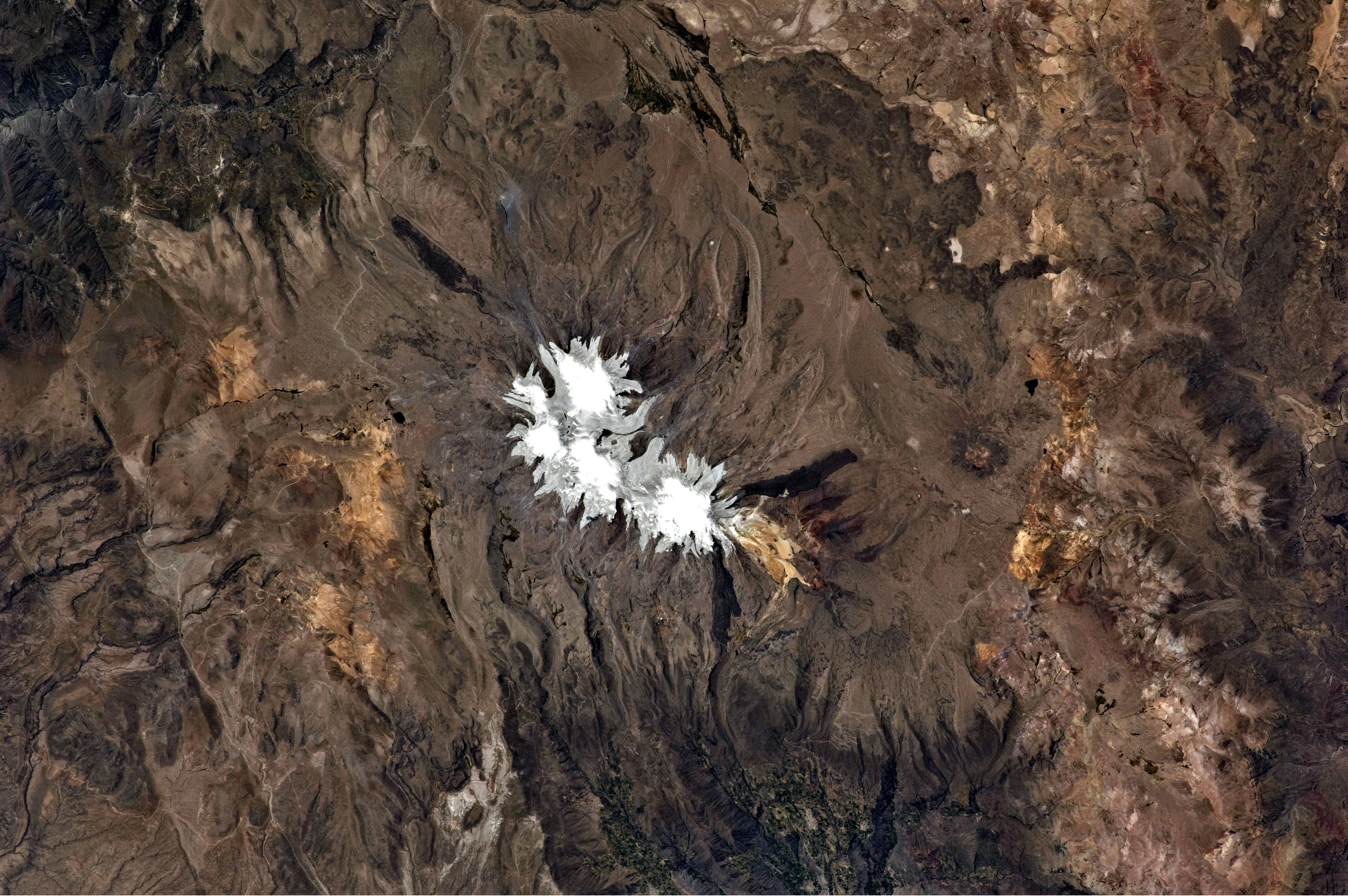
- Coropuna (snow-covered) and P'aqu Urqu (lower right edge of this image) as seen from the ISS (north is to the upper right)

Highest point
- Elevation: 5,000 m (16,000 ft)
- Coordinates: 15°35′25″S 72°21′37″W

Geography
- Location within Peru
- Location: Peru, Arequipa Region, Castilla Province
- Parent range: Andes

P'aqu Urqu (Quechua p'aqu blond, fair, a color similar to gold, urqu mountain, "'blond' or slightly golden mountain", Hispanicized spelling Pacoorcco) is a mountain in the Andes of Peru, about 5,000 metres (16,404 ft) high. It is located in the Arequipa Region, Castilla Province, in the south of the Andagua District. P'aqu Urqu lies north-west of Yanawara and north of Huch'uy Yanawara ("little Yanawara", Hispanicized Uchuy Yanahuara).

== See also ==
- Qullpa
- Yanqha
