= Chilcayoc Grande =

Mountain in Peru

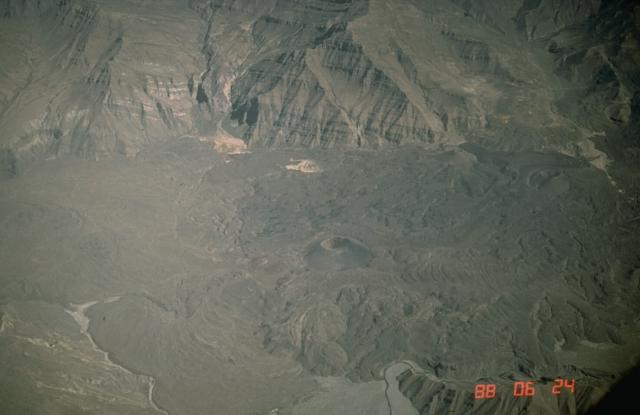
- The "Valley of the Volcanoes" as seen from above with the volcanoes Chilcayoc and Jechapita (on the right, in the background), Chilcayoc Grande (in the center) and Chachas Lake (on the bottom)

Highest point
- Elevation: 3,243 m (10,640 ft)
- Coordinates: 15°32′10″S 72°17′17″W

Geography
- Location within Peru
- Location: Peru, Arequipa Region
- Parent range: Andes

Chilcayoc Grande (possibly from Quechua ch'illka baccharis, -yuq a suffix to indicate possession, "the one that has got baccharis" or "the one with baccharis", Spanish grande large) is a volcano in the Andes of Peru, about 3,243 metres (10,640 ft) high. It is situated in the "Valley of the Volcanoes" in the Arequipa Region, Castilla Province, Andagua District. Chilcayoc Grande lies south-west of the Chachas Lake and south-east of the volcanoes Chilcayoc and Jechapita (3,388 m).
