= Andagua District =

Coordinates: 15.4891°S 72.3389°W

Andagua Antawa
- District
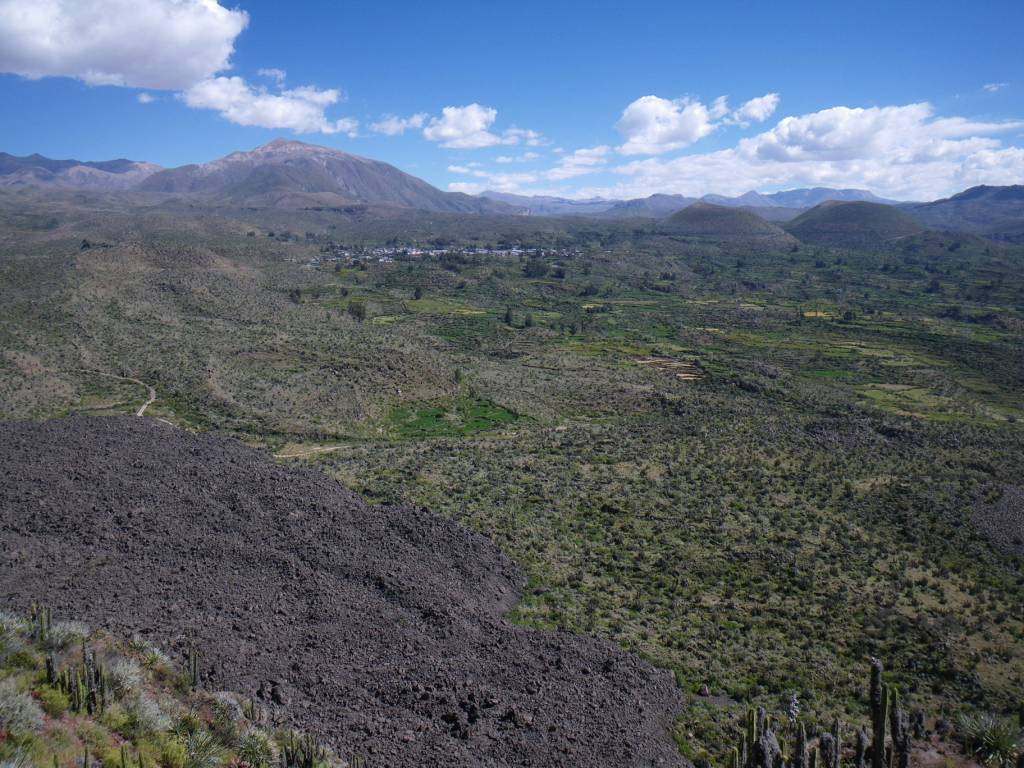
- The "Valley of the Volcanoes" as seen from Antaymarka, looking north-west: the volcano T'iksu (on the left), Yana Mawras (on the right) and the village Andagua (Antawa) in the center
- Interactive map of Andagua
- Country: Peru
- Region: Arequipa
- Province: Castilla
- Capital: Andagua

Government
  - Mayor: Santiago Juan Aguilar Herrera

Area
  - Total: 480.74 km^{2} (185.61 sq mi)
- Elevation: 3,587 m (11,768 ft)

Population (2005 census)
  - Total: 1,251
  - Density: 2.602/km^{2} (6.740/sq mi)
- Time zone: UTC-5 (PET)
- UBIGEO: 040402

Andagua District is one of fourteen districts of the province Castilla in Peru.

== Geography ==
Some of the highest mountains of the district are listed below:

- Ch'illkayuq
- Ch'illkayuq Grande
- Hich'apita
- Llallawi
- Mama Wasi
- Minasniyuq
- Misawana
- Puka Mawras
- Puka Saywa
- Puma Ranra
- P'aqu Urqu
- P'isqi P'isqi
- Qallwa
- Qillqani
- Qinchaña
- Tawqa
- T'iksu
- Usqullu
- Wakapallqa
- Yana Mawras
- Yanawara
