= Jenchaña =

Mountain in Peru

- Location within Peru

Highest point
- Elevation: 3,600 m (11,800 ft)
- Coordinates: 15°31′13″S 72°20′44″W

Naming
- Language of name: Quechua

Geography
- Location: Peru, Arequipa Region
- Parent range: Andes
- Topo map

Jenchaña (possibly from Aymara Qinchaña, for to surround with bushes) is a volcano in the Andes of Peru, about 3,600 m (11,800 ft) high. It is situated in the "Valley of the Volcanoes" in the Arequipa Region, Castilla Province, Andagua District. Jenchaña lies northwest of Chilcayoc.
