= Llallawi =

Mountain in Peru

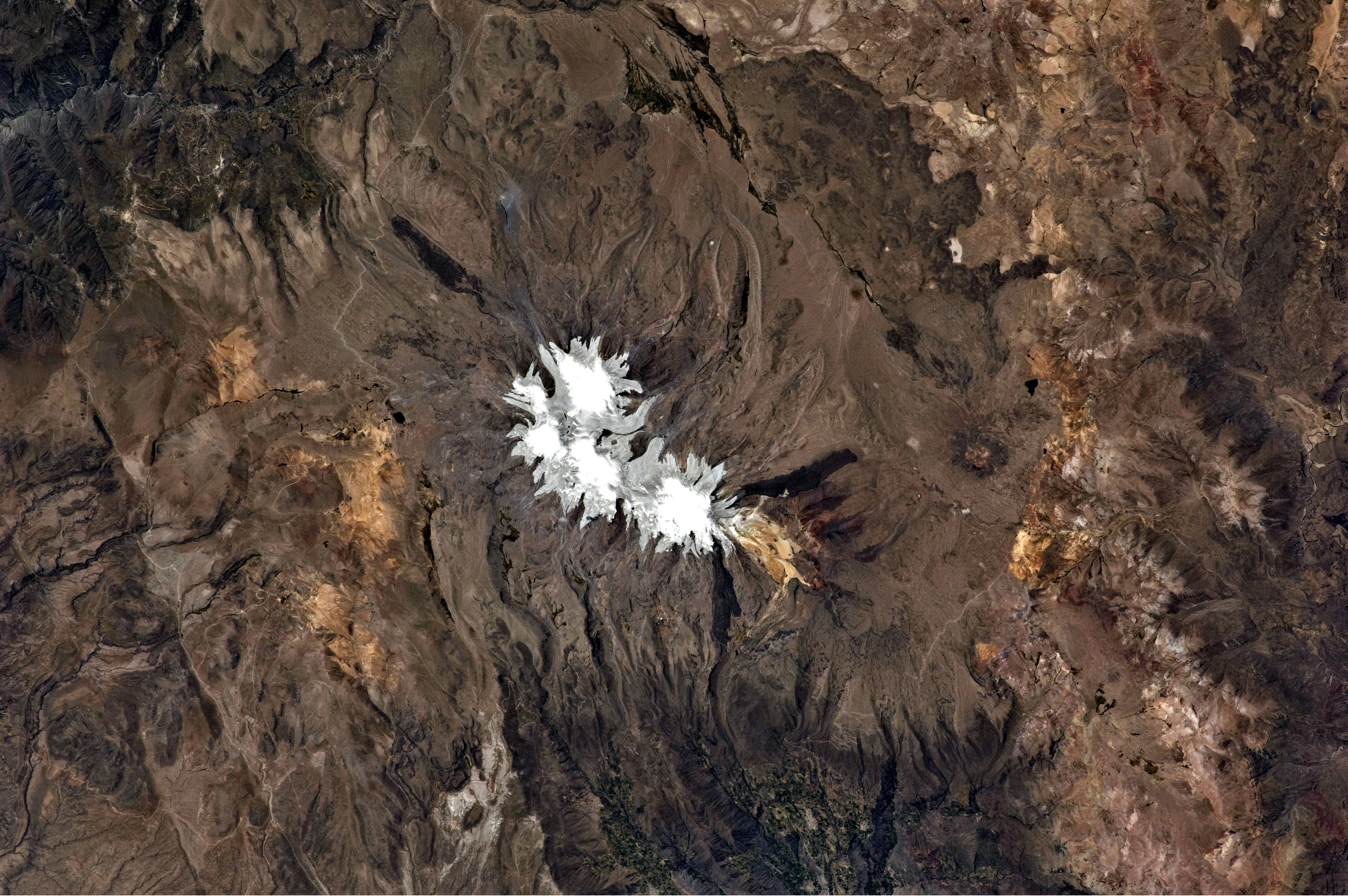
- Coropuna (snow-covered) and Llallawi (to the right) as seen from the ISS (north is to the upper right part of this image)

Highest point
- Elevation: 5,000 m (16,000 ft)
- Coordinates: 15°28′00″S 72°27′39″W

Geography
- Location within Peru
- Location: Peru, Arequipa Region, Castilla Province
- Parent range: Andes

Llallawi (Quechua for a very big potato of singular appearance which used to be elected as a sacrificial offering for divinities, hispanicized spelling Llallahue) is a mountain in the Andes of Peru, about 5,000 metres (16,404 ft) high. It is located in the Arequipa Region, Castilla Province, Andagua District. Llallawi lies west of Wakapallqa and southeast of Usqullu.
