= Chilcaymarca District =

Coordinates: 15.2855°S 72.3783°W

Chilcaymarca Ch'illkaymarka
- District
- Interactive map of Chilcaymarca
- Country: Peru
- Region: Arequipa
- Province: Castilla
- Founded: October 29, 1923
- Capital: Chilcaymarca

Government
  - Mayor: Jaime Angel Ramos Chuquitaype

Area
  - Total: 181.37 km^{2} (70.03 sq mi)
- Elevation: 3,850 m (12,630 ft)

Population (2005 census)
  - Total: 576
  - Density: 3.18/km^{2} (8.23/sq mi)
- Time zone: UTC-5 (PET)
- UBIGEO: 040405

Chilcaymarca District is one of fourteen districts of the province Castilla in Peru.

== See also ==
- Puka Mawras
