= Qallwa (Andagua) =

Mountain in Peru

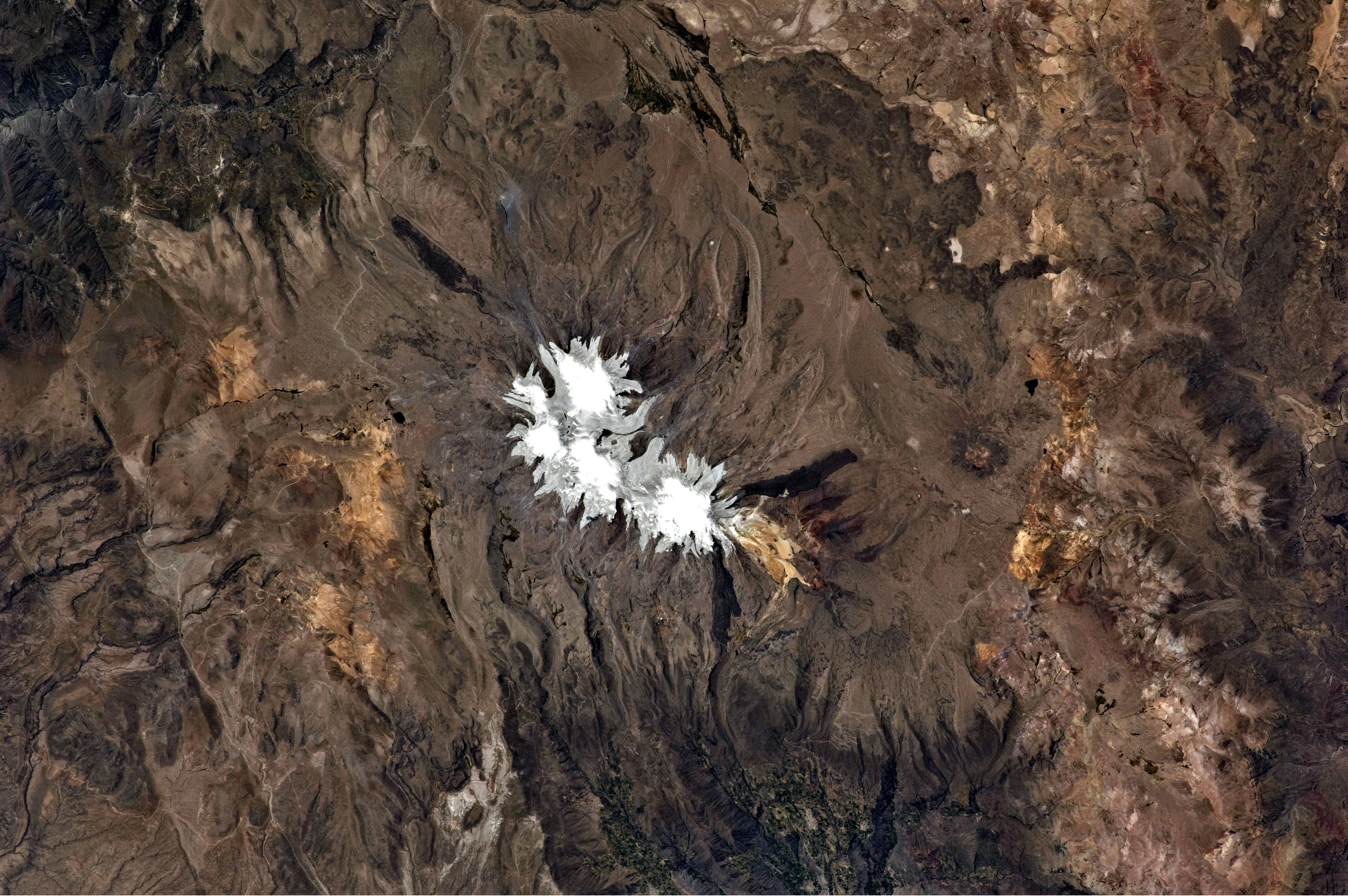
- Coropuna (snow-covered) and Qallwa (to the right) as seen from the ISS (north is to the upper right part of this image)

Highest point
- Elevation: 5,110 m (16,770 ft)
- Coordinates: 15°30′49″S 72°26′38″W

Naming
- Language of name: Quechua

Geography
- Location within Peru
- Location: Peru, Arequipa Region
- Parent range: Andes

Qallwa (Quechua for a little branch, also for an instrument out of wood or bones which the weavers use to press the threads of the cloth, Hispanicized spelling Jallhua) is a 5,110-metre-high (16,765 ft) mountain in the Andes of Peru. It is located in the Arequipa Region, Castilla Province, Andagua District.
