= Jechapita =

Mountain in Peru

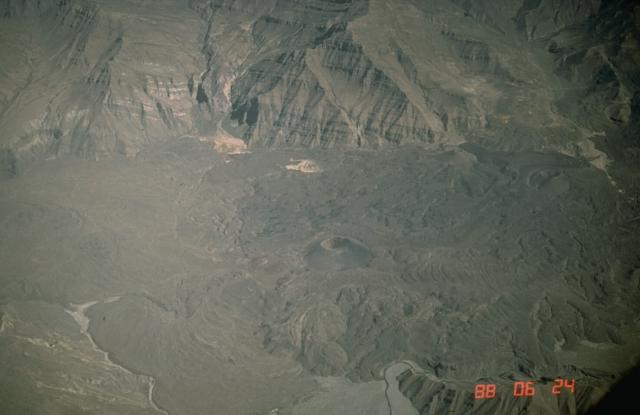
- The "Valley of the Volcanoes" as seen from above with the volcanoes Chilcayoc and Jechapita (on the right, in the background), Chilcayoc Grande (in the center) and Chachas Lake (on the bottom)

Highest point
- Elevation: 3,388 m (11,115 ft)
- Coordinates: 15°32′05″S 72°18′39″W

Geography
- Location within Peru
- Location: Peru, Arequipa Region
- Parent range: Andes

Jechapita (possibly from Quechua Hich'apita) is a volcano in the Andes of Peru, about 3,388 metres (11,115 ft) high. It is situated in the "Valley of the Volcanoes" in the Arequipa Region, Castilla Province, Andagua District. Jechapita lies west of the Chachas Lake and north-west of the volcano Chilcayoc Grande and south of the volcano Chilcayoc.
