= Yanawara (Arequipa) =

Mountain in Peru

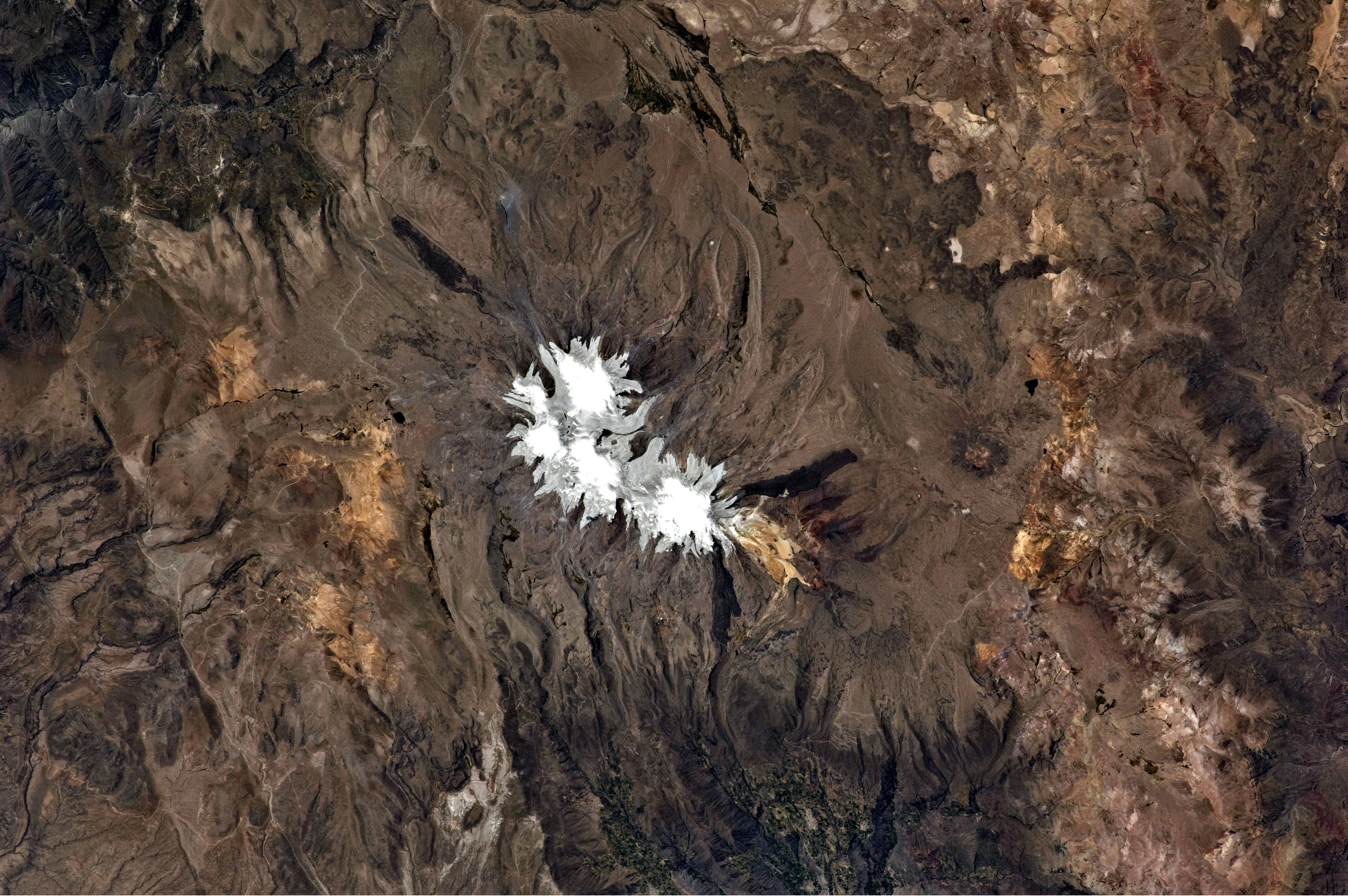
- Coropuna (snow-covered) and Yanawara (lower right rim of this image) as seen from the ISS (north is to the upper right)

Highest point
- Elevation: 5,267.2 m (17,281 ft)
- Coordinates: 15°35′53″S 72°23′28″W

Geography
- Location within Peru
- Location: Peru, Arequipa Region, Castilla Province
- Parent range: Andes

Yanawara (Quechua yana black, wara trousers, "black trousers", Hispanicized spelling Yanahuara) is a mountain in the Andes of Peru, about 5,267.2 metres (17,281 ft) high. It is located in the Arequipa Region, Castilla Province, on the border of the districts Andagua, Ayo and Machaguay. Yanawara lies south-west of P'aqu Urqu and north of Qullpa, Yanqha and Yana Urqu (Quechua for "black mountain", Hispanicized Yana Orcco).
