= Machaguay District =

Coordinates: 15.6486°S 72.5080°W

Machaguay Machaqway
- District
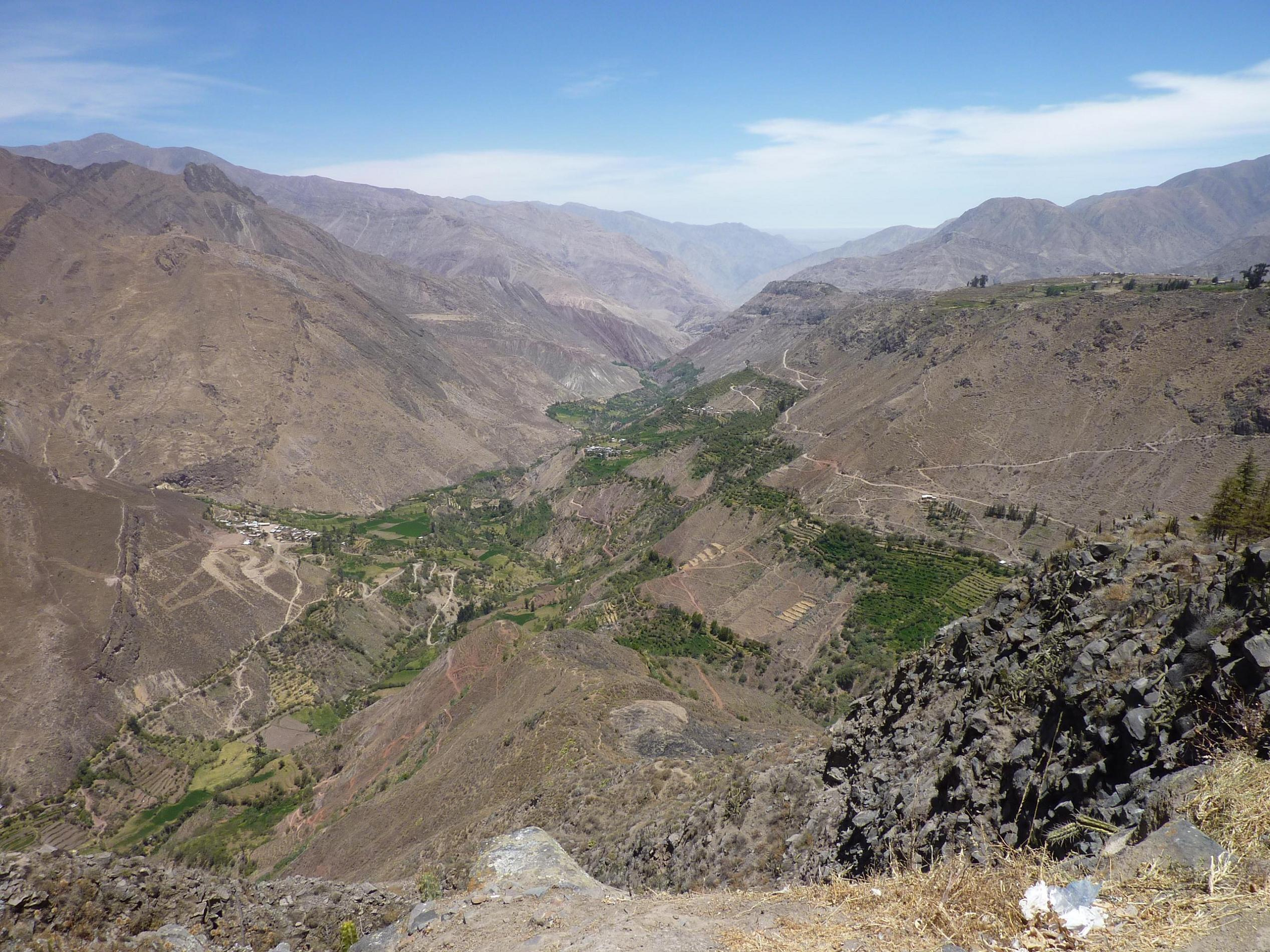
- Interactive map of Machaguay
- Country: Peru
- Region: Arequipa
- Province: Castilla
- Founded: November 4, 1889
- Capital: Machaguay

Government
  - Mayor: Luis Enrique Eusebio Del Carpio

Area
  - Total: 246.89 km^{2} (95.32 sq mi)
- Elevation: 3,150 m (10,330 ft)

Population (2005 census)
  - Total: 967
  - Density: 3.92/km^{2} (10.1/sq mi)
- Time zone: UTC-5 (PET)
- UBIGEO: 040408

Machaguay District is one of fourteen districts of the province Castilla in Peru.

== See also ==
- Yanawara
