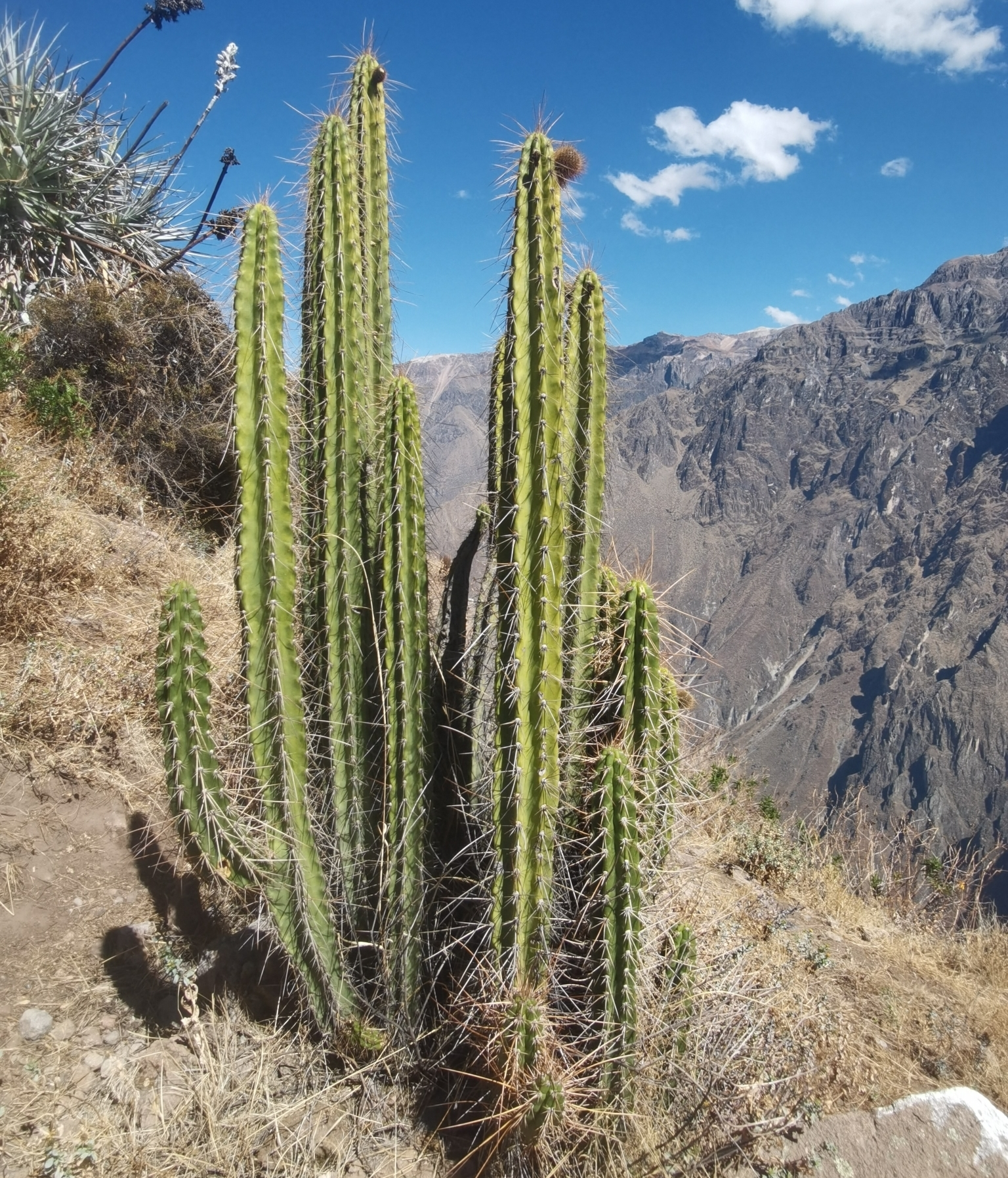

Conservation status
- Least Concern (IUCN 3.1)

Scientific classification
- Kingdom: Plantae
- Clade: Tracheophytes
- Clade: Angiosperms
- Clade: Eudicots
- Order: Caryophyllales
- Family: Cactaceae
- Subfamily: Cactoideae
- Genus: Corryocactus
- Species: C. brevistylus

Binomial name
- Corryocactus brevistylus (K. Schum. ex Vaupel) Britton & Rose 1920

Synonyms
- Cereus brevistylus K.Schum. 1913; Corryocactus brevispinus Rauh & Backeb. 1956 publ. 1957; Corryocactus brevistylus subsp. puquiensis (Rauh & Backeb.) Ostolaza 1998; Corryocactus brevistylus var. puquiensis (Rauh & Backeb.) F.Ritter 1981; Corryocactus krausii Backeb. 1956 publ. 1957; Corryocactus pachycladus Rauh & Backeb. 1956 publ. 1957; Corryocactus puquiensis Rauh & Backeb. 1956 publ. 1957

= Corryocactus brevistylus =

Species of cactus

Corryocactus brevistylus or is a species of columnar cactus found in Peru. It is most noteworthy for its exceptionally long and formidable spines, up to ten inches (25 centimeters) in length.

== Description ==
This species reaches 2 to 5 meters in height with erect, dark to yellowish-green stems that are 12 to 15 cm in diameter. Its prominent feature is its 6 to 8 well-defined ribs, each bearing large, circular, raised areoles. Initially orange-brown, these areoles mature to gray and are spaced 2 to 4 cm apart. The spines are needle-shaped and uniform, lacking clear differentiation into central and radial types. They are typically yellow to reddish-brown, fading with age, and number around 15 per areole. Shorter spines on the periphery range from 0.3 to 3 cm, while the 2 to 4 central spines are significantly longer, measuring 4 to 10 cm but potentially up to 24 cm. Its funnel-shaped, yellow flowers, measuring 8 to 11 cm long and up to 10 cm in diameter, bloom during the day and are odorless. They emerge laterally on the stems and feature a floral tube densely covered with narrow, grayish-green scales and grayish felt. The flowers have inward-bent stamens, short styles, and a highly branched stigma. The fruits are large, round, and yellowish-green, with a diameter of 7 to 10 cm. Initially covered in numerous spines that are shed upon ripening, they contain a juicy pulp with oval, brown seeds.

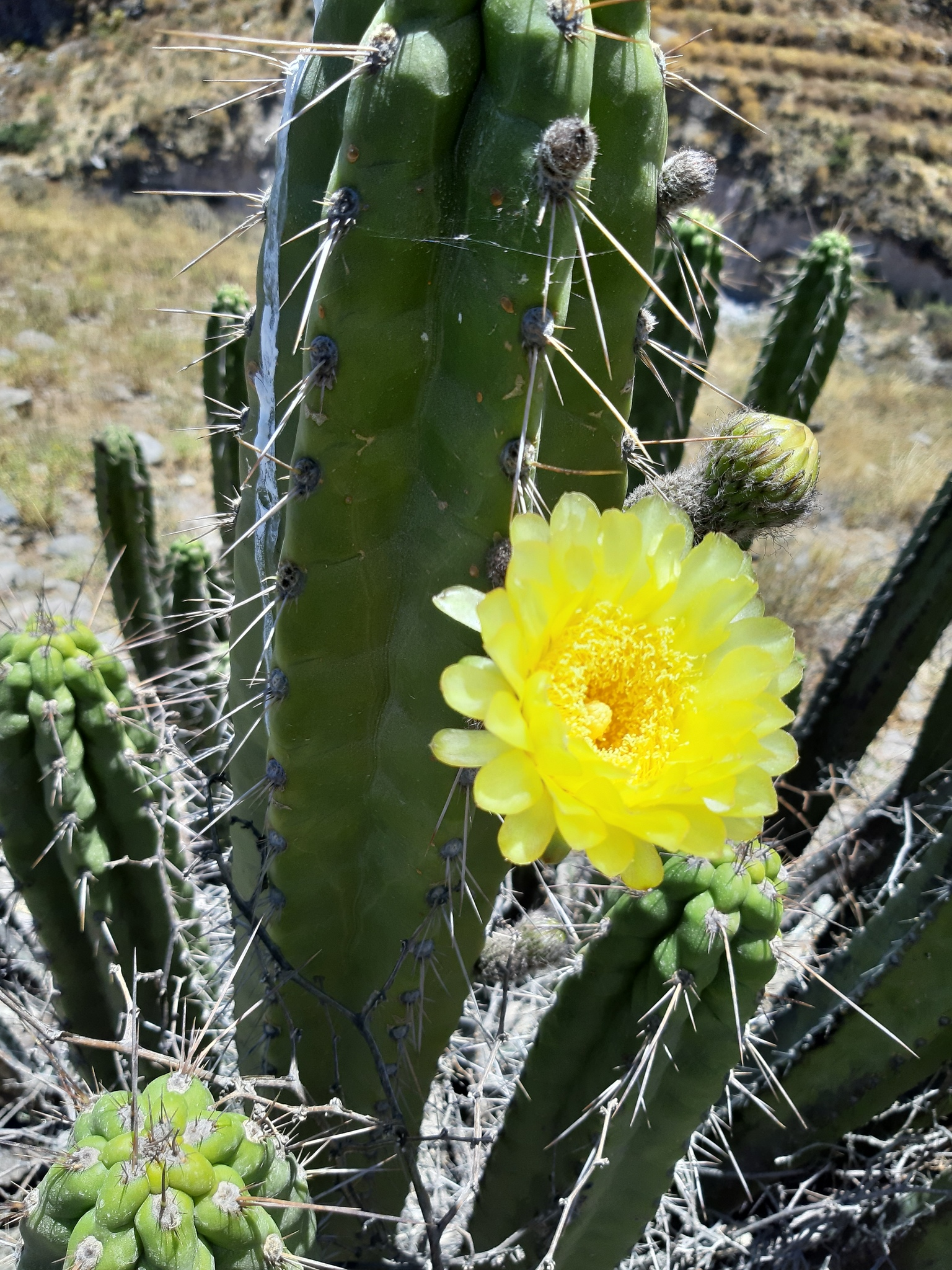
Flower

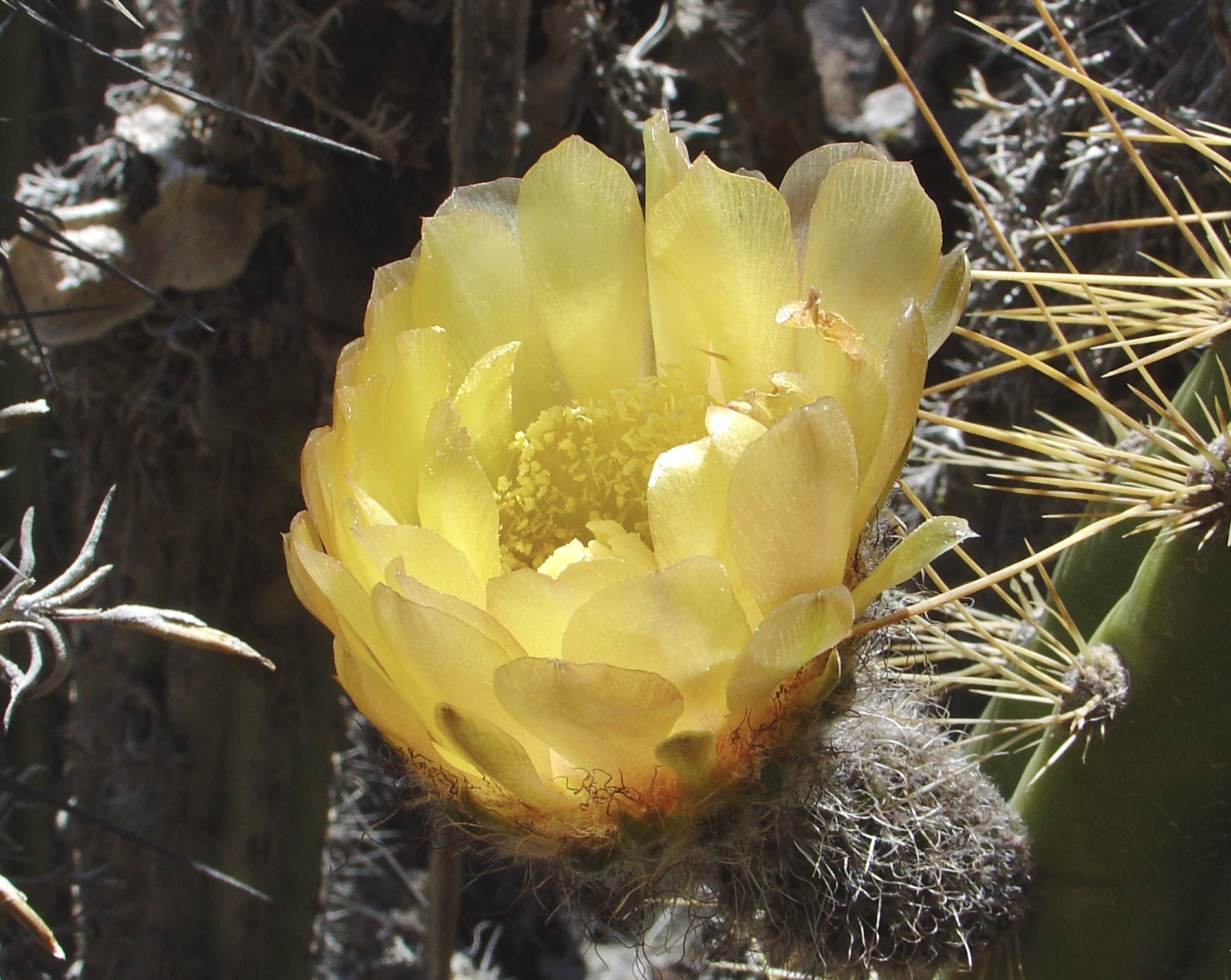
Flower close up

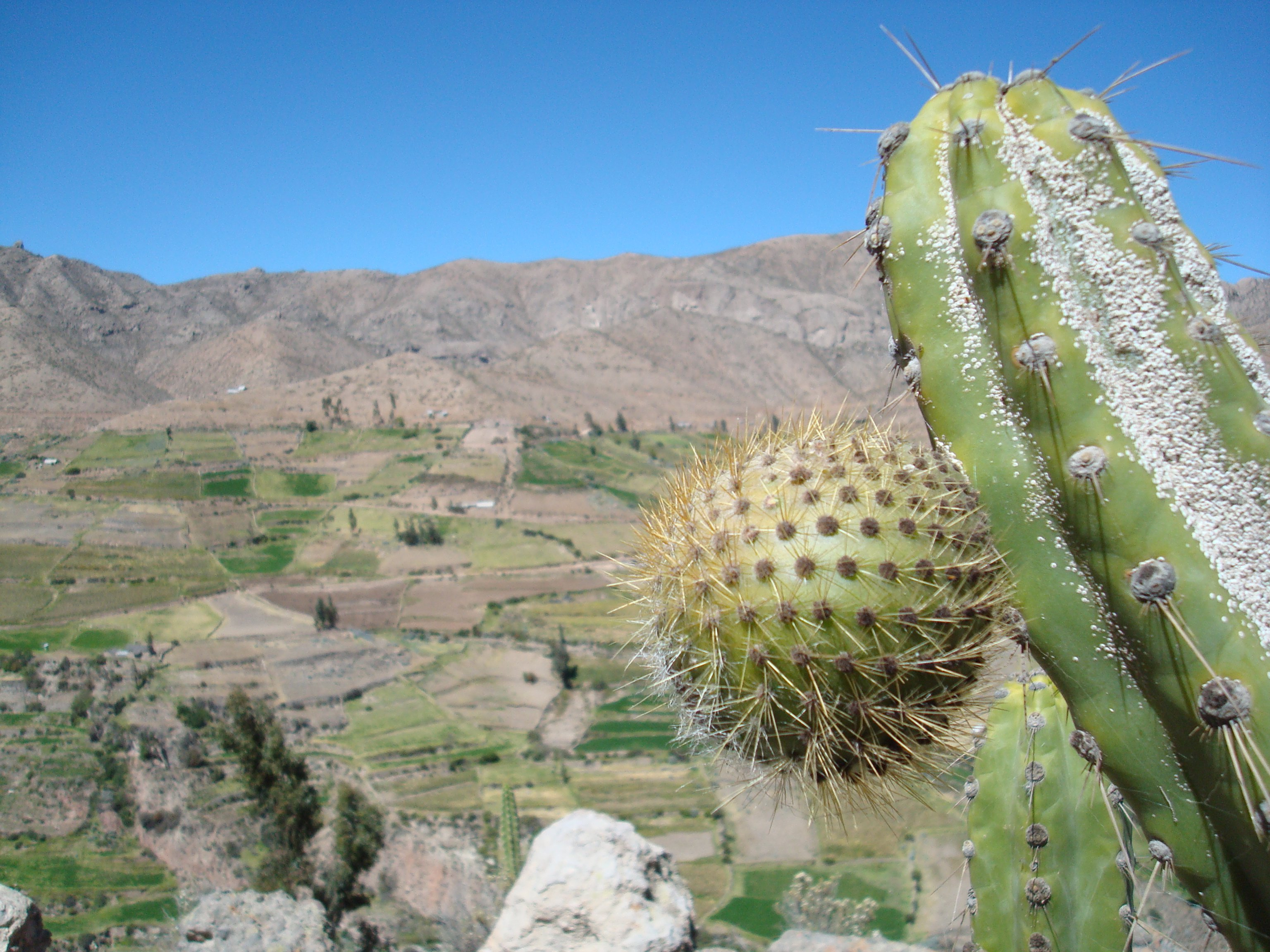
Fruit on plant

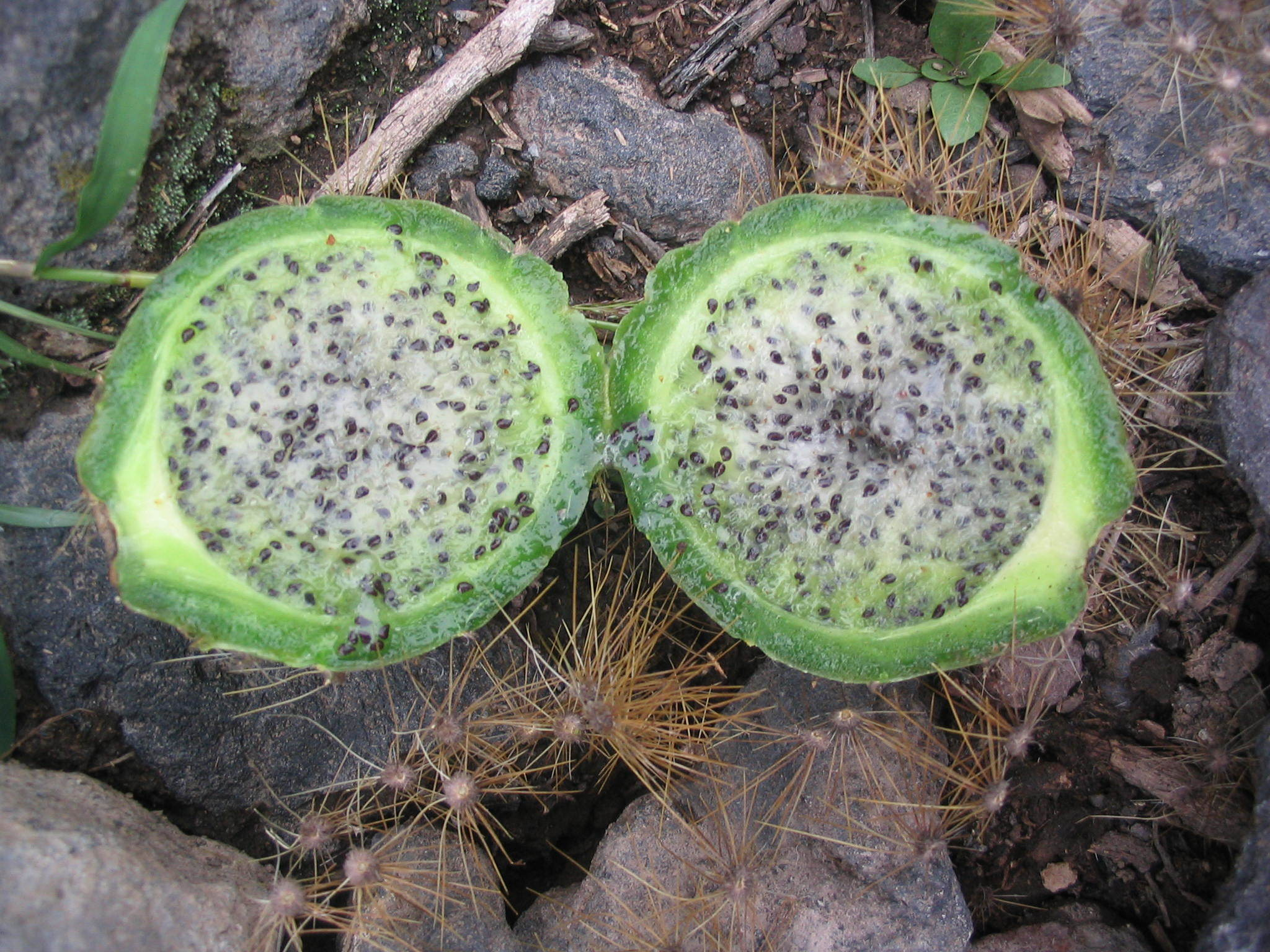
Fruit cross section

== Distribution ==
Corryocactus brevistylus is a shrubby cactus native to the inter-Andean valleys of southern Peru and northern Chile, thriving in desert and dry scrubland biomes. It prefers arid, stony, sandy, and rocky hillsides between 2,000 and 3,600 meters in elevation, tolerating minimal water and moisture, and temperatures below 10°C. The fruits are a food source for guanacos, aiding in seed dispersal. Tillandsia usneoides (Spanish moss) can grow on Corryocactus brevistylus. While not parasitic, it can shade the cactus, potentially reducing fruit production.

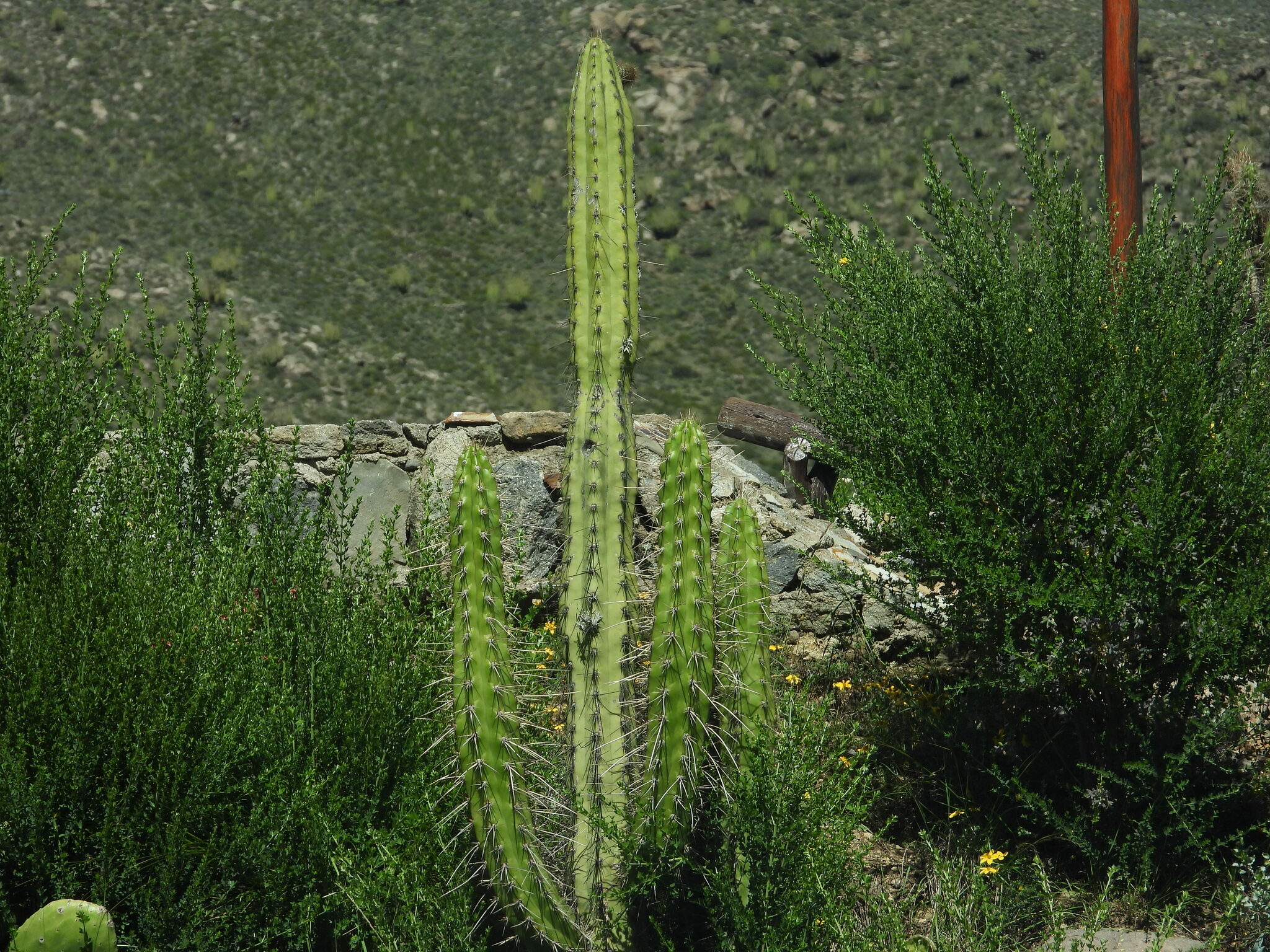
Habitat in Pinchollo, Peru

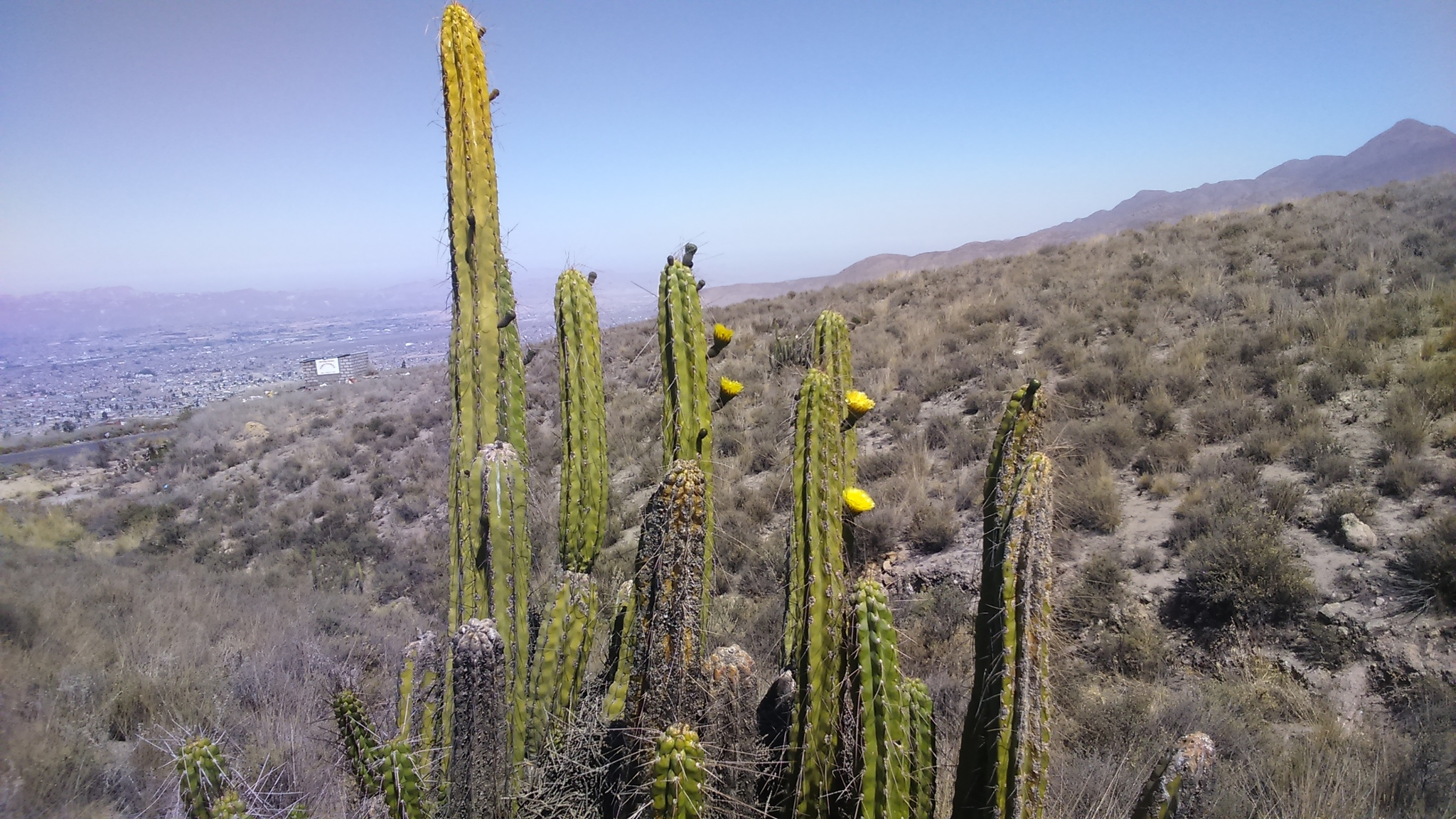
Blooming plant in Cerro Colorado, Peru

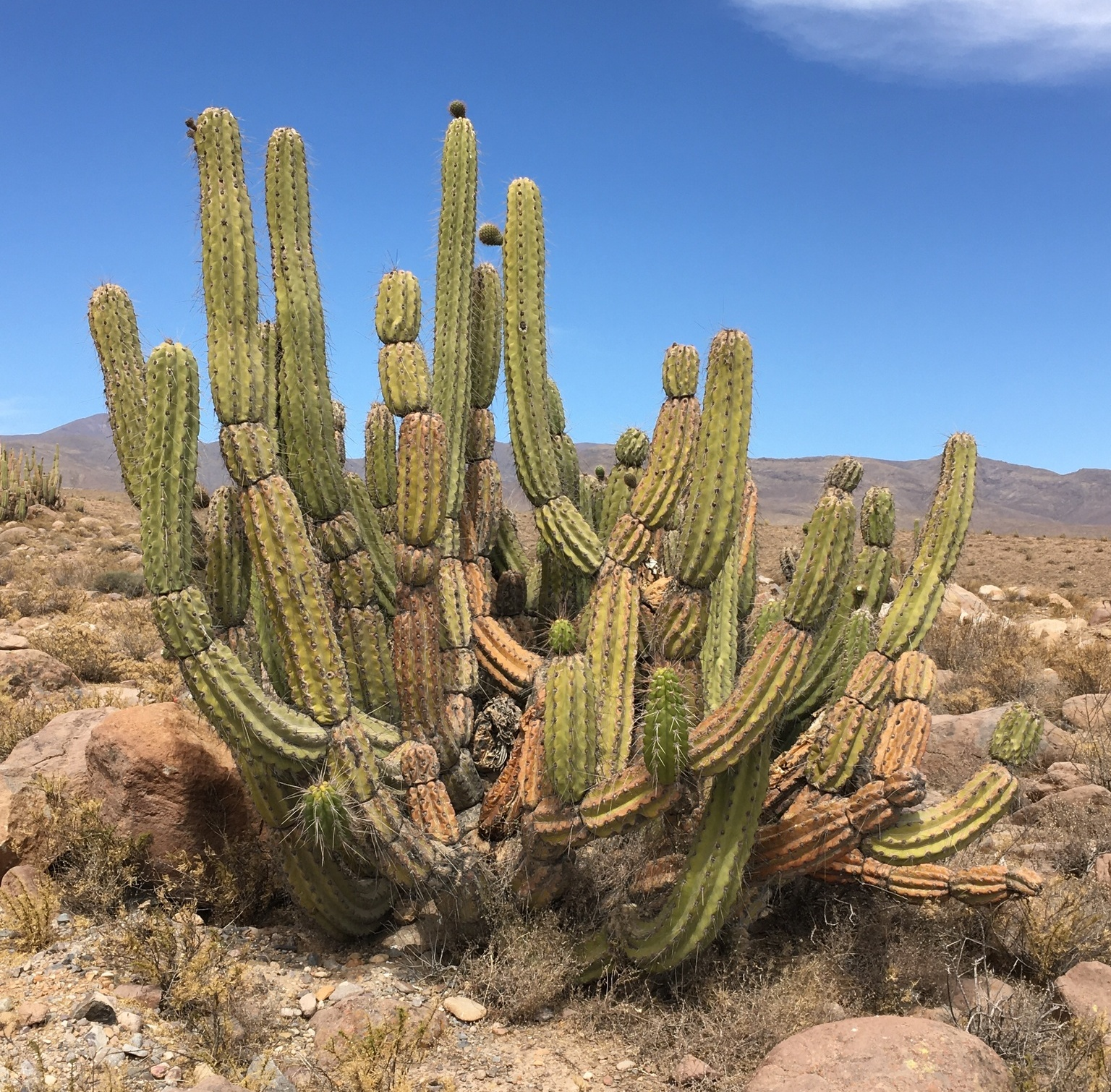
Adult plant in Usmagama, Huara, Chile

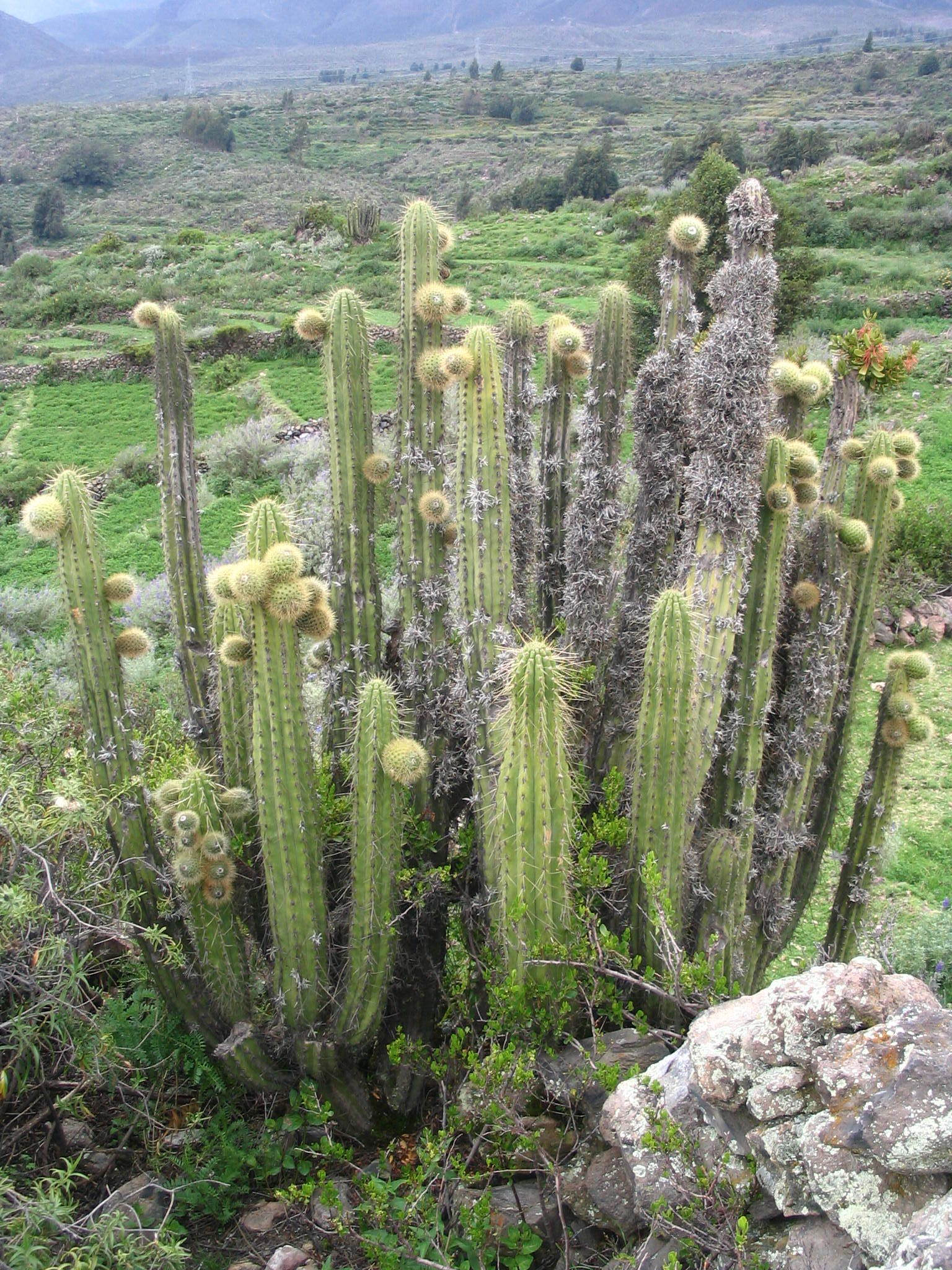
Fruiting plant in Andagua, Peru

== Taxonomy ==
This species was first described as Cereus brevistylus in 1913 by Karl Moritz Schumann and Friedrich Karl Johann Vaupel in Botanische Jahrbücher für Systematik, Pflanzengeschichte und Pflanzengeographie 111: 17. In 1920, Nathaniel Lord Britton and Joseph Nelson Rose moved it to the genus Corryocactus, resulting in its current scientific name, Corryocactus brevistylus. The specific epithet "brevistylus" comes from the Latin words brevis ("short") and stylus ("style"), referencing the flower's characteristically short style.
