= Chilcayoc =

Mountain in Peru

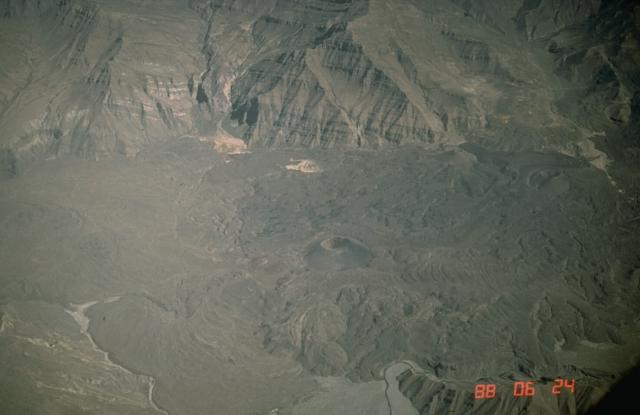
- The "Valley of the Volcanoes" as seen from above with the volcanoes Chilcayoc and Jechapita (on the right, in the background), Chilcayoc Grande (in the center) and Chachas Lake (on the bottom)

Highest point
- Elevation: 3,347 m (10,981 ft)
- Coordinates: 15°31′27″S 72°18′46″W

Geography
- Location within Peru
- Location: Peru, Arequipa Region
- Parent range: Andes

Chilcayoc (possibly from Quechua ch'illka baccharis, -yuq a suffix to indicate possession, "the one that has got baccharis" or "the one with baccharis") is a volcano in the Andes of Peru, about 3,347 metres (10,981 ft) high. It is situated in the "Valley of the Volcanoes" in the Arequipa Region, Castilla Province, Andagua District. Chilcayoc lies west of the Chachas Lake and north of the volcano Jechapita.

South-east of Chilcayoc and Jechapita there is another volcano named Chilcayoc Grande which is 3,243 metres (10,640 ft) high.
