= Puma Ranra (Castilla-Condesuyos) =

Mountain in Peru

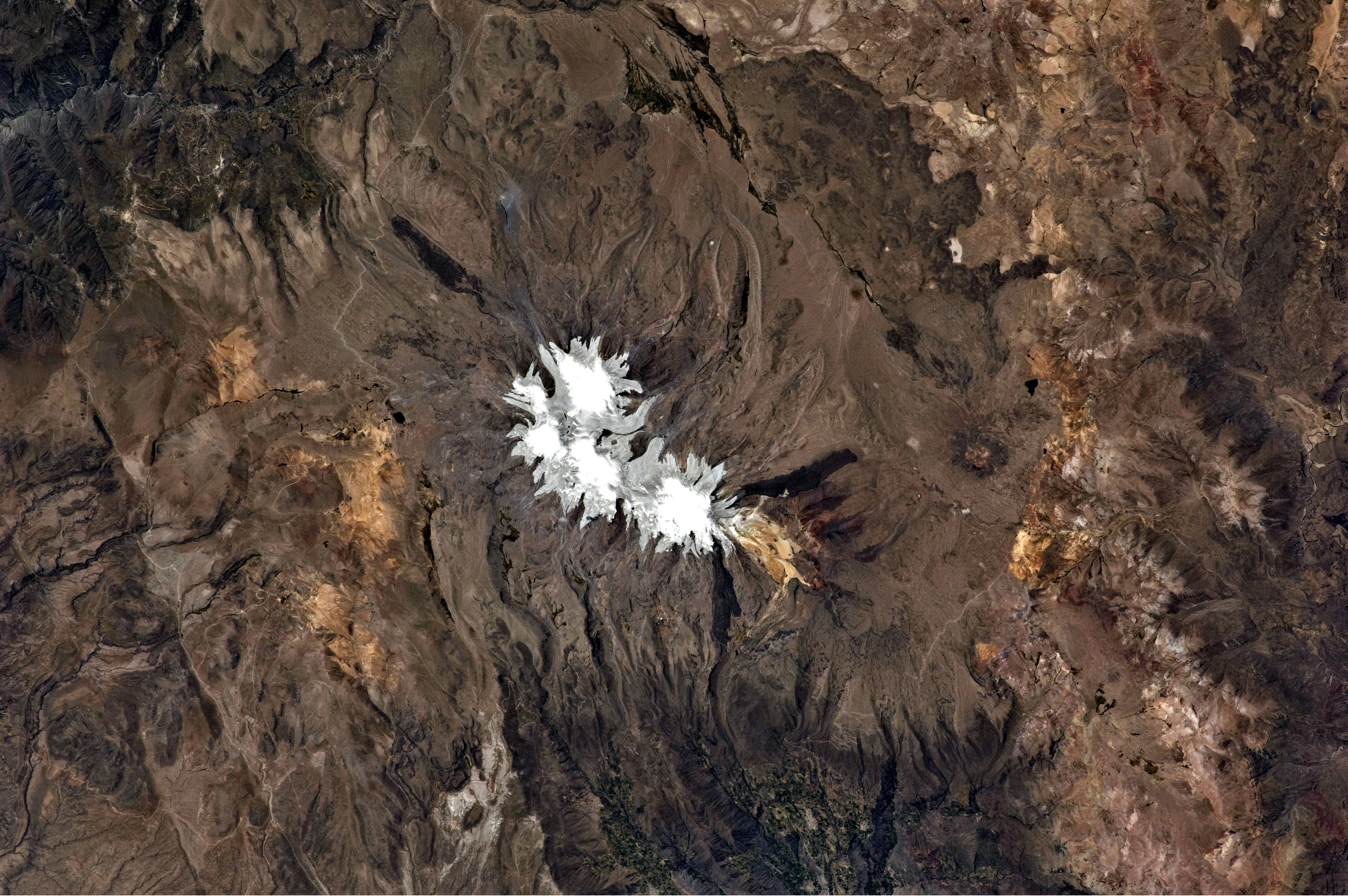
- Coropuna (snow-covered) and Puma Ranra (to the right) as seen from the air

Highest point
- Elevation: 5,000 m (16,000 ft)
- Coordinates: 15°29′10″S 72°30′30″W

Geography
- Location within Peru
- Location: Peru, Arequipa Region, Castilla Province, Condesuyos Province
- Parent range: Andes

Puma Ranra (Quechua puma cougar, puma, ranra stony, stony place) is a mountain in the Andes of Peru, about 5,000 metres (16,404 ft) high. It is situated in the Arequipa Region, Castilla Province, Andagua District, and in the Condesuyos Province, Salamanca District. Puma Ranra lies southwest of Usqullu and Wakapallqa and Usqullu Lake, and northeast of the Coropuna volcano.
