= Yanamauras =

Mountain in Peru

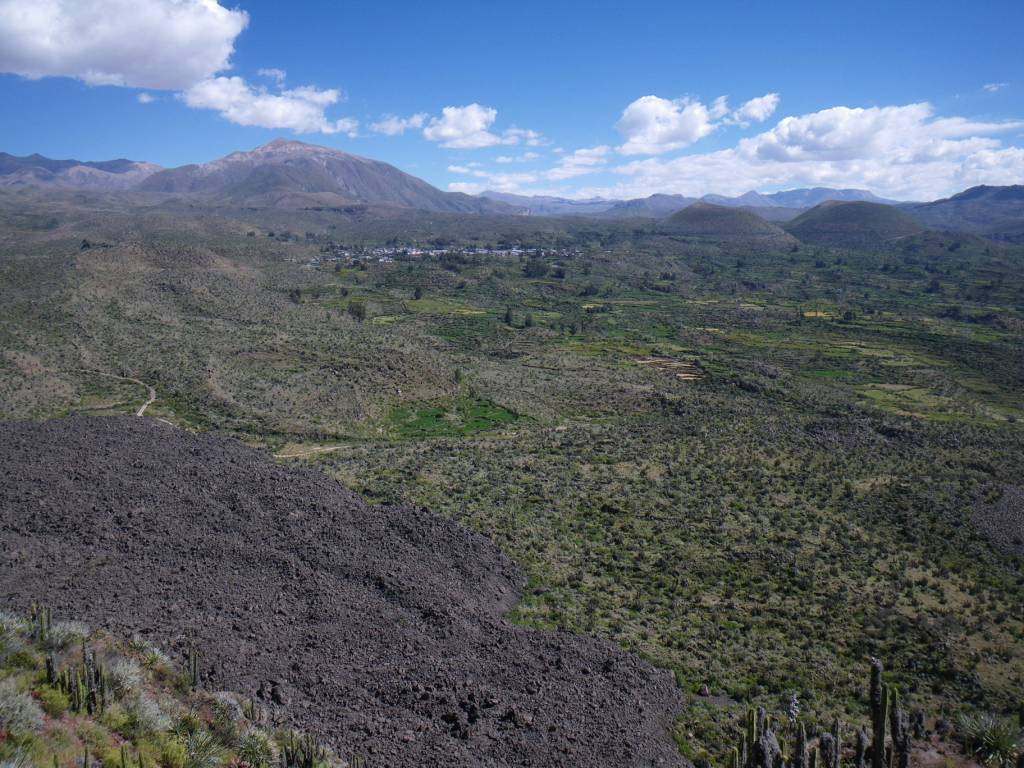
- The "Valley of the Volcanoes" as seen from Antaymarka, looking to the northwest: Ticsho (on the left), Yanamauras (on the right) and the village of Andagua (Antawa) in the center

Highest point
- Elevation: 3,761 m (12,339 ft)
- Coordinates: 15°29′02″S 72°21′06″W

Geography
- Location within Peru
- Location: Peru, Arequipa Region
- Parent range: Andes

Yanamauras (possibly from Quechua Yana Mawras, yana black) is a volcano in the Andes of Peru, about 3,761 metres (12,339 ft) high. It is situated in the "Valley of the Volcanoes" in the Arequipa Region, Castilla Province, Andagua District. Yanamauras lies southwest of the Puca Mauras volcano and east of the Ticsho volcano.
