= Wakapallqa =

Mountain in Peru

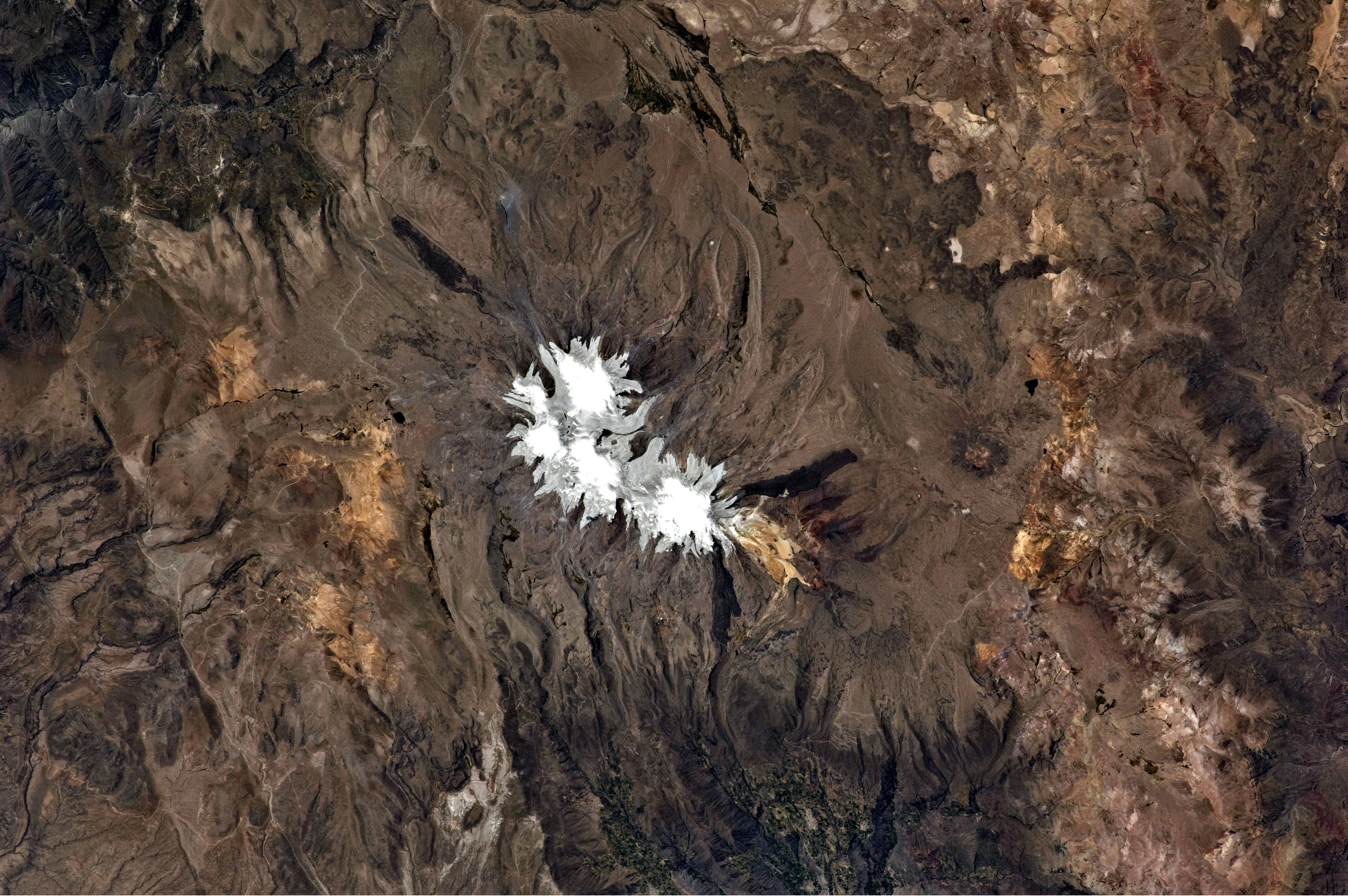
- Coropuna (snow-covered) and Wakapallqa (to the right) as seen from the ISS (north is to the upper right part of this image)

Highest point
- Elevation: 5,000 m (16,000 ft)
- Coordinates: 15°28′23″S 72°28′42″W

Geography
- Location within Peru
- Location: Peru, Arequipa Region, Castilla Province
- Parent range: Andes

Wakapallqa (Quechua waka cow (a borrowing from Spanish, pallqa, p'allqa bifurcation, Hispanicized spelling Huagapalca) is a mountain in the Andes of Peru, about 5,000 metres (16,404 ft) high. It lies in the Arequipa Region, Castilla Province, Andagua District. Wakapallqa is situated northeast of Puma Ranra and southeast of Usqullu and Usqullu Lake.
