= Ticsho =

Mountain in Peru

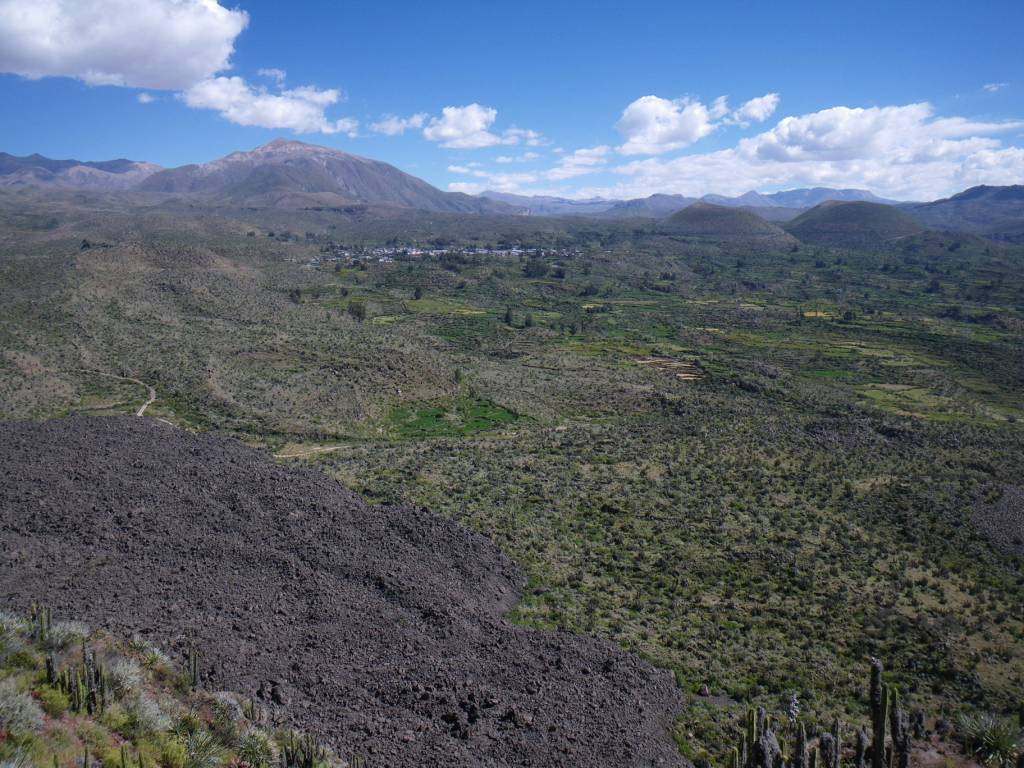
- The "Valley of the Volcanoes" as seen from Antaymarka, looking north-west: Ticsho (on the left), the volcano Yanamauras (on the right) and the village Andagua (Antawa) in the center

Highest point
- Elevation: 3,860 m (12,660 ft)
- Coordinates: 15°29′05″S 72°22′43″W

Geography
- Location within Peru
- Location: Peru, Arequipa Region
- Parent range: Andes

Ticsho (possibly from Quechua T'iksu, for inclination or motion to one side, obliqueness, slant, Hispanicized spelling Ticsho) is a volcano in the Andes of Peru, about 3,860 metres (12,664 ft) high. It is situated in the "Valley of the Volcanoes" in the Arequipa Region, Castilla Province, Andagua District. Ticsho lies south-west of the volcano Puca Mauras and west of the volcano Yanamauras.
