= Andagua volcanic field =

Volcanic field in Peru

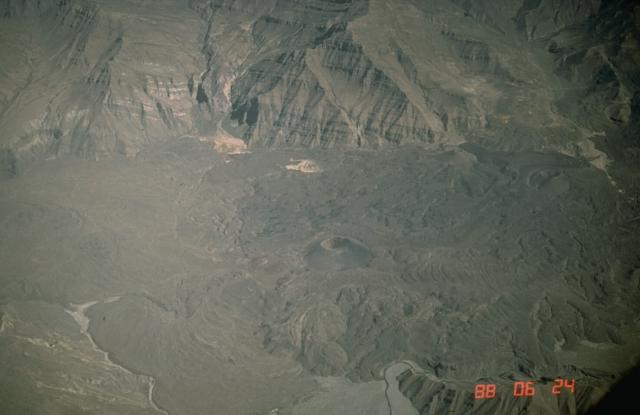
Cinder cones surrounded by lava flows

The Andagua volcanic field (also known as Andahua) is a volcanic field in southern Peru which includes a number of cinder cones, lava domes and lava flows which have filled the Andagua Valley (which is also known as Valley of the Volcanoes for this reason). The volcanic field is part of a larger volcanic province that clusters around the Colca River and is mostly of Pleistocene age, although the Andagua sector also features volcanic cones with historical activity, with the last eruption about 370 years ago. Eruptions were mostly effusive, generating lava flows, cones and small eruption columns. Future eruptions are possible, and there is ongoing fumarolic activity. Volcanic activity in the field has flooded the Andahua valley with lava flows, damming local watersheds in the Laguna de Chachas, Laguna Mamacocha and Laguna Pumajallo lakes and burying the course of the Andagua River. The Andahua valley segment of the larger volcanic province was declared a geopark in 2015.

== History and name ==
The volcanoes were first mentioned in a 1904 report but scientific investigation began by 1960; owing to the small size of Andagua volcanoes and their remote location they have not gained as much scientific interest as the large stratovolcanoes in the region. Eruptions have been dated on the basis of radiocarbon dating, potassium-argon dating and the morphology of the resulting vents as younger structures are steeper.

The term "Andagua volcanic field" has not been used consistently and sometimes the term "Andagua Group" or variants with "Andahua" are used, reflecting the older name of the town; the field is also known as Andagua-Orcopampa volcanic field. The term "Valley of the Volcanoes" is a reference to the volcanoes that fill the valley floor.

== Geology and geomorphology ==
The Andagua volcanic field lies in southern Peru, 135 kilometres (84 mi) from the city of Arequipa and within the Arequipa Department and its provinces Castilla, Caylloma and Condesuyos. The towns of Orcopampa, Andagua/Andahua, Soporo, Chachas, Sucna and Ayo lie in its area along with mines and the Inka sites of Antaymarca, Ayo and Jello Jello; economic activity includes farming and mining as well as commerce and industrial activity. There are several mines, some inactive, and several settlements, some ruined.

The volcanic field consists of cinder cones, lava domes, lava flow fields, pyroclastic cones, and scoria cones. Lava flows emanated from cones, domes and fractures; some cones have been breached by lava flows. Lava flows reach lengths of 20 kilometres (12 mi) and thicknesses of 80 metres (260 ft); their surfaces are blocky and feature channels. The highest individual volcano is 400 metres (1,300 ft) high although the average height of cones is about 50–170 metres (160–560 ft) or 200–300 metres (660–980 ft) and their width is about 500–650 metres (1,640–2,130 ft); lava domes reach heights of 20–150 metres (66–492 ft). Most of the vents are concentrated in the Valley of the Volcanoes, a 60 kilometres (37 mi) long and 1–9 kilometres (0.62–5.59 mi) wide valley that descends to the Colca River, where they form clusters and alignments which have flooded the valley and tributary valleys with lava flows; most vents are situated on the valley floor while others lie on its flanks. Aside from the Andagua Valley proper, the volcanoes spread across the Apune Valley to the northwest and the Ayo Valley to the south. These are not monogenetic volcanoes as some of them show evidence of multiple eruption episodes. Colours range from grey over reddish to black, with reddish colours appearing on weathered lavas. Young volcanic terrain resembles a moonscape. The valley is flanked by 3,500–5,000 metres (11,500–16,400 ft) high mountains.

Among the vents are:

- West-northwest from Orcopampa lies the wide Mauras cone with a surrounding lava flow field. Farther northwest still the Jullulluyoc and Umajala lava domes and lava flows which reach the road between Orcopampa and the Poracota gold mine. All three are of Pleistocene age and the second two developed on ridges flanking the valley; Umajala bears signs of glaciation.
- In the valley of the Sora River lie a number of lava domes and three pyroclastic cones along with a lava flow field that reaches to the Andagua River. The cinder cones from north to south are Misahuana Mauras, Pabellón and Yana Mauras, while one of the lava domes is known as Jochane. This dome is the largest dome in the Andagua valley. An additional lava flow lies in the Pallca River valley, which joins the Sora River valley from the west, just before the entry of the Sora River valley into the Andagua Valley. These are of Pleistocene to Holocene age.
- South of Misahuanca in the Andagua valley lie six vents with a surrounding Pleistocene lava flow field; these vents are the Cerro Mauras cinder cone and two lava domes forming a northern cluster, and the cinder cone Challhue Mauras, the lava dome Tororocsa and the cinder cone Panahua aligned in west–east direction. Some of the vents predate the surrounding lava flows, while others post-date them such as Cerro Mauras which formed atop an older vent; the lava flows themselves blocked the valley and formed a large lava flow field. An additional also Pleistocene lava dome and lava flow are located farther east and fill a hanging valley.
- The Santa Rosa cinder cones and the Cerro Puca Mauras cinder cone, the largest in the Andagua volcanic field, along with a few lava domes such as Chipchane and an unnamed over 2 kilometres (1.2 mi) wide dome lie within a Pleistocene to Holocene age lava flow field that spreads northwards, westwards and southwards towards the Andagua River, covering the entire valley. Consequently, the Andagua River cut a gorge across the lava flow fields, which ends in a waterfall farther south. This part of the volcanic field produced the most volcanic activity; its vents were controlled by faults. Puca Mauras is the largest cone and features pre-Hispanic buildings.
- Around the town of Andagua and along the road to Viraco west of Andagua lies a Pleistocene lava flow field that propagates from interconnected lava domes/lava craters in the El Tambo River valley east-southeastwards towards Andagua. The largest of these lava domes lies east of Andagua, is called Cochapampa and features a lava dome nested within its crater; additionally, the cinder cones Yanamauras, Yanamauras Sur directly north of Andagua and Ticsho northwest of the town are also part of this field. The vents here are spread across the valley, are smaller and have different ages. For example, the Pra-Ticsho lava dome is 270,000 years old while Ticsho only 4,050.
- Southeast of Andagua, the valley is mainly filled by Holocene lava flows, except around Soporo and east of Chachas where there are Pleistocene lava flows; this part of the volcanic field is known as the Chilcayoc lava field. Along with these are dispersed cinder cones such as Jenchana south of Andagua, Ninamama east of Andagua, Pampalquita, Ucuja, Chico, Chilcayoc, Jechapita clockwise around Soporo and Chilcayoc Grande farther east, along with a number of lava domes such as the cluster west of Sucna. One of the domes around Soporo is heavily eroded, the cinder cones are in part breached by lava flows. Chilcayoc Grande is the most prominent cinder cone of the Andagua volcanic field.
- North of the Chachas lake lies another lava flow field, with two lava domes aligned in southwest–northeast direction and a cinder cone Cerro Ticlla; the flows reached Chachas lake. This field is of Pleistocene age and bears signs of glaciation but the Cerro Pucamauras cinder cone in its middle is younger.

Older volcanic landforms are vegetated and have developed a soil cover, and sometimes are altered by river or glacial erosion or have been converted into farmland. Overall, in outcrops the volcanic rocks of the Andagua valley reach great thickness, forming plains of lava and occasionally accumulations or fields of volcanic ash; the total volume of volcanic rocks is about 15 ± 5 cubic kilometres (3.6 ± 1.2 cu mi) and thicknesses are about 130 metres (430 ft).

The Andagua River flows through the Valley of the Volcanoes; it originates from the confluence of the Chilcaimarca and Orcopampa Rivers and receives several tributaries over its course in the valley. In the Valley of the Volcanoes, the Andagua River has cut a gorge into the lava fields and has formed waterfalls, while elsewhere it disappears under the lava flows. Lava flows have formed lakes by damming drainages, such as Laguna de Chachas, Laguna Mamacocha and Laguna Pumajallo; additionally sediments from older lakes have been found at Canco. The waters of the Andagua River disappear in lava flows over a path of over 16 kilometres (9.9 mi); the Laguna Mamacocha produces the Mamacocha River whose water ultimately originates in the Andagua River and which eventually flows into the Colca River.

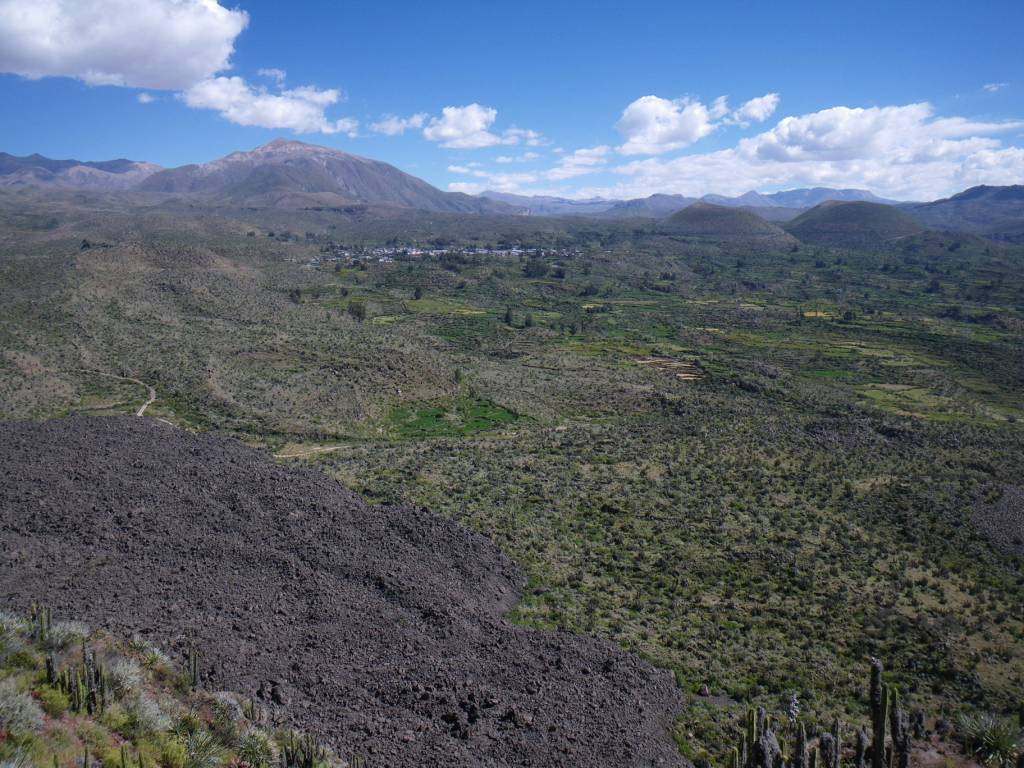
Volcanoes seen from Mirador Antaymarca

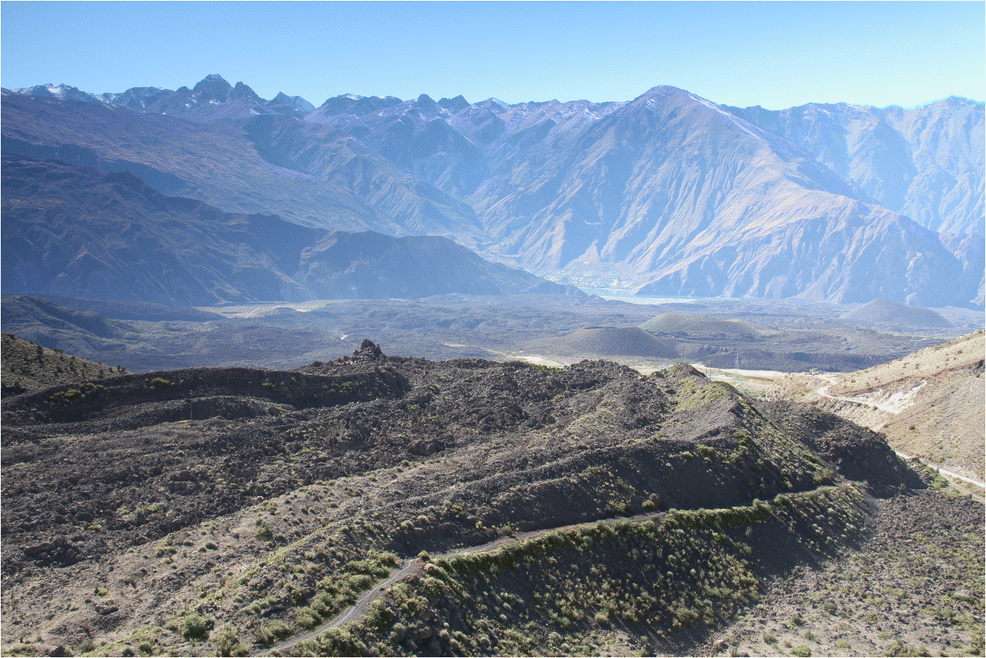
A lava flow in the volcanic field

=== Composition ===
The volcanic field has erupted rocks ranging from basaltic andesite to dacite, with composition varying from one individual volcano to the other but dominantly sodic although it has also been described as potassic owing to the poassium-silica ratio. Generally, the rocks fall into the categories benmoreite, latite and mugearite with rare andesite and basalt. Phenocrysts include hornblende, olivine, plagioclase and pyroxene and less commonly alkali feldspar and biotite, and xenoliths have been reported as well. Overall, the composition of the magma is the most primitive of the magmas of southern Peru and underwent crystallization in deep magma chambers which "overflowed" in the form of an eruption once new magma entered them. In addition, the magma underwent some degree of contamination with crustal materials. Garnets have been recovered from a place named Lomas Uña Huajana, which in Quechua means "place of weeping children".

=== Geologic context ===
Off the western coast of South America, the Nazca Plate subducts beneath the South American Plate at a rate of 9 centimetres per year (3.5 in/year). It probably commenced during the Paleozoic and continues to the present day. The subduction has been accompanied by orogeny and volcanic activity, with three distinct phases of folding known as the Mochica, Peruvian and Inca phases which gave rise to faults and folds. The volcanic activity manifested itself as a set of volcanic arcs, such as the Tacaza arc with mineral-bearing calderas and the presently active Central Volcanic Zone which includes the Andagua volcanic field. In turn, the Central Volcanic Zone is one of three main volcanic arcs in the Andes which are separated by gaps without volcanic activity. Small volcanoes such as these of the Andagua volcanic field are a subordinate part of the Peruvian Central Volcanic Zone; most volcanoes are large and among these is Sabancaya with historical activity, El Misti with solfataric activity, Coropuna, which is the highest volcano in Peru and features Holocene activity, Firura and Solimana north and west from Coropuna, and Mismi, Hualca Hualca, Ampato, Chachani and Pichu Pichu. Additional volcanoes of this volcanic zone occur in Bolivia and Chile.

The terrain surrounding the volcanic field features alluvium of Pleistocene to Holocene age, the volcanic Neogene/Pliocene Barroso Group and Mesozoic sediments of the Yura Group and the Socosani Formation. Faults crisscross the volcanic field, magma may have used them as ascent paths; the Valley of the Volcanoes itself is a fault-limited graben and some faults offset Quaternary deposits.

The Andagua volcanic field is sometimes considered to include a 110 by 110 kilometres (68 mi × 68 mi) area outside of the Valley of the Volcanoes, which itself features seven separate clusters of volcanoes with 64 volcanic centres including the Valley of the Volcanoes but also the Antapuna, Colca Valley, Huambo-Cabanaconde, Laguna Parihuana, Molloco Valley and Pampa Jaran; these clusters are separated from each other by geographic and geologic traits. Alternatively, some of these are considered to be a volcanic province of which Andagua is only one field of.

Among these are:

- The Antapuna field is located just north of the Andagua volcanic field and is centered on the heavily glacially eroded Antapuna volcano. Several lava domes and lava flows occur in this area, such as Cerro Antapuna west of Antapuna, Tanca southwest of Antapuna, Pampa Pisaca and another lava dome southeast of Antapuna and several unnamed cinder cones and lava flows northeast of Antapuna. The vents are glacially eroded and of Pleistocene age with the exception of Pumaranra northwest from Antapuna.
- The Molloco River valley features several Pleistocene to Holocene lava domes such as Uchuychaca and Cerro Coropuna (not to be confused with Coropuna, a stratovolcano), which are located around the Marhuas cinder cone. Two small lava flows lie in the Colca River valley upstream of the junction with the Molloco River.
- Several lava domes with associated lava flows are found in the Colca River valley at Chivay; they are between 400,000 and 90,000 years old but thermal springs occur there.
- South of Caylloma several volcanoes are found on an upland; they are Antaymarca, Saigua, Challpo, Andallullo, Antacollo and Sani and appear to be old given their vegetation.
- Finally, there are volcanoes associated with the Andagua volcanic field south of the Colca River. These are from west to east the Luceria field west of Gloriahuasi with the Honda and San Cristobal cinder cones, the Gloriahuasi field north of Gloriahuasi with two branches of lava flows, the Timar field northeast of Gloriahuasi with the Gloriahuasi stratovolcano - the only stratovolcano that is part of the Andagua volcanic field -, the Jaran field northwest from Lagunillas Pass which has the Marbas Grande cinder cone, the Marbas Chico cinder cones and Llajuapampa cinder cone, and finally the Uchan field south of the Lagunillas Pass with the Uchan Sur and Tururunca cinder cones, some lava domes farther south and a lava flow field that also runs south. With the exception of the Huambo volcanic field which features Holocene vents they are all of Pleistocene age.

== Climate and vegetation ==
Temperatures vary between parts of the volcanic field, with Ayo having a semi-warm climate with temperatures of 15–24 °C (59–75 °F) while Chachas has 1–17 °C (34–63 °F) and Orcopampa of −10–12 °C (14–54 °F). The climate in the region is dry with a wet season that lasts from November to April. Precipitation increases with altitude. Humid periods have occurred recently, including two around 600 and 1000 AD linked to El Nino phenomena.

Vegetation in the region includes alder, cacti, eucalyptus, ichu grass, Polylepis trees, tola shrubs, pillow-shaped yareta. The exact vegetation type varies with elevation, defining four life zones:

- The yungas below 2,300 metres (7,500 ft) elevation is a dry desert; only succulent plants grow there.
- The quechua belt lies between 2,300 metres (7,500 ft) and 3,500 metres (11,500 ft) elevation and has cacti (including Corryocactus volcanicus, which is endemic to this region), grasses and shrubs. Some of it is used for pastures and agriculture.
- Towards the suni at 3,500–4,000 metres (11,500–13,100 ft) elevation, precipitation increases to about 400 millimetres per year (16 in/year). There bushes, ichu grass and trees grow.
- Above 4,000 metres (13,000 ft) elevation is the puna belt, where vegetation cover declines again.

The Laguna Mamacocha and Chachas are populated by fish and form oases. There is also farmland on agricultural terraces. Crops cultivated in the area, especially at Ayo and Andagua, include barley, broad bean, corn, lucerne, potatoes and wine.

== Eruption history ==
The oldest activity of the Andagua volcanic field occurred between 400,000 and 64,000 years ago and has been identified close to Chivay in the Colca Valley. Three separate generations of volcanic activity have been defined, a Pleistocene generation, a Pleistocene-Holocene generation and a Holocene generation, with about 3-4 vents forming every ten thousand years. The eruptions of the Andagua volcanic field cones have been accompanied by the emission of slow-moving lava flows and ballistic ejecta which reached less than 2 kilometres (1.2 mi) distance from the vents; estimated volcanic explosivity indexes are 0-2 and the volcanic activity has been described as Strombolian eruptions or phreatomagmatic and accompanied by small eruption columns. Hawaiian eruptions and Strombolian eruptions generated scoria cones.

Ticsho was emplaced 4,060 years ago on an older dome, Mauras and Yana Mauras 2,900 years ago while the eruption of Chilcayoc Grande occurred 1451 - 1523. The youngest eruptions occurred along the Jenchana-Ninanmama fault and the most recent event was dated to 370 years ago and took place at Chilcayoc Chico. A more recent eruption was reported in 1913, but it is not clear that it actually occurred in the Andagua volcanic field. Neither historical records nor local records such as legends mention volcanic activity although pre-Inka agricultural areas were impacted by lava flows and two towns were destroyed by volcanic activity later than the Spanish conquest. Presently, hydrogen sulfide emanates from the Ninamama flow and has generated gypsum and sulfur deposits, and fumarolic activity was reported in 2003 although other sources state that no fumarolic activity occurs; future eruptions are certainly possible.

=== Hazards from future eruptions ===
The volcanoes are regarded as "very low hazard" by the Peruvian geological agency, which As of 2022 is working to build a monitoring network for the Andagua volcanoes and has drawn up maps of potentially endangered infrastructure. Various towns with a total population of about 11,800 people are located at the feet of extinct vents, but usually at a distance from the youngest volcanoes although shifts in vent location during the course of an eruption could bring hazards to these towns. Explosive eruptions could result in fallout of lava bombs, tephra and volcanic ash, but the impact would be limited to the surroundings of the vent, probably less than 6 kilometres (3.7 mi). The volcanic field however also produced lava flows in the past, which can reach larger distances and also infrastructure such as the Mantaro-Socabaya power line and could also bury the ground for perhaps thousands of years.

== Access and national park project ==
A number of paths and roads pass through the volcanic field. Andagua's surroundings are considered to be a typical expression of the volcanic field and the creation of a national park covering parts of the volcanic field has been proposed. A geopark was created in 2015 and by UNESCO in 2019, some volcanoes of the Andagua volcanic field are considered to be geosites with some spots already protected in some way; the area is of value from the perspectives of both geotourism and science.

There is a scenic byway with numerous lookout points. A concentration of such small volcanoes such as Andagua in an easily accessible location is not common in the world. In general, aside from their role as hazards, volcanoes are important sources of tourism-based income.

== See also ==
- List of volcanic fields
