= Usqullu =

Mountain in Peru

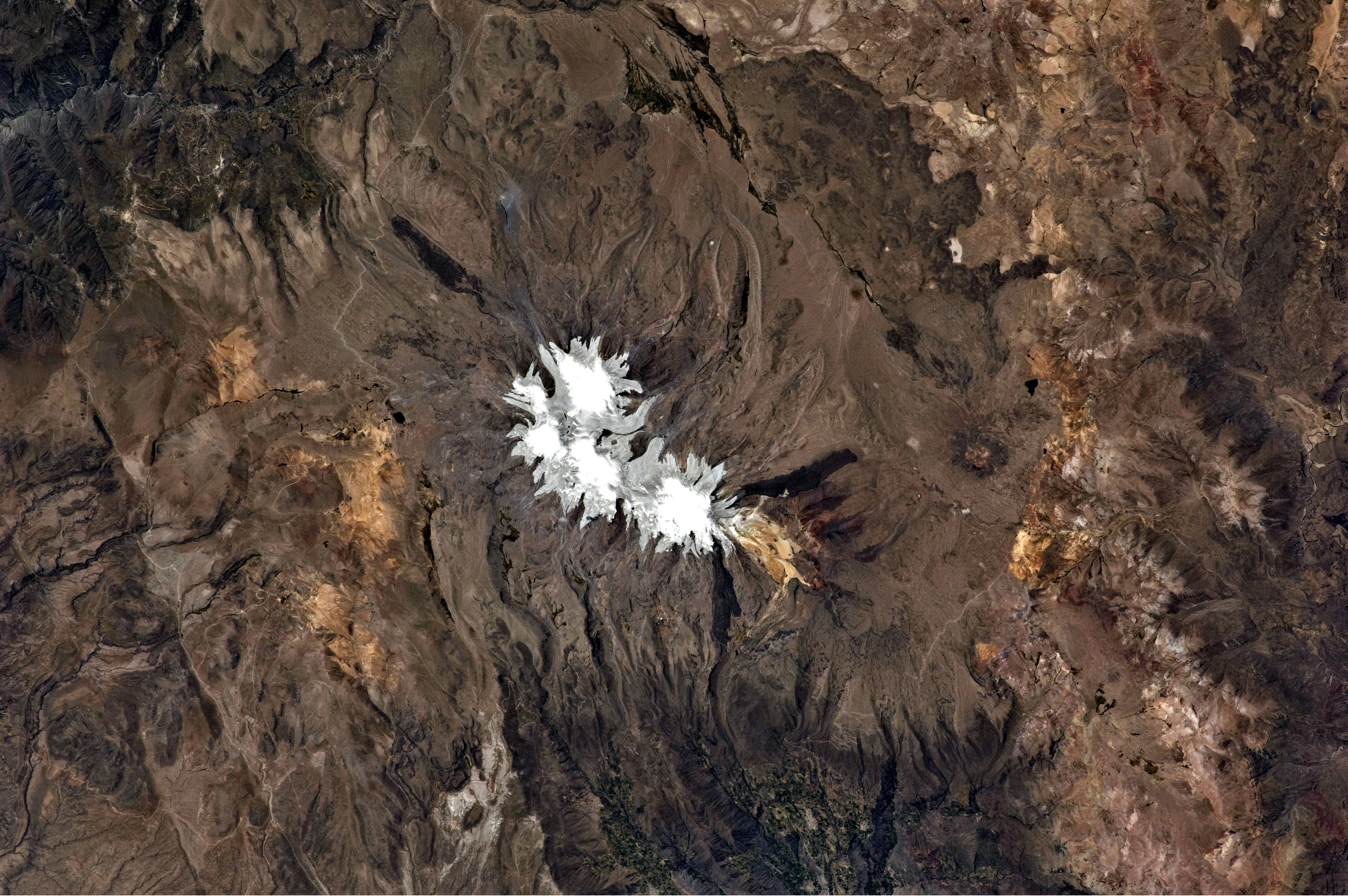
- Coropuna (snow-covered) and Usqullu (to the right) as seen from the ISS (north is to the upper right part of this image)

Highest point
- Elevation: 5,000 m (16,000 ft)
- Coordinates: 15°26′52″S 72°29′20″W

Geography
- Location within Peru
- Location: Peru, Arequipa Region, Castilla Province
- Parent range: Andes

Usqullu (Quechua for Andean mountain cat, hispanicized spelling Oscollo) is a mountain in the Andes of Peru, about 5,000 metres (16,404 ft) high. It is situated in the Arequipa Region, Castilla Province, Andagua District. Usqullu lies northwest of the peak of Wakapallqa (Huagapalca) and northeast of Puma Ranra and Usqullu Lake.
