= Chachas Lake =

Lake in Peru

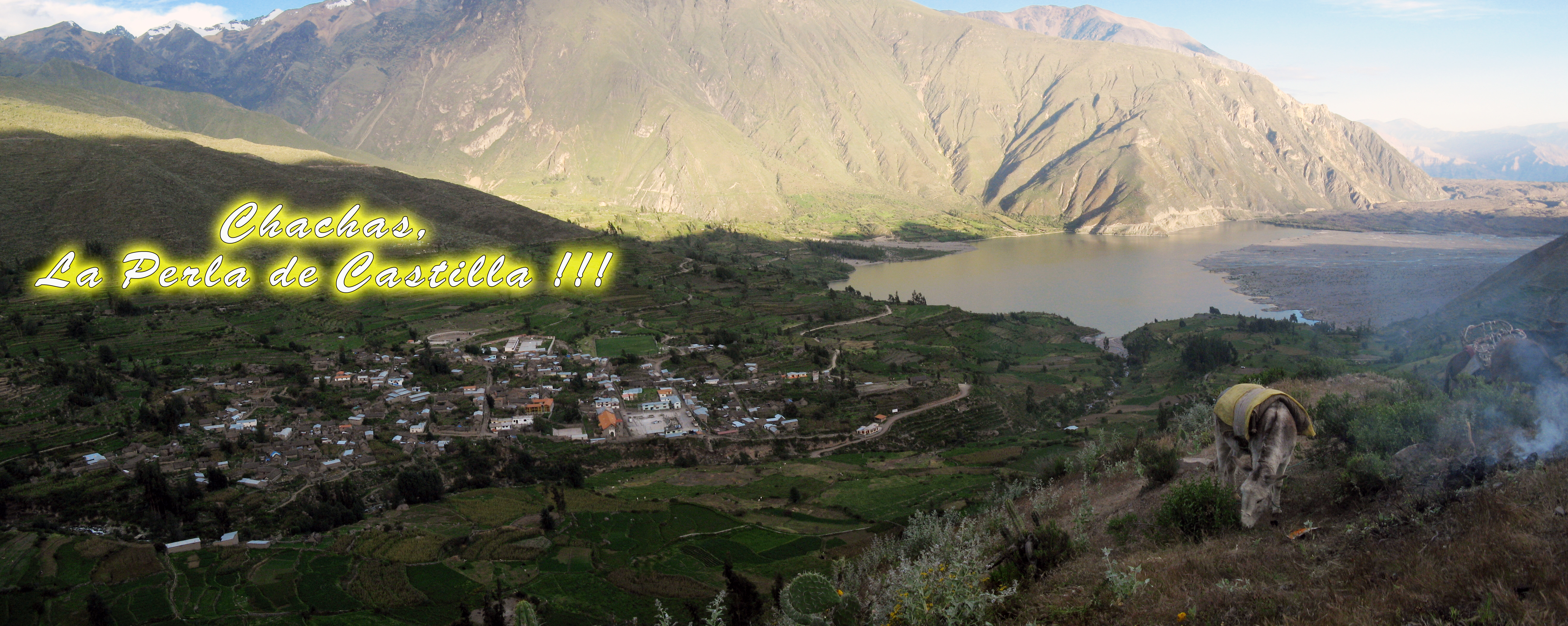
- The town and the lake Chachas

- Location within Peru
- Location: Peru; Arequipa Region
- Coordinates: 15°31′16″S 72°15′36″W
- Surface elevation: 2,940 m (9,650 ft)

Chachas Lake is a lake in Peru located in the Arequipa Region, Castilla Province, Chachas District. It is situated at a height of about 2,940 metres (9,646 ft). Chachas Lake lies southwest of the Ch'ila mountain range, near the town of Chachas.
