= Chinese Arch, Lima =

Paifang in Chinatown, Peru

Chinese Arch
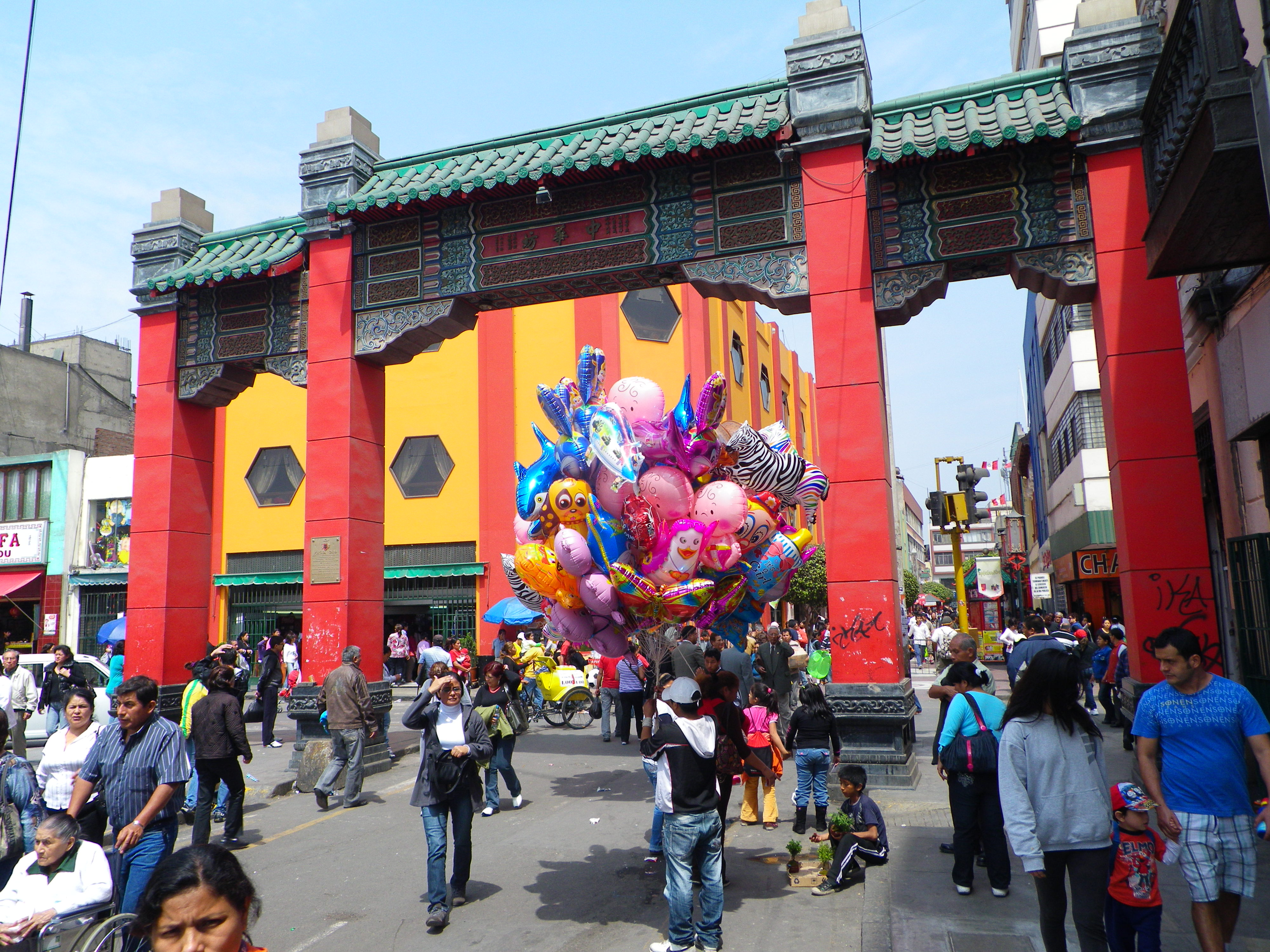
- 12°03′03″S 77°01′33″W
- Location: Chinatown, Lima
- Designer: Kuoway Ruiz Dillón; Carlos Lock Sing; Wa Kong Chang
- Type: Paifang
- Beginning date: 1971
- Completion date: November 12, 1971
- Dedicated to: Sesquicentennial of Peru

The Chinese Arch (Spanish: Arco Chino), also known as the Chinese Portal (Spanish: Portada China), is a paifang located at the entrance of Lima's Chinatown, in Barrios Altos. It was a donation to Peru by its Chinese colony and the Government of the Republic of China (Taiwan)—at the time recognised by Peru—in commemoration of its 150th year of independence.

== History ==
It was donated by the Peruvian Chinese colony, in collaboration with the Government of the Republic of China (Taiwan), for the Sesquicentennial of the Independence of Peru and inaugurated with a great party on November 12, 1971, by the mayor of Lima Eduardo Dibós as part of the remodeling and enhancement of the area as a tourist attraction.

In 2017, two 1.80-metre, 2.5-ton sculptures of lions located in the arch were unveiled.

== Overview ==
The monument is built in the form of a paifang, which is a style of gate in traditional Chinese architecture, resembling an arch. It measures 8 metres high and 13 wide. The design is by the architects Tusanes Kuoway Ruiz Dillón and Carlos Lock Sing, and the cover, veneered in wood and marble, was decorated by the Chinese artist Wa Kong Chang.

The arch's lintel features various phrases in Chinese characters:

- The side that faces Abancay Avenue features the text "the Chinese Arch".
- The side that faces Capón street features a phrase from Confucianism: "Under the same sky, we are all equal".
- The remaining sides feature various inscriptions indicating that it is a present made to the city of Lima by overseas Chinese living in Peru, as well as its inauguration date.

== See also ==
- Sesquicentennial of the Independence of Peru
- Fuente China
- La yunta (sculpture)
- Las llamas
- Moorish Arch, Lima
