= Fuente China =

Monument in Lima, Peru

Chinese Fountain
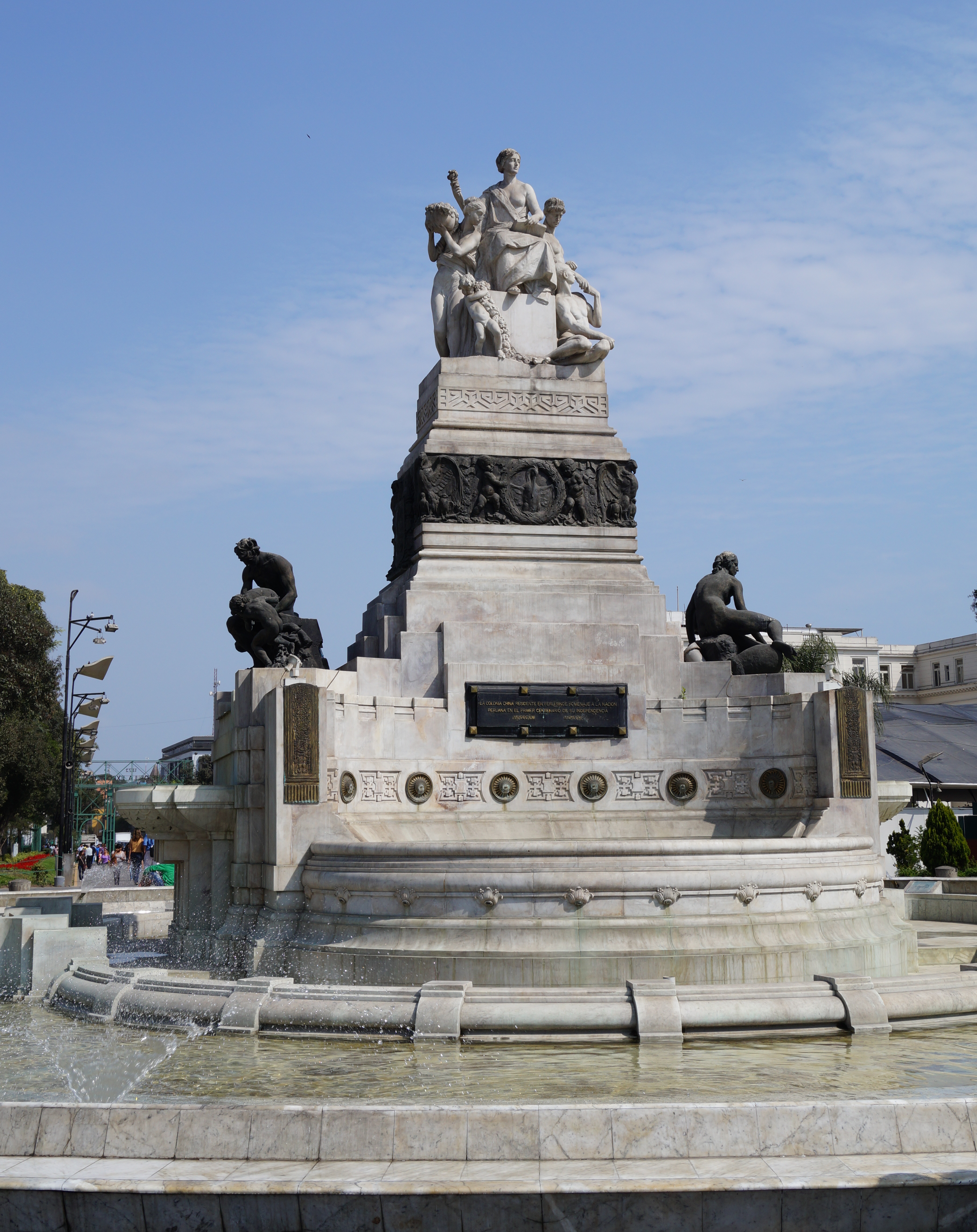
- Interactive map of Chinese Fountain
- Location: Park of the Exhibition
- Coordinates: 12°03′44″S 77°02′11″W
- Designer: Gaetano Moretti
- Type: Fountain monument
- Material: Marble and bronze
- Beginning date: 1921
- Completion date: July 28, 1924

The Chinese Fountain (Spanish: Fuente China), also known as the Three Races Fountain (Spanish: Fuente de las Tres Razas) is a fountain monument in the Park of the Exhibition of Lima, Peru.

== Overview ==
The work has a marble sculpture at the top, the work of the Italian sculptor Valmore Gemignani, with three characters that represent the fraternity of the human races, the white, the yellow and the black, for which it is also called the Fountain of the Three Races. On the sides are two allegories that represent the Amazon and Yellow rivers, made in bronze by the sculptor Ettore Graziosi. There are also four representations of the Raimondi Stele from the Chavín culture.

== History ==
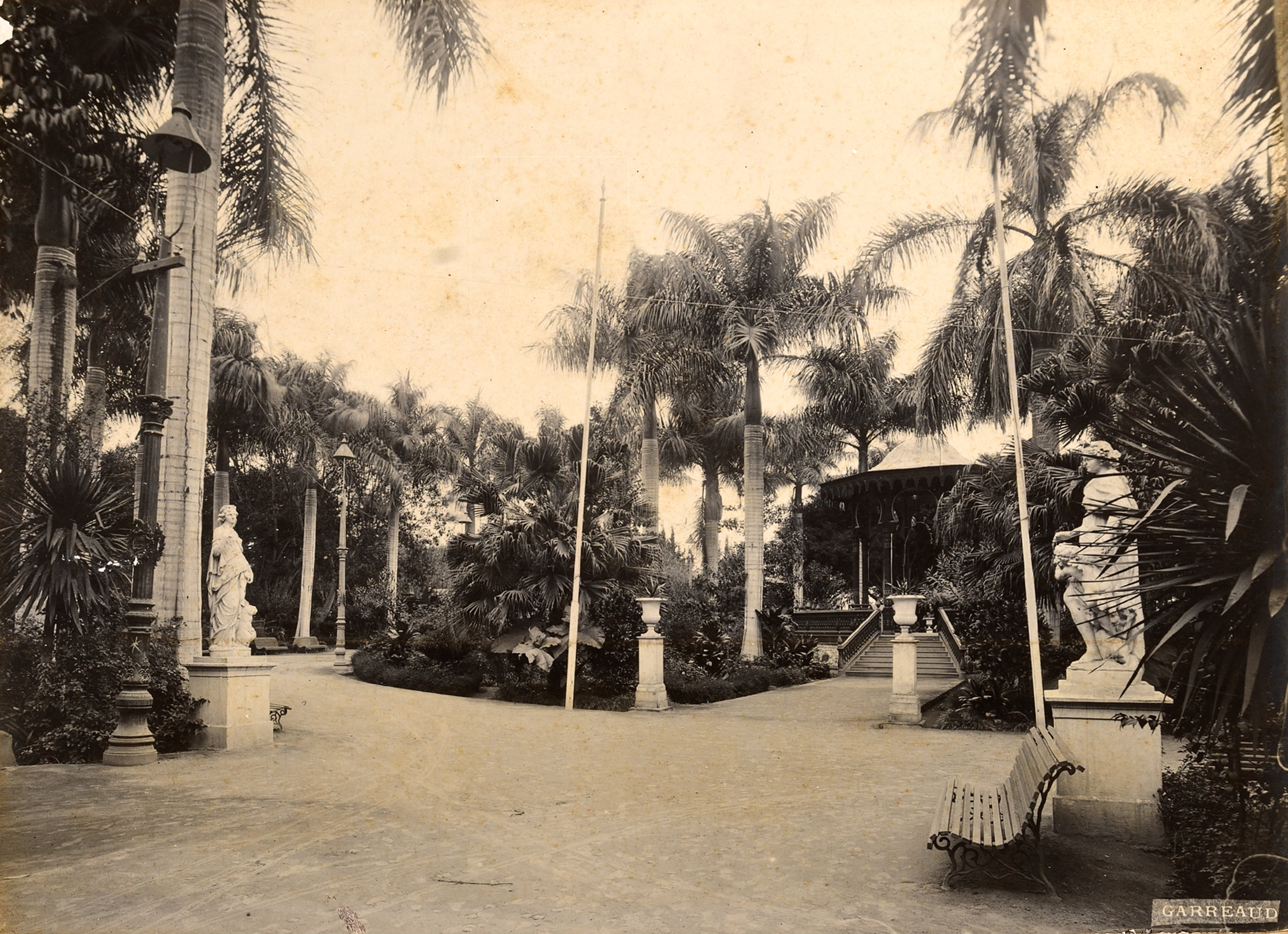
The kiosk replaced by the fountain.

In 1921, during the second government of Augusto B. Leguía, the Centennial of the Independence of Peru was celebrated and many colonies of foreign residents decided to grant gifts in the form of monuments to the Peruvian State. The Chinese colony joined in by creating a promoting committee led by Santiago Escudero Whu and Aurelio Pow San, important merchants and landowners of Chinese origin. The gift chosen was a monumental fountain designed by the architect Gaetano Moretti. The work was executed in Italy, in the workshop of Ettore Genovesi.

The first stone was laid in 1921 in the space previously occupied by the so-called "Kiosko de las Palmeras". The fountain was inaugurated on July 28, 1924.

== See also ==
- Chinese Peruvians
- Chinese Arch, Lima
- Las llamas
- La yunta (sculpture)

== Bibliography ==
- Pacheco, Juan José (2017). Parque de la Exposición. El jardín de Lima (in Spanish). Municipalidad Metropolitana de Lima. ISBN 9789972726156. OCLC 1126541508.
