= Sesquicentennial of the Independence of Peru =

150th anniversary of Peru

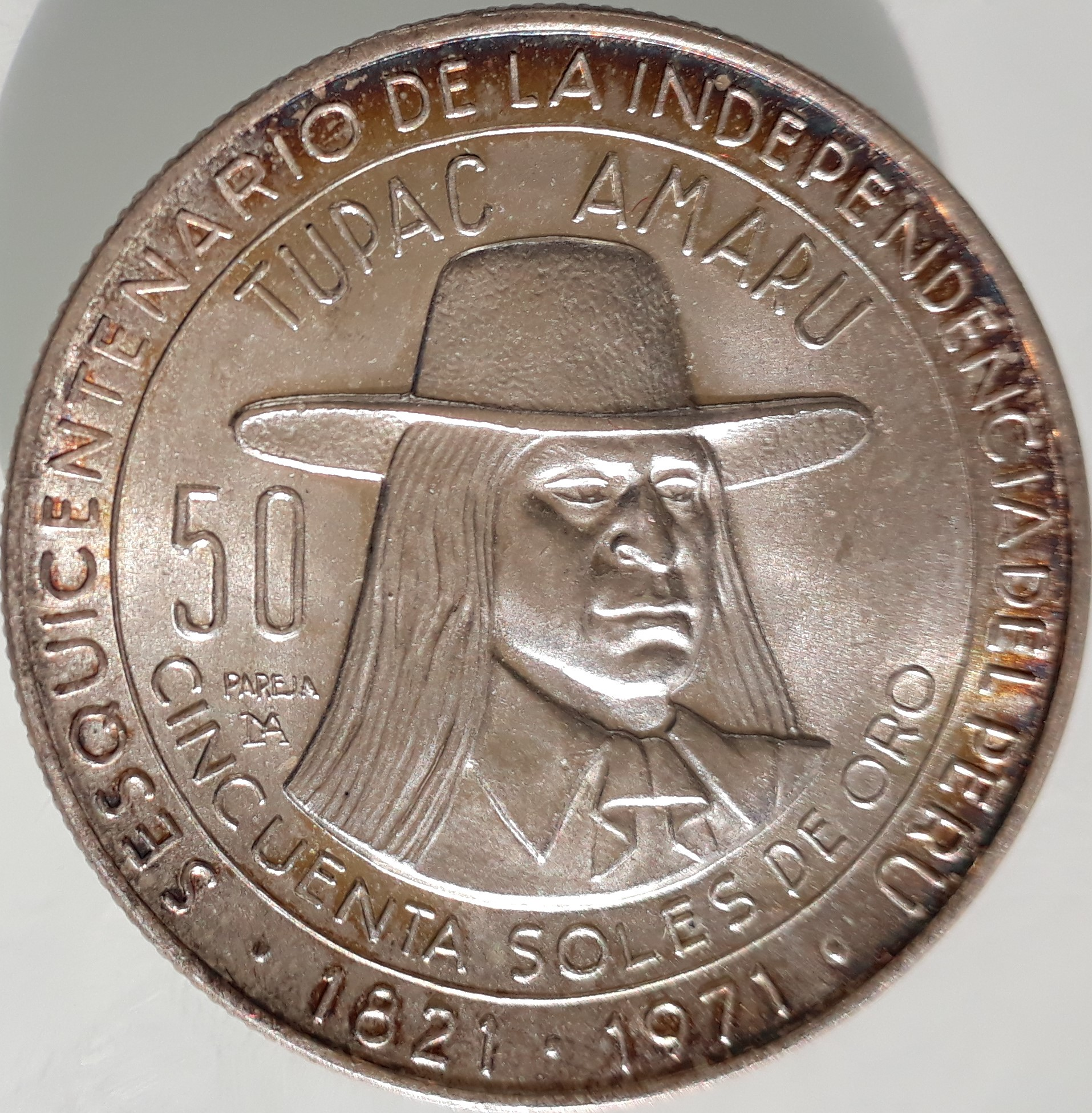
- S/.50 coin commemorating the event
- Date: July 28, 1971
- Location: Peru
- Previous event: Centennial (1921)
- Next event: Bicentennial (2021)
- Major events: 150th anniversary of the adoption of the Declaration of Independence
- Organiser: National Commission for the Sesquicentennial of the Independence of Peru

The Sesquicentennial of the Independence of Peru took place on July 28, 1971. To commemorate the 150 years of the country's independence from Spain, the Revolutionary Government established two years prior organized a Commission to manage the celebrations and the establishment of new memorials for the duration of the event.

== History ==
On September 16, 1969, the National Commission for the Sesquicentennial of the Independence of Peru was created by Decree Law No. 17815, during the government of Juan Velasco Alvarado. This commission was made up of representatives of state institutions, the academic community and civil society, assumed by EP Division General Juan Mendoza Rodríguez, also as an objective for the preparation and execution of the commemorative program throughout the country, for the 150th anniversary of Independence of Peru in 1971.

The Sesquicentennial Commission was in charge of organizing academic events, historical and music research contests, as well as advising on the construction of monuments and commemorative objects throughout the country; such as the Monument to San Martín and the Liberating Expedition (Paracas), Monument to the Heroes of Independence (Lima), Monument to Francisco Antonio de Zela (Tacna), Monument to the victors of Ayacucho (Ayacucho), etc. Likewise, plaques and busts were inaugurated in honor of all those who with their contribution, thought and exercise contributed to the Peruvian emancipation.

The academic work of the commission was reflected in 86 volumes of the Documentary Collection of the Independence of Peru, the History of the Emancipation of Peru and other publications. Another of the relevant activities was the contest for the creation of military marches, where musicians and citizens in general participated in the elaboration of the scores in honor of the sesquicentennial celebrations; the launch of commemorative stamps between 1970 and 1971, the issuance of commemorative coins, the restoration and expansion of the National Museum of Archaeology, Anthropology and History of Peru, the V International Congress of History in America, etc. The figure of Tupac Amaru II became the symbol of the agrarian reform and the social change proposed by the government.

== Gallery ==
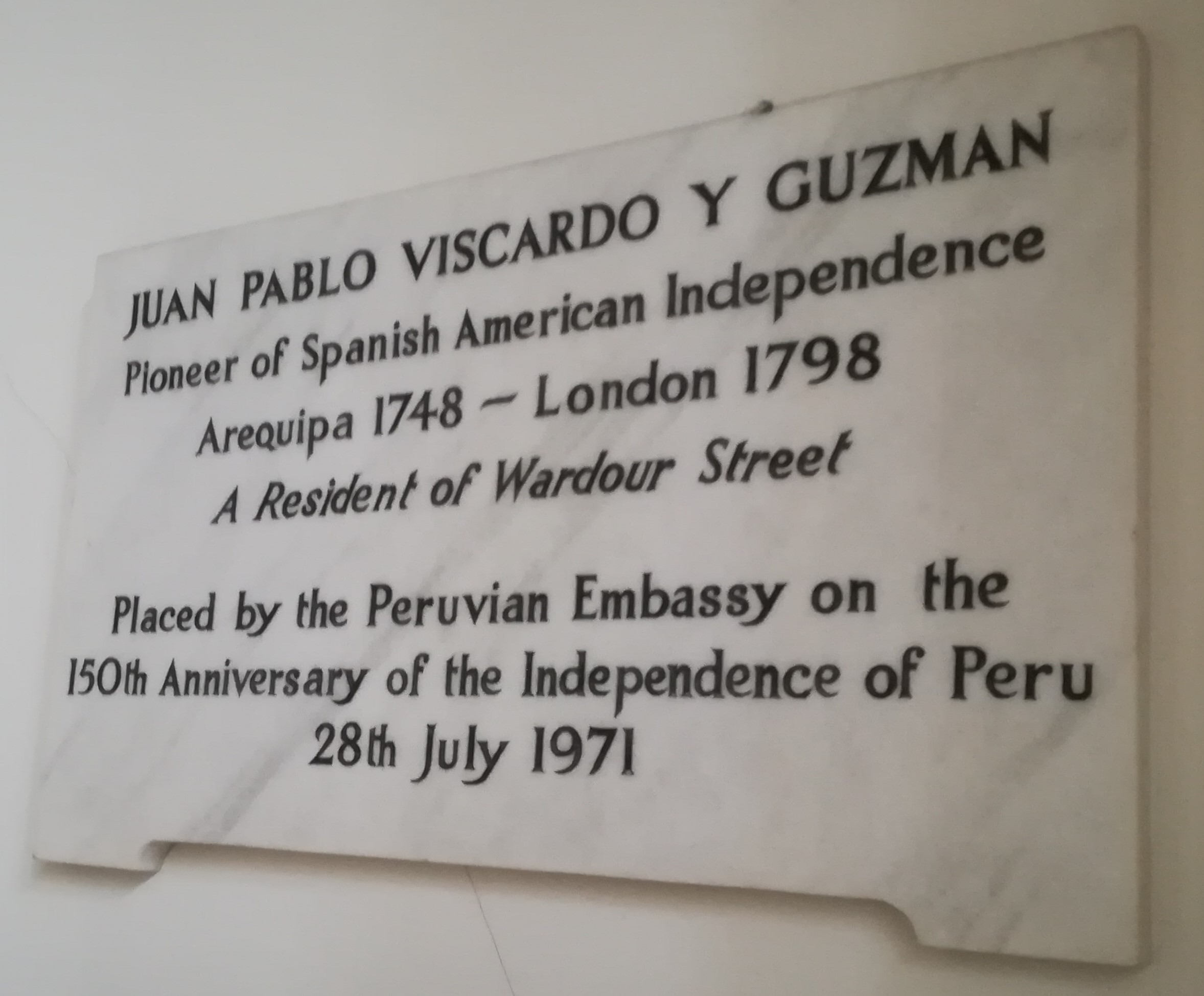
A memorial plaque to Juan Pablo Vizcardo at St. Patrick's Church, London.

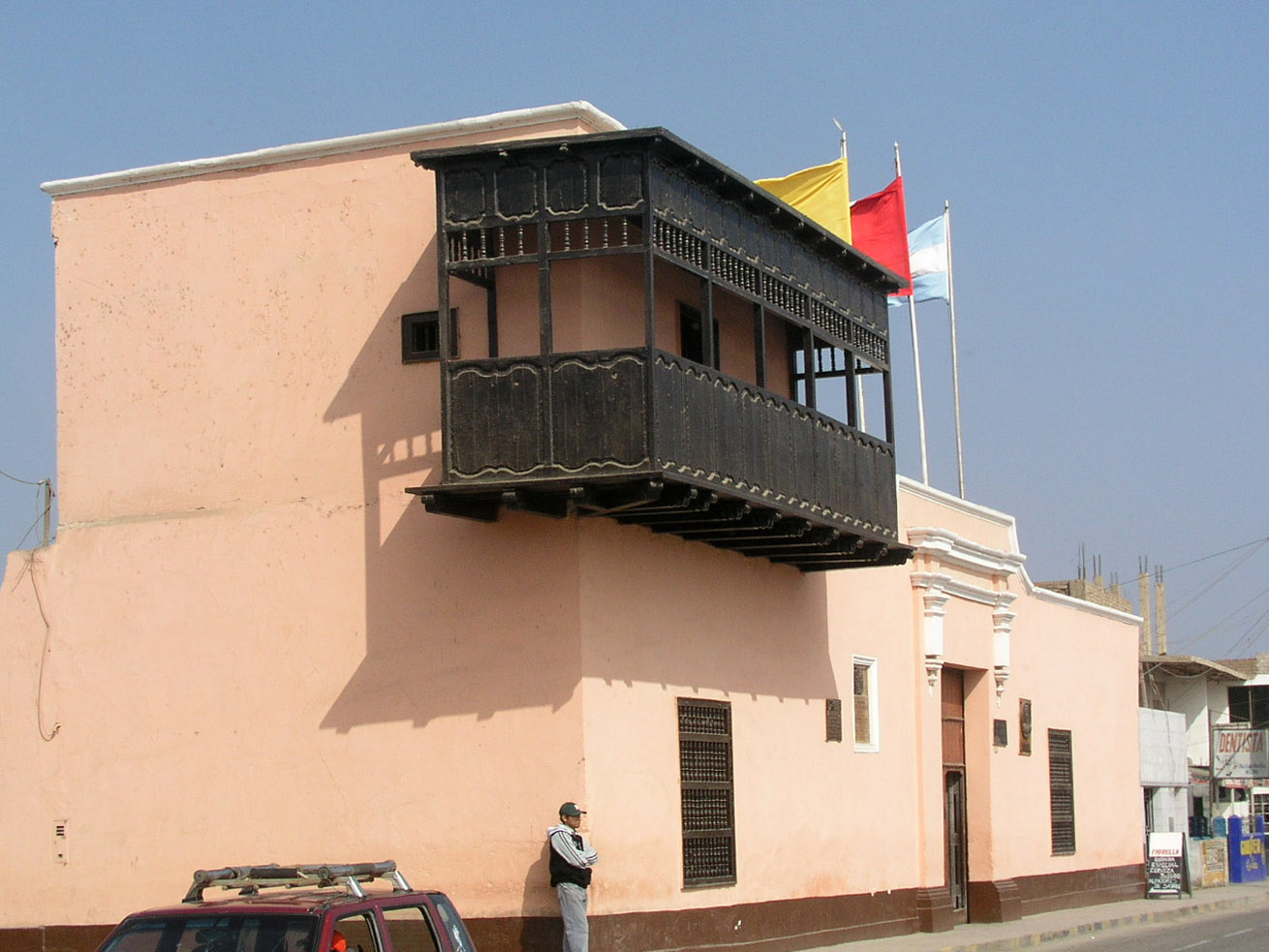
Monumental Museum of Huaura, established by the Commission.

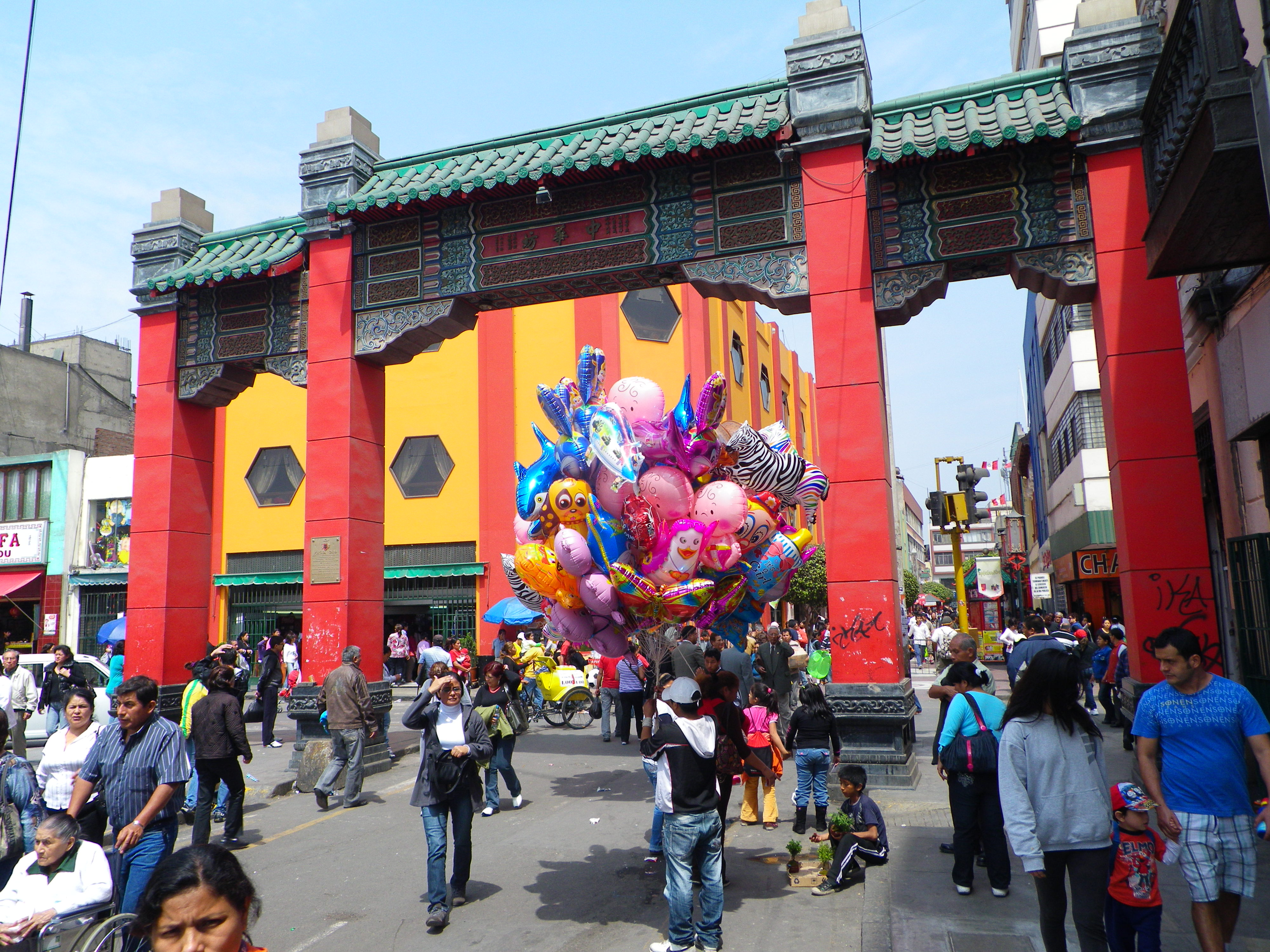
Chinese Arch at Lima's Chinatown

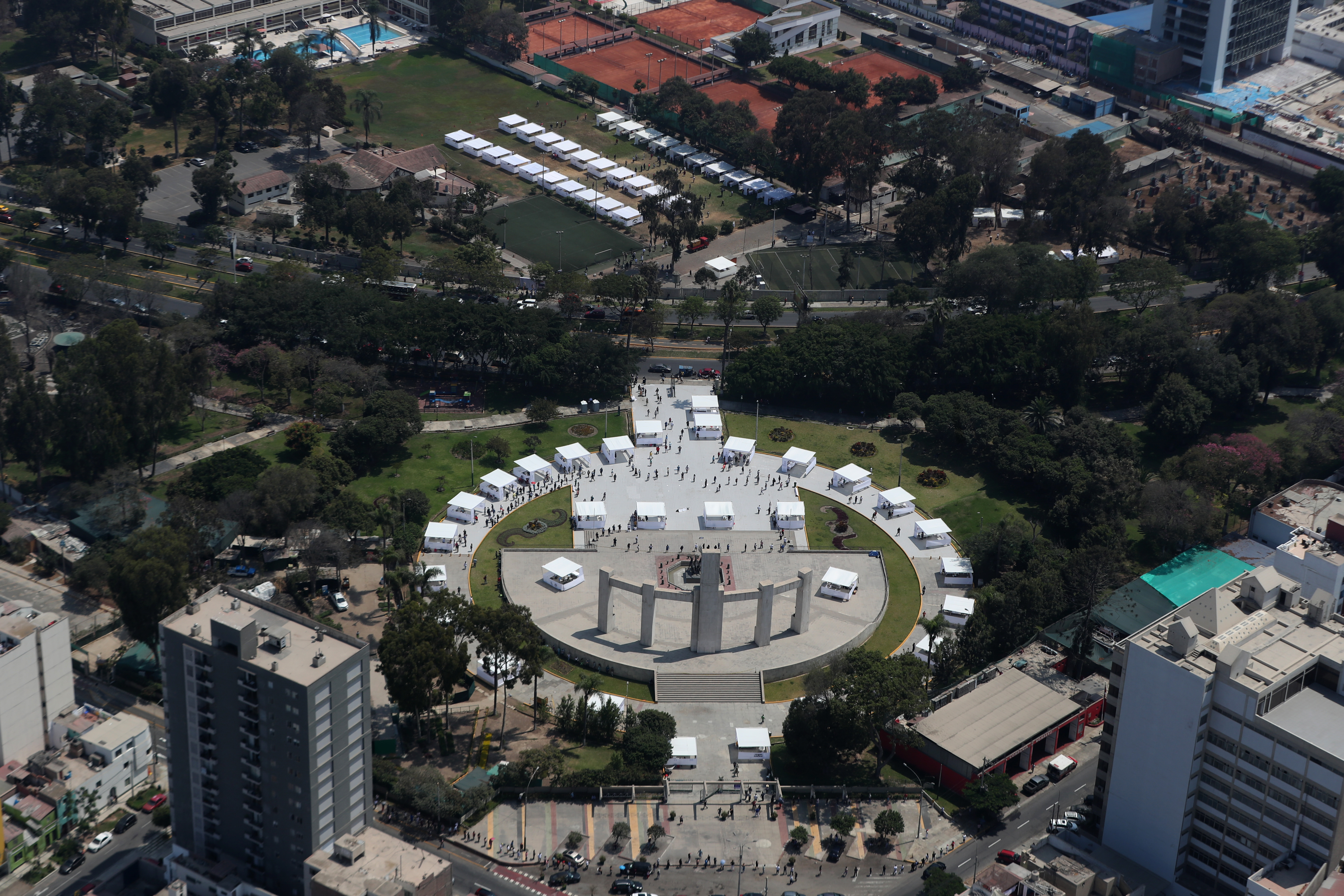
Heroes of Independence Park

== See also ==
- Revolutionary Government of the Armed Forces of Peru
- Centennial of the Independence of Peru
- Bicentennial of the Independence of Peru
