= Juan Fermín de San Martín =

Spanish soldier

Juan Fermín Rafael de San Martín y Matorras (Governorate of the Río de la Plata, Viceroyalty of Peru - February 5, 1774 - Manila, Philippines, July 17, 1822) was a Spanish soldier, and a brother of José de San Martín who was the leader of the Argentine War of Independence, who served and lived much of his life in the Philippines.

== Biography ==
Juan Fermín was the third child of the marriage between Juan de San Martín and Gregoria Matorras. Like his older siblings (María Elena and Manuel Tadeo) he was born on the Calera de las Vacas ranch, located in the jurisdiction of the Las Víboras parish, of the then Río de la Plata Governorate (On what is now Argentina and Uruguay). His younger brothers, José Francisco and Justo Rufino, were born in the Reduction of Yapeyú. Juan de San Martin also experienced training with the native Guarani in the Jesuit Reductions of Paraguay, in wars against the Portuguese Empire's Bandeirantes, that enslaved them, before the Suppression of the Jesuits left the Guarani without official royal support. Consequently, the suppression of the Jesuit Order started the Latin American Revolutions against Spain and Portugal, with Jesuit Priests like Juan Pablo Vizcardo y Guzmán calling for open rebellion against the colonial Empires.

On September 23, 1788, he entered the Soria Infantry Regiment of the Spanish army as a cadet, and served in it for fourteen years. He then spent three years in the Prince Fernando Veteran Battalion.

He took part in the war against France from July 1793 and in May 1794 he was in the withdrawal from the Roussillon War. He fought on land and then joined the Royal Navy, where he embarked in January 1797. On February 14 of that year he participated in the Battle of Cape San Vicente, where the Spanish squadron faced the English fleet. Spain was allied to France, and the Second Treaty of San Ildefonso committed them to confront England in the framework of the French Revolutionary Wars. He remained in Brest until 1801.

Upon returning to Spain, he was assigned to the Hussar Squadron in Luzon in the Captaincy General of the Philippines. He was appointed sergeant of this regiment and years later colonel, until 1815, when he reached the rank of Commander of Hussars of the Luzon Regiment.

In 1821 he was posted to Mindanao, where he was in charge of Fort Zamboanga for a year. There he was in charge of an artillery company and four infantry, and had to put down an insurrection of Muslim sectors in conflict with the indigenous population and the Spanish authorities.

He died in Manila on July 17, 1822 at the age of 48.

In 1950, the year of the centenary of the death of José de San Martín, the government of Juan Domingo Perón sent a bust of the Liberator to Manila, as a tribute, upon learning that a brother of his had lived and died there.

== Marriage and offspring ==
In 1813 he married Josefa Manuela Español de Alburu, the daughter of a Spanish soldier and an indigenous mother, with whom he had three children. He was the only one of his brothers who had male children.
