= Salaverry Avenue =

Avenue in Lima, Peru

Avenida Salaverry
- Avenida General Felipe Salaverry
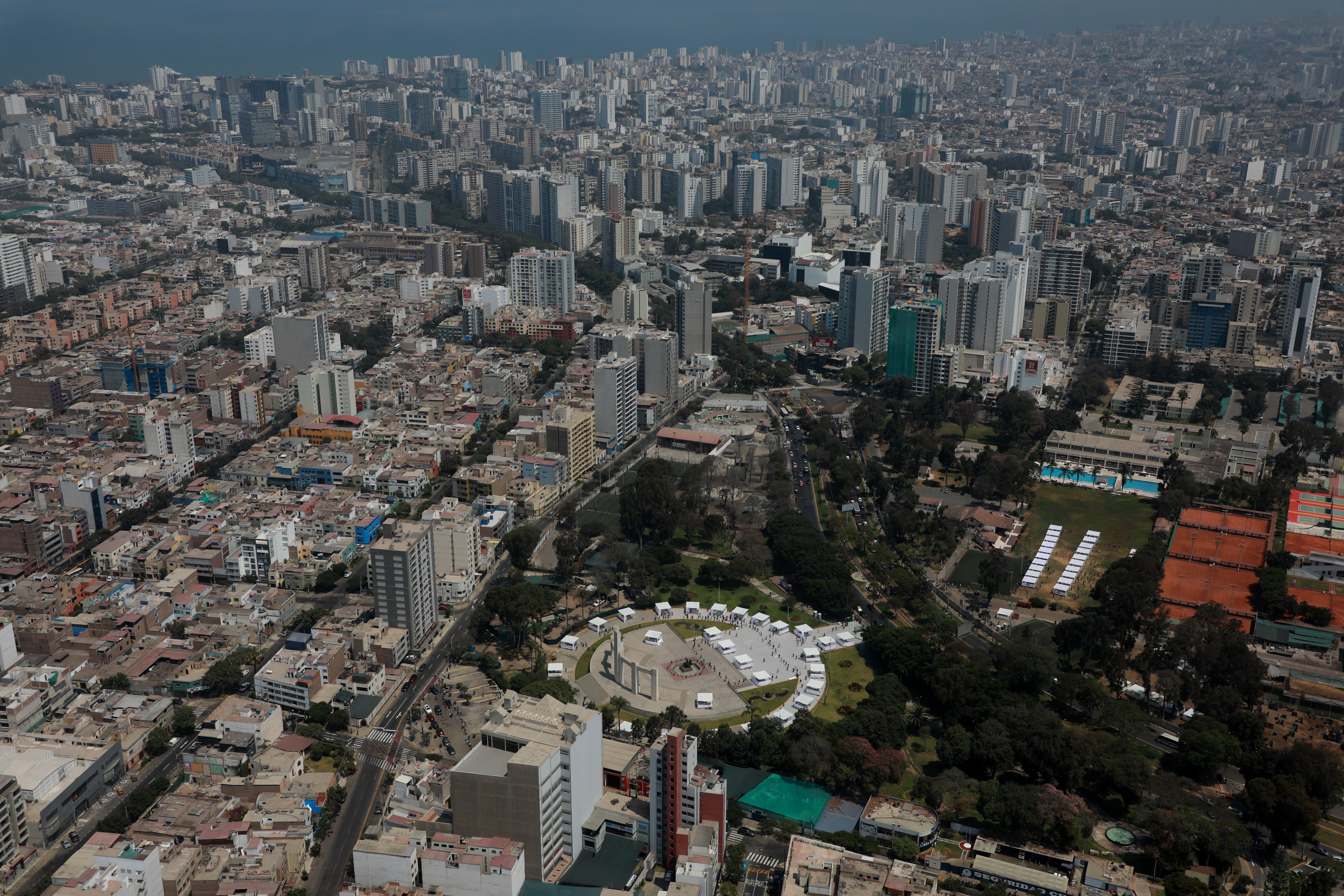
- Interactive map of Avenida Salaverry
- Namesake: Felipe Santiago Salaverry
- From: Jorge Chávez Square
- Major junctions: See list: Avenida Cuba; Avenida San Felipe; Avenida Pershing; Avenida Javier Prado; Avenida Pezet; Avenida del Ejército
- To: Parque de la Benemérita Guardia Civil

Construction
- Completion: 1920s

General Felipe Salaverry Avenue (Spanish: Avenida General Felipe Salaverry) is a major avenue in Lima, Peru. It extends from north to south through the districts of Jesús María, Lince and San Isidro along 38 blocks. It has a bike path located along its entire central berm.

== Etymology ==
The avenue is named after General Felipe Santiago Salaverry, president of Peru from 1835 to 1836. It was originally known as Country Avenue (Spanish: Avenida Country).

== History ==
Built in the 1920s, the avenue was inaugurated in a ceremony hosted in Jorge Chávez Square by then president Oscar R. Benavides in October 1936. The name of the avenue was chosen by Benavides himself, who referenced said choice in his address during the ceremony.

The avenue gave the Jesús María district a base from which it could expand, as buildings began to appear in the avenue, shaping the district's appearance. In 1971, as part of the Sesquicentennial of the Independence of Peru, the Heroes of Independence Park was inaugurated.

== Route ==
The avenue runs across the district of Jesús María, and features several landmarks in its path, such as embassies, among others.

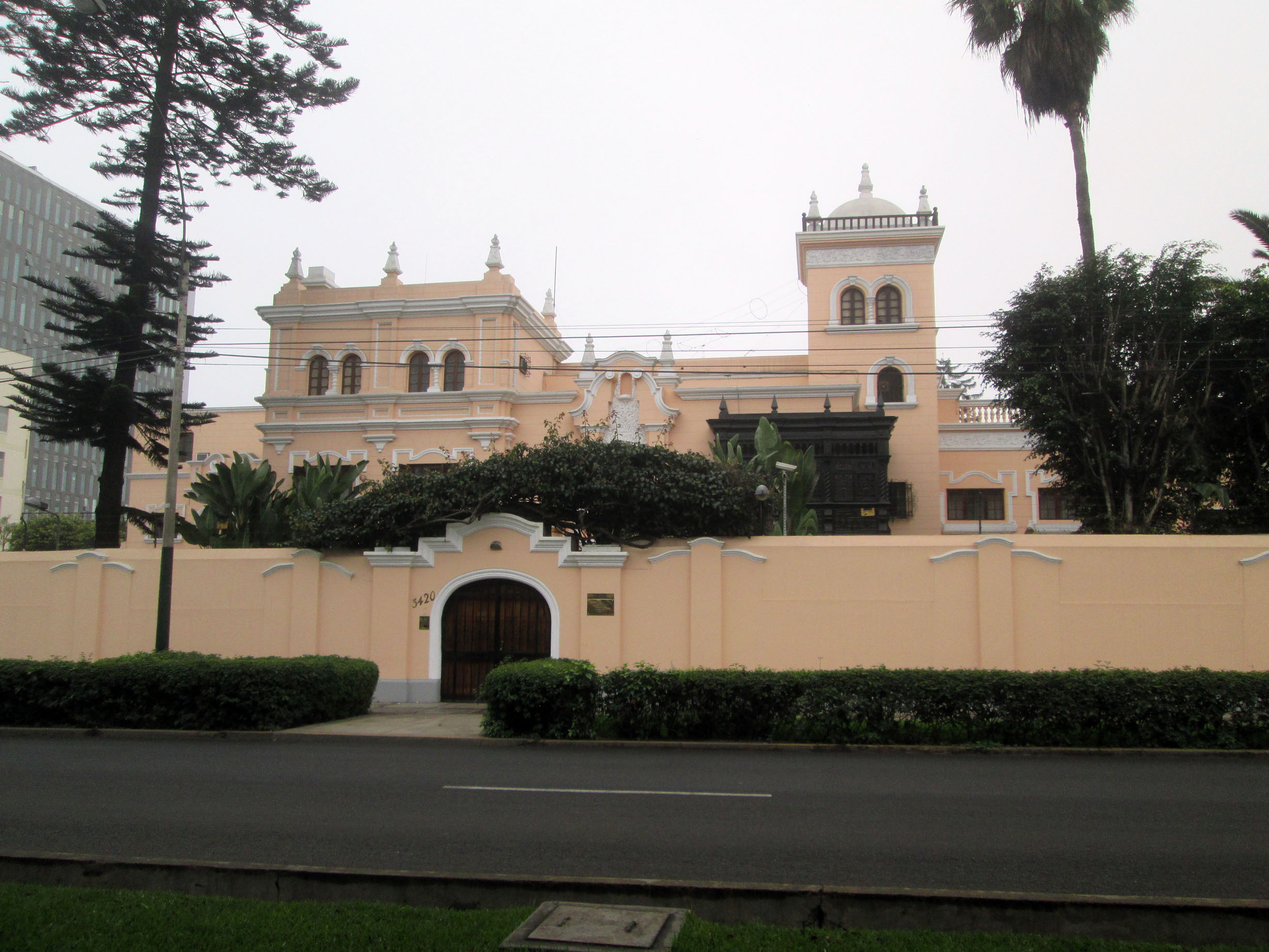
Embassy of Russia

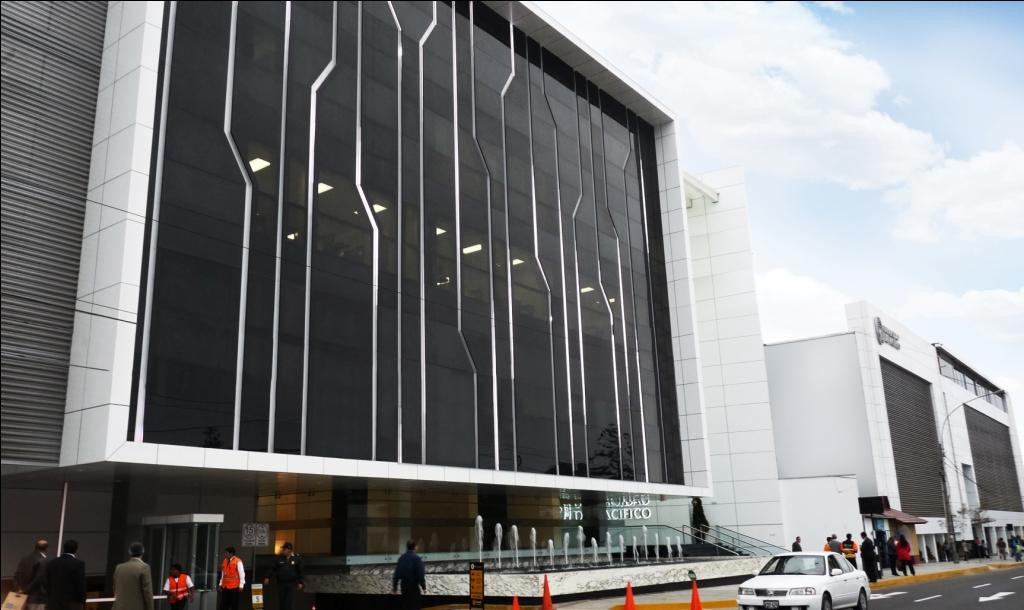
University of the Pacific

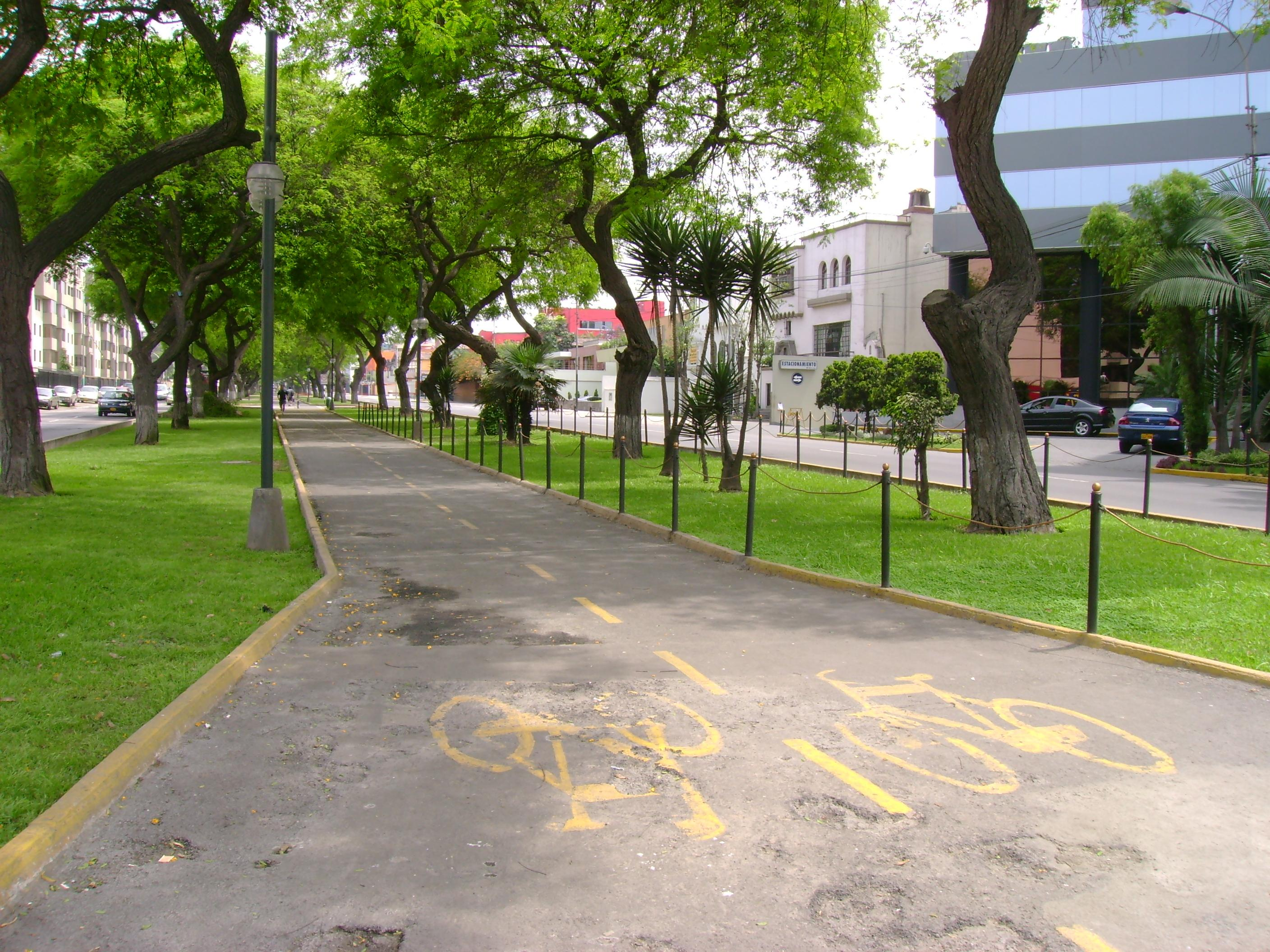
Bike path in the avenue

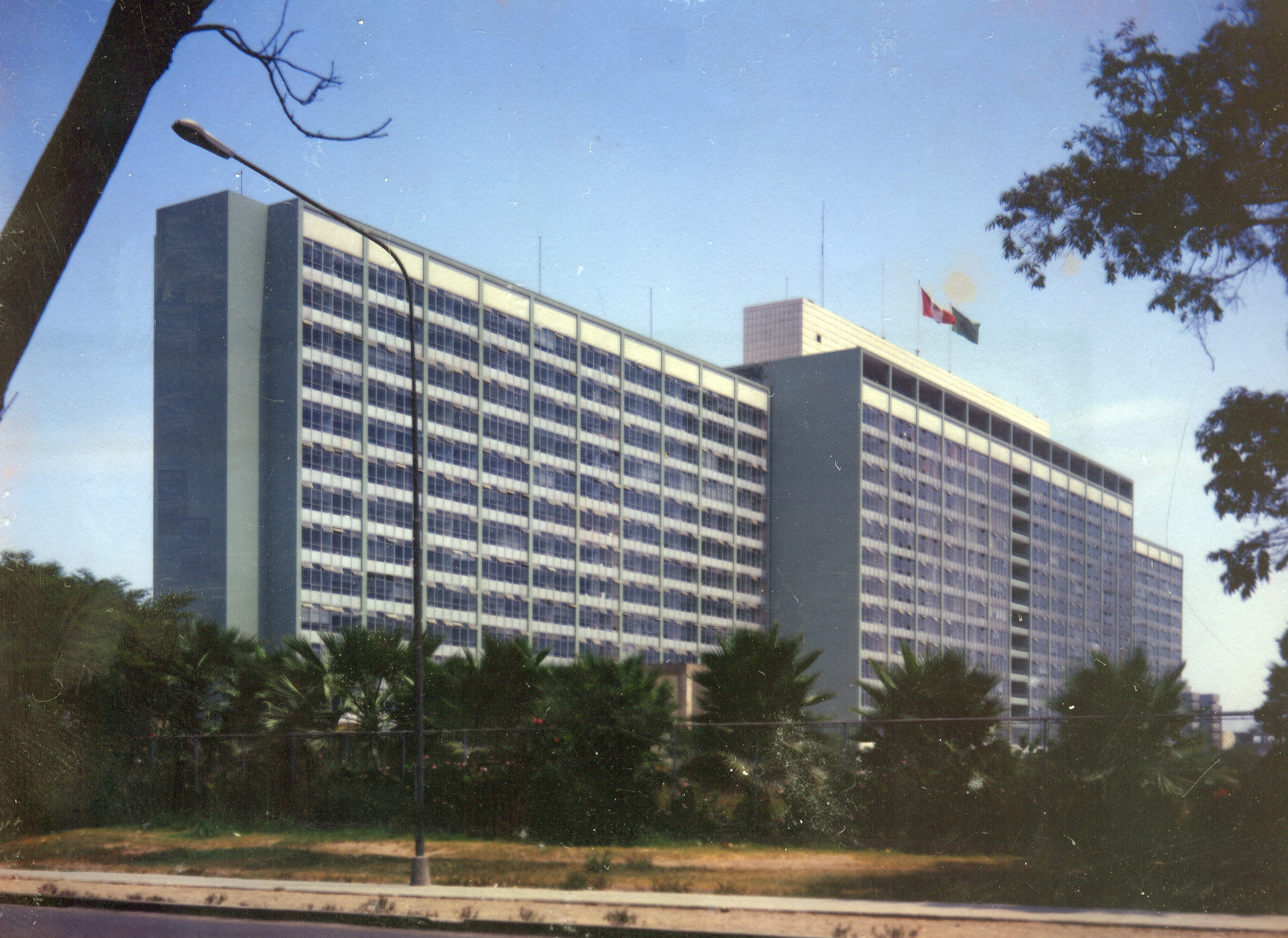
Rebagliati Hospital

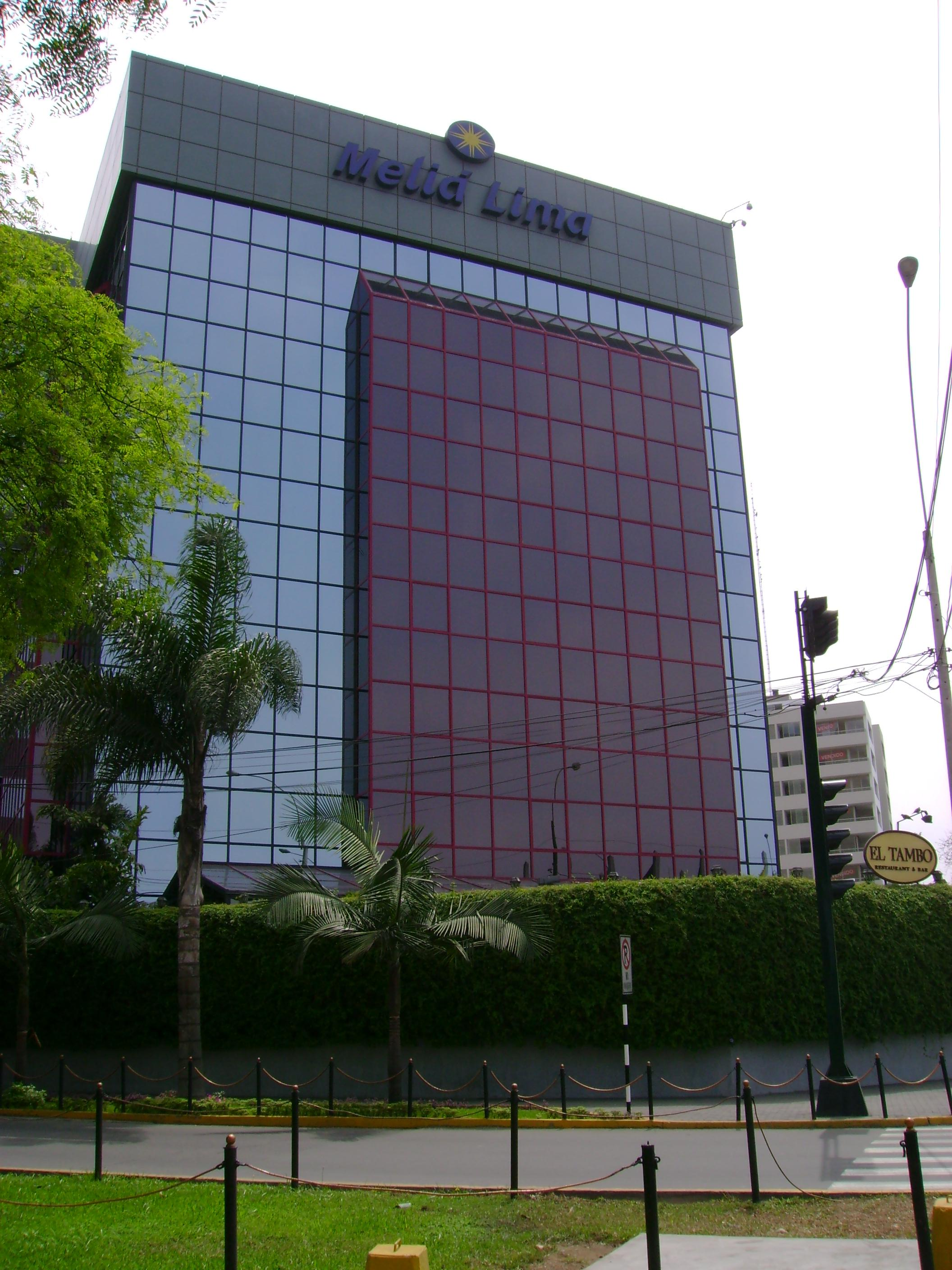
Hotel Meliá Lima

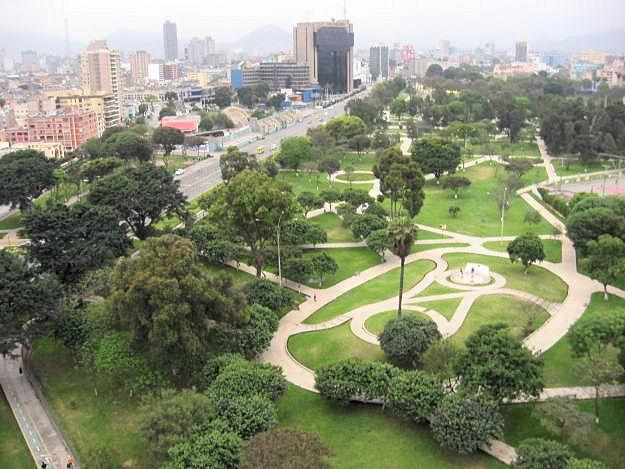
The Campo de Marte
