= Lima International Book Fair =

Annual event in Lima, Peru

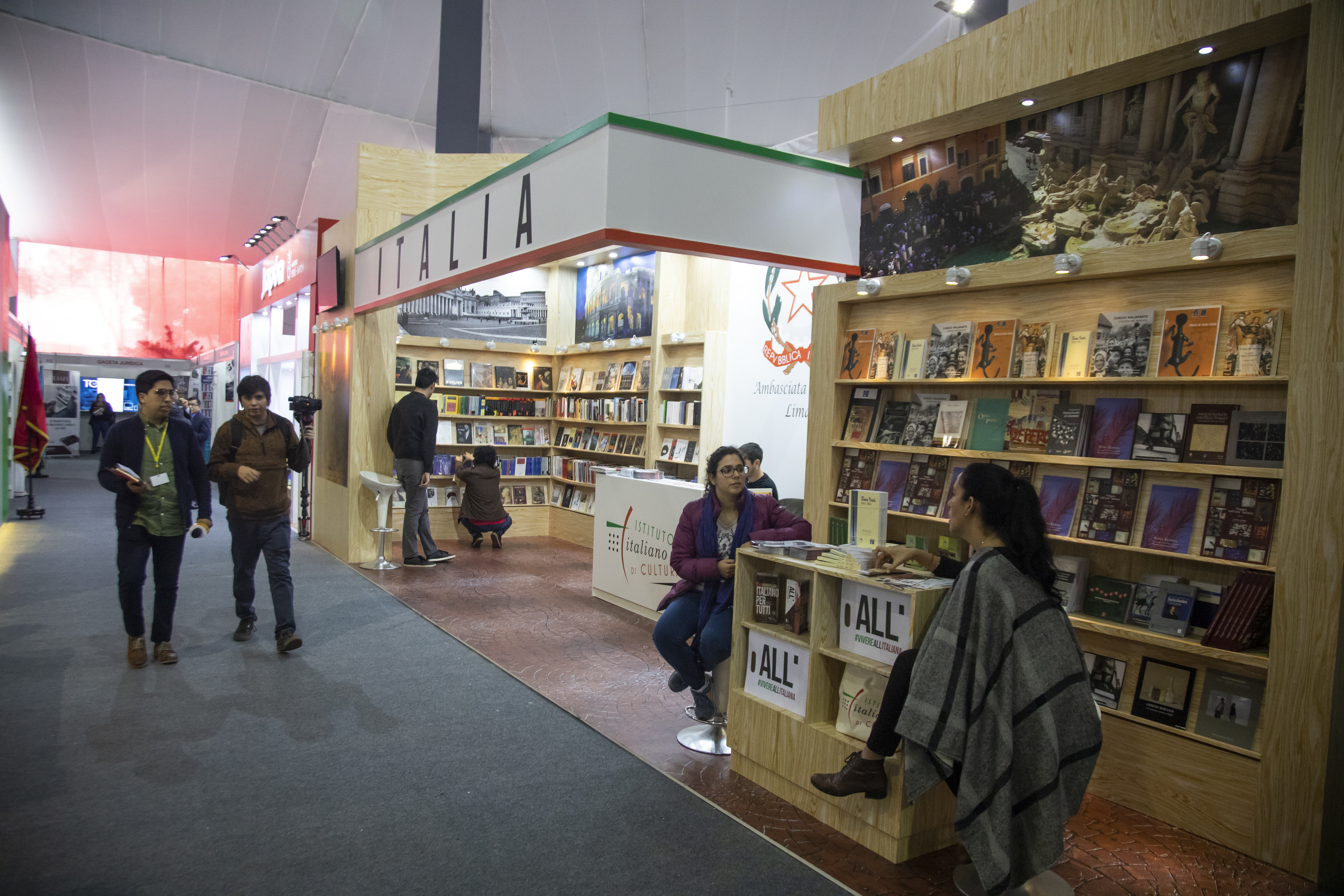
- Book stand of Italy in 2019
- Status: Active
- Genre: Book fair
- Venue: Jockey Exhibition Centre
- Locations: Santiago de Surco, Lima
- Country: Peru
- Inaugurated: 1995; 31 years ago
- Most recent: 2025 FIL Lima
- Organiser: Cámara Peruana del Libro
- Website: Official website

Lima International Book Fair (Spanish: Feria Internacional del Libro de Lima; FIL Lima) is an annual book fair held in Lima, Peru. It is one of the city's foremost events, organised by the Peruvian Book Chamber.

== History ==
The fair was preceded by a number of similar events. The "Book Campaign" (Campaña del Libro) was held between April 18 and July 27, 1960, under the second presidency of Manuel Prado Ugarteche, being the first of its type. Its participants included publishing houses El Comercio, Studium, Juan Mejía Baca, La Familia, and La Universidad, as well as writers Enrique López Albújar and Ciro Alegría. A contest included an Air France flight to Paris and US$ 500, won by Alicia Gayoso, whose victory was announced by the Charity of Lima on July 28. In 1972, another fair was held at Miraflores Central Park by the district's municipal government, named after Ricardo Palma and attended by around 10,000 people.

The first event to be held under the name was announced on April 20, 1995, by Pedro Gjurinovic Canevaro, director-general of the National Institute of Culture, who also signed an agreement that made the Peruvian Book Chamber (Cámara Peruana del Libro; CPL) the event's organiser. The event took place from September 21 to October 8, 1996, at the Museo de la Nación. The CPL's president at the time was Julio César Flores. The event attracted hundreds of thousands of visitors, including international participants. Many of its editions have been held at Heroes of Independence Park.

Its 30th edition will be held in 2026 at the Centro de Exposiciones Jockey, in Santiago de Surco, with Ecuador chosen as the fair's special guest.

== Editions ==
Most editions have featured a special guest.

№	Year	Dates		Motto	Special Guest
№	Year	Begin	End	Motto	Special Guest
1	1996			—N/a	—N/a
2	1997			—N/a	—N/a
3	1998			—N/a	—N/a
4	1999			—N/a	France
5	2000			—N/a	Mexico
6	2001			—N/a	Cuba
7	2002			—N/a	Spain
8	2003	June 20	July 6	La mujer y la literatura	Mexico
9	2004	July 16	August 1	—N/a	Colombia
10	2005	July 21	July 31	—N/a	Argentina
11	2006	July 20	July 30		Italy
12	2007	July 19	July 29	Para leerlos y conocerlos	Chile
13	2008	July 23	August 3	Leamos más, para conocer más	Brazil
14	2009	July 23	August 5	Más grande, más divertida, más espectacular	Ecuador
15	2010	July 22	August 4	Gánate con todo	Venezuela
16	2011	July 20	August 2	Las palabras cuentan	Argentina
17	2012	July 20	August 2	¡Las páginas son tuyas!	Puerto Rico
18	2013	July 19	August 4		Chile
19	2014	July 18	August 3	Leer está en tus manos	France
20	2015	July 17	August 2	¡Leer está en tus manos!	France
21	2016	July 15	July 31	Leer está en tus manos	Colombia
22	2017	July 21	August 6	Me encanta, me acerca y me conecta; Leer está en tus manos	Mexico
23	2018	July 20	August 5	Me encanta, me acerca y me conecta	Spain
24	2019	July 19	August 4		Universo Mario Vargas Llosa
25	2020	August 21	September 6	Volvamos a encontrarnos	Una mirada al Perú: 25 regiones
26	2022	July 22	August 7		Portugal
27	2023	July 21	August 6		Universo César Vallejo
28	2024	July 19	August 6		Edición Bicentenario
29	2025	July 18	August 6		Italy
30	2026	July 22	August 6		Ecuador

== See also ==
- Trujillo Book Festival
