= Mawk'allaqta, Castilla =

Archaeological site in Peru

Mawk'allaqta
- Mawk'a Llaqta
- Location within Peru
- 15°41′07″S 72°37′21″W
- Location: San Antonio, Castilla Province, Arequipa Region, Peru
- Region: Andes

Mawk'allaqta, also Mawk'a Llaqta (Quechua mawk'a ancient, llaqta place (village, town, city, country, nation), "ancient place", Hispanicized spelling Maucallacta), is an architectural Inca complex above the contemporary mountain village of San Antonio (Pampacolca District, Castilla Province, Arequipa Region). It is located 3,700 meters above sea level, overlooking the neighbouring valley. The nearest bigger town, Pampacolca, is located approximately 170 kilometers (approx. 110 miles) north-west of the city Arequipa in the southern highlands of Peru.

The archaeological project "Condesuyos" has been carried out since 1996 by the Center for Pre-Columbian Studies (University of Warsaw, Poland) represented by its director, Prof. Dr. Mariusz Ziółkowski, and Universidad Católica Santa María (Arequipa, Peru) represented by Dr. Luis Augusto Belan Franco, the director of the University Archaeological Museum and Dr. Maximo Neira Avendaño – the scientific consultant for the project. The project is being carried out in co-operation with the Instituto Nacional de Cultura of Peru and covers archaeological investigation in the vicinity of the volcano Coropuna which was frequently mentioned by chroniclers of the 16th and 17th centuries as an oracle, worshipped since pre-Inca times. The architectural complex Mawk'allaqta, composed of more than two hundred stone buildings and tombs, an ushnu and three huge ceremonial platforms, made of stones and earth, may be considered the principal administrative, pilgrimage and religious centre related to the volcano and the most important Inca site discovered in Kuntisuyu, the fourth quarter of the Inca Empire. Mawk'allaqta is being investigated as part of a sub-project which forms part of the archaeological project "Condesuyos".

Mawk'allaqta was inaugurated and opened to visitors on August 29, 2009.
