= Pampacolca District =

Coordinates: 15.7113°S 72.5614°W

Pampacolca Pampaqullqa
- District
- Interactive map of Pampacolca
- Country: Peru
- Region: Arequipa
- Province: Castilla
- Capital: Pampacolca

Government
  - Mayor: Vicente Justino Carcamo Huamani

Area
  - Total: 205.19 km^{2} (79.22 sq mi)
- Elevation: 2,950 m (9,680 ft)

Population (2005 census)
  - Total: 3,683
  - Density: 17.95/km^{2} (46.49/sq mi)
- Time zone: UTC-5 (PET)
- UBIGEO: 040410

Pampacolca or Pampaqullqa (Quechua pampa large plain, qullqa deposit) is one of fourteen districts of the province Castilla in Peru.

The District of Pampacolca is chiefly an agricultural center located in the highlands of the Arequipa Department in Southern Peru. Pampacolca in the Inca times was an important place of the Kuntisuyu, one of the four provinces of the Inca empire. The Incas used and improved the oracle of Mawk'allaqta located in the slopes of the Coropuna volcano. Such oracle has five important elements: Ushno, Mausoleum, Main Plaza, Pyramid and Callancas. In this Inca oracle they offered humans and animals to the sacred Coropuna mountain.

Pampacolca also is the birthplace of Juan Pablo Vizcardo y Guzmán, a Spaniard born in America who was expelled from his own country and forced to live in exile. From there he wrote the famous "Letter to the American Spaniards" enticing them to gain liberty from Spain.

== See also ==
- Mawk'allaqta
