= Paseo de los Héroes Navales =

Park and culture heritage site in Lima

Coordinates: 12.0577°S 77.0360°W

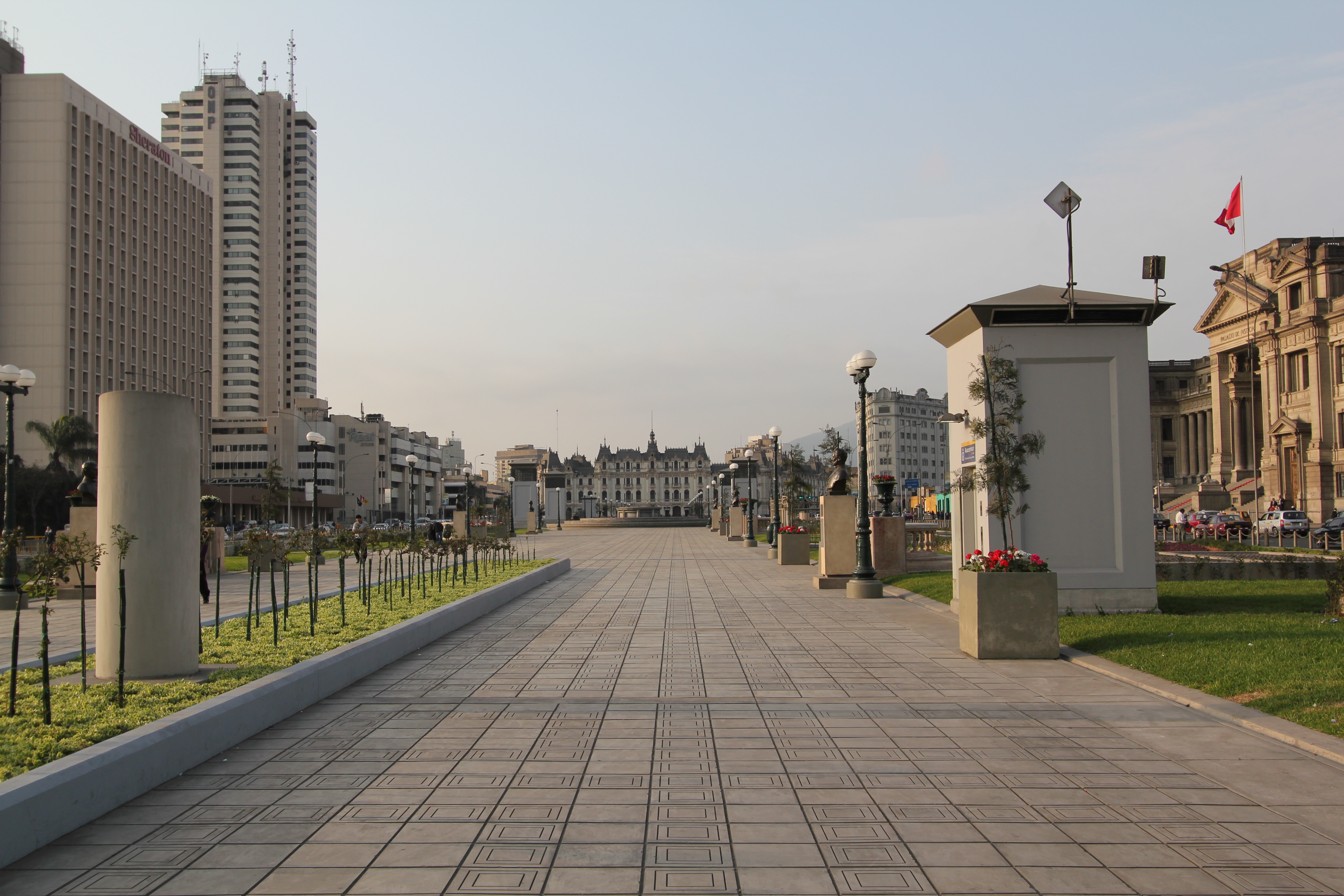
- The park in 2011
- Interactive map of Paseo de los Héroes Navales
- Type: Public park
- Location: Historic Centre of Lima
- Created: 1920s
- Operated by: Municipality of Lima
- Open: 24 hours

The Promenade of the Naval Heroes (Spanish: Paseo de los Héroes Navales), formerly the Promenade of the Republic (Spanish: Paseo de la República), is a public park located in the historic centre of Lima. It occupies the first block of the Paseo de la República. It was given its current name on October 8, 1979 in commemoration of the centennial of the battle of Angamos.

== History ==
The square was built in the 1920s during the second government of President Augusto B. Leguía and since then it has been the scene of some of the largest social demonstrations in the country. Starting in the 1990s, political rallies leading up to elections have been held on the Paseo. The square along with the first meters of the Paseo de la República expressway has also been used for the organization of automobile events.

In June 2007, work began for the construction of the Central Underground Station that articulates the authorized lines that provide public transport service on the express roads of Paseo de la República and Grau Avenue within the Metropolitan transport system that connects the districts of Comas and Chorrillos. The project, which serves one hundred and ten thousand passengers daily, also contemplated the construction of a shopping center and connection exits with España and Lampa avenues, as well as the reconstruction, on the surface, of the Paseo de los Héroes Navales. In 2008 the construction of the tunnels that replace the mixed pedestrian zone was carried out.

== Overview ==
The park forms one of the largest and busiest public spaces in the city, and is surrounded by important buildings on all sides, including the Palace of Justice, the Civic Centre and Sheraton Hotel, the Rímac Building and the Museum of Italian Art, as well as Miguel Grau Square.

=== Sculptures ===
The promenade features a number of sculptures since the early 20th century. After the demolition of the restaurant of the now defunct Zoo at the Park of the Exhibition, the four animal statues located at its entrance, the work of Charles Valton, were moved to the park in 1945.

On April 24, 2018, the sculptures of Paseo Colón were part of the ninety-one sculptures declared Cultural Heritage of the Nation by the Ministry of Culture: On February 4, 2022, after recovery work on the promenade, the ten new busts were unveiled in a ceremony presided over by the mayor of Lima Jorge Muñoz Wells and the general commander of the Peruvian Navy, Alberto Alcalá Luna.

| Name | Year | Image |
|---|---|---|
| Statues of two birds and two felines | c. 1910 | |
| La yunta | 1937 | |
| Las llamas | 1939 | |
| Bust of Fermín Diez Canseco Coloma | 1979 | |
| Bust of Carlos de los Heros | 1979 | |
| Bust of Pedro Garezon | 1979 | |
| Bust of Elías Aguirre | 1979 | |
| Bust of Enrique Palacios | 1979 | |
| Bust of Diego Ferré | 1979 | |
| Bust of Gervasio Santillana | 1979 | |
| Bust of José Rodríguez | 1979 | |
| Bust of Melitón Carvajal | 2022 | |
| Bust of Manuel Villavicencio | 2022 | |
| Bust of Aurelio García y García | 2022 | |
| Bust of Lizardo Montero | 2022 | |
| Bust of Emilio San Martín | 2022 | |
| Bust of Juan Fanning | 2022 | |
| Bust of Luis Germán Astete | 2022 | |
| Bust of Decio Oyague | 2022 | |
| Bust of Jorge Velarde | 2022 | |
| Bust of Nicolás Dueñas | 2022 | |

== Transport ==
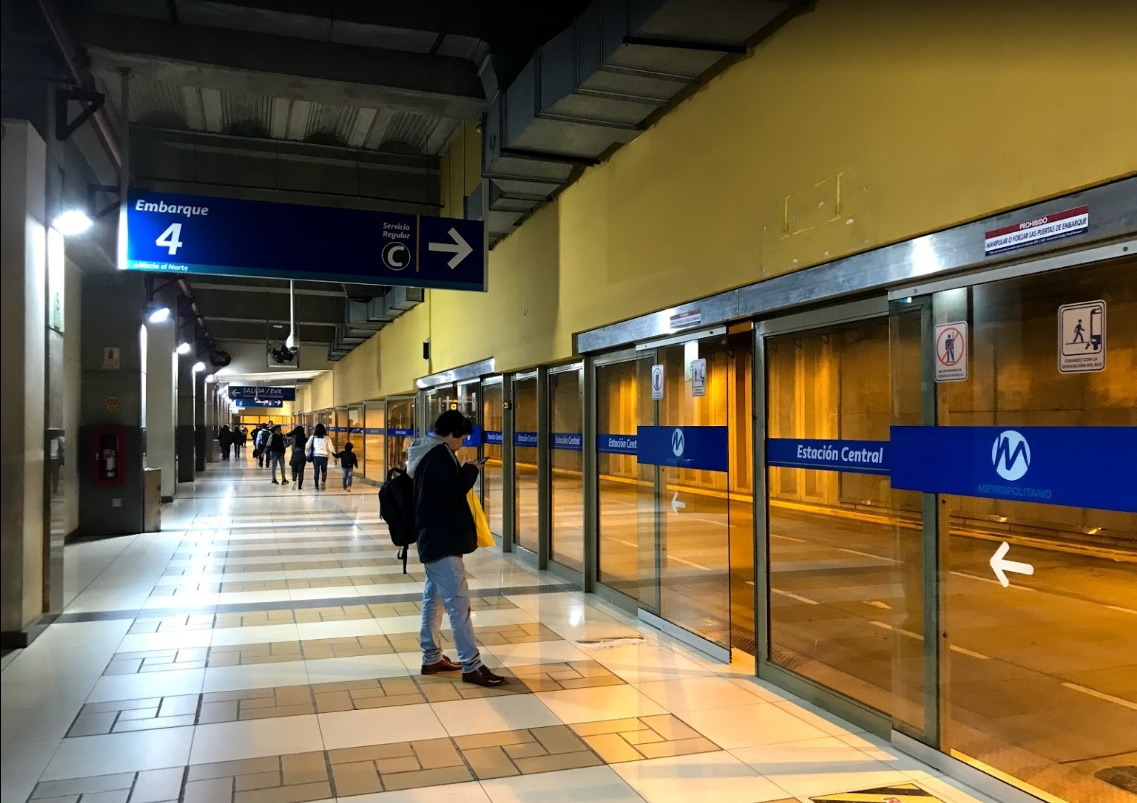
Estación Central

The park is surrounded on all sides by Paseo de la República Avenue, which continues to the south. It is also serviced by the Metropolitano bus system's Central Station, located immediately beneath the park.

=== Bus service ===
The Estación Central (Spanish for "Central station") of the Metropolitano bus system is located underneath the park and bifurcates the service's path along a route that passes through the Historic Centre of Lima. Its construction began on July 16, 2007, while the construction of the tunnels that replaced the mixed pedestrian zone was carried out in 2008.

=== Metro service ===
As part of the construction of Line 2 of the Lima and Callao Metro, construction of a station of the same name (which would integrate with the bus station) began under the Paseo Colón, on June 7, 2024.

== See also ==
- Plaza Mayor, Lima
- Plaza San Martín, Lima
- Paseo de los Héroes Amazónicos
