= Heroes of Independence Park =

Park in Lima, Peru

Coordinates: 12°04′56″S 77°02′34″W

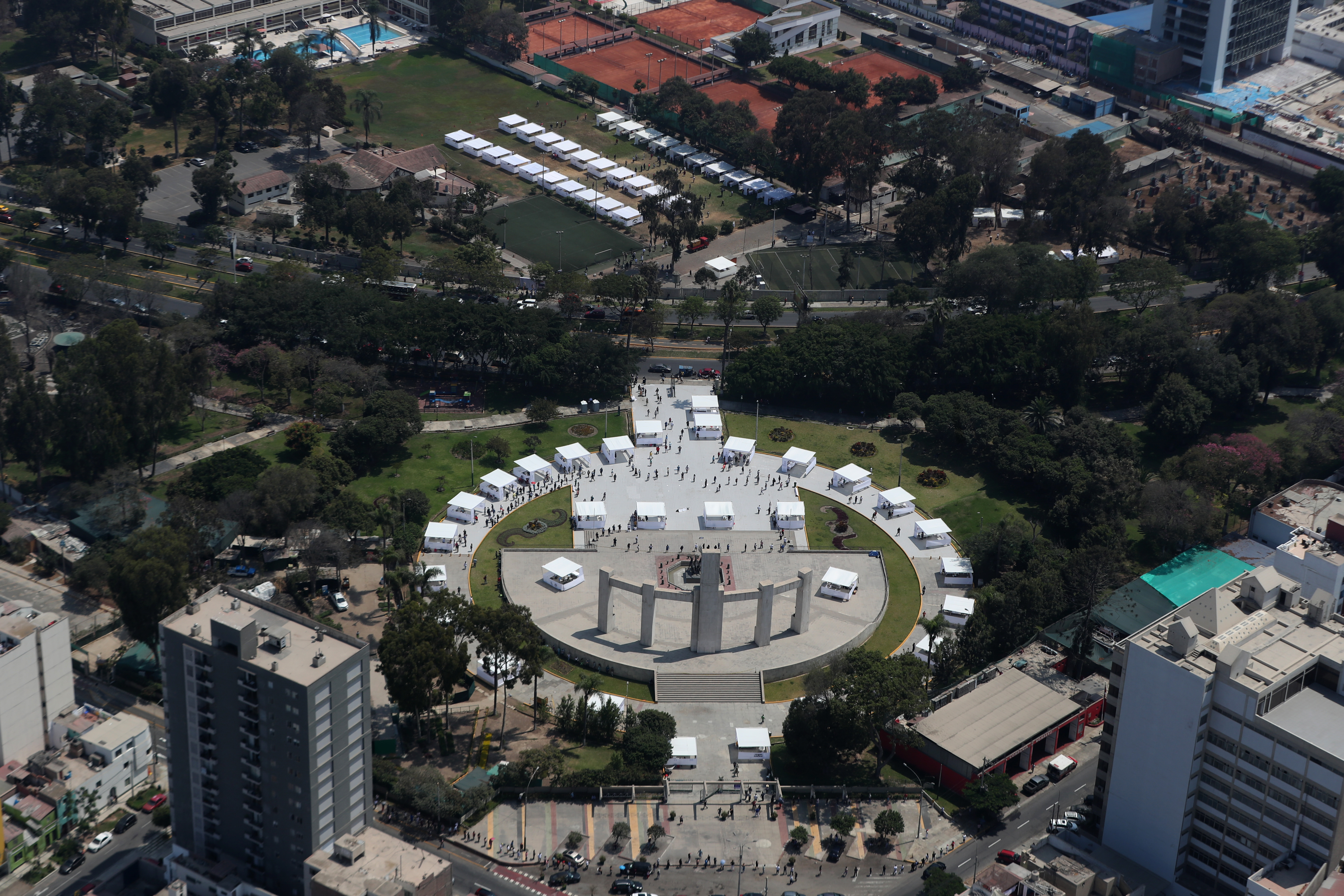
- Interactive map of Heroes of Independence Park
- Location: Jesús María District, Lima
- Created: 1971

Heroes of Independence Park (Spanish: Parque Próceres de la Independencia), originally known as Matamula Forest (Spanish: Bosque Matamula), is a public park next to Salaverry Avenue in Jesús María District, Lima.

== History ==
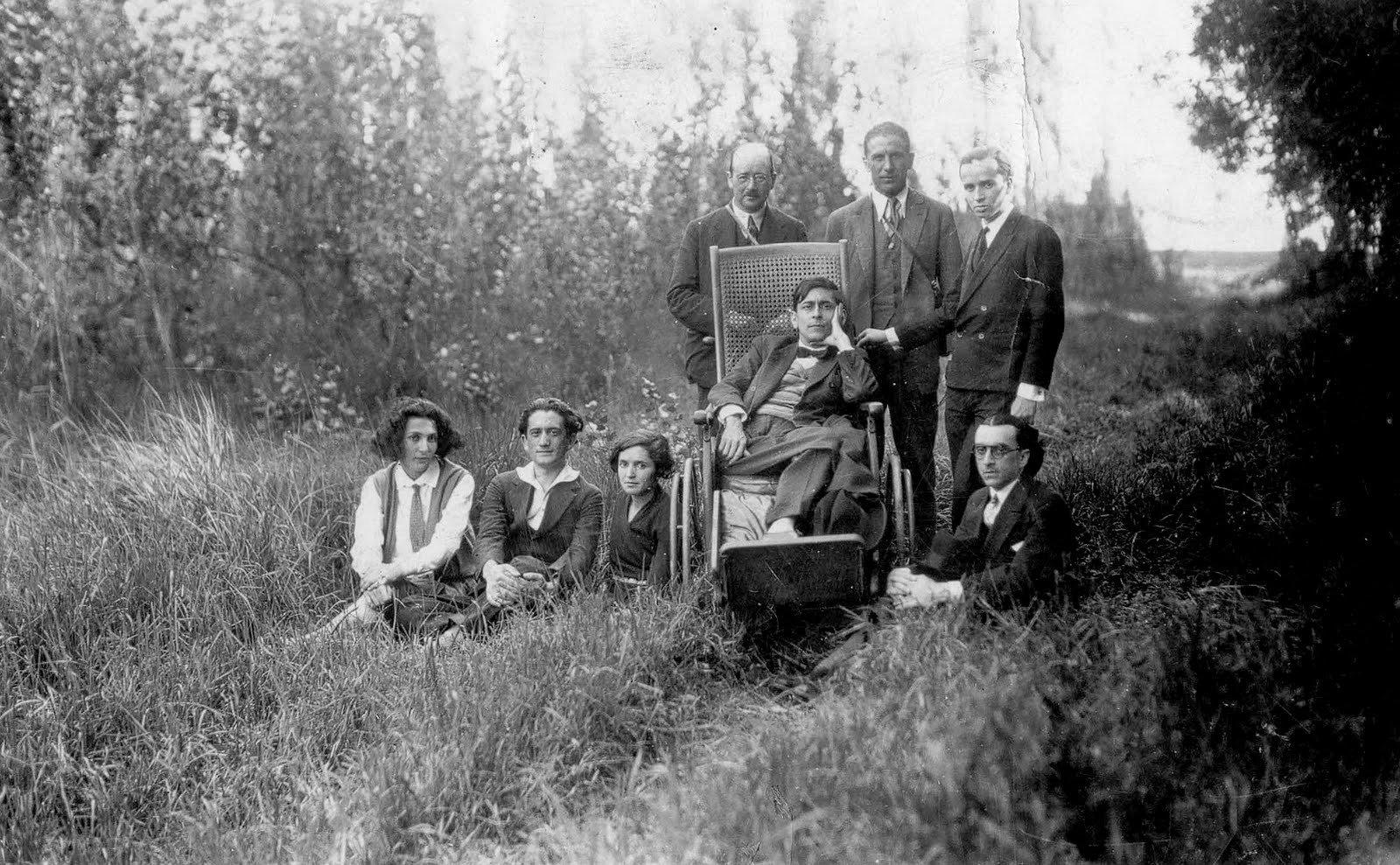
José Carlos Mariátegui and acquaintances at the forest in 1929.

The area where the park is located was once known as Matamula Forest, also known as Matalechuzas, after the fundo of the same name owned by Manuel Ignacio de Vivanco and inherited by his son Reynaldo, which itself took its name after the owls that lived in the area when it was part of the Viceroyalty of Peru, then owned by Martín de Iturain. After the War of the Pacific, the area was acquired by the Olavegoya family, who began the fundo's urban transformation during the 20th century.

The estates of "Matalechucitas" and "Jesús María" were located nearby, the former presumably at numbers 1427 and 1433 of Arnaldo Márquez Avenue, where the remains of a country house were located until their demolition in 2013.

Construction works for the park began in the context of the Sesquicentennial of the Independence of Peru. On July 13, 1971, the 3 ton and 4-metre tall bronze statues of Juan Pablo Vizcardo y Guzmán, Toribio Rodríguez de Mendoza, Túpac Amaru and Juan Francisco de Vidal were taken from a warehouse in Argentina Avenue to the park and installed as part of its monument, which features 17-metre tall obelisks as well as one measured at 25 metres, which features a condor, the first statue to be installed. The works were carried out with cranes owned by SIMA from 11 a.m. to 2 p.m.

The park was officially inaugurated on July 27 of the same year in a ceremony attended by then President Juan Velasco Alvarado. It was visited in 2017 by President of Ireland Michael D. Higgins as part of his official visit, and has also been visited by other heads of state. The park closed during the COVID-19 pandemic in Peru and has since been renovated.

== Gallery ==
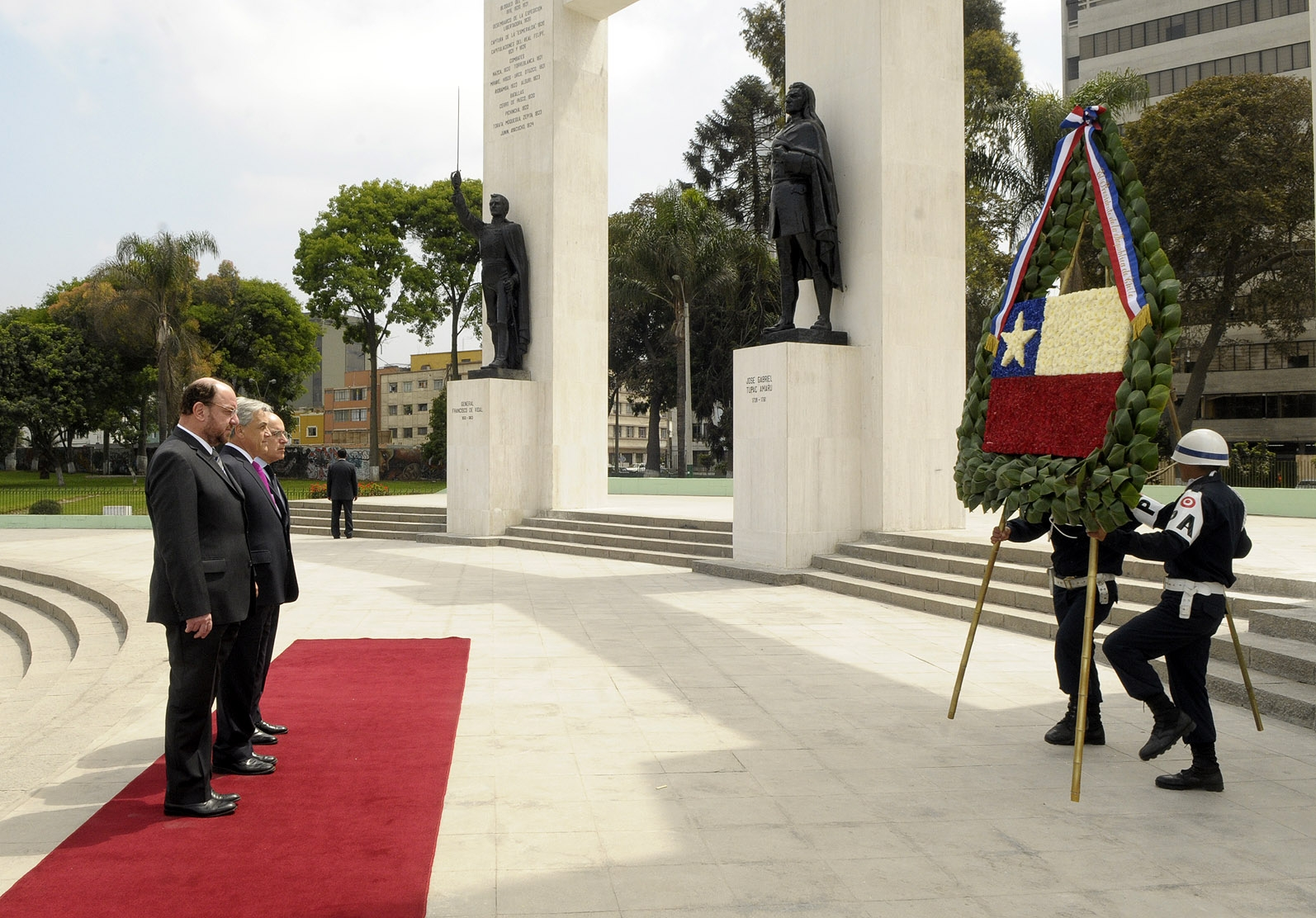
Visit by President Sebastián Piñera of Chile

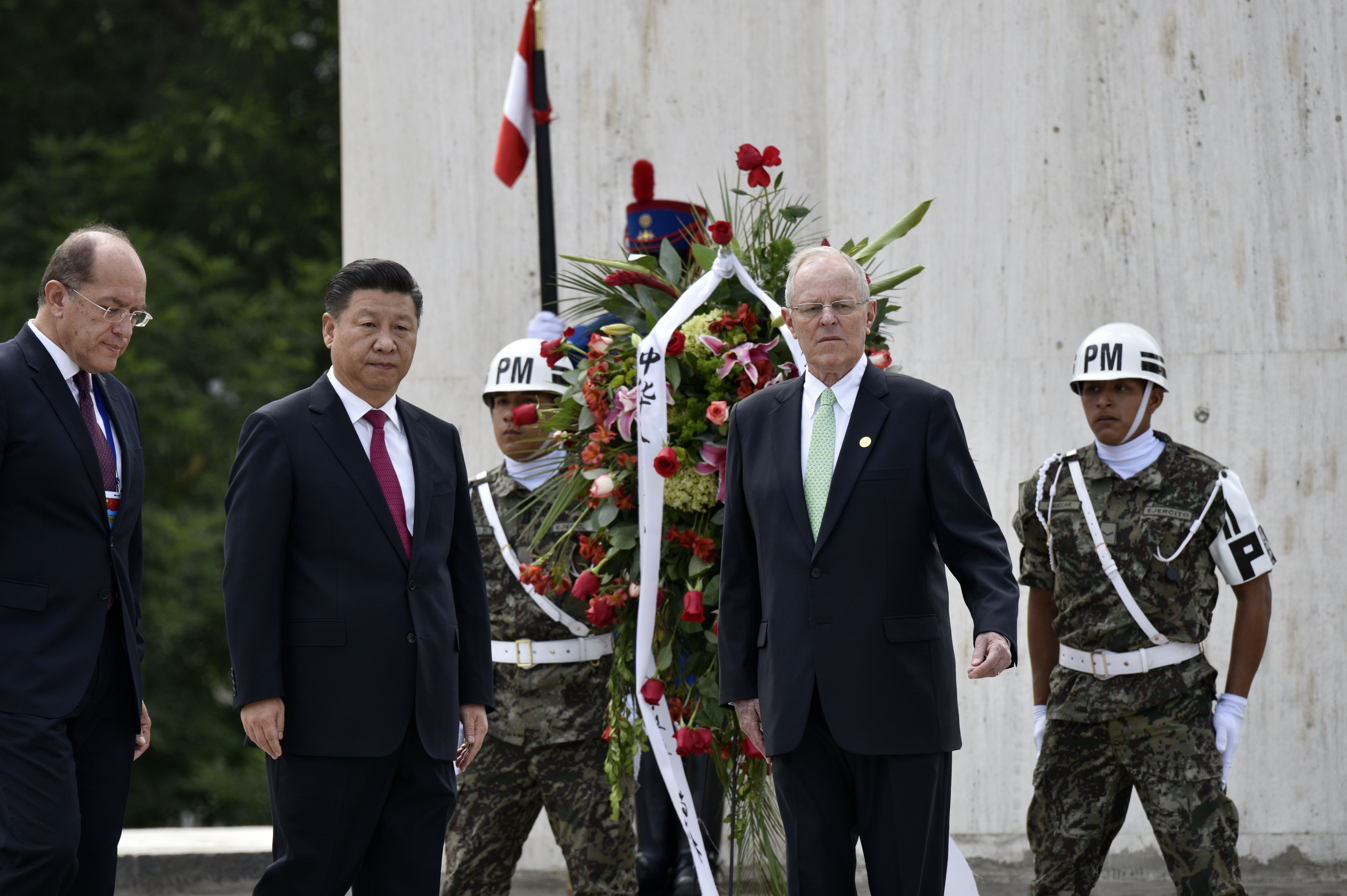
Visit by President Xi Jinping of China

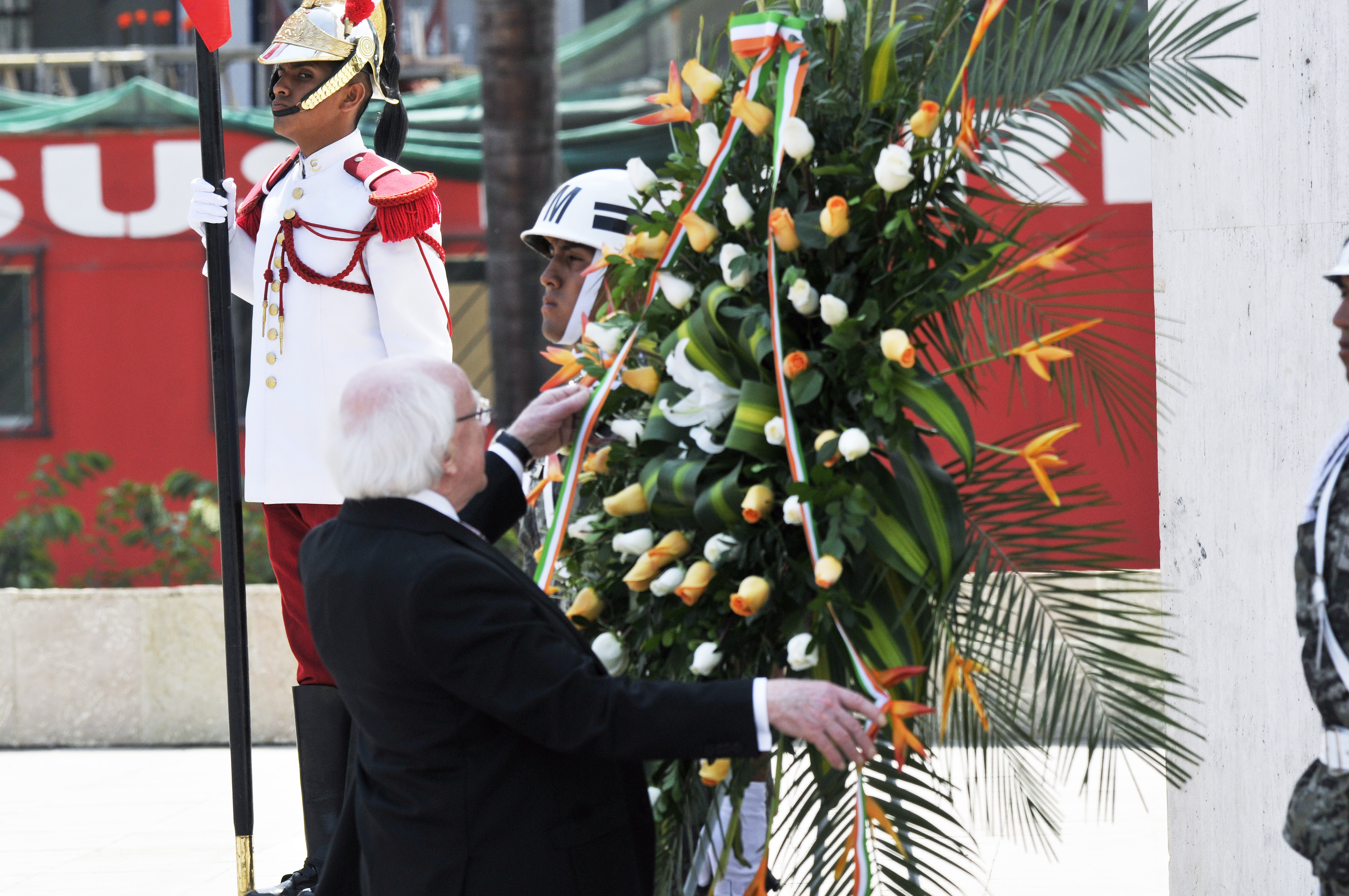
Visit by President Michael D. Higgins of Ireland

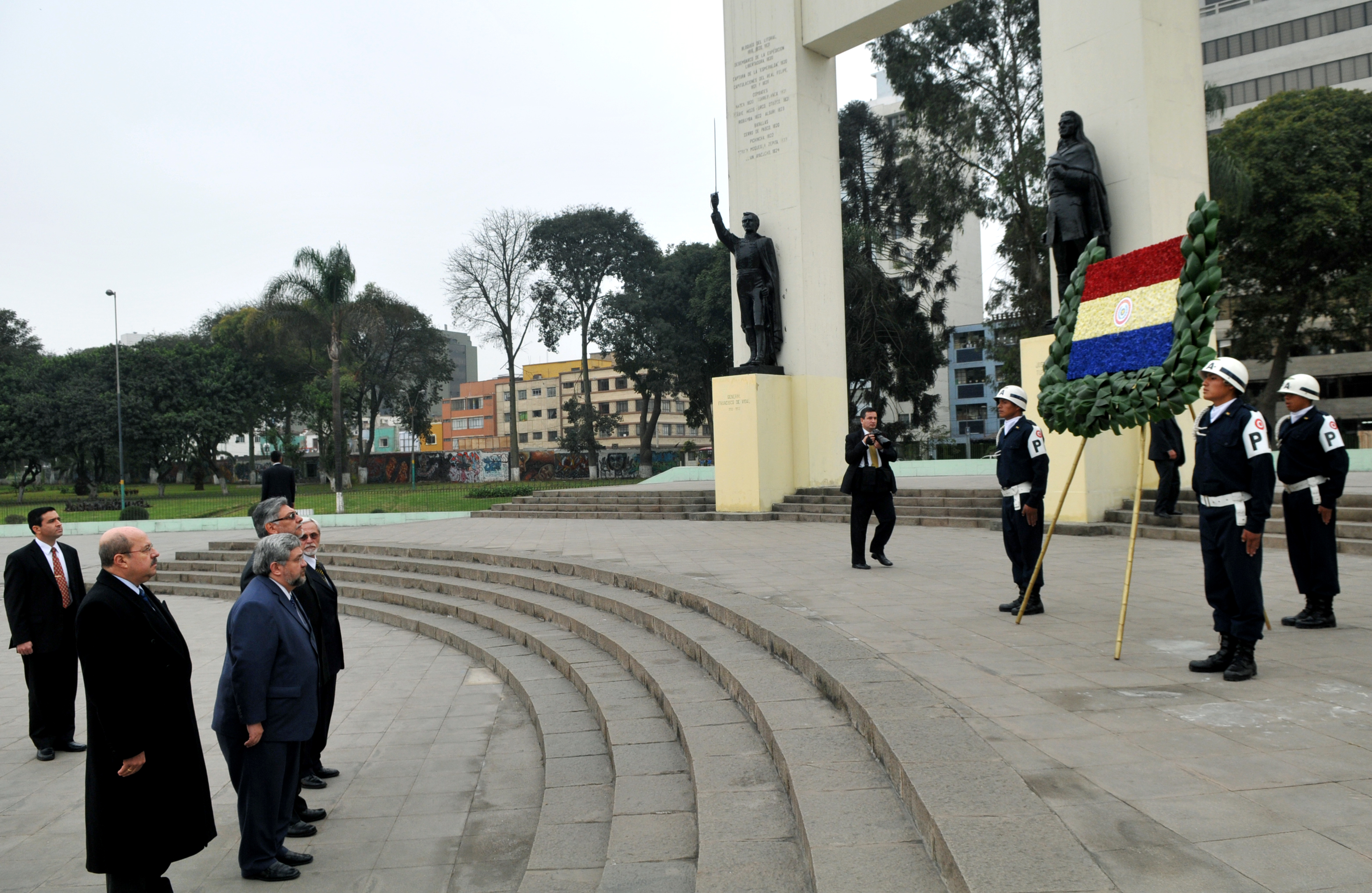
Visit by President Fernando Lugo of Paraguay

== See also ==
- Sesquicentennial of the Independence of Peru
