= Barrio Chino (Lima) =

Neighbourhood in Lima, Peru

Coordinates: 12.050957°S 77.025769°W

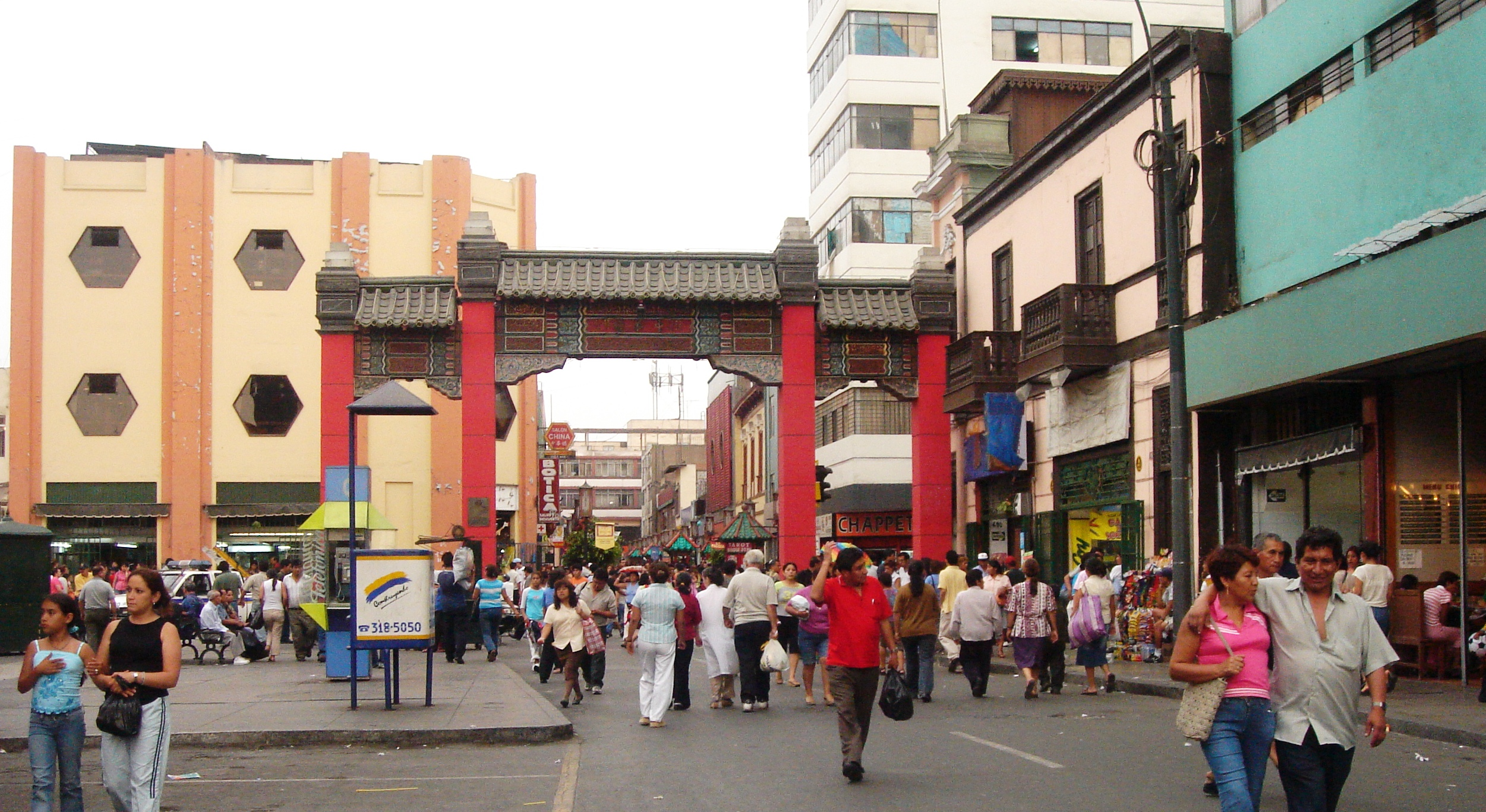
- Arch at the main entrance
- Interactive map of Barrio Chino
- Country: Peru
- Department: Lima
- Province: Lima
- District: Lima

Barrio Chino (Chinese: 利馬唐人街; pinyin: Lì mǎ tángrénjiē; Jyutping: lai6 ma5 tong4 jan4 gaai1) is a neighbourhood in Lima, Peru. A Chinese enclave, it is centered on the seventh and eighth blocks of Ucayali Street. Its foundation by Chinese immigrants dates back to the mid-19th century, having been later heavily damaged during the War of the Pacific, with further decline following the military occupation. It experienced a revival starting in the 1970s and is now a thriving resource for Chinese-Peruvian culture.

== History ==
=== Origins ===
In the 1850s, Chinese immigrants started to cluster in the area around the Central Market, then called La Concepción. During the Spanish colonial period, the area was known as Calle Capón, as it was the location of the market for castrated pigs.

The consolidation of an ethnic Chinese neighborhood was spurred by the presence, from the 1860s, of large commercial houses established by Chinese import companies from Hong Kong and California. These included the Wing Fat Co., the Wo Chong Co., or the Wing On Chong Co. Small businesses catered to the Chinese population, such as laundries, shoe shops, restaurants, and small grocery stores (bodegas).

Within a short time Chinese immigrants had established a number of benevolent societies and temples, often according to place of origin. For example, the Ku Kong Chao Association was established in 1867 by immigrants from rural Guangdong, the Pun Yui Society by Cantonese immigrants in 1887, and the Tungshin Society in 1898 by Hakka immigrants. The Chinese Central Benevolent Society, or Tonghui Chongkoc, was formed in 1882 to provide members with legal counseling, burial insurance, and the establishment of a Chinese school.

=== Decline ===
Like the rest of Lima, the area of Barrio Chino before the term was official suffered destruction and looting in 1881-1883 by invading Chilean military forces during the War of the Pacific. This left the quarter in economic disarray, in which only a handful of large enterprises were able to survive.

As the neighborhood's fortune's declined, it became the target of critiques by the Lima elites intent on cleaning up the city and of mobs incited by political candidates and racist stereotypes. In 1909 the government demolished part of the quarter, and the neighborhood was again attacked during the labor riots of 1918.

The ethnic face of the neighborhood also changed. A several-decade ban on Chinese immigration resulted in increasing intermarriage with Peruvians of non-Chinese descent and integration into the general society. This was coupled with an increase in migrants from the country's Andean highlands, who moved into Lima's downtown.

By the second half of the 20th century the streets in the neighborhood had become so crowded with stalls and street sellers that they were essentially impassable to vehicles.

=== Renaissance ===
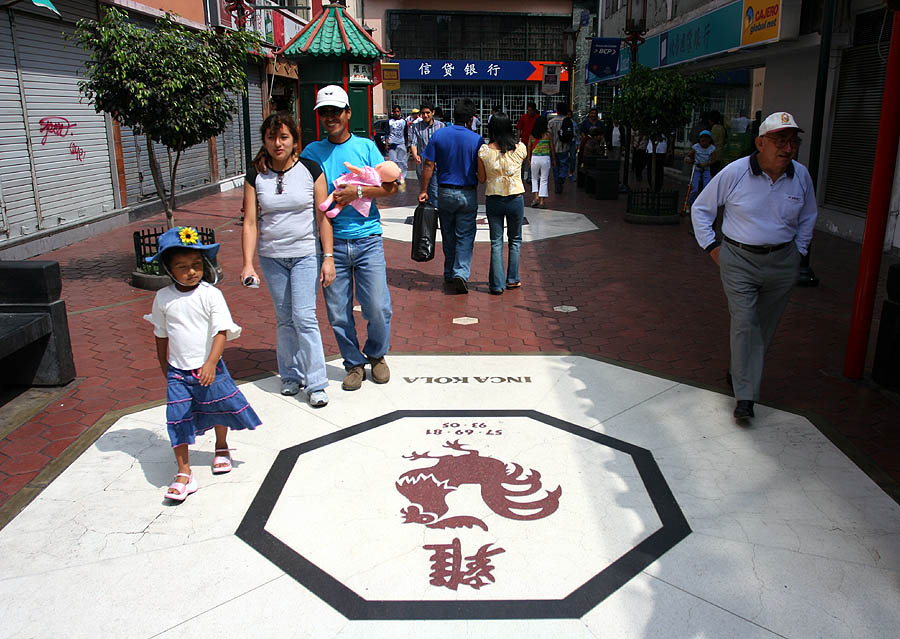
The walking mall in Barrio Chino

In the 20th century, Barrio Chino had shrunk but nevertheless maintained a distinct ethnic character. In 1971, an archway was gifted from the people of Taiwan; it was erected at the corner of Ucayali and Andahuaylas streets to mark the entrance to Barrio Chino.

In 1999, Barrio Chino was overhauled in preparation for the 150th anniversary of Chinese immigration to Peru. Calle Capón was cleared, closed to vehicles, and paved with over 30,000 red bricks bearing the names of donors and benefactors. Several panels were included depicting animals of the Chinese zodiac and, in the center of the new pedestrian mall, the ideogram for "Double Happiness".

Along with this physical renovation, the rescinding of the ban on Chinese immigration contributed to a demographic and cultural renewal of the barrio chino. China's easing of restrictions on emigration in 1983 further contributed to this process.

== Location ==
Today, barrio chino occupies several blocks around Jirón Ucayali to the east of Avenida Abancay in the historic district of Lima known as El Centro or Cercado de Lima. Its heart is the pedestrian-only block called Calle Capón, located on Ucayali between Andahuaylas and Paruro, but businesses like restaurants spread along the adjoining roads.

== Culture ==
The Calle Capón promenade is open every day of the year as a cultural and tourist attraction.

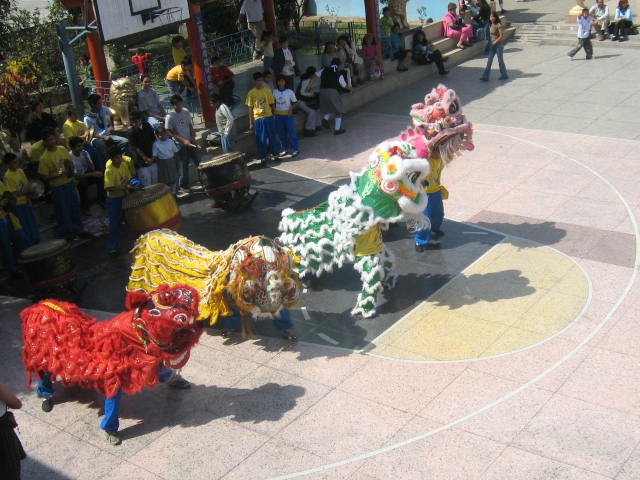
Lion dance during Chinese New Year celebrations (2007)

Traditional Chinese festivals are celebrated here. Examples are Chinese New Year and the Mid-Autumn Festival.

Barrio Chino is a source of Chinese ingredients and a hub of Chinese cuisine. Lima boasts over 6000 Chinese restaurants, called "chifas". Some of the most renowned and venerable of these are located in the neighborhood. The San Joy Lao, for example, was first established before 1920. Other notable chifas in the neighborhood include the Salón China, Wa Lok, and Sala Capón.

Barrio Chino is the headquarters for several of the Chinese associations. There are also several temples and oracles, such as the oracle of Lord Guan at the Kuan Tai Kung Temple, which is administered by the Pun Yui society, and temples dedicated to Lord Guan and other Deities run by the Ku Kong Chao and Tungshing associations.

Several Chinese-language journals are based here. La Voz de la Colonia China ("The Voice of the Chinese Colony") is published every Tuesday, Wednesday, Friday and Saturday. Ch'iao Pao is published thrice weekly and is also circulated to other Peruvian cities. Man Chin Po, the Americas' oldest Chinese-language newspaper, was published there on Wednesdays and Saturdays starting in 1911, but it ceased publication in 2002.

== See also ==
- Chinese Peruvians
- Chifa
