= La yunta =

Monument in Lima

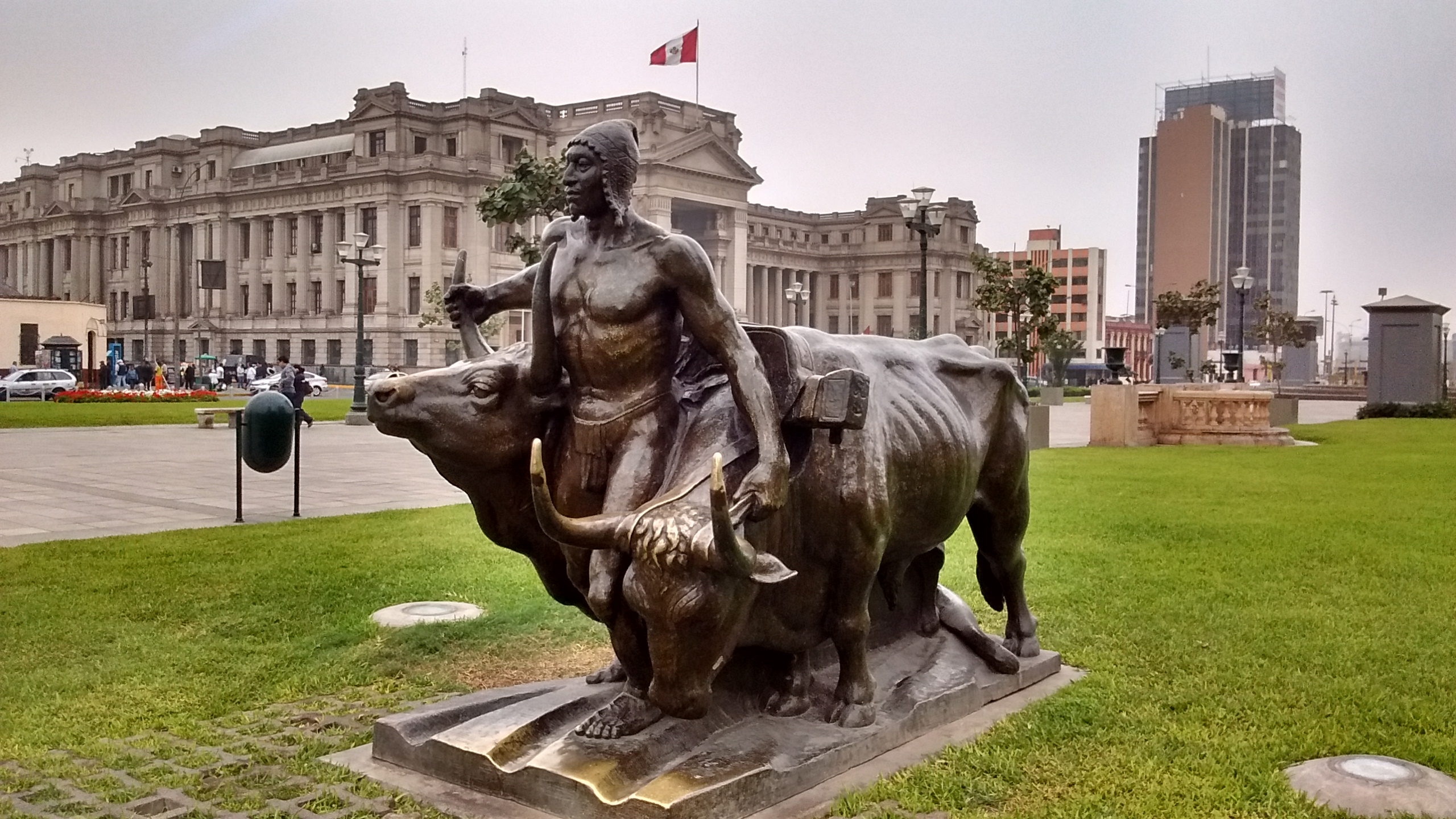
- Interactive map of La yunta
- Location: Paseo de los Héroes Navales
- Coordinates: 12°03′24″S 77°02′10″W
- Designer: Ismael Pozo Velit
- Material: Bronze

La yunta, also known as El trabajo or Los bueyes, is a bronze sculpture in the Paseo de los Héroes Navales, Lima, Peru.

== Description ==
The sculpture represents the moment in which a farmer works the land with two yoked oxen and a plough. It is an indigenous motif that was commissioned by the Chinese colony in Peru, together with the sculpture Las llamas by Agustín Rivera, as a gift to the city of Lima for the fourth centenary of the Spanish foundation of Lima.

It was located on the Paseo de la República in 1937, although successive reforms of the place made it lose the pedestal.

On April 24, 2018, the sculptures of the Paseo de los Héroes Navales, including Las Llamas, were declared the Cultural heritage of Peru by the Ministry of Culture.

== See also ==
- Paseo de los Héroes Navales
  - Las llamas
