= Las llamas =

Monument in Lima

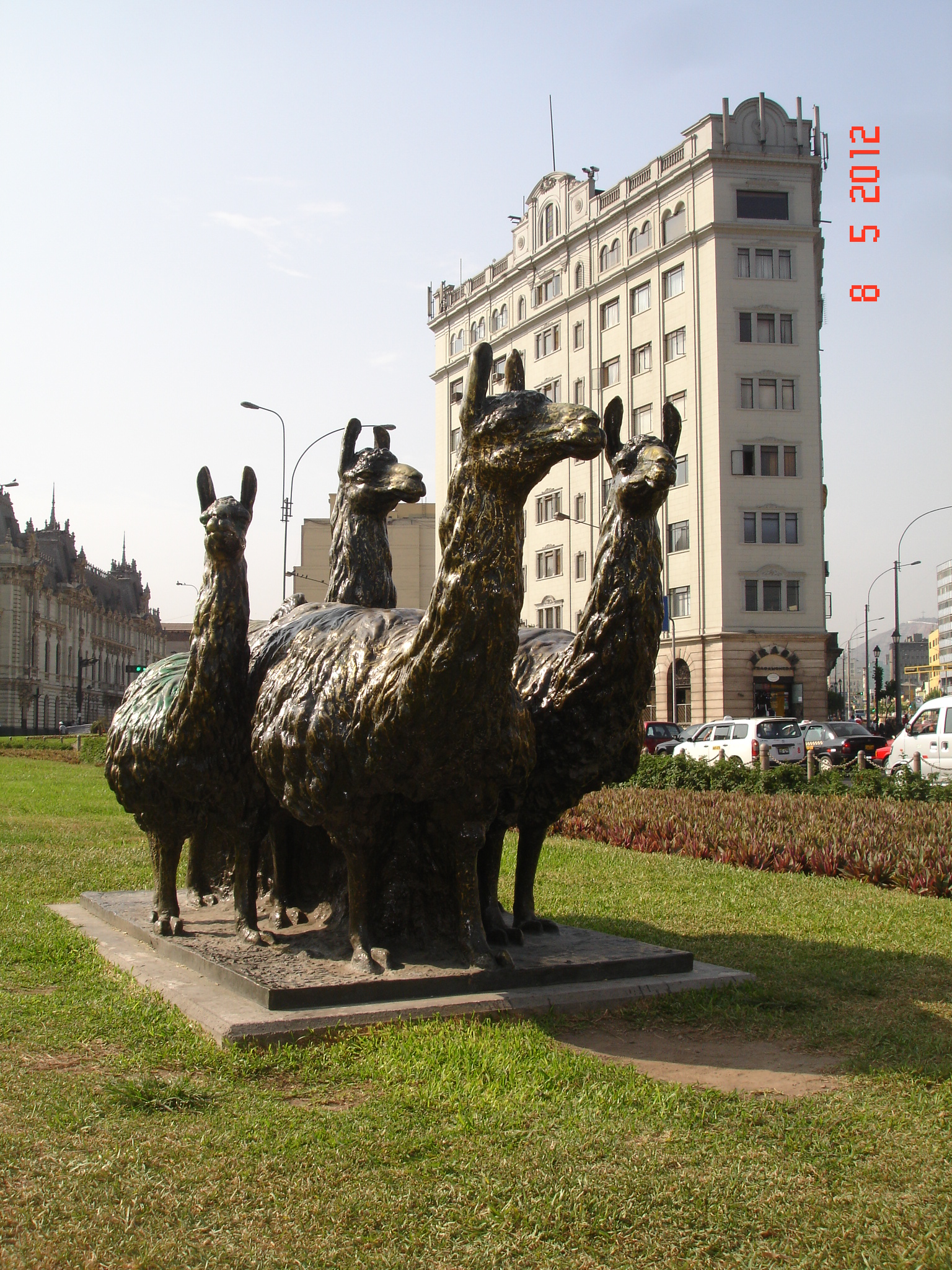
- Location: Paseo de los Héroes Navales
- Designer: Agustín Rivera Eyzaguirre
- Material: Bronze

Las llamas is a sculpture by Agustín Rivera Eyzaguirre located on the Paseo de los Héroes Navales in Lima, Peru. It was a gift from the Chinese colony in Peru for the fourth centenary of the Spanish foundation of Lima.

== Description ==
The statue is a sculptural monument made of bronze that includes a set of sculptures made up of four representations of llamas in a round shape, they are standing with their gaze oriented to the south side. In the lower part, there is a metal base that serves as a support for the sculptural ensemble.

On April 24, 2018, the sculptures of the Paseo de los Héroes Navales, including Las Llamas, were declared Cultural heritage of Peru by the Ministry of Culture.

== See also ==
- Paseo de los Héroes Navales
  - La yunta
