= Juan Pablo Vizcardo y Guzmán =

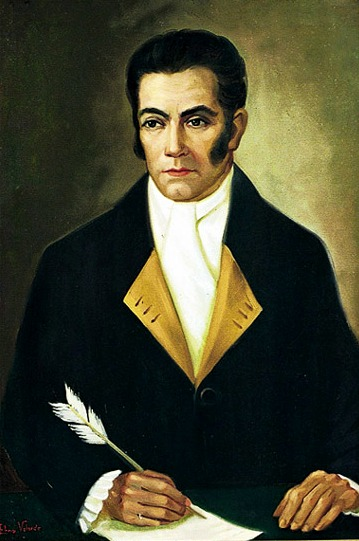

Juan Pablo Viscardo y Guzmán (Pamapcolca, Arequipa, Peru 26 June of 1748– London, 10 February of 1798) was a Peruvian Jesuit, writer and campaigner for Latin American independence. He is widely recognised as a precursor of Peruvian independence and more widely, as an ardent opponent of Spanish colonialism in America. He played a crucial role in the development of British-Latin American relations.

Born in Pampacolca District, Peru to a Spanish colonial family, he was expelled from his own country and forced to live in exile. In 1791 he came to London, sponsored by the British Government to give account of the development of Latin America's pursuit of independence.

Guzman wrote several important essays during his time in London promoting freedom for the Spanish Colonies, including "Letter to Spanish Americans" (1792) and "Peace and Prosperity in a New World" (1796), in which he criticises Spanish colonialism and its economic control.

While living in London, Guzmán met Francisco de Miranda who translated his key manuscripts.

Juan Pablo Viscardo y Guzmán died in London in 1798 at the age of 50. There is a memorial plaque at the site, which is now 185 Baker Street.
