= Misti =

Stratovolcano in Peru

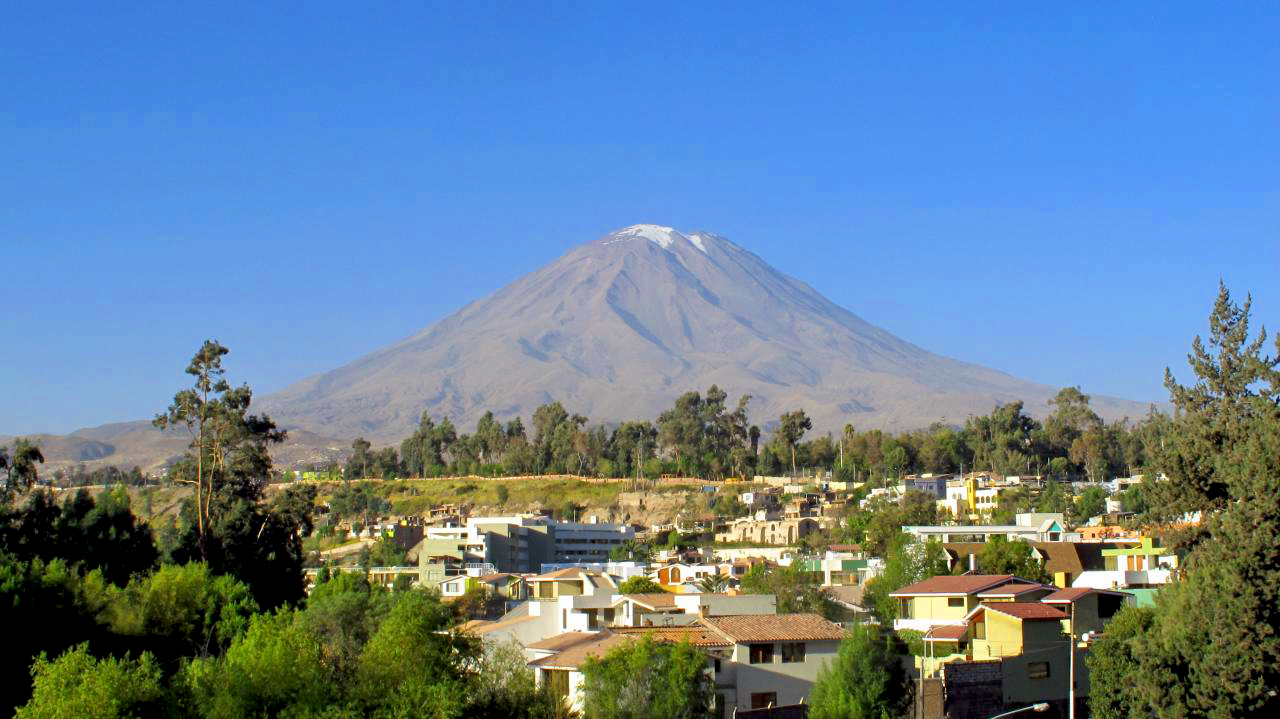
- Misti as viewed from Arequipa

Highest point
- Elevation: 5,822 m (19,101 ft)
- Coordinates: 16°17′47″S 71°24′38″W

Geography
- Location within Peru
- Country: Peru
- Region: Arequipa
- Parent range: Andes

Geology
- Mountain type: Stratovolcano
- Volcanic zone: Central Volcanic Zone

Misti is a volcano in the southern Peruvian Andes, rising above Arequipa, Peru's second-largest city. It has a steep conical profile and two nested summit craters. The inner crater contains an active lava plug or dome, pierced by vents that emit volcanic gases. The summit reaches 5,822 metres (19,101 ft) above sea level, on the rim of the outer crater. Snow covers the summit but does not persist, and there are no glaciers. The upper slopes are largely barren, while lower elevations support scrub and other bushy vegetation.

The volcano grew in four stages. Each stage built the mountain with lava flows and domes, then ended with a summit collapse that formed a bowl-shaped depression. Misti forms a local volcanic group with Chachani to the northwest and Pichu Pichu to the southeast, built on debris from older volcanoes. Over the past 50,000 years, numerous intense explosive eruptions have covered the surrounding terrain with tephra (rocks fragmented by volcanic eruptions). The last two significant eruptions were 2,000 years ago and in 1440–1470 AD; since then, periods of increased gas release have sometimes been mistaken for eruptions.

Misti is considered one of the most dangerous volcanoes in the world, as it lies only 12 kilometres (7.5 mi) from Arequipa. The city's population exceeds one million people and its northeastern suburbs have expanded onto the slopes of the volcano. Narrow valleys on its western and southern flanks pose particular threats, as mudflows and fast-moving flows of hot volcanic debris could be channelled into the urban area and into important infrastructure, like hydropower plants. Even moderate eruptions can deposit volcanic ash and tephra over most of the city. Until 2005, there was little awareness or monitoring of the volcano. Since then, the Peruvian Geological, Mining and Metallurgical Institute (INGEMMET) has established a volcano observatory in Arequipa, runs public-awareness campaigns, and has published hazard maps. The Inca viewed the volcano as a threat and during the 1440–1470 eruption offered human sacrifices (capacocha) on Misti and neighbouring mountains to placate the volcano; the mummies on Misti form the largest known Inca human sacrifice.

== Name and settlement history ==
The name "Misti" may derive from either Quechuan or Spanish. It means 'mixed', 'mestizo' or 'white' and may refer to the volcano's snow cover. In Spanish the name is arthrous (written with the definite article el, as el Misti) and some English sources call it "El Misti". Indigenous names include Putina, meaning 'mountain that growls' in the Puquina language, while the Aymara language terms for Misti are Anukara or Anuqara ('dog'). All three names refer to the dog-like appearance of the volcano when viewed from the Andean Plateau, known as the Altiplano. Earlier sources referred to the volcano as Putina; the name "Misti" appears from the 1780s onward. Other names for the volcano are Guagua-Putina, El Volcán ('the volcano'), San Francisco, and Volcán de Arequipa ('Arequipa volcano'). Some Spanish chroniclers have confused it with other volcanoes like Ubinas and Huaynaputina.

Settlement in the region began over 1,500 years ago, most likely during the time period named "Middle Horizon". It is unclear whether the Inca were the first Altiplano civilizations to influence the region or whether previous cultures played a role. By the arrival of the Spanish, the area was densely populated, and there were canals, roads and buildings where the city of Arequipa is today. The city was founded on 15 August 1540. Misti is the hausberg (lit. 'house mountain') of Arequipa and features on its seal; the residents view themselves as the offspring of the mountain.

=== Human geography ===
Misti is often described as Peru's best-known volcano and rises just north of Arequipa, being visible from the Pacific Ocean. Historically the area formed part of the Inca Empire's Condesuyos province; today it lies in the Arequipa Department.

Dirt roads heading from Arequipa to Chivay run along the northern and western foot of Misti, and those to Juliaca along the southern and eastern foot. Inca roads from the Arequipa area passed by the volcano. There are numerous dams on the Rio Chili: North of the volcano are Aguada Blanca and El Frayle, while Hidroeléctrica Charcani I, II, III, IV, V and VI are along the northwestern foot of Misti; their hydroelectric power plants provide electricity to Arequipa.

In 1925, the Italian geographer Gustavo Cumin reported that three small man‑made structures in the crater had been known since 1677, although their origin was unclear. Inca ceremonial platforms on the summit associated with human sacrifices were probably destroyed by human activity around 1900.

In 1893, professor Solon Irving Bailey (Note: Four years earlier, a team headed by Bailey had evaluated Misti as a potential site for an astronomical observatory.) from the Harvard College Observatory installed what was then the world's highest weather station on Misti. The site was chosen for its clear, calm atmosphere and became the highest continuously inhabited location on Earth for a time. The station was one of several stations built at the time to investigate the atmosphere at such high altitudes; it was also used for research on the response of the human body to high altitudes. A second station ("Mt. Blanc Station") was built after 1888, at the volcano's base; both closed in 1901 when Harvard consolidated operations in Arequipa. Storms have since erased any trace of the summit observatory. Observations of physical phenomena, such as cosmic‑ray measurements, were carried out sporadically on Misti during the 20th century.

== Geography and geomorphology ==
=== Regional ===
The volcanoes of Peru are part of the Andean Central Volcanic Zone (CVZ), one of the four volcanic belts of the Andes; the others are the Northern Volcanic Zone, the Southern Volcanic Zone and the Austral Volcanic Zone. The CVZ extends for roughly 1000–1500 km from southern Peru through Bolivia to northern Argentina and Chile. Although volcanoes are numerous in the CVZ, most are poorly studied because the Central Andes are sparsely populated.

Several Peruvian volcanoes have been active since the Spanish conquest: the Andagua volcanic field, Huaynaputina, Sabancaya and Ubinas, and possibly Ticsani, Tutupaca and Yucamane. Other Peruvian volcanoes in the CVZ are Ampato, Casiri, Chachani, Coropuna, Hualca Hualca, Huambo volcanic field (Note: Which is sometimes considered together with the Andagua volcanic field.), Purupuruni and Sara Sara; in total, there are more than 400 volcanoes in Peru, but most are eroded to the point of being hard to recognise. Ubinas is the most active volcano in Peru, having erupted more than 23 times since 1550. The 1600 eruption of Huaynaputina claimed more than 1,000 casualties; recent eruptions of Sabancaya 1987–1998 and Ubinas 2006–2007 had severe economic and social impacts on the local populations.

=== Local ===
==== General outline ====
The volcano is a young, symmetrical (Note: It has been christened the Fuji of Peru. One source calls it asymmetric, as the western side more heavily eroded and featuring older rocks than the eastern side.) cone with slopes of about 30 degrees. The summit features nested summit craters: the outer crater is 835 to 950 m wide and 120 m deep. There is a gap in the southwestern rim, almost to the bottom of the crater; elsewhere, the inner crater walls are nearly vertical and consist of small sphere-shaped pieces of volcanic debris called lapilli, lava and volcanic ash. The western rim of the outer crater is about 150 m higher than the southern. The 550 m-wide and 200 m-deep inner crater is in the southeastern part of the outer crater. The inner crater cuts through metre-thick ash, scoria (Note: Scoria are volcanic rocks densely packed with pores.) deposits and historical lava domes; it is rimmed by scoria. The inner crater contains a 120 m-wide and 15 m-high plug (Note: A volcanic plug is a body of rock with the shape of a pipe, forming a former volcanic conduit.) or dome. (Note: A mound formed by cooled viscous lava flows.) Its surface is cracked and boulder‑strewn, and it hosts sulfur deposits and active fumaroles. (Note: Fumaroles are vents that emit volcanic gases.) The highest point of the volcano is at 5822 m (Note: An altitude of 5850 m has also been proposed.) on the northwestern outer crater rim; an iron cross marks the highest point. Other mountains of the Western Cordillera, including Ubinas and Pichu Pichu, can be seen from the summit.

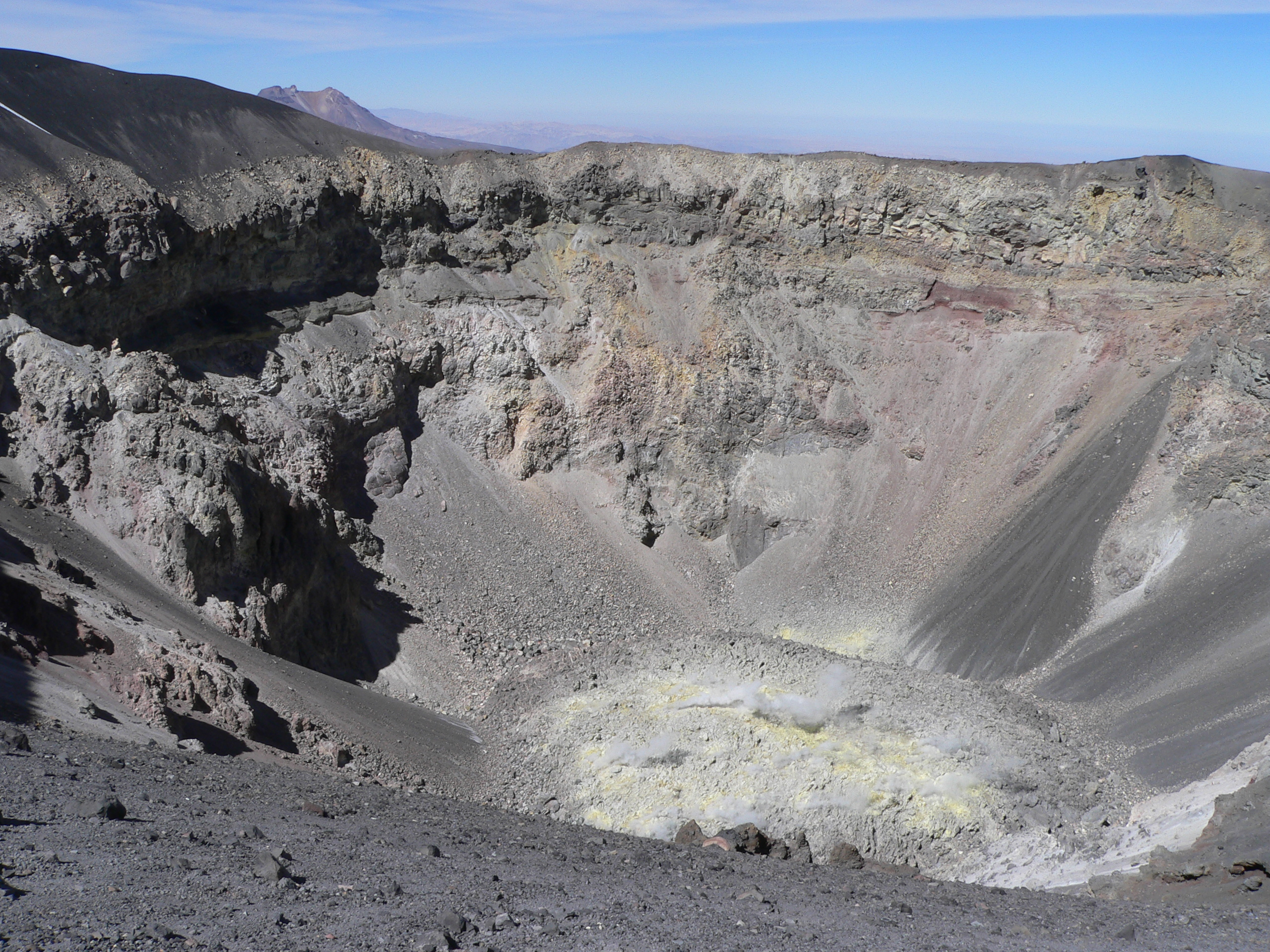
The inner crater of Misti (2005)

The volcano is about 20 km wide and rises abruptly from the surrounding terrain, towering about 3.5 km above Arequipa. Published estimates of Misti's volume vary widely, from about 40 km^{3} to 150 km^{3}. The stratovolcano (Note: A stratovolcano is a steep cone of volcanic origin formed by rock fragments and viscous material.) is made up of pyroclastic rocks and stubby lava flows, which form a 2.2 km-thick pile. On the northwestern foot, there is an outcrop of rhyolite named "Hijo de Misti" ('son of Misti'), while an older, eroded stratovolcano ("Misti 1"), lies underneath the Misti cone. Misti is surrounded by a fan of volcanic debris, (Note: This fan consists of mudflow, pyroclastic flow and tephra (Note: Tephra are fragmented rocks produced by volcanic eruptions.) deposits.) which covers an area of 200 km^{2} on Misti and extends 25 km from the volcano. On the southern side, the volcano is cut by 20 m to 80 m-deep ravines, while the northern side is flatter. Dune fields and volcanic ash deposits extend for 20 km northeast of Misti; they are formed by wind-blown ash. The terrain between Arequipa and Misti is initially gently sloping, before reaching the steep flanks of the cone.

Volcanoes can undergo sector collapse, when part of the cone fails and forms a debris avalanche. The only obvious trace of such a collapse at Misti is a narrow chute on the northwestern flank that reaches its summit. Debris avalanche deposits lie on the southeastern and southwestern-southern side of Misti, extending 25 km and 12 km from the volcano, respectively. The first is made up of hummock-shaped hills of mixed debris and covers an area of 100 km^{2}; the second forms a flat-topped terrain with an area of about 40 km^{2} on both sides of the Rio Chili.

==== Rivers and glaciers ====
The Rio Chili (Note: A river which carries water year-round.) rounds the northern and western sides of Misti, where it has cut the 20 km-long, 150–2600 m-deep and in some places only 30 m wide Charcani Gorge. From southeast to southwest the Quebrada Carabaya, Quebrada Honda, Quebrada Grande, Quebrada Agua Salada, Quebrada Huarangual, Quebrada Chilca, Quebrada San Lazaro and Quebrada Pastores drain the mountain. They join the Rio Chili to the west of Misti and Rio Andamayo to the volcano's south, the latter forming the Rio Tingo Grande which joins the Chili south of Arequipa. Quebrada San Lazaro and Quebrada Huarangual have formed fan-like deposits of material carried by the streams at the foot of the volcano. The quebradas (dry valleys) carry water during the wet season in November–December and March–April.

The permanent snowline lies above (Note: In 1990, the snowline was above 5800 m elevation. Mid-20th century sources discuss a snowline below its summit, and differences between the sides of the volcano and their causes, but temporary snow after precipitation can make the snowline appear lower than it actually is.) the summit. During December–August, snow can cover an area of 1–7 km^{2} on the upper cone and be mistaken for glaciers, but does not persist over time. Unlike neighbouring Chachani, Misti lacks any evidence of glacial or periglacial (Note: Although patterned ground and solifluction lobes were observed in the crater.) processes, probably due to its inner heat. Traces of glacial erosion like cirques, evidence of volcanic activity involving magma-water interaction and mudflows imply that Misti was glaciated during the first phase of the Last Glacial Maximum of the Central Andes 43,000 years ago. Ice cover might have been thin, however, and some sources question whether Misti was ever glaciated.

== Geology ==
=== Regional setting ===
Off Peru's west coast, the Nazca Plate subducts beneath South America at about 5–6 centimetres per year (2.0–2.4 in/year). The subduction is responsible for the volcanism of the CVZ. As the slab descends, it releases fluids that chemically modify the mantle above it, generating melt. Most Peruvian volcanoes have produced potassium-rich andesitic magmas, derived from the mantle and further modified by fractional crystallization (Note: The separation of crystals with particular composition from the melt) and the absorption of crustal rocks into the magma.

Volcanism in southern Peru dates back to the Jurassic, (Note: Between circa 201.3 and 145 million years ago.) but the modern volcanic arc system is much younger. The older arcs are the Tacaza Arc formed 30–15 million years ago, the Lower Barroso 9–4 million, the Upper Barroso 3–1 million and the Pleistocene-Holocene Frontal Arc during the past one million years. The Frontal Arc, which is the youngest, includes Misti and similarly aged volcanoes. The Tacaza Arc is the source of the Huaylillas Formation and the Barroso arc of the Sencca Formation. An older (Cretaceous–Paleogene) volcanic formation is the Toquepala Group. Two distinct episodes of uplift took place 24–13 and 9–4 million years ago, accompanied by the emplacement of large ignimbrites. (Note: Ignimbrites are volcanic deposits that consist of pumice embedded in ash and crystals, and which are deposited by pyroclastic flows.)

=== Local setting ===
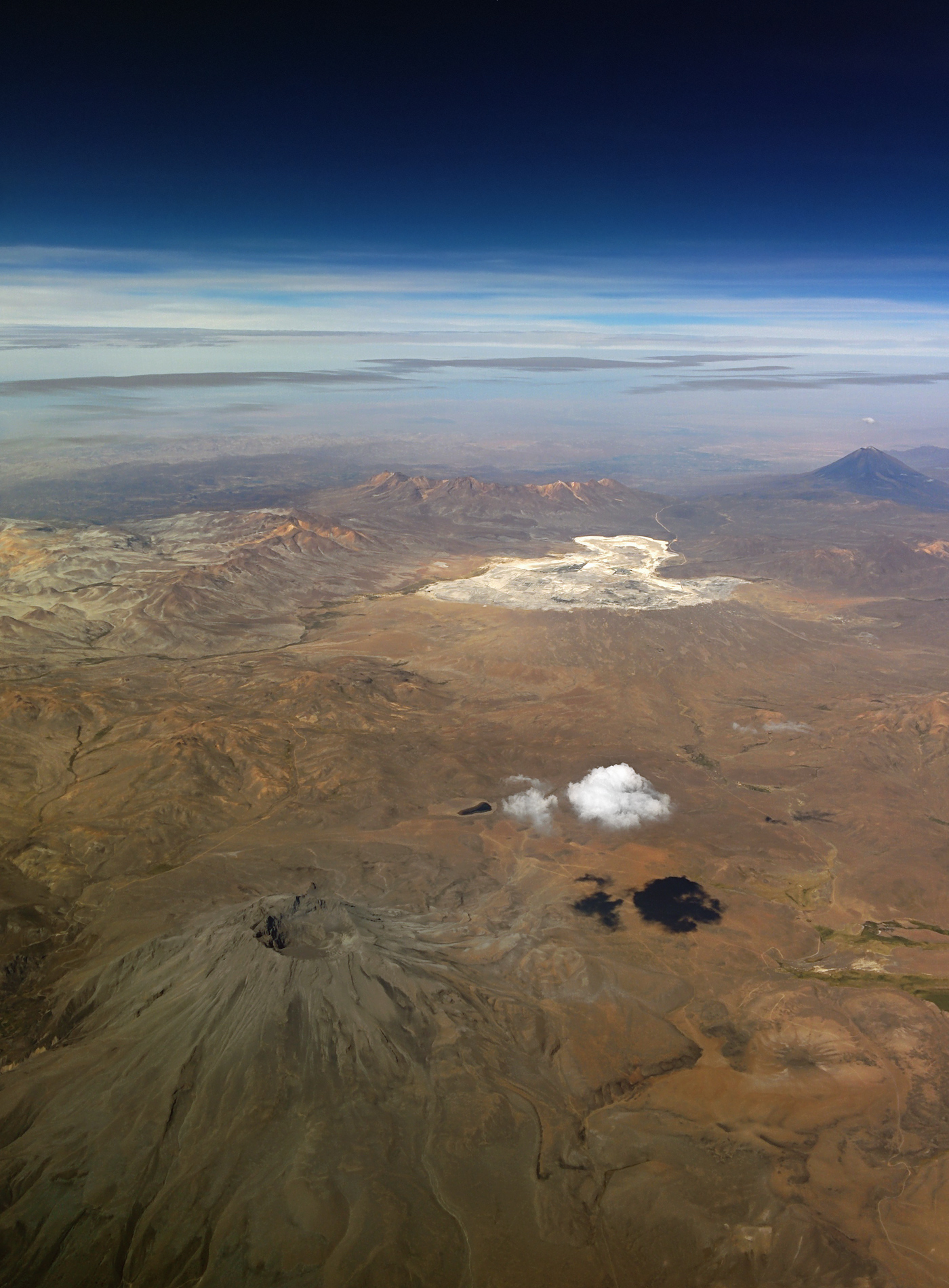
Aerial picture of Ubinas with Misti in the background (2015)

Misti is part of the Andean Western Cordillera. It is the youngest of a group of three Plio-Pleistocene volcanoes; the others are the dormant Chachani 15 km northwest and extinct Pichu Pichu 20 km southeast. The Yura volcanic group with Cerro Nicholson lies south of Chachani. The Chachani-Misti-Pichu Pichu group lies at the margin of the Altiplano, next to the 600 km^{2} tectonic depression of Arequipa where the city lies. The depression has dimensions of 30 km × 15 km and appears to be formed by fault activity. The terrain under Misti slopes south and this might make the mountain slip southward over time.

Most faults in the region run northwest–southeast, including the Huanca fault at Chachani and the Chili fault on Misti. Little is known of the history of their activity but some faults were active during the Holocene, offsetting tephra deposits, and may have provided a pathway for magma to ascend and form the volcanoes of Arequipa. The Incapuquio fault produced two earthquakes that coincide with Misti's last eruptions. Other north- and northeast-trending faults are inactive but could have influenced the formation of the Rio Chili canyon. The crust under the volcano is 55 km thick.

=== Basement ===
The basement under Misti is exposed in the Rio Chili gorge. It consists of Proterozoic rocks of the Arequipa Terrane, which are more than a billion years old, Triassic–Jurassic sediments of the Chocolate Formation, Socosani Formation and Yura Group, and the Cretaceous–Paleogene La Caldera batholith. The batholith forms the hills south of Arequipa. These formations are covered by rhyodacitic ignimbrites known as "sillars". They are between 13.8 and 2.4 million years old; the older ignimbrites are part of the Huaylillas Formation and the younger of the Barroso Arc. Individual ignimbrites are exposed in the Rio Chili gorge and include the 300 m thick Rio Chili ignimbrite from 13.19 ± 0.09 million years ago, the 4.89 ± 0.02 million-year-old La Joya ignimbrite or "sillar", the 1.65 ± 0.04 million-year-old Aeropuerto or Sencca ignimbrite, and the 1.02 million-year-old Yura Tuff and Capillune Formation. These ignimbrites were erupted from multiple calderas, (Note: A caldera is a bowl-shaped depression, formed by the collapse of a volcano.) one of which is now buried under Chachani. The ignimbrites are covered by volcanic sedimentary rocks and debris from the sector collapse of Pichu Pichu.

=== Composition ===
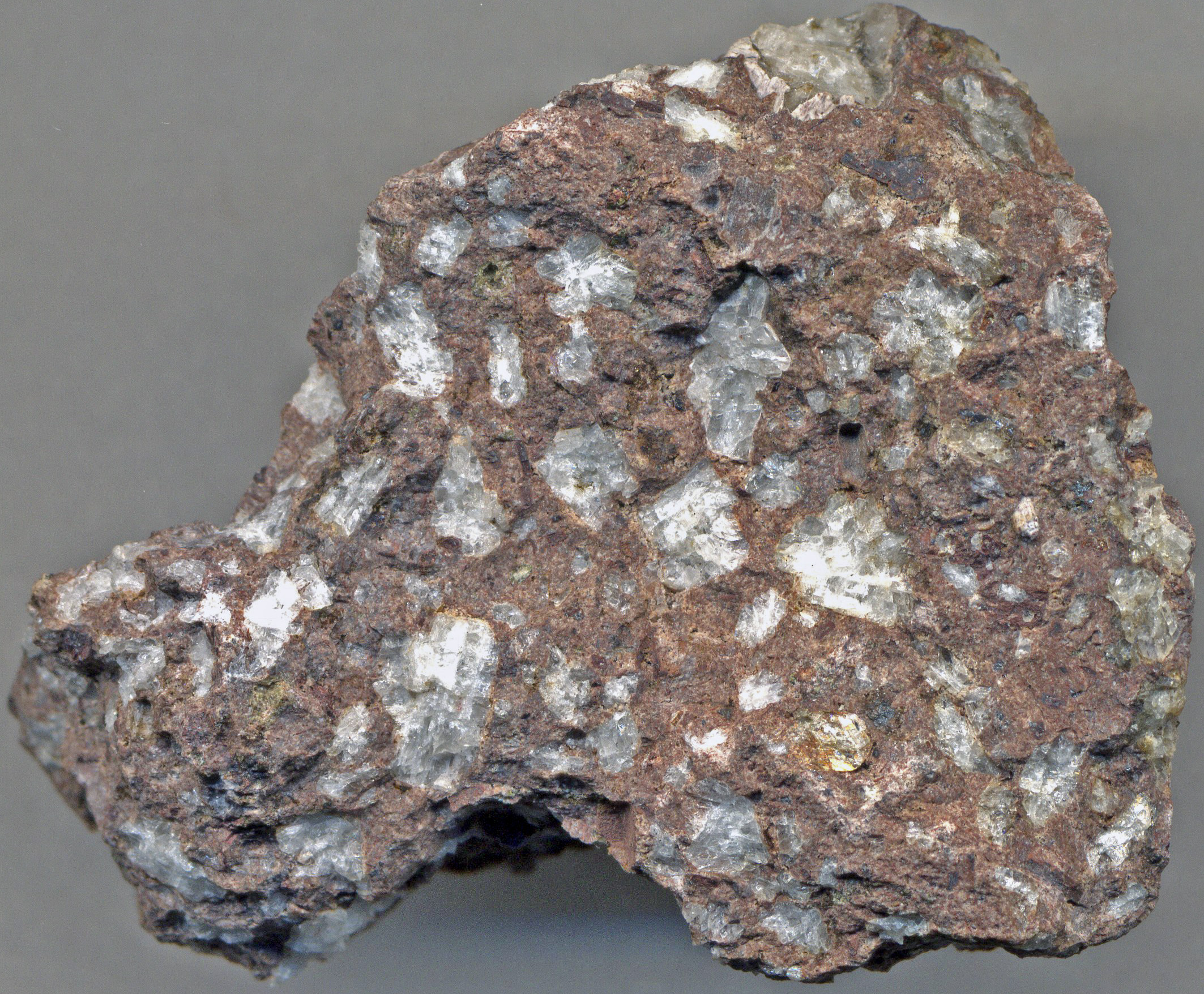
An example of andesitic rock with phenocrysts (the large white crystals) from Nevada, USA; Misti has produced similar rocks

Misti has erupted rocks mainly of andesitic composition, while dacitic and rhyolitic compositions are less common. (Note: Rhyolites and dacites are associated with explosive eruptions.) The volcanic rocks fall into several types: Pyroxene-amphibole andesites, amphibole andesites, amphibole dacites and amphibole rhyolites. There are reports that the volcano produced trachyandesite during the Holocene eruptions, and mica has also been reported. The rocks are chemically a potassium-rich calc-alkaline (Note: Calc-alkaline rocks are a family of volcanic rocks that are defined by a common trend in silicon dioxide and sodium-potassium-to-calcium content. They are the most important volcanic rocks in volcanic arc and orogeny volcanism.) rock type, typical for Peruvian volcanoes. Phenocrysts (Note: Volcanic rocks often consist of a mixture of crystals embedded in a non-crystalline solid material; these crystals are known as "phenocrysts".) are composed of amphibole, augite, biotite, enstatite, plagioclase and titanomagnetite. Magma composition has varied over time and the most recent volcanic stage has produced slightly different magmas, but overall the composition of Misti magmas is highly homogeneous. The composition of Misti magmas and those of its neighbours Pichu Pichu and Chachani resemble adakite, an unusual kind of volcanic rock whose occurrence at Misti is unexpected as the subducting plate is old. The Nazca fracture zone on the Nazca Plate projects under Misti and might be responsible for certain traits of its magmas. Some rocks erupted by the volcano show evidence of hydrothermal alteration, colouring them yellow.

Misti's magmas evolved through a combination of magma recharge, mixing with crustal material, and fractional crystallisation. Initially mantle-derived melts pool in a reservoir at the base of the crust, where they assimilate crustal material and undergo fractional crystallization. Afterwards they ascend to a shallower reservoir, where they interact with Proterozoic gneisses. Assimilation of basement rocks gave rise to the rhyolitic magmas erupted 34,000–31,000 years ago. Crystal-poor magma can form in the magma plumbing system through numerous processes and gives rise to the rhyolites and the volcanic plug. The existence of a third magma storage zone hosting mafic magmas at the base of the crust has been proposed.

It is not clear whether Misti has a single magma chamber or multiple magma reservoirs at depth, although the rock composition implies that only one large magma system is present. The reservoir appears to be 6–15 km underground and has a volume of several cubic kilometres. Every few millennia, a secondary rhyolitic reservoir forms at about 3 km depth; it was last reactivated during the eruption 2,000 years ago. The magma system is periodically recharged, but not every influx of new magma triggers eruptions; instead multiple recharges are necessary to cause activity. Numerous mixing and decompression events can happen to each magma batch before it is erupted, with mixing particularly important during the last 21,000 years. A recharge of the magma chamber may have occurred at some point before 2000 AD. The overall rate of magma supply is 0.63 km^{3}/ka, comparable to other stratovolcanoes in volcanic arcs, but with brief surges reaching about 2.1 km^{3}/ka and an increased rate during the last 21,000 years.

== Eruption history ==
Misti is a geologically young volcano that developed in four stages (commonly labelled Misti 1–4); a pre-Misti volcano may have formed the southwestern debris avalanche. Older volcanic structures lie mainly in the western sector of Misti. On average, sub-Plinian eruptions take place every 2,000–4,000 years, while ash fallout occurs every 500–1,500 years and large ignimbrite-producing eruptions every 10,000–20,000 years. Rock formations showing the stratigraphy of Misti are found mainly in the ravines on the southern side and the Rio Chili gorge; only a few eruptions have been thoroughly investigated. Seismic tomography has identified solidified buried magma bodies from the early stages of volcanism.

Long andesitic lava flows and ignimbrites, which reach a thickness of more than 400 m, form the oldest part of the volcano. They have an age of 833,000 years, but it is not clear whether the ignimbrites and lava flows should be considered part of "Misti 1" or of a pre-Misti volcano. Sometimes, they are considered the first stage of Misti activity, with all the subsequent activity making up the second stage. After the collapse that formed the south-southwestern debris avalanche deposit, the present stratovolcano began to grow 112,000 years ago. During the following 42,000 years, lava flows and lava domes built a mountain with an elevation of 4000–4500 m in the southern and eastern sectors of present-day Misti. During the subsequent 20,000 years, repeated collapses of lava domes deposited blocks, fallout deposits and scoria on the southern side of Misti and on Chachani to the northwest.

Between 50,000 and 40,000 years ago, the summit of Misti collapsed one or more times above 4400 m elevation, forming a 6 km x 5 km caldera. Intense pyroclastic eruptions yielded ignimbrites with volumes of 3–5 km^{3}, which cover an area of 100 km^{2} on the southern side of Misti. This activity brought "Misti 2" to an end; lava domes built "Misti 3" to an elevation of 5600 m, almost entirely erasing the caldera. Between 36,000 and 20,000 years ago, collapses of lava domes produced numerous block-and-ash flows of dacitic to andesitic composition, which reach thicknesses of several tens of metres on the southern side of Misti. The activity between 50,000 and 20,000 years ago has been christened "Cayma stage", and several eruption deposits from this time have been named:

- The 44,900–38,700 or 34,000–33,000-year-old "Fibroso I", also known as "Cogollo".
- The 43,200–38,300-year-old "Anchi".
- The 38,500–32,400-year-old "Sacarosa", "Sacaroso" or "Sacaroide". This eruption produced two layers of pumice from a 22 km high eruption column. The total volume of tephra is about 0.5–1.5 km^{3}, equivalent to a volcanic explosivity index of 4 or 5. It was a two-stage event, with a change of magma dynamics or intensity occurring during the eruption.
- The 37,100–30,500-year-old "Conchito" or "Fibroso II".
- The 30,300–28,800-year-old "Chuma". Several additional eruptions took place between the "Conchito" and "Chuma" events.
- The 15,000-years-old "Autopista". (Note: "Highway", referring to the appearance of the deposits in a stratigraphic section.) This eruption produced three layers composed mostly of pumice with smaller quantities of lithics. During its eruption about 0.16 km^{3} of volcanic ash fell west of the volcano. The "Autopista" eruption with a volcanic explosivity index of 4 produced about 0.6 km^{3} of tephra; a similar eruption today would cover parts of Arequipa with 10 cm of pumice. The "Autopista" deposit is the best preserved of the late Pleistocene tephra layers.
- Deposits of eruptions after "Autopista" have been named according to two schemes: One spans the Pleistocene and Holocene and lists "Blanco", "La Zebra", "Espuma gris", "Espuma iridiscente" and "Rosado", the other includes tephra layers up to the eruption 2,000 years ago and lists "Ponche Iridescente", "Ponche Gris", "Sandwich Inferior", "Sandwich Superior", "Sancayo", "La Rosada", "Apo" and "Misquirichi". Sometimes a "Duende" is identified between "Apo" and "Misquirichi". These naming schemes have been developed on deposits of the southwestern flank; other schemes have been formulated for deposits on the other flanks.

Eruptions 43,000 and 14,000 years ago dammed the Rio Socabaya and Rio Chili, forming temporary lakes south and north of the volcano that were later affected by earthquakes. Between 24,000 and 12,000 years ago, ice fields formed on Chachani and Misti during the last glacial maximum; tephra fell on ice and was reworked by meltwater. Several eruptions 34,000–31,000, 13,700 and 11,300 years ago produced pyroclastic surges that extended 12 km away from the volcano; a 2 km wide caldera formed at an elevation of 5400 m.

=== Holocene ===
More than 10 eruptions took place during the last 11,000 years, with only brief pauses in activity. The activity between 21,000 and 2,000 years ago is known as the "Pacheco" stage. Holocene activity filled the younger caldera with scoria and lava flows, forming the "Misti 4" volcanic structure with the nested summit craters. Tephra forms 5–6 m thick deposits around the volcano, and pyroclastic surges reached distances of many kilometres more than 6,400 and 5,200 years ago. The 9,000‑ and 8,500‑year‑old eruptions produced the "Sándwich" deposits. These deposits extend for more than 15 km on Misti's southwestern flank and produced ash fall as far as the Pacific Ocean and Lake Titicaca. Radiocarbon dating has identified eruptions 8,140, 6,390, 5,200, 4,750, 3,800 and 2,050 years ago; the 3,800 eruption deposited fallout on Nevado Mismi more than 90 km northwest of Misti. The Global Volcanism Program lists eruptions in 310 BCE ± 100 years, 2230 BCE ± 200 years, 3510 BCE ± 150 years, 4020 BCE ± 200 years, 5390 BCE ± 75 years and 7190 BCE ± 150 years.

==== Eruption 2,000 years ago and later activity ====
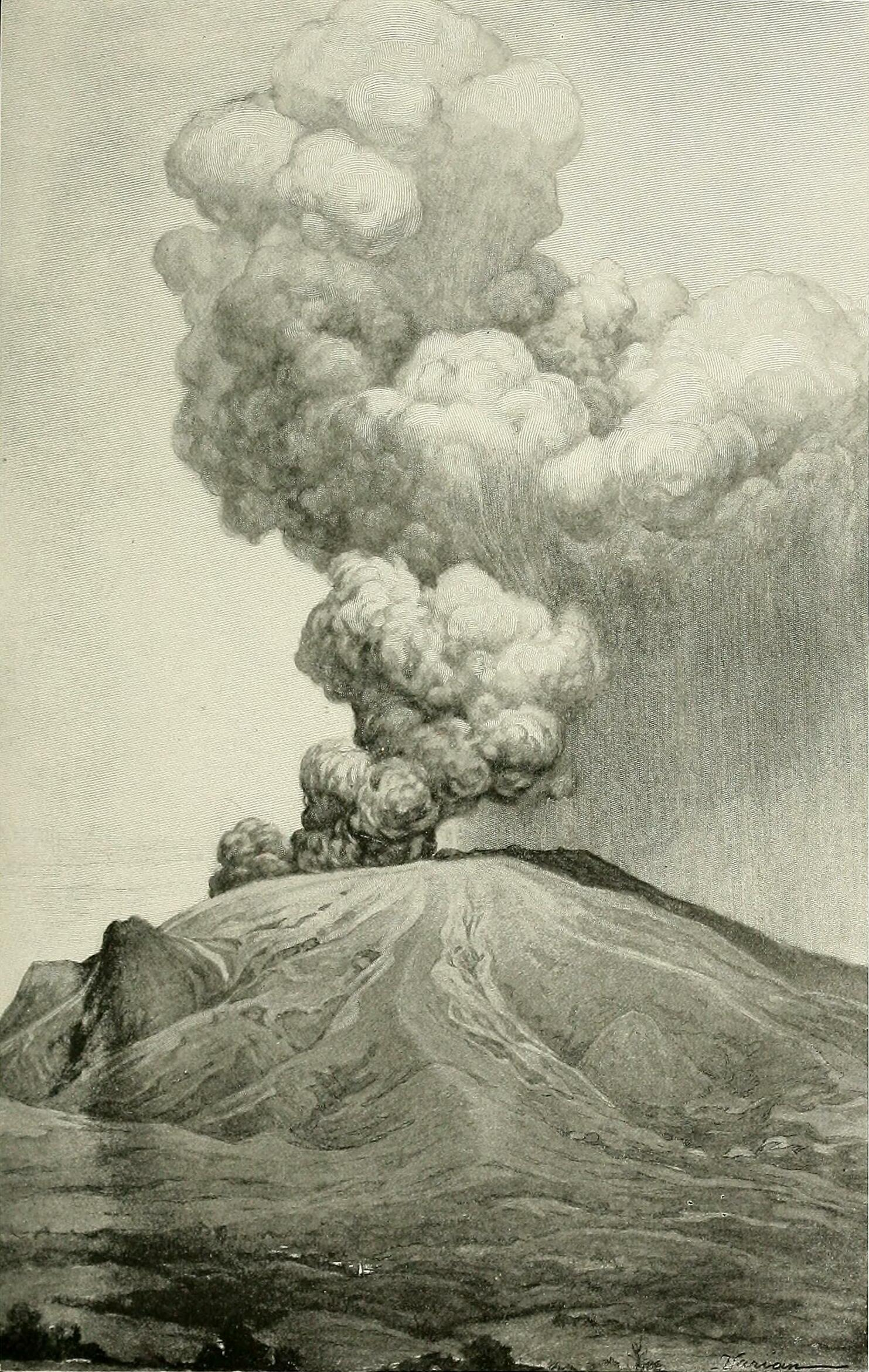
A drawing of the 1902 eruption of Mount Pelée, which resembled the Misti eruption 2,000 years ago in terms of size

The last major explosive eruption took place about 2,000 years ago in one or multiple events. The best-constrained date range is 2,060–1,920 years before present; some estimates around 2,300 BP are considered too old. It produced about 0.4 km^{3} of rock and probably lasted a few hours. The event had a volcanic explosivity index of 4 or 5.

The eruption was probably triggered when fresh andesitic magma entered a pre-existent rhyolitic body. Magma rose through the volcano and expelled rocks that were awash of the hydrothermal system, causing initial phreatic eruptions. (Note: A phreatic eruption is the emission of water steam and rocks, but without new magma.) Tephra rained down around the mountain, with pumice falling 25 km from the volcano. Owing to magma mixing, the pumice deposits have an appearance resembling chocolate and vanilla swirls. Eventually, the conduit fully cleared and a 29 km high eruption column rose above the volcano. Pyroclastic flows (Note: Flows consisting of hot volcanic debris.) emanated from the column and descended the southern flanks of the volcano, possibly through the gap in the crater rim. During the course of the eruption, collapses of the crater and conduit walls caused a temporary decline in the intensity of the column. The eruption column periodically collapsed and reformed, until the eruption ended with phreatomagmatic (Note: Phreatomagmatic activity is volcanic activity involving magma-water interactions.) explosions.

Mudflows descended the mountain, although their importance relative to the pyroclastic flows is contentious. The water source for the mudflows is unclear. The eruption occurred during the neoglacial (about 2,500–1,000 years ago), when Misti may have supported seasonal snow or ice; its melting would have given rise to mudflows. Rainfall generated further mudflows after the eruption. The outer summit crater probably formed during this eruption. Tephra layers in the Sallalli and (in this case with less certainty) Mucurca peat bogs close to Sabancaya, and (tentatively) in an ice core in the Antarctic Plateau in Antarctica, are attributed to this eruption. The 2,000 years eruption is the only Plinian eruption during the Holocene at Misti.

After the eruption 2,000 years ago, activity was limited to small Vulcanian eruptions, mudflows and tephra fallout, including scoria and volcanic ash. Dating has yielded ages of 330, 340, 520, 620, 1035 and 1,300 years before present for several such events. Pyroclastic flows and ash falls were emplaced 1,290 ± 100 and 620 ± 50 years ago. Mudflows—not all associated with eruptions—took place 1,035 ± 45, 520 ± 25, 340 ± 40 and 330 ± 60 years ago and left 5–15 m thick deposits.

==== Historical activity and seismicity ====
The last eruption took place in AD 1440–1470 (Note: The exact date is uncertain due to possible inaccuracies in the Inca chronologies.) and produced about 0.006 km^{3} of ash. It was probably a prolonged eruption that lasted for months or years, depositing ash in the Peruvian Laguna Salinas and possibly as far as Siple Dome and Law Dome in Antarctica. It is the oldest eruption of a South American volcano for which historical records exist. The eruption was severe enough that Mama Ana Huarque Coya, the wife of the Inca emperor Pachacutec, (Note: After who the deposit of the eruption was named.) came to Chiguata to provide assistance. There is no evidence that an Inca settlement was destroyed by this eruption, but the local population fled and the Inca had to resettle the area. Along with other volcanic eruptions around that time and the beginning Spörer solar minimum, the AD 1440–1470 eruption of Misti may have affected global climate conditions. In 1600, the volcano was covered by ash from Huaynaputina.

Most sources state that there is no clear evidence of eruptions after the arrival of the Spaniards, while the Global Volcanism Program reports a last eruption in 1985 and INGEMMET says it is the third-most active volcano of Peru. Mudflows descended the southern valleys until the 17th century. The mountain is sometimes reported to be "smoking" at its summit, including water vapour clouds. Phreatic eruptions may have taken place in 1577, 2 May 1677, 9 July 1784, 28 July 1787 and 10 October 1787. Questionable eruptions are recorded in 1542, 1599, 1826, 1830, 1831, 1869, and 1870. They probably constitute fumarolic activity and often happened after heavy precipitation; the water would have infiltrated the mountain and evaporated from the volcanic heat. There is no record of the structure of the summit craters changing in historical records, implying that the craters and volcanic plug were emplaced in prehistoric times. Comparisons between 1967 photos of the volcanic plug and more recent images show no changes.

The volcano is seismically active, with long-period earthquakes, tremors, "tornillos" (Note: Tornillos are a type of earthquake with long period and long coda; their waveforms have shapes resembling screws, which in Spanish translates to "tornillo".) and volcano tectonic earthquakes recorded. The hypocentres, the actual sites of the earthquakes, are found within the volcanic structure of Misti and cluster on the northwest flank of the volcano. The seismic activity appears to be linked to Misti's hydrothermal system. Seismic swarms were recorded in August 2012 and in May and June 2014. No deformation of the volcano is evident in satellite images. Clouds rising from the mountain are sometimes mistaken for renewed activity.

== Hazards ==
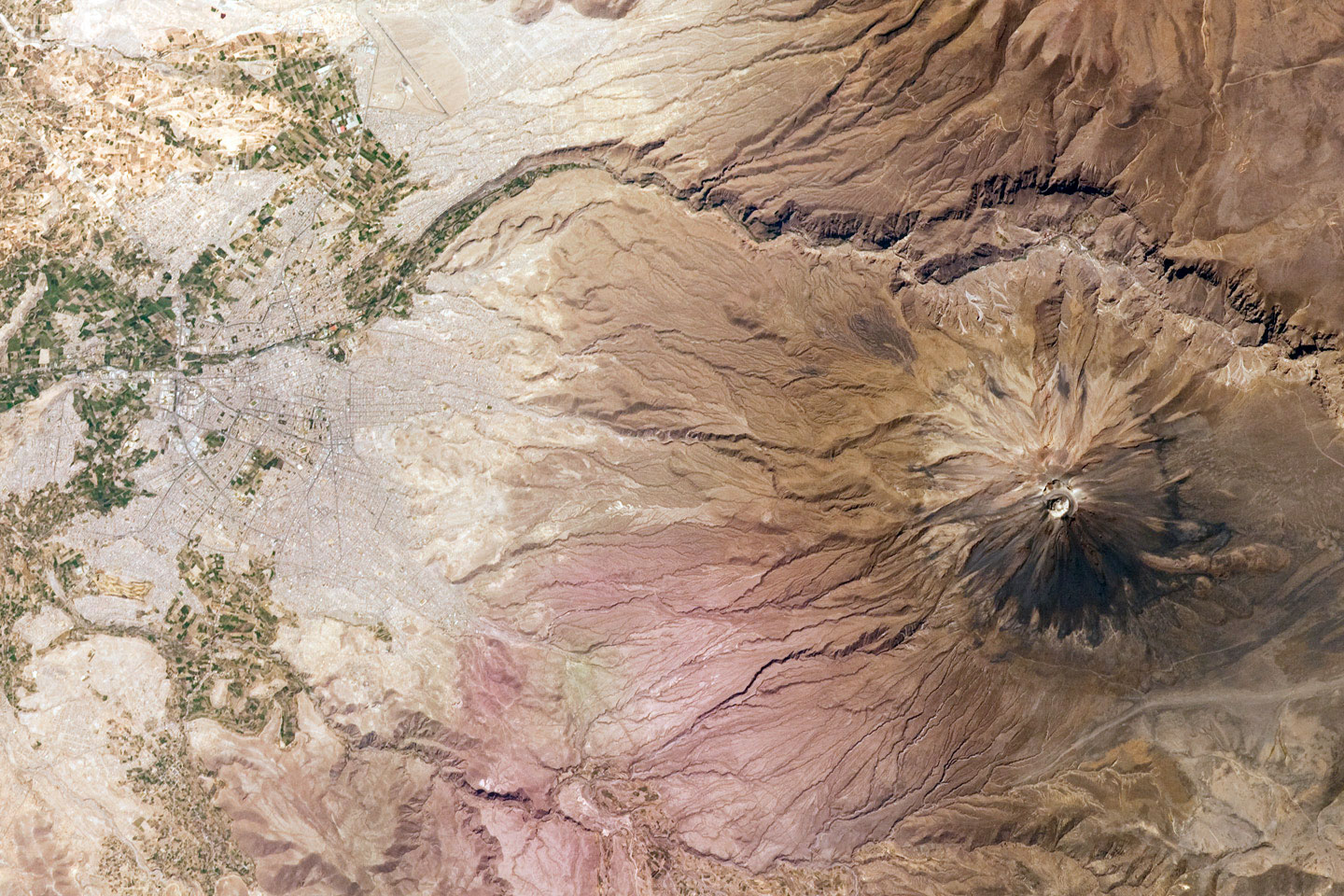
This mosaic of two astronaut photographs illustrates the proximity of Arequipa to Misti (2009).

Misti is Peru's most dangerous volcano and one of the most dangerous in the world, owing to its location just 12 km (7.5 mi) from Arequipa, a city of over one million residents. Over time the city has expanded and new towns, neighbouring towns and districts (Note: Alto Selva Alegre, Chiguata, Mariano Melgar, Miraflores and Paucarpata.) get within 8 km of the crater. About 8.6% of Peru's gross domestic product depends on Arequipa, making the potential economic impact of an eruption substantial. The city is constructed on mudflow and pyroclastic flow deposits of the volcano and all the valleys that drain Misti pass directly or indirectly through Arequipa. At least 220,000 people south of Misti are threatened by floods, mudflows and pyroclastic flows channelled through the ravines.

Individual threats from Misti include:

- The eruptions 2,000 years ago and in 1440–1470 AD deposited tephra over what is now Arequipa. Tephra fallout (Note: The rarity of tephra deposits within Arequipa is probably due to erosion and the dense urban environment and does not reflect an absence of tephra falls.) can cause health problems, pollute water resources, cause roofs to collapse, bury fields, and cause road accidents and accidents during cleanup. Much closer to the volcano, large rocks can fall.
- Mudflows are mixtures of rocks and water. They are caused by rainfall or the melting of snow and ice and can happen without volcanic activity. At Misti, they occur on average every century or two. Small mudflows can reach the city and bury and destroy everything in their path. Eruptions of Misti could generate mudflows on Chachani, thus threatening settlements that are on the other side of the Rio Chili.
- Pyroclastic flows are hot 300–800 °C (600–1,000 °F) masses of gas and rocks that can descend the slopes at speeds of 200–400 kilometres per hour (60–100 m/s); they can flow over topographic obstacles and reach large distances from the volcanic vent. Pyroclastic flows and surges can extend 13 km (8.1 mi) from the volcano, although denser flows are likely to stop before reaching the city.
- The steep slopes put Misti at risk of sector collapses. Debris avalanches from the collapse of volcanoes can reach large distances, larger than that between Arequipa and Misti. Debris flows, like mudflows, can destroy everything in their path. Such collapses could also dam the Rio Chili, producing mudflows and threatening neighbourhoods like Vallecito, Av. La Marina and Club Internacional. Small landslides on the western side of the volcano could threaten the water supply of Arequipa.
- Toxic gases can accumulate in closed spaces to dangerous concentrations, or interact with precipitation to form acid rain. Lava flows are highly destructive, but their slow speed does not constitute a major threat to life.

Not all hazards associated with Misti involve eruptions; seasonal flooding can also occur in channels draining the volcano during the wet season. Heavy metals, presumably from Misti and Chachani, have been found in river water.

== Monitoring and hazard management ==
In 2001, there was neither emergency planning nor land-use planning around Misti; the 2002–2015 development plan mentioned volcanic hazards but did not envisage specific measures. The last eruption of Misti had taken place shortly before the foundation of Arequipa, and thus—unlike for earthquakes—there is no memory of the hazards of volcanic activity. Before the eruption of Ubinas in 2006–2007, volcanic hazards drew little attention from the Peruvian state and there was little awareness in Arequipa. The volcano is frequently considered a protective figure and not as a threat. A number of people associate volcanoes with lava flows and neglect other volcanic hazards.

Beginning in 2005, INGEMMET began monitoring volcanoes in Peru; the first monitoring equipment was at the Charcani V hot spring. Later the monitoring was extended to other hot springs, and the crater fumaroles were monitored both from Arequipa and from within the crater. Monitoring of seismic activity commenced in 2005. Beginning in 2008, geodesic measurement stations were installed on the northeastern and southern slopes of the volcano, and a new monitoring station for the volcano was inaugurated in 2012. In May 2009 and April 2010, two exercise evacuations of several suburbs of Arequipa were carried out. The Peruvian Volcano Observatory (OVI) was inaugurated in Arequipa in 2013; it monitors Misti, Ubinas, Ticsani and other Peruvian volcanoes. By 2021, the monitoring network on Misti included seismometers, equipment that measures the composition and temperature of hot springs and fumaroles, and sensors for movements or deformations of the mountain. These efforts have yielded an increased awareness of the dangers posed by Misti, which is now being increasingly perceived as an active volcano. Efforts have been made to slow the growth of the northern suburbs of Arequipa, which are closest to Misti.

A volcano hazard map, developed in 2005 by local and international organisations, and presented in early 2008, divides the area into three zones (high, intermediate, and low hazard) based on threats such as debris flows, mudflows, pyroclastic flows, and tephra fallout. The "high risk" zone encompasses the entire volcanic cone, its immediate surroundings and the valleys that emanate from it. Parts of Arequipa lie in the "high risk" zone. The "intermediate risk" zone surrounds the "high risk" zone, including the lower slopes of neighbouring mountains and most of the northeastern parts of Arequipa. The "low risk" zone in turn surrounds the "intermediate risk" zone and includes the rest of the city. Additional maps show areas at risk of tephra fallout, lava flows, mudflows, pyroclastic flows and scoria flows. The hazard map of Misti is the first hazard map of a Peruvian volcano. These maps serve to mitigate volcano hazards and to inform local development. A 3D map was published in 2018. In 2010, the municipality of Arequipa decreed that the hazard map would have to be considered in future city zoning decisions.

=== Scenarios ===
Three different scenarios of future eruptions have been evaluated. The first envisages a small eruption, similar to recent activity at Sabancaya, or the 1440–1470 AD eruption of Misti. Ash fall would occur around the volcano, reaching 5 cm in the urban area and shutting down the airport of Arequipa. Landslides could damage the dams on the Rio Chili while mudflows descend the southern slopes. The second scenario involves an eruption like the eruption 2,000 years ago. Thicker ash falls (exceeding 10 cm) could cause building collapse and pyroclastic flows down the steep slopes south of Misti, reaching the suburbs of Arequipa and Chiguata. Most risk assessments are based on these two scenarios.

The third scenario is a Plinian eruption like the "Fibroso" and "Sacaroso" events or the 1600 Huaynaputina eruption; pyroclastic flows would sweep all the flanks of Misti and past Arequipa, blocking the Rio Chili. Thick ash fall would occur over the entire region, including over the cities of El Alto, La Joya and agricultural areas. A Plinian eruption would require the evacuation of Arequipa. Other hazard scenarios are the emissions of short lava flows, the formation and collapse of lava domes and the collapse of part of the mountain.

== Fumarolic and geothermal system ==
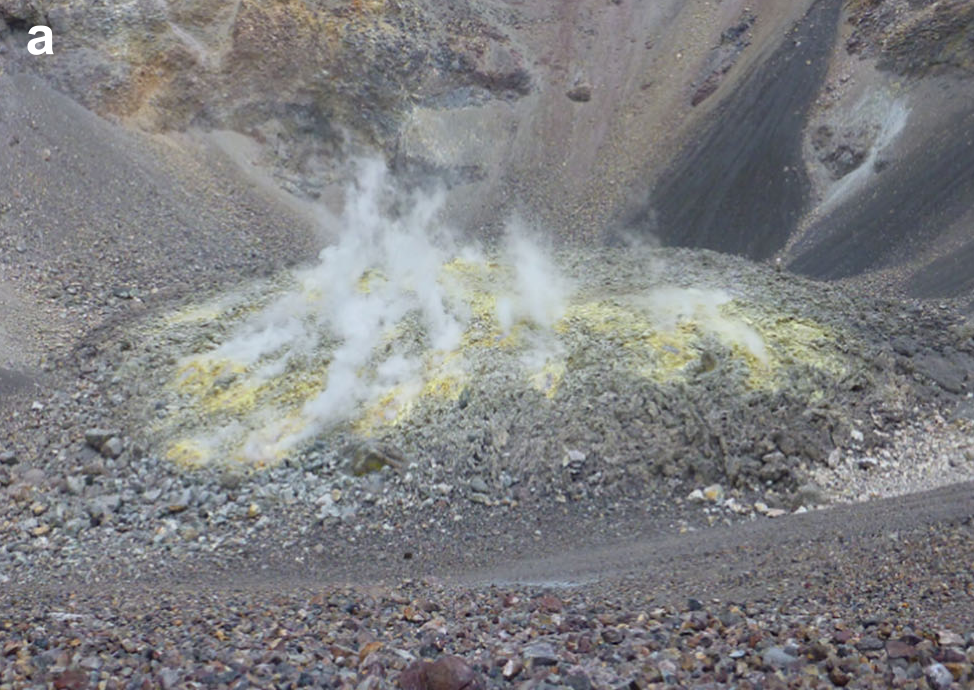
The fumaroles on the lava dome of Misti

Fumaroles exist in several places: the volcanic plug; the northern and northeastern walls of the volcano's inner crater; and the southeastern flank of the volcano. They can be noisy, produce visible water‑vapour plumes, and smell of rotten eggs due to hydrogen sulfide. The smell reaches the crater rim, at times gas concentrations can become high enough to irritate the eyes, nose, and throat. Fumarolic activity has been reported since the 1440–1470 eruption. In 1948–1949 and 1984–1985, it was intense enough that it could be seen from Arequipa. The fumarolic activity is visible in satellite images as a temperature anomaly of about 6 K (11 °F).

Water is the most important component of the fumarole gases, followed by carbon dioxide, sulfur dioxide, hydrogen sulfide and hydrogen. The hydrogen chloride and hydrogen sulfide content makes them highly acidic. Fumarole temperatures have varied through the years: generally they are between 125–310 °C with peaks of 430 °C. In the 21st century, fumarole gases appear to derive directly from magma, with no interaction with a hydrothermal system. Fumaroles outside the summit crater are cooler, with temperatures of 50–80 °C, and lack the strong sulphurous odour reported at the summit.

Fumarolic vents are surrounded by concentric deposits of anhydrite close to the vent, gypsum at some distance and sulfur in the colder vents. Other minerals are ammonium sulfate, hematite, ralstonite, soda alum and sodium chloride. Elemental compositions and isotope ratios indicate that the fumarole deposits are derived from the leaching of volcanic rocks and the water from precipitation. The chemistry of the deposits changed between 1967 and 2018; the zinc and lead concentrations decreased and increased, respectively. The fumarolic system also warmed during this period, which may have been due to the arrival of new magma in the volcano. Sometimes the temperature of the fumaroles is high enough to melt the sulfur, and the fumarolic gases can ignite.

Hot springs occur around the volcano, including Humaluso (Umaluso) to the north and several groups to the south and southwest. The south–southwestern group includes Agua Salada, Bedoya (La Bedoya), Calle Cuzco, Charcani V, Chilina Norte, Chilina Sur, Jésus, Ojo de Milagro, Puente de Fierro, Sabandia, Tingo, Yumina, and Zemanat. The hottest of these is the Charcani V spring in the Rio Chili gorge; it is also the closest to the volcano, being only 6 km from the crater. The Jésus and Umaluso springs produce gas bubbles. The springs are fed by a low-temperature geothermal system that mostly produces alkaline waters containing bicarbonate, chloride and sulfate. Their waters appear to originate through the mixing of freshwater, magmatic water and chloride-rich deep water. Many of these springs feature artificial pools or have water intakes, and several are monitored by INGEMMET for changes in activity.

High soil temperatures on the cone, hot springs and fumaroles indicate that Misti contains a hydrothermal system. Electric potential measurements indicate that the system appears to be confined between faults or to the older caldera. The activity has not been stable over time; after the 2001 southern Peru earthquake, flow at the Charcani V spring and the temperature of the crater emissions increased noticeably. Water temperatures decreased after the 2007 Peru earthquake. Over time old fumarolic vents shut down and new vents develop, but the configuration of the dome vents is stable over time. The fumarolic activity is correlated to earth tides, the deformation of the Earth caused by the Moon's and Sun's gravity.

== Climate and vegetation ==
The region has a semi-arid climate with mild temperatures. In Arequipa, temperatures are stable throughout the year, with minima of 6.9–11.2 °C and maxima of 23.2–22.1 °C. Temperatures decrease with elevation. In 1910, monthly mean temperatures at the summit ranged from −6 °C in January to −9.7 °C in May, June and August. In 1968, summit temperatures rose above freezing for a few days each year.

The summit is often covered in clouds. For most of the year, dry westerly winds blow over the Western Cordillera; during summer, convection over the Amazon forces easterly flow that draws moisture to the Cordillera. Wind speeds at the summit are on average 5 m/s, with gusts to 16 m/s. Most precipitation falls during the austral summer (December to March); according to a 1974 publication, it reached 90 millimetres per year (3.5 in/year) and a 1910 study found most precipitation to be in the form of snow or hail. During the wet season, rainstorms and flash floods erode the volcanic debris deposits. During the dry season, any snow cover tends to disappear quickly. The El Niño–Southern Oscillation and sea surface temperatures in the Atlantic and Pacific Oceans govern annual rainfall. After a wet and cold start to the Holocene, the climate in the Western Cordillera may have been moist until 5,200–5,000 years ago. A subsequent dry period lasted until the 16th century AD, when the Little Ice Age began.

The region west of the Andes, including the terrain at the foot of Misti, is mostly desert with cacti and dwarf shrubs as the principal vegetation forms. This vegetation belt is sometimes called the "Misti zone". Plant communities change with elevation: vegetation is dominated by ragweed bushes between 2200–2900 m and by the bush Diplostephium tacorense above 3000 m. Other bushes occur mainly in creeks and valleys. At higher elevations, other genera such as Adesmia and Senecio idiopappus become more frequent, and at an elevation of about 3900 m Lepidophyllum quadrangulare becomes the dominant plant. Cacti, herbs, yareta cushion plants, ichu (Jarava ichu), as well as pioneer species like lichens and mosses, are important above 3500 m. Polylepis species form woodlands. Vegetation cover decreases above 4000 m elevation.

Most of the volcano is within the Salinas y Aguada Blanca National Reserve, which extends northwest of Misti and includes the volcano among its main attractions. 358 plant, 37 mammal and 158 bird species have been recorded in the reserve, including alpacas, guanacos, llamas and vicuñas among the mammals and the Andean condor among the birds. Several species, such as the Bolivian grass mouse, the stonecrop Sedum ignescens, and Cantua volcanica, were first discovered at Misti; the name volcanica is a reference to Misti.

== Religious importance ==
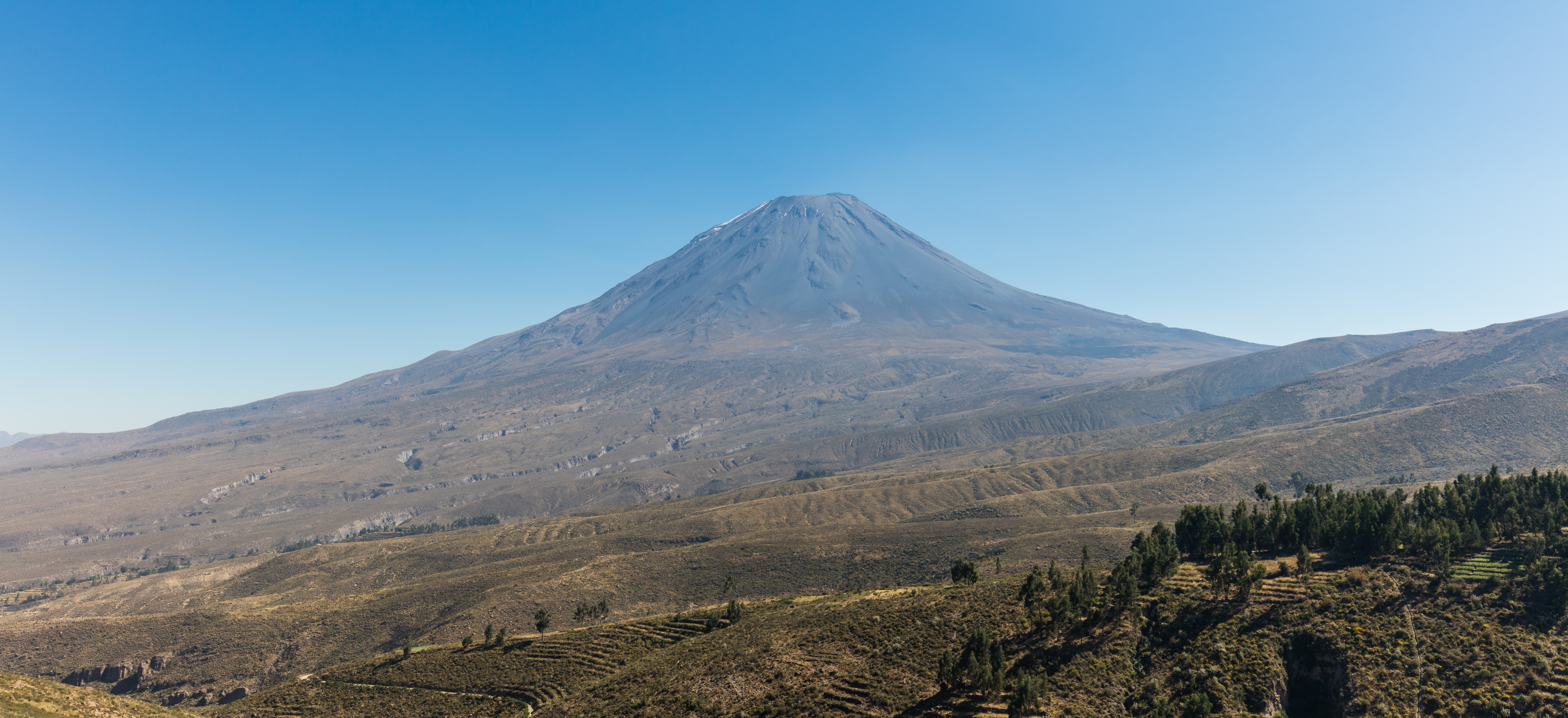
Misti, as seen from Arequipa (2015)

People in Arequipa venerated Misti as an apu (Note: A form of deity. Another way Misti was referred to was as "volcano of the city".), reflecting a wider tradition of mountain worship in the Andes. According to the late 16th-century chronicler Cristóbal de Albornoz, Misti was one of the important mountains (waqa, a kind of deity or idol) of the Inca Empire's Arequipa area, along with Ampato, Coropuna, Sara Sara and Solimana. These traditions may have originated among earlier inhabitants of the area and were later adopted by the Inca after they conquered the region. The Aymara people viewed Misti as an abode of deceased souls, with traditions varying by region: some described it as a benign destination for souls, others as a more fearful one. The Middle Horizon Millo archaeological site in the Rio Vitor valley was constructed in a manner that allowed a good view of Misti, which was probably the apu of the valley. Petroglyphs at Toro Muerto may depict Misti and Chachani in an astronomical context.

The Inca made offerings of cups of gold and silver to the apus and settled people around Misti, people who would continue the mountain veneration. Some communities practised cranial deformation in infants, shaping skulls to resemble the volcano. Some accounts characterised Misti as an aggressive mountain that was always demanding sacrifices, and in colonial times, one pilgrimage was held, aiming at exorcising the volcano. After the Spanish conquest, the mountain was consecrated to St. Francis. According to the Jesuit College of Arequipa, "Indian sorcerers" thought that Huaynaputina volcano had asked Misti for assistance in expelling the Spaniards; Misti, the story says, refused, claiming it was already Christianised, so Huaynaputina had proceeded alone. During episodes of increased activity, the inhabitants of Arequipa carried out religious ceremonies, including public penance and flagellations, to appease the volcano. A group of converts and Franciscans in 1600 climbed Misti and threw saints' relics and a cross into its crater to calm the volcano. Another expedition was launched in 1784, after an earthquake had destroyed Arequipa, and planted a cross on the summit. This cross was replaced twice: first a decade later and then in 1900 as a celebration of the new century. The cross on the summit of Misti supposedly protects the city. Religious ceremonies continue to be carried out on the volcano. Some geologists reportedly make offerings to the volcano before beginning fieldwork. Local farmers believe that offerings to Misti lead to the birth of boys, while offerings to Chachani lead to the birth of girls.

== Mummies ==
Eight or nine mummies were found on Misti by the North American anthropologist Johan Reinhard and the Arequipan archaeologist José Antonio Chávez in 1998, inside the crater and below the summit. The mummies were children, mostly boys around six years old. In some cases, the bodies were buried one on top of another. Unusually, the mummies were buried in shared tombs. Along with the mummies were figurines, ceramics and other objects; the high number of figurines found on Misti (47) indicates that the site was important to the Incas. These mummies were Inca human sacrifices, called capacochas, and the number of mummies at Misti forms the largest known capacocha assemblage. However, the hostile conditions within the crater had seriously damaged the mummies.

The sacrifices on Misti, and others on Chachani and Pichu Pichu, were probably motivated by the 1440–1470 eruption of Misti, which may explain the unusual location within the crater rather than on a summit. According to the 16th-century chronicler Martín de Murúa, the Inca emperor Thupa Yapanki sacrificed llamas to calm a volcano named Putina close to Arequipa (probably Misti), going as closely as possible to the summit. Some stories say that previous ceremonies had failed to calm the volcano and only the emperor's direct intervention quelled its anger. This description most likely refers to the 1600 eruption of Huaynaputina, rather than eruptions at Misti.

== Climbing and recreation ==
Misti was first ascended by pre-Columbian people, who left archaeological evidence around the summit. The first documented ascent was by Álvaro Meléndez, a priest from Chiguata, on 1 May 1667. Numerous ascents of the volcano were made already during the 18th and 19th centuries. On 9 July 1988, U.S. cyclist Terry Powers reached Misti's summit with a mountain bike and rode down the northern slopes. According to mountaineer John Biggar, most climbers approach from the Aguada Blanca dam (a permit is required to cross it), with campsites around 4600 m. From there, the summit can be reached in a long day. Alternative routes start on the southern flank at Apurimac San Luis (via Tres Cruces and Los Pastores) or from Chiguata, the latter of which typically takes several days. Ascent from Chiguata takes a few days. Climbers report difficulties due to the loose ground, noxious gases and altitude sickness. Biggar cautioned that there is no source of potable water on the mountain.

The volcano is frequently visited by tourists, who come for the sight of the landscape surrounding Misti. Tourist activities at Misti include mountaineering, trekking and running down scree slopes. Ascents take place almost year-round. Misti and its neighbouring volcanoes have been investigated as potential geosites (Note: Geosites are sites of geological interest.).

== See also ==
- List of volcanoes in Peru
