= Cerro Nicholson =

Highest point
- Elevation: 2,525 m (8,284 ft)
- Coordinates: 16.261°S 71.754°W

Cerro Nicholson is a scoria cone in Peru. It is constructed on top of the 1.65 mya Arequipa Airport Ignimbrite and is well preserved with a summit crater. It is located west-southwest of Chachani volcano and was emplaced 77,400 ± 18,400 years ago.

It is part of the so-called "Yura Monogenetic Field", which was only discovered in 2022. Lavas erupted from this centre are dark in colour. They are basalt andesitic with vesicularity between 0 and 70%.

== See also ==
- Andagua volcanic field
- El Misti
