= Chachani =

Volcano in Peru

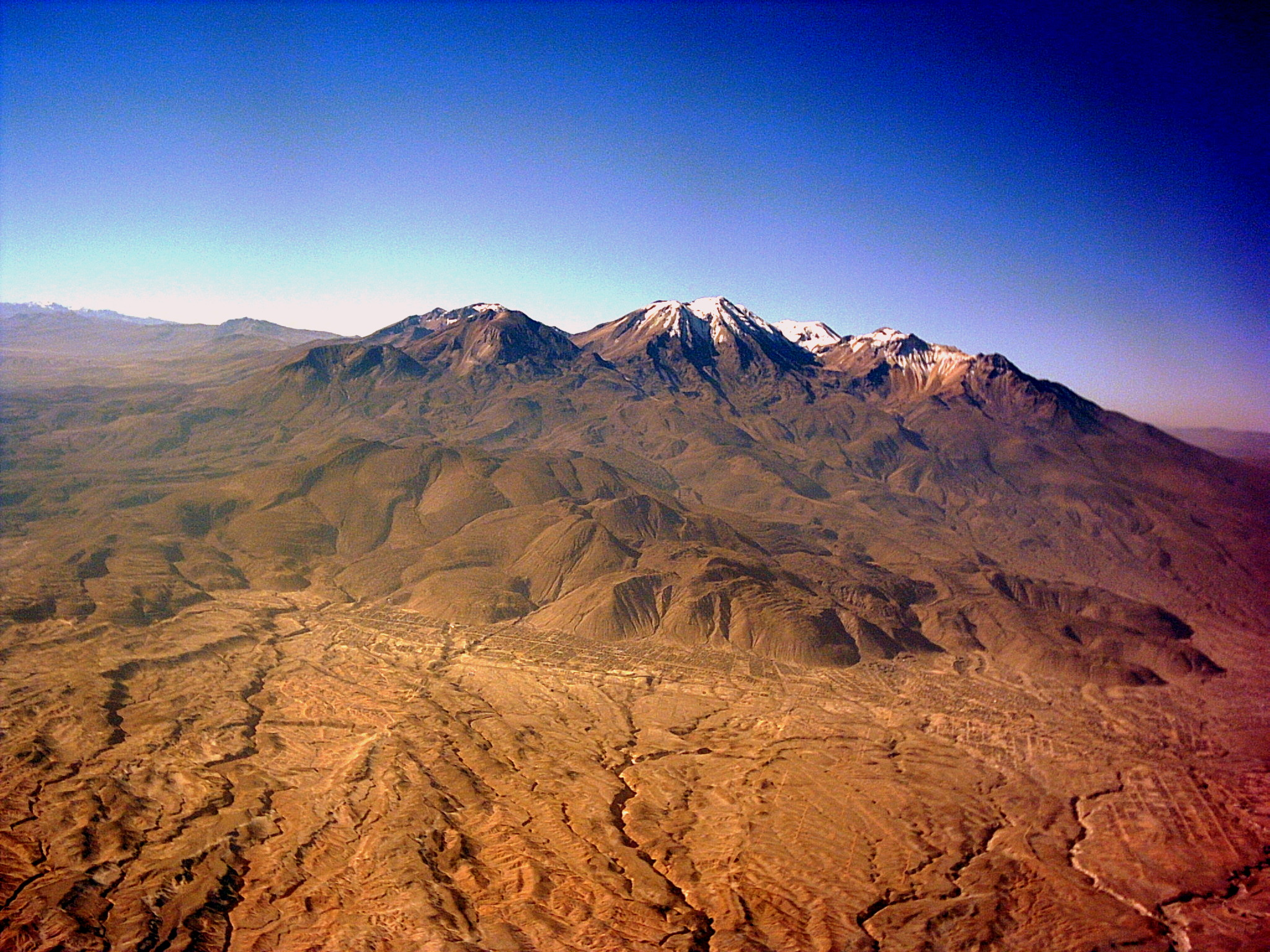
- Chachani viewed from the south

Highest point
- Elevation: 6,057 m (19,872 ft)
- Prominence: 1,976 m (6,483 ft)
- Parent peak: Huascaran
- Coordinates: 16°11′S 71°31′W

Geography
- Location within Peru

Geology
- Mountain type: Volcanic complex
- Last eruption: Unknown

Chachani is a volcanic group in southern Peru, 22 kilometres (14 mi) northwest of the city of Arequipa. Part of the Central Volcanic Zone of the Andes, it is 6,057 metres (19,872 ft) above sea level. It consists of several lava domes and individual volcanoes such as Nocarane, along with lava shields such as the Airport Domes. Underneath Chachani lies a caldera.

During the Pliocene and early Pleistocene, the volcanic group produced large ignimbrites such as the La Joya, Arequipa Airport, and Yura Tuff ignimbrites; afterwards, the volcanic group proper grew in the caldera until about 56,500 years ago. There have been no eruptions during historical times. Still, the volcano is considered to be only dormant, and due to its closeness to the city of Arequipa, it is considered high-risk.

== Name ==
The name means "brave" in Aymara or "mountain of man"/"mountain of male"; the alternative spellings "Cacheni" and "Charchani" are also known.

== Geography and geomorphology ==
The volcano lies in the Andes of southern Peru, 22 kilometres (14 mi) northwest of Arequipa and north of the Arequipa Airport; the city of Arequipa is situated on the foot of Chachani and El Misti volcanoes. The road from Arequipa to Chivay runs along the southeastern foot of Chachani, and a dirt road reaches to an elevation of 5,000 metres (16,000 ft). It is considered to be one of the most easily climbed mountains in the 6,000–7,000 m range, although acclimatization and good physical health are required to ascend it. In the late 19th century, the good sight from Chachani was remarked upon, and there are more recent efforts to define geosites around the volcano. Politically, it lies in the Cayma, Yura, and Cerro Colorado districts.

Volcanoes in the southern part of Peru include from north to south Auquihuato, Firura, Coropuna, Andagua volcanic field, Sabancaya, Ampato, Chachani, El Misti, Pichu Pichu, Ubinas which has erupted intermittently since 1954, Huaynaputina where a large eruption occurred in 1600, Ticsani, Tutupaca, Yucamane, and Casiri. Some of these volcanoes are among the highest in the world, and on average, there is one eruption of a Peruvian volcano every 13 years. The Peruvian volcanoes are part of the Central Volcanic Zone of the Andes, one of three separate volcanic belts in that mountain chain; the Central Volcanic Zone contains 44 named stratovolcanoes.

Chachani is an about 2-kilometre-high (1.2 mi) (Note: Other data from digital elevation models: SRTM yields 6,056 metres (19,869 ft), ASTER 6,043 metres (19,826 ft) and TanDEM-X 6,012 metres (19,724 ft).) (Note: The height of the nearest key col is 4,094 metres (13,432 ft), leading to a topographic prominence of 1,976 metres (6,483 ft) with a topographical dominance of 32.55%. Its parent peak is Huascaran Sur and the Topographic isolation is 1,022.9 kilometres (635.6 mi).) and 17-kilometre-wide (11 mi) complex (Note: Different studies have come to different numbers of individual volcanoes making up the Chachani complex.) of lava domes, stratovolcanoes, and volcanic cones; the highest summit is 6,057 metres (19,872 ft) high, making Chachani the 84th-highest peak in the Andes. The Chachani complex has an arcuate shape encompassing both the main Chachani volcano and the 5,784-metre-high (18,976 ft) Nocarane (Note: Also known as Nocarani, Noccarani and Nocorane.) to the north of Chachani, while the 5,484-metre-high (17,992 ft) La Horqueta together with El Rodado to its west and Chachani proper to its east forms an east–west-trending ridge. La Horqueta has a young appearance and resembles an ash cone with a crater. Additional peaks are the northerly 5,852-metre-high (19,199 ft) high los Ángeles and the southeasterly 5,820-metre-high (19,090 ft) Trigo. In total, Chachani is made up of more than 12 edifices. Many of them sport yellow-orange colours and various shapes, owing to erosion and hydrothermal alteration.

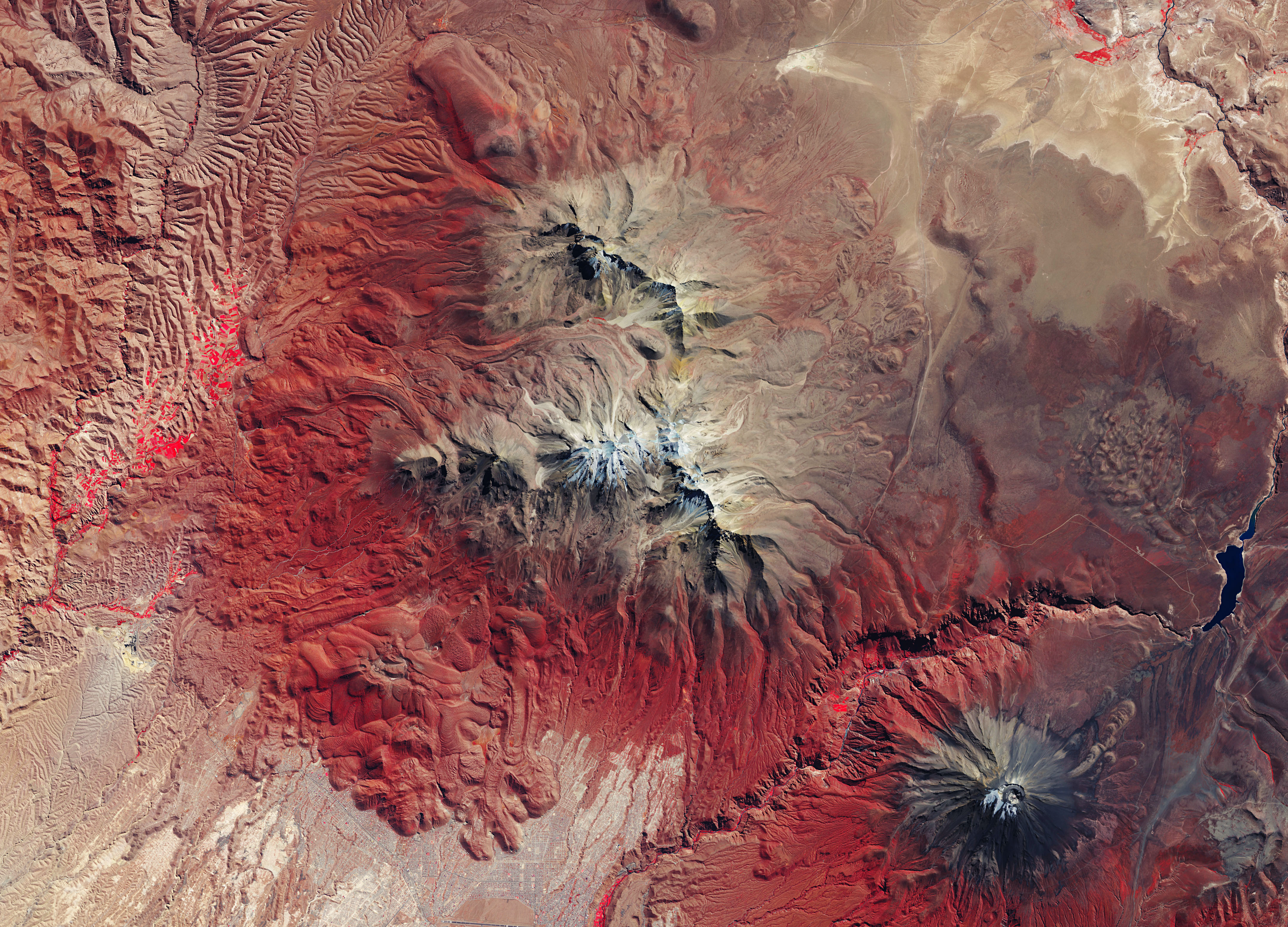
Chachani volcanic complex in Peru. Standing at over 6000 m, Chachani is the tallest of the mountains near the Peruvian city of Arequipa. 2017 false-color satellite image.

The Colorado lava domes which are also known as Cerro Penones in turn are located northwest from Nocarane. To the south of Chachani lie the Airport Domes, (Note: Also known as Las Cortaderas or Los Angeles-Pampa de Palacio.) an 8-kilometre-wide (5.0 mi) lava shield with two discernible vents and a pristine appearance. The lava shield consists of overlapping lava flows with a wavy and rugose texture and a steep front which reaches heights of 1.2 kilometres (0.75 mi); evidently these were formed by viscous lava flows. A volcanic caldera associated with widespread ignimbrites in the Arequipa area may be located underneath Chachani; to the north its outline is marked by a 20-kilometre-wide (12 mi) amphitheatre while its southern part is continuous with the Arequipa depression and is generally poorly recognizable. The El Misti volcano later arose on the margin of the Chachani caldera, where it intersects the border of the Altiplano. To the southwest of Chachani is Cerro Nicholson and its volcanic field, which were active between 170,000 and 63,000 years ago.

The volcanic complex is formed mainly by aa and block lava flows that rarely reach lengths of about 10 kilometres (6.2 mi); additionally, pyroclastic flows and tephra occur. The volcanic complex covers an area of about 600 square kilometres (230 sq mi) and has a present-day volume of about 154–248 cubic kilometres (37–59 cu mi); this makes Chachani one of the largest volcanoes of the Andes. Glacial erosion and landslides have affected the volcanic complex, forming cirques and U-shaped valleys and removing much of the original shape of the individual volcanoes. Some moraines have been overrun by lava flows.

Chachani drains into the Rio Chili. The Quebrada Canchero, Quebrada Cabrería and Quebrada Traccra drain south to eastward into the river, which flows around the southeastern side of Chachani and has cut a canyon between Chachani and El Misti. The Rio Sumbay, one of its tributaries, runs along the eastern side of Chachani. The Rio Yura flows southward along the western side of Chachani, and upon reaching the then westward-flowing Rio Chili becomes the Rio Vitor, which eventually discharges into the Pacific Ocean together with the Rio Siguas.

=== Glaciation ===
The volcano underwent five stages of glaciation in the past. During the Last Glacial Maximum extensive glaciers formed well-developed moraines at 3,150–3,600 metres (10,330–11,810 ft) elevation; lateral moraines marking the limit of glaciation are located at 3,440 metres (11,290 ft) elevation on the southern flank. Glaciers may have also formed during the Little Ice Age, where there are moraines at 5,100–5,300 metres (16,700–17,400 ft) elevation; presently however the mountain lacks glaciers and only has a snowfield. In general, glaciers in the tropical Andes have been shrinking after the end of the Little Ice Age, and especially after the 1970s.

Permafrost and rock glaciers however still exist at Chachani, especially close to Nocarane, and reach lengths of 1.8 kilometres (1.1 mi); they are characterized by lobate appearances and their locations at the feet of tall cliffs. Some of them (about six in total) are still active and are located above 4,810 metres (15,780 ft) elevation, while the lowest inactive ones end at 4,160 metres (13,650 ft) elevation. Permafrost is expected to be continuous above 5,420 metres (17,780 ft) with discontinuous occurrence above 5,050 metres (16,570 ft). Other periglacial phenomena such as needle ice are also encountered on the volcanic complex.

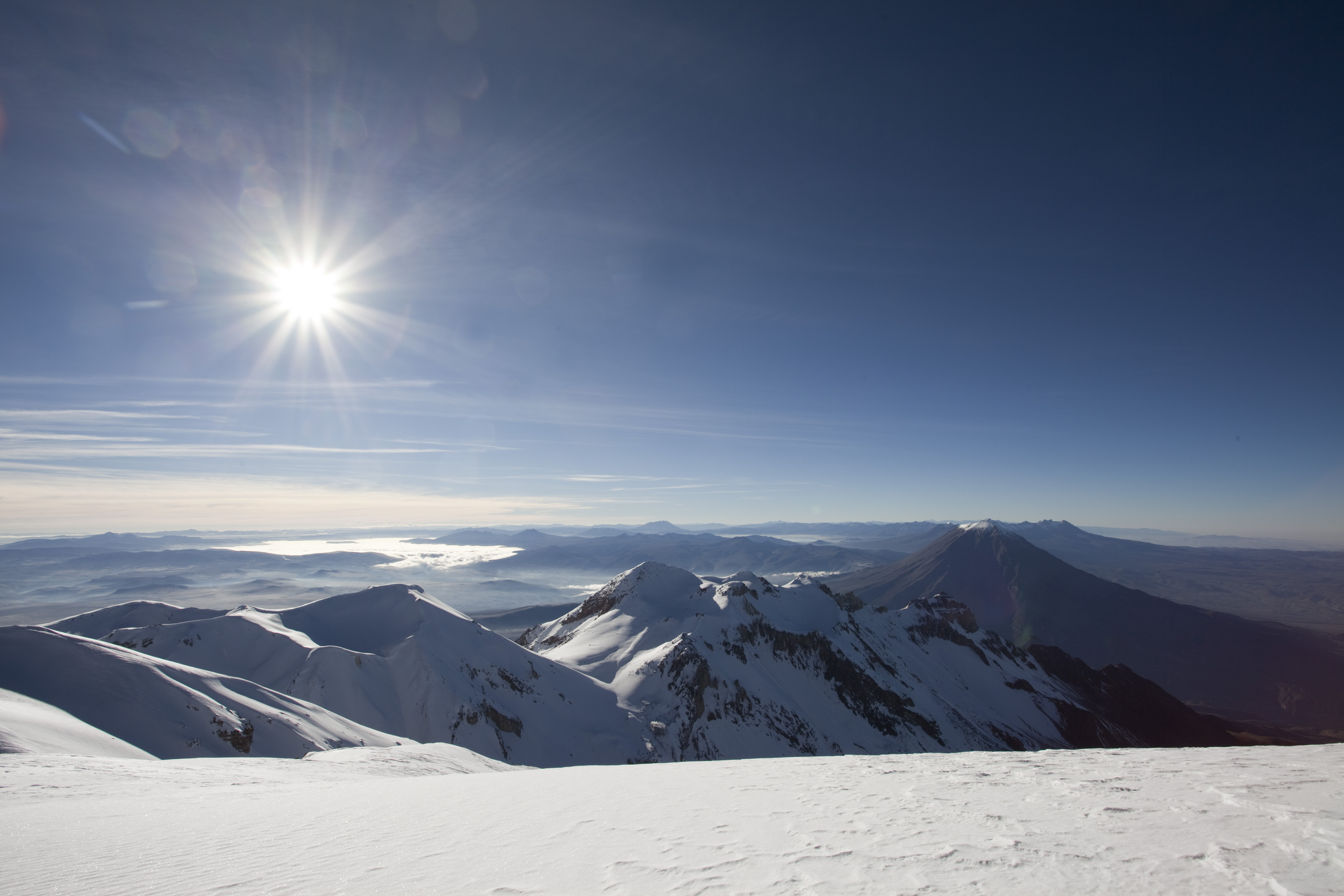
Chachani, looking eastward

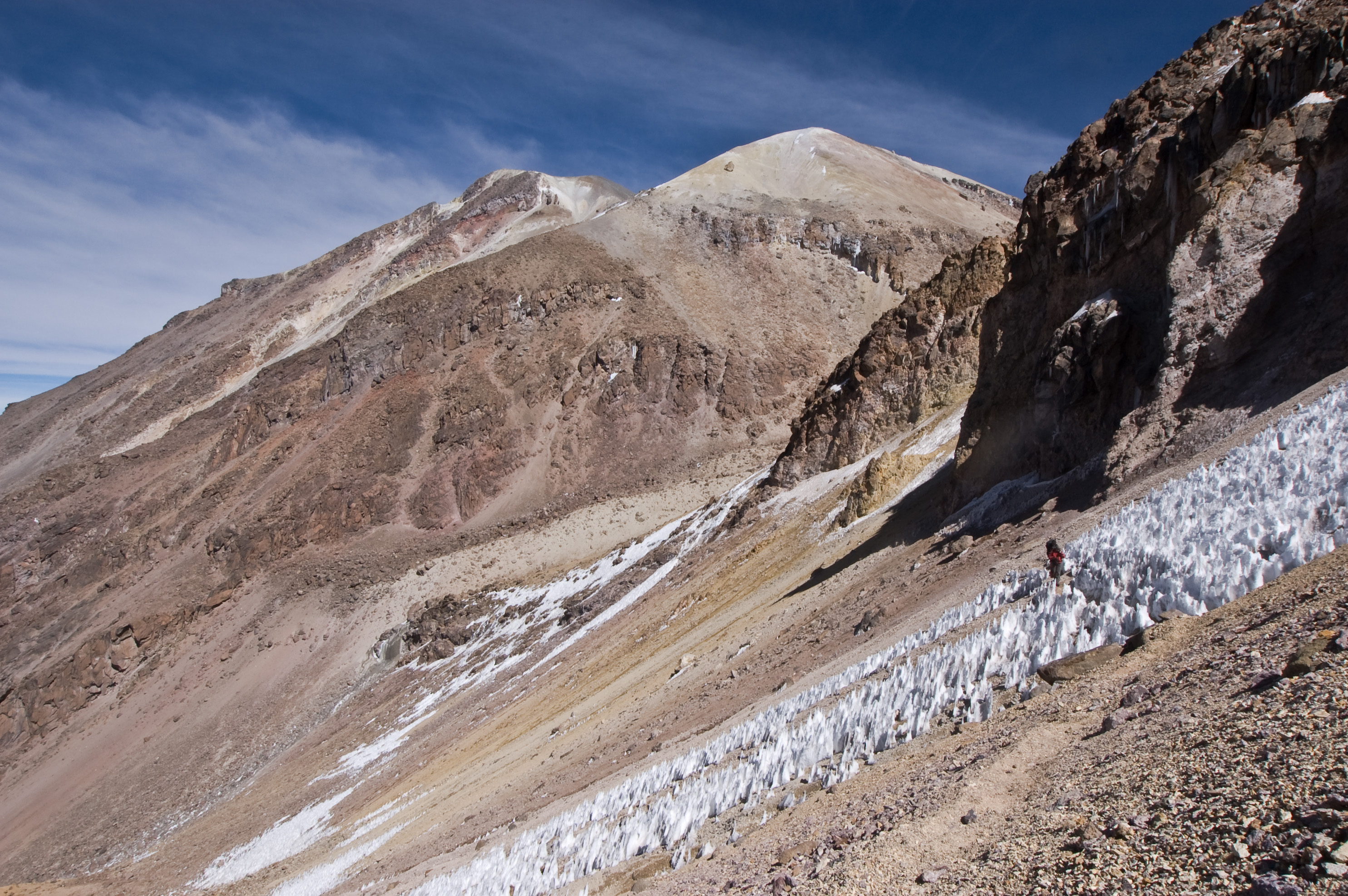
Summit area

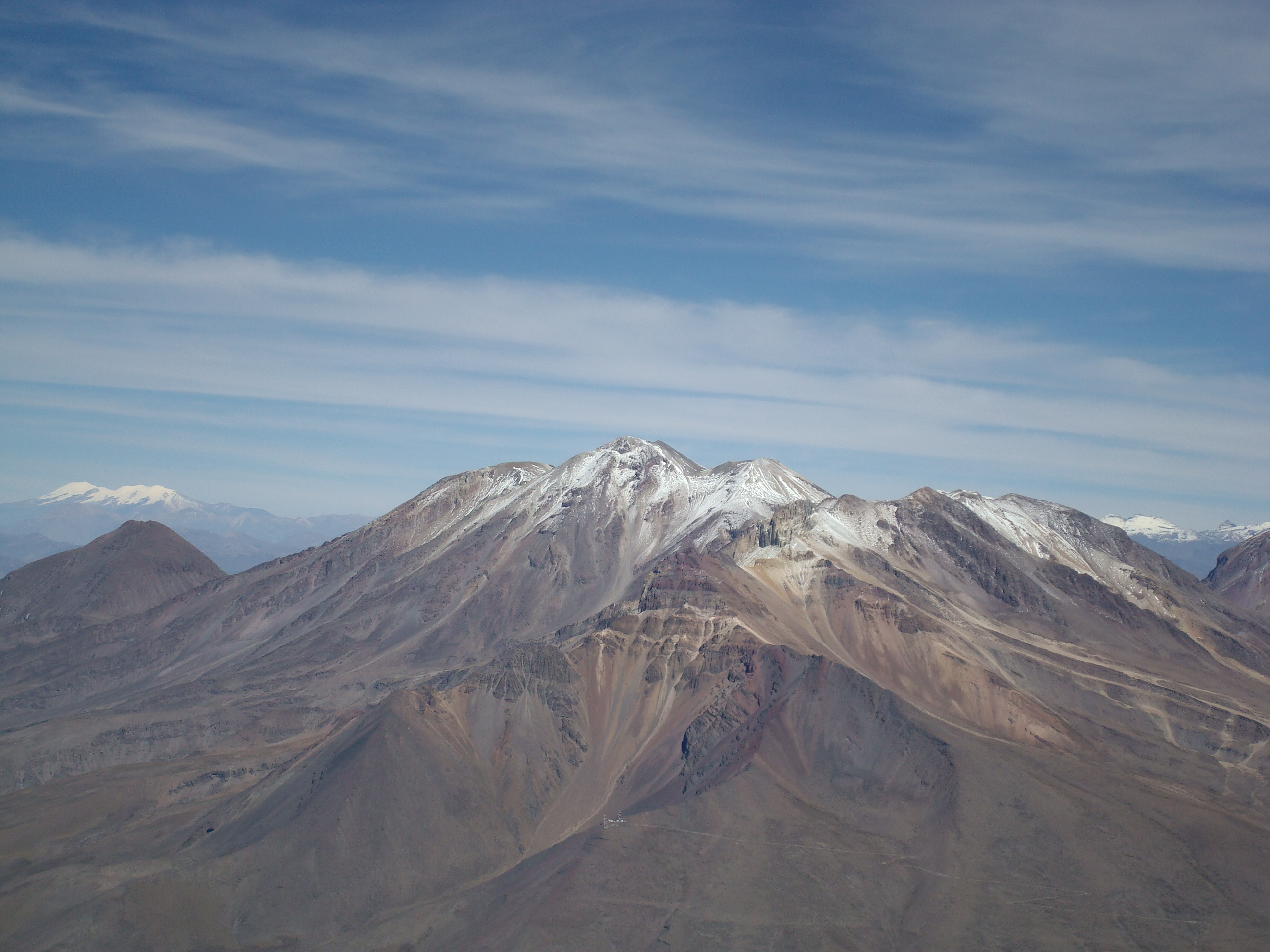
Chachani viewed from El Misti

== Geology ==
Subduction of the Nazca Plate beneath the South America Plate occurs at a rate of 4.6 centimetres per year (1.8 in/year); the subduction process is responsible for the volcanism and earthquake activity of the region. In the Andes, volcanism is distributed between three volcanic belts: the Northern Volcanic Zone, the Central Volcanic Zone, and the Southern Volcanic Zone which coincide with segments where the downgoing Nazca plate falls steeply into the mantle.

Volcanic activity in the Chachani region appears to have begun during the Cretaceous-Paleocene in the form of the "Toquepala" volcanics. The oldest volcanic rocks of the Western Cordillera are known under the name "Tacaza", and underwent erosion and folding before the next phase which is known as "Sillapaca". Finally, during the Miocene-Quaternary, the Sencca Formation and the "Barroso" volcanics developed; Chachani is classified as part of the Barroso volcanics although the oldest volcanism might belong to the Sillapaca unit.

The terrain of the volcano is formed by volcanic rocks of Eocene-to-recent age, which overlie a Precambrian basement and include widespread Neogene-Quaternary ignimbrites. Chachani straddles the margin between the higher-elevation Altiplano and the Arequipa basin at lower altitude.

The younger El Misti volcano lies southeast of Chachani, across the Rio Chili. Other volcanoes in the region are Ampato and Jollojello northwest, Baquetane, Hucullani and Nevado Calcha north, Yanarico east, and Pichu Pichu southeast from Chachani. Of these, Misti, Pichu Pichu, and Chachani are aligned on normal faults that trend northwest–southeast and have been active during the Holocene.

Chachani has erupted andesite and dacite, which define a potassium-rich calc-alkaline suite with unusual adakite characteristics; adakites are magmas that form when the downgoing plate in a subduction setting melts. Phenocrysts include augite, biotite, hornblende, and hypersthene; the rhyolites of the Arequipa ignimbrites additionally contain ilmenite, magnetite, plagioclase, quartz and sanidine. The composition of the volcanic rocks has varied over the lifespan of Chachani; sometimes rocks of basaltic andesite composition were erupted as well while the younger volcanoes are usually more homogeneous; this was paralleled by a decrease in the eruption rate.

== Climate and vegetation ==
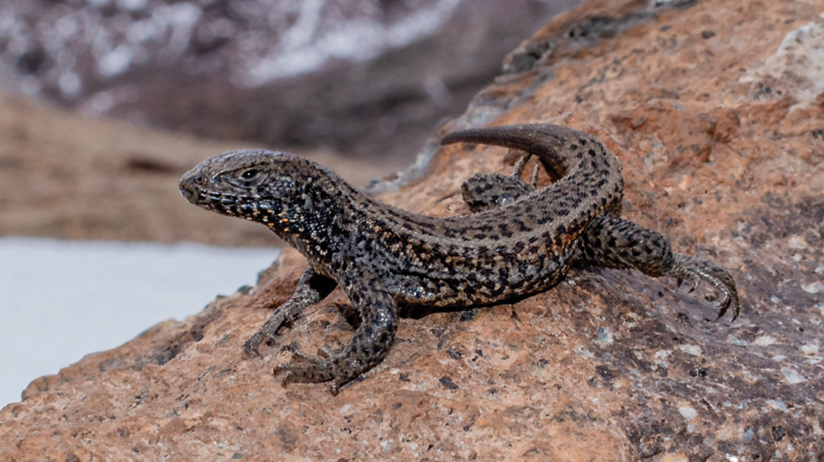
Liolaemus aff. tacnae, photographed at 5,400 metres above sea level on Chachani mountain. This is the highest recorded altitude of any reptile species.

Under the influence of the cold Humboldt Current and the subtropical ridge, the region features an arid climate with less than 100 millimetres (3.9 in) annual precipitation in Arequipa. The mountain is occasionally covered in snow. The zero-degree elevation at Chachani lies at about 5,000 metres (16,000 ft). The diurnal temperature range is large and can reach 20 °C (36 °F), while ground temperatures are much more stable and higher than air temperatures. A meteorological observatory installed by the Harvard College Observatory was active on the mountain in the latest 19th century. The mountain modifies the atmospheric circulation, sometimes redirecting winds polluted by sulfur dioxide from Sabancaya into Arequipa.

From 3,500 to 3,900 metres (11,500 to 12,800 ft) elevation, cacti, herbs, Peruvian feather grass, yareta, lichens, and mosses grow on the slopes of Chachani and other regional volcanoes. Vegetation is scarce to absent above 4,500 metres (14,800 ft) elevation, and much of its lower slopes were stripped of their vegetation during the colonial era. The dry soils are not suitable for agriculture. Part of the volcano is in the Salinas y Aguada Blanca National Reserve. Lizards on the mountain are the highest-altitude known reptile population in the world.

== Eruption history ==
The oldest volcanic formations linked to Chachani are the so-called "sillars", which are rhyolitic pyroclastic flows/ignimbrites containing pumice beds. These ignimbrites include the La Joya Ignimbrite of Pliocene age, the Plio-Quaternary Arequipa Airport Ignimbrite and the Quaternary Yura Tuff and Capillune Formation. The 16–24-cubic-kilometre (3.8–5.8 cu mi), 4.8-million-year-old La Joya, the 18–20-cubic-kilometre (4.3–4.8 cu mi), 1.65-million-year-old Arequipa Airport, and less certainly the 1.5-cubic-kilometre (0.36 cu mi) early Pleistocene Yura Tuff as well as the Capillune Formation ignimbrites appear to have been erupted by Chachani or (in the case of the Yura Tuff) from a vent north of it. Together with lava flows these form the "Pre-Chachani" units and probably are the largest eruptions experienced by Chachani.

They occur in the wider region of Chachani and crop out in the Arequipa area and in river valleys. Their emplacement took place in the form of fast-moving hot streams of rock. An additional ignimbrite is the 13-million-year-old Miocene Rio Chili Ignimbrite; the vents of the Miocene units are unknown and the Rio Chili Ignimbrite appears to be related to the Huaylillas Ignimbrite of southern Peru.

Later, during the Quaternary, the Chachani volcanic complex grew in the caldera. The older activity formed the older volcanoes Chingana northeast, Estribo east, and Nocarane north of Chachani, as well as the Colorado lava domes north-northwest from Nocarane and the volcanoes Chachani Base and El Angel; argon-argon dating has yielded ages of 1,000,000–500,000 years ago for these volcanoes. Later, the volcanoes El Rodado, La Horqueta and Chachani (c. 130,000–131,000 years ago) formed as a west–east alignment, along with the Uyupampa lava field (about 230,000–280,000 years ago) far west from Chachani, the Airport Domes south (between 290,000–400,000 years ago), the Cabrería lava domes south-southeast, and the Volcancillo dome northeast from Chachani.

The youngest reported date of 56,500 ± 31,600 years ago has been obtained on the Cabrería lava domes; formerly the Airport Domes/Los Angeles/Pampa de Palacio were considered to be the youngest and of Holocene age. However, Volcancillo may be even younger, and a post-glacial lava flow descends the western slope of Chachani between Chachani and Nocarane, and phreatic eruptions may have formed Holocene-age craters on Chachani. No historical eruptions are known at the volcanic complex, and the date of the last activity is likewise unclear.

The existence of solfataras in the summit region and of hot springs at Socosani and Yura has been reported, and frequent seismic activity occurs on Chachani's southwestern flank; this activity may relate to either geothermal or tectonic phenomena. Currently, the volcano is considered to be dormant. Occasionally, mudflows descend their slopes and cause damage at lower elevations.

=== Hazards ===
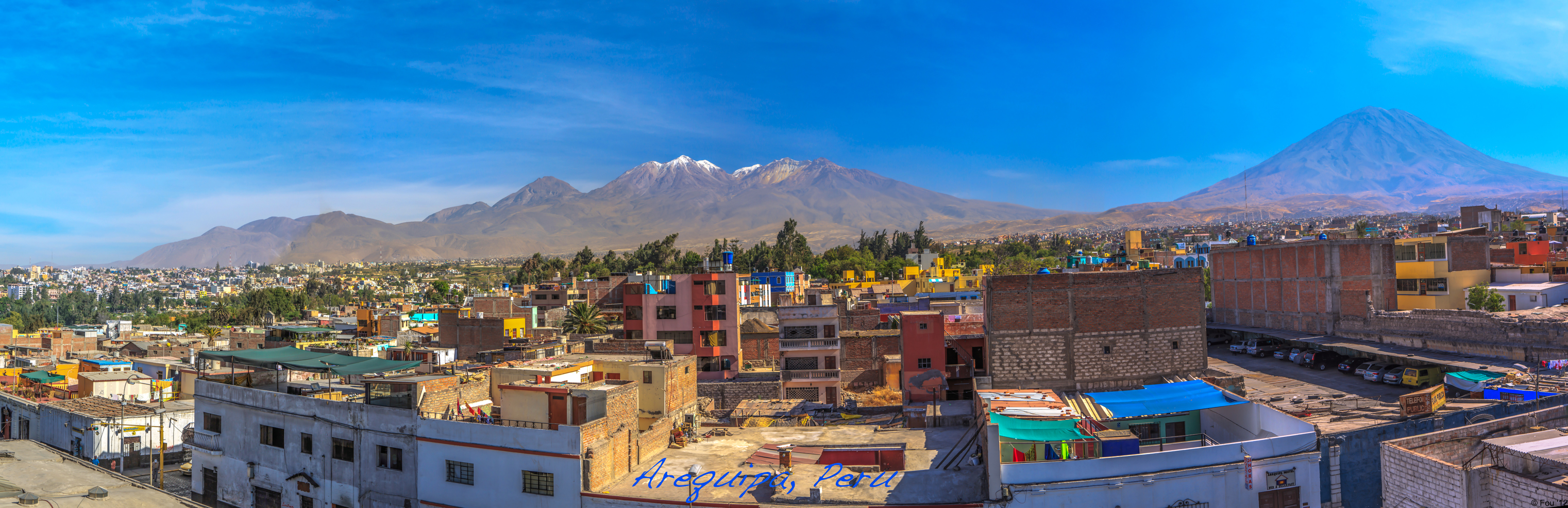

The city of Arequipa, with about one million inhabitants and infrastructure such as the airport, hydropower plants, and reservoirs are within range of Chachani, and human settlement has spread around its base. As of 2023, about 349000 people live on its slopes, and infrastructure such as schools are within the volcano's reach. The western suburbs of Arequipa are 3 kilometres (1.9 mi) below and less than 25 kilometres (16 mi) away from the volcano, and in case of renewed eruptions, they would be threatened by pyroclastic flows. In addition, melting ice and snow on the summit could generate mudflows, and pyroclastic flows, lava flows, and tephra falls are additional hazards. Four hazard scenarios have been established: An effusive eruption would cause serious physical damage, but only a minor threat to humans. Lava-dome-forming eruptions may give rise to pyroclastics, but there is no evidence of such pyroclastic deposits. Pyroclastic flows and Plinian eruptions constitute the other two hazard scenarios.

Chachani is considered to be a high-risk volcano, and the Geophysical Institute of Peru in 2018 installed a monitoring station on Chachani. Several volcano hazard maps exist: One shows three levels of danger depending on the distance from the edifice, the other two show areas threatened by mudflows and pyroclastic fall. Chachani is monitored with seismometers and tiltmeters. Apart from eruptions, volcano-induced pollution of neighbouring water resources is a concern at Chachani.

== Religious importance and archeology ==
Chachani is the protector mountain spirit of Cayma. The people of Arequipa sometimes refer to Chachani as the "father" of El Misti (Pichu Pichu is the "mother") and ascribe to it the ability to influence the gender of newborn children, making them daughters. The Inca worshiped Chachani and its neighbouring mountains and turned its summit into a mountain sanctuary that was later destroyed by sulfur mining and plundering to the point that no trace of archaeological sites can be found, such as e.g., walls. Nevertheless, evidence of Inca human sacrifice known as capacocha was found during archeological expeditions; a finding from 1896 is the earliest known finding of such a sacrifice. A tambo, an Inca waystation, is located on the northern flank of Chachani and features possible granaries and two clusters of buildings surrounding open squares. There are shelters on the way up the mountain.

== Mining ==
Chachani was reportedly mined for sulfur during the colonial era and for the white "sillar" rocks that were used in the construction of the famous buildings of colonial-era Arequipa, which is also known as the "white city".

== Bibliography ==
- "Nevado Chachani". Global Volcanism Program. Smithsonian Institution.
- Chachani on SummitPost
- "Nevado Chachani, Peru" on Peakbagger
- Chachani on Peakware
