= Toro Muerto =

Archaeological site in Peru

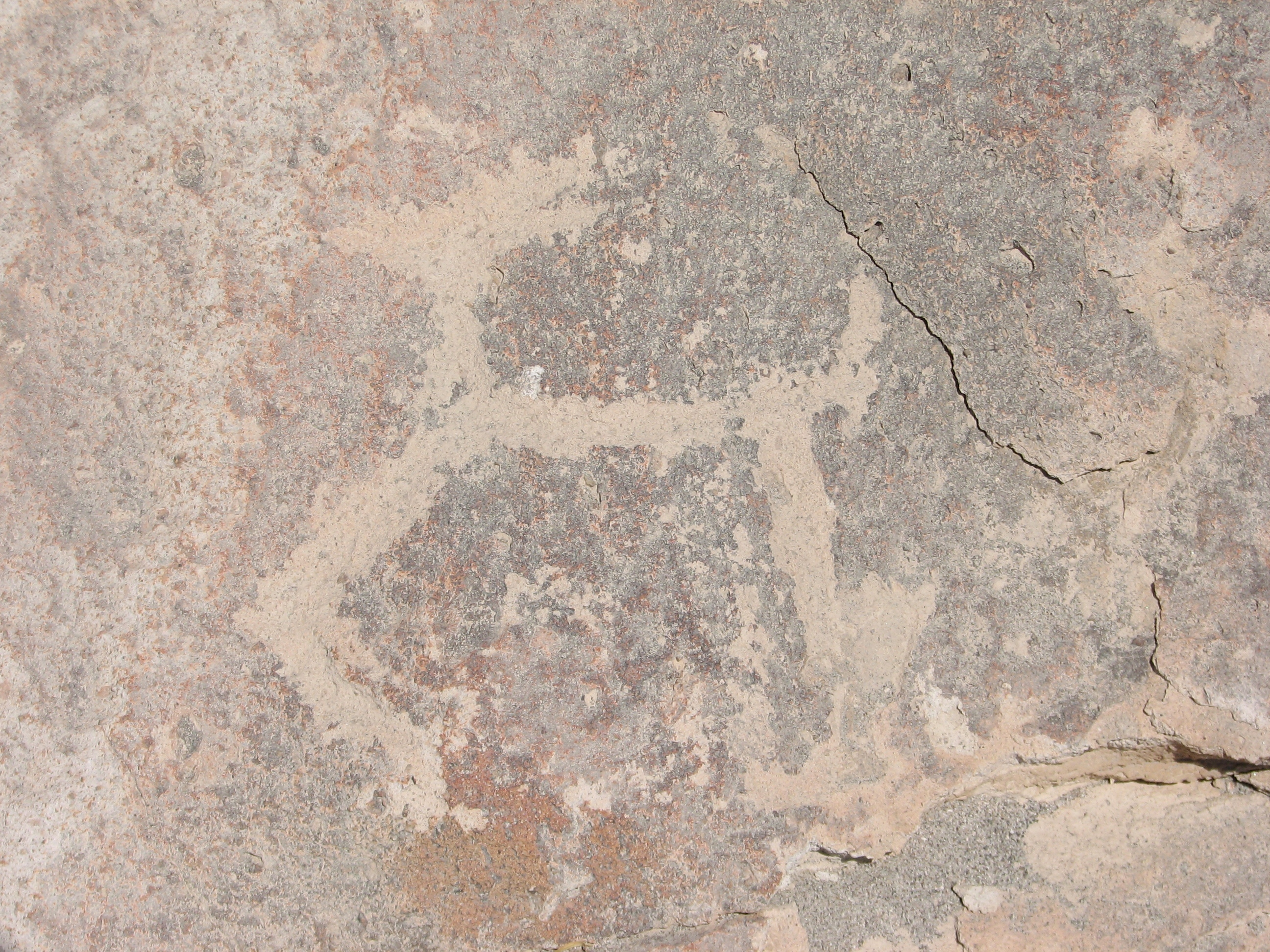
- Petroglyph of a llama

- Location within Peru
- 16°13′20″S 72°30′28″W
- Cultures: Wari culture
- Location: Castilla Province, Arequipa Region, Peru

History
- Built: Approximately 900

Toro Muerto (English: Dead Bull) is a collection of ancient petroglyphs in the Peruvian coastal desert, found in the Castilla province in the region Arequipa in Peru. The site contains some 3000 volcanic rocks with petroglyphs dating back to the Wari culture, active from 500 to 1000 AD. The Wari (Spanish: Huari) were a Middle Horizon civilization that flourished in the south-central Andes and coastal area of modern-day Peru.

== See also ==
- Miculla petroglyphs
