= Miculla petroglyphs =

Archaeological site in Peru

Coordinates: 17.8713°S 70.0966°W

The San Francisco de Miculla petroglyphs, commonly known as the Miculla petroglyphs, are petroglyphs located 22 kilometres (14 mi) from Tacna, Peru. They are carved in low relief in the rocks, and depict people fighting, dancing and hunting animals. They are believed by many to be around 1500 years old, although various people date them from as wide a time period as 500 AD to 1445 AD.
